= William Hardy =

William Hardy may refer to:

- Billy Hardy (boxer) (born 1964), English bantamweight and featherweight boxer
- Billy Hardy (footballer) (1891–1981), English footballer
- W. G. Hardy (1895–1979), Canadian professor, writer, ice hockey administrator
- William Hardy (actor) (1933–2008), American actor and theatre director
- William Hardy (archivist) (1807–1887), British archivist and Deputy Keeper of the Public Record Office
- William Hardy (Australian politician) (fl. 1861), member of the New South Wales Legislative Council
- William Bate Hardy (1864–1934), British biologist
- William H. Hardy (1837–1917), American founder of Hattiesburg
- William Henry Hardy (1831–?), Democratic politician
- Willie Hardy (1922–2007), Democratic politician
- William John Hardy (1857–1919), English archivist and antiquarian
- William Le Hardy (1889–1961), English archivist
- Will Hardy (born 1988), American National Basketball Association Coach

== See also ==
- William Hardie (disambiguation)
