= Bibliography of the home counties =

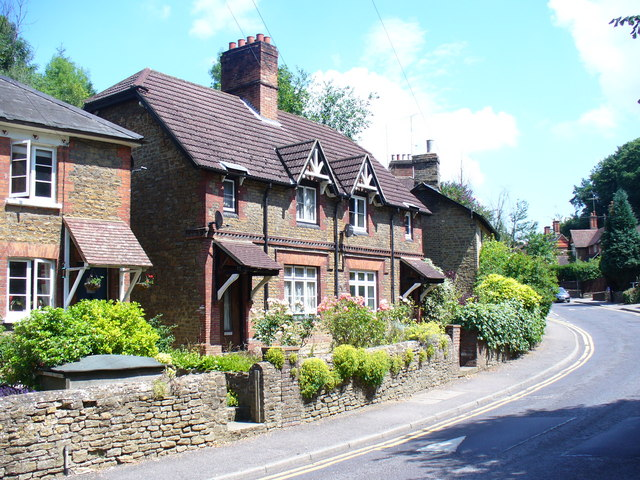
Houses in Godalming, Surrey, said to be the county that exemplifies the qualities of the home counties.

This is a bibliography of the home counties of England that surround London. Generally included are Berkshire, Buckinghamshire, Essex, Hertfordshire, Kent, Surrey, and Sussex but others more distant from London—such as Bedfordshire, Cambridgeshire, Hampshire, and Oxfordshire—are also sometimes regarded as home counties.

It includes general topographical works as well as non-fiction works on particular aspects of the home counties such as natural history, transportation, and military history. Maps stated to be for the home counties are also eligible for inclusion.

== Books and articles ==
=== General ===
- Clunn, Harold Philip. (1936) The Face of the Home Counties: Portrayed in a series of eighteen week-end drives from London. London: Simpkin Marshall.
- Crouch, Marcus. (1975) The Home Counties. London: Robert Hale. (The Regions of Britain series)
- Fitter, R. S. R. (1951) Home Counties. London: William Collins. (About Britain series, No. 3)
- Mais, S. P. B. (1942) The Home Counties. London: Batsford. (The Face of Britain series) (2nd edition 1947)
- — (1951) The Home Counties in Pictures, etc. London: Odhams Press.
- Mortimer, J. D. (Ed.) (1947) An Anthology of the Home Counties. London: Methuen.
- Walford, Edward. (1880) Holidays in Home Counties. London: David Bogue.

=== Agriculture and natural history ===
- Fussell, G. E. "Home Counties Farming, 1840-80", The Economic Journal, Vol. 57, No. 227 (Sep., 1947), pp. 321–345.
- Hirst, W. A. (1927) Rambles in the Home Counties. London: Richard Cobden-Sanderson.
- Pinniger, E. B. (1946) The Neuroptera of the Home Counties. London. London Naturalist reprint No. 38.

=== Other ===
- Barrett-Cross, R. L. (1988) The History of the Home Counties Medical Services of the Territorial Army. Vol.1, 1859-1922. Croydon: R. L. Barrett-Cross. ISBN 0951351400
- Przedlacka, Joanna. (2002) Estuary English? A sociophonetic study of teenage speech in the Home Counties. Frankfurt am Main & Oxford: Peter Lang. ISBN 3631393407

=== Transport ===
- Waterways of the Home Counties. London: Inland Waterways, 1966.
- Channer, Nick. (2019) The Home Counties from London by Train. Revised edition. Ordnance Survey. ISBN 9780319091142
- Cotton, Nick. (2010) Cycling Traffic-Free: Home Counties. Ian Allan. ISBN 9780711034358

== Magazines and journals ==
- The Home Counties Magazine, 1899–1912. (Incorporating Middlesex and Hertfordshire Notes and Queries 1895–1898)

== Maps and gazetteers ==
- An imperfect Atlas of the Home Counties, without title; containing Maps of Middlesex, Surrey, Kent, Hertfordshire, Essex, the River Thames & the Country round London; with new Plan of London XXIX. miles in circumference. [London], [1797].
- Stokes, H. G. "A Gazetteer of the Home Counties" in R. S. R. Fitter (1951) Home Counties. London: William Collins. pp. 80–92. (About Britain series, No. 3)
