= The Regions of Britain (book series) =

1970s book series

The Lake District by Roy Millward, first edition, 1970.

The Regions of Britain is a book series of topographical guides to the British regions published by Robert Hale and Company, by Eyre & Spottiswoode and by Eyre Methuen in the 1970s. The series included a blend of historical and contemporary material and it was the practice of the publishers to use authors native to the regions they wrote about such as S. H. Burton of Devon who wrote about the West Country, Marcus Crouch on the Home Counties was from Middlesex, and Arthur Raistrick who wrote about the Pennines was from Yorkshire. John Talbot White, a noted naturalist of Goldsmiths College, wrote two volumes for the series including on Kent, Surrey and Sussex, an area of Britain about which he wrote three other books after having become fascinated by it after he was evacuated from London to the Kent/Sussex border as a boy during the Second World War.

This is an incomplete list of volumes:

Title	Date	Author
The Lake District	1970 (revised ed. 1974)	Roy Millward and Adrian Robinson
The Upper Thames	1970	J. R. L. Anderson
The West Country	1972	S. H. Burton
Islands of Western Scotland: Inner and Outer Hebrides	1973	W. H. Murray
The North Country	1973	G. Bernard Wood
The Scottish Border and Northumberland: Berwickshire, Roxburghshire, Northumberland	1973	John Talbot White
The Highlands and Islands	1974	Francis Thompson
The Home Counties	1975	Marcus Crouch
The Peak District	1975	Roy Millward and Adrian Robinson
The Cotswolds	1977	Josceline Finberg
The South East Down and Weald: Kent, Surrey and Sussex	1977	John Talbot White
The Pennine Dales	1978	Arthur Raistrick
The Welsh Borders	1978	Roy Millward and Adrian Robinson
East Anglia	1979	Peter Steggall

== See also ==
- County Books series
- Portrait Books series
- The Regional Books
