= Administrative geography of the United Kingdom =

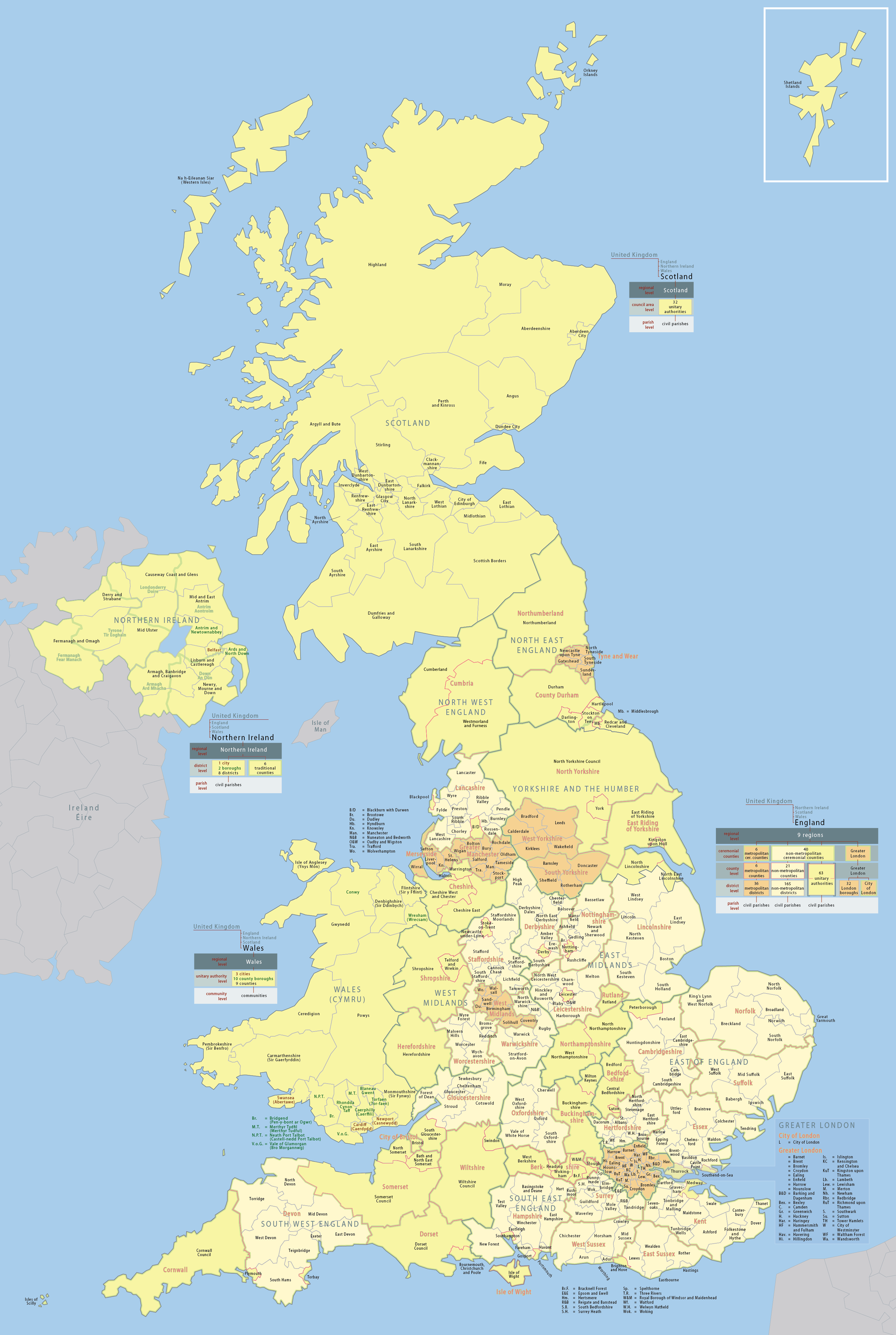
Administrative units of the United Kingdom

The administrative geography of the United Kingdom is intricate, layered, and inconsistent across its constituent nations. The country also has complex and inconsistent municipal structure. As a sovereign state located northwest of continental Europe, the United Kingdom comprises England, Northern Ireland, Scotland, and Wales. Each of these nations operates its own distinct system of local government and territorial divisions. As a result, there is no single, unified layer of administrative units that spans the entire United Kingdom.

As there is no written document that comprehensively encompasses the British constitution, and owing to a convoluted history of the formation of the United Kingdom, a variety of terms are used to refer to its constituent parts, which are sometimes called the four countries of the United Kingdom. The four are sometimes collectively referred to as the Home Nations, particularly in sporting contexts. Although the four countries are important for legal and governmental purposes, they are not comparable to administrative subdivisions of most other countries.

The United Kingdom also contains 17 dependent territories which are not officially a part of the UK but are represented by it in places like the UN.

Historically, the subnational divisions of the UK have been the county and the ecclesiastical parish, while following the emergence of a unified parliament of the United Kingdom, the ward and constituency have been pan-UK political subdivisions. More contemporary divisions include Lieutenancy areas and the statistical territories defined with the modern International Territorial Level (formerly NUTS) and ISO 3166-2:GB systems.

== History ==
Euler diagram of the British Isles

This structure was formed by the union agreed between the former sovereign states, the Kingdom of England (including the Principality of Wales) and the Kingdom of Scotland in the Treaty of Union and enacted by the Acts of Union 1707 to form the single Kingdom of Great Britain (1707–1800); followed by the Act of Union 1800, which combined Great Britain with the Kingdom of Ireland to form the United Kingdom of Great Britain and Ireland. The independence of the Irish Free State in 1922, following the partition of Ireland, resulted in the present-day United Kingdom of Great Britain and Northern Ireland.

Wales was incorporated into the English legal system through the Laws in Wales Acts 1535-1542, the earlier Statute of Rhuddlan having restricted but not abolished Welsh Law following the Edwardian conquest in 1282. As a result, England and Wales are treated as a single entity for some purposes, principally that they share a legal system (see English law), while Scotland and Northern Ireland each have a separate legal system (see Scots Law and Northern Ireland law).

Northern Ireland was the first part of the British Isles to have a devolved government, under the Government of Ireland Act 1920, and that continued until the Parliament of Northern Ireland was suspended in 1972. After a period of direct rule by the Westminster government and some abortive attempts at reinstating devolved government during the Troubles, the present-day Northern Ireland Assembly was established in 1998, and is currently in operation following a number of periods of suspension. The complex history of Northern Ireland has led to differing views as to its status. The term "Province" is often used by unionist and British commentators to refer to Northern Ireland, but not by nationalists.

== Overview ==
Following Brexit, the UK ONS replaced the EU NUTS1 regional model with its own International Territorial Level model, continuing the treatment of the 3 Home Nations alongside the 9 Regions of England.

Overview of administrative divisions of the UK
| Sovereign State | United Kingdom^{[L]} | | | | | | | | |
| Constituent country | England (without devolution) | | | | | | Wales^{[L]} | Scotland^{[L]} | Northern Ireland^{[L]} |
| Authority area | Greater London Authority and combined authority areas,^{[C]} other areas | | | | | | Wales^{[L]} | Scotland^{[L]} | Northern Ireland^{[L]} |
| Authority area | Greater London Authority and combined authority areas,^{[C]} other areas | | | | | | (with devolution) | | |
| Lieutenancy area | Ceremonial counties | | | | | | Preserved counties | Lieutenancy areas | Lieutenancy areas |
| County type | Non-metropolitan | | Metropolitan | Unique | | | Preserved counties | Lieutenancy areas | Lieutenancy areas |
| County council area | Two-tier council area^{[C]} | Unitary authority areas^{[C][U]} | None | None | City of London^{[C]} | Isles of Scilly^{[C][S]} | Principal areas^{[C]} | Council areas^{[C]} | Districts^{[C]} |
| District | Non-metropolitan districts^{[B][C]} | Unitary authority areas^{[C][U]} | Metropolitan boroughs^{[B][C]} | London boroughs^{[C][D]} | City of London^{[C]} | Isles of Scilly^{[C][S]} | Principal areas^{[C]} | Council areas^{[C]} | Districts^{[C]} |
| Parish | Civil parishes^{[C][T]} | | | | None | Civil parishes | Communities^{[M]} | Communities^{[V]} | (Civil parishes)^{[W]} |

Notes

The markers above link to relevant articles where available.

^{[B]} Can have city, borough or royal borough status
^{[C]} Has a council
^{[D]} Can have city or royal borough status
^{[L]} Has a legislature
^{[M]} May have a council
^{[S]} Sui generis unitary authority. Not a county nor part of Cornwall (except for ceremonial purposes). Powers similar to a mainland county.
^{[T]} Can have city, town, village or neighbourhood status. Not all areas of England have parishes, especially metropolitan areas.
^{[U]} County council areas comprising one district. The council is at either county or district level.
^{[V]} Limited administrative functions
^{[W]} No administrative functions

== By constituent country ==
=== England ===
England has no devolved national legislature or government. Matters devolved to the devolved administrations in Wales, Scotland and Northern Ireland are held by Parliament and executed by the UK Government.

England itself has an intricate, layered, and inconsistent system of administrative divisions, which largely originate from the major restructuring of local government in 1972. Outside the London region and the Isles of Scilly, the entirety of England is divided into counties and districts of local government purposes. Local government counties are either classified as metropolitan or non-metropolitan. While every area is legally part of a county, all metropolitan counties and some non-metropolitan counties do not have any administrative body; in these cases, the functions that would otherwise be undertaken by a county council are instead undertaken by a single, or untiary, authority.

London conversely is divided into 32 boroughs, which make up Greater London, and the City of London, which has unique (Sui generis) governance arrangements compared to the rest of England. London also has the Greater London Authority, and a directly elected Mayor of London. The Isles of Scilly also have unique governance arrangements. County, district and unitary authorities are sometimes grouped with London borough councils and the Isle of Scilly council as principal authorities.

In many areas, there are civil parishes with parish or town councils. Parished areas cover most of England but they are not universal and are not as common in larger urban areas. Areas not within a civil parish are called unparished areas.

Some areas sit within a combined authority area. A combined authority is not a local authority in its own right, but an established legal body that covers multiple principal local authority areas. In some cases, these align with a local government county (e.g. Greater Manchester) or otherwise combine multiple districts and counties together. Other cooperative structures that span local government areas, like joint local planning or waste collection, informally create additional local government geographies.

Some local services, such as policing, fire and rescue and health, are delivered along different geographical lines than the area a principal local authority covers. In this case, the service will be delivered by a different authority from the principal local authority.

=== Northern Ireland ===
Northern Ireland has the Northern Ireland Assembly and Northern Ireland Executive established under the Good Friday Agreement. During periods where the devolved institutions were suspended, executive government in Northern Ireland was administered directly by the Secretary of State for Northern Ireland and laws made in the United Kingdom Parliament – known as "direct rule" in contrast to devolution.

For local government, Northern Ireland is divided into 11 districts, which are unitary authorities.

Northern Ireland is divided into six traditional counties. Though widely used, these no longer serve any administrative purpose.

=== Scotland ===
Scotland has a devolved legislature, the Scottish Parliament, with a government, the Scottish Government, since 1999. The Scottish Government is headed by the First Minister of Scotland who is responsible for all areas of decision making, government policy as well as the international engagement of Scotland. The Scottish Parliament is made up of 129 elected Members of the Scottish Parliament (MSPs), with the population of Scotland being represented by a number of 8 MSPs. The Scottish Parliament consists of two types of MSPs – a constituency MSP who represents the local area, and seven regional list MSPs who collectively represent the larger area that includes any given constituency.

The Scottish Parliament meets at Holyrood, located in the capital city of Edinburgh. Edinburgh is also the seat of Bute House, the official residence of the First Minister, as well as the Palace of Holyroodhouse, the official residence of the monarch in Scotland. The highest courts in Scotland operating under the countries legal system – the High Court of Justiciary and the Court of Session (known collectively as the Supreme Courts of Scotland) – are based at Parliament House, Edinburgh.

For local government, Scotland has 32 council areas (unitary authorities). Below this uniform level of subdivision, there are varying levels of area committees in the larger rural council areas, and many small community councils throughout the country, although these are not universal. Scottish community councils have few if any powers beyond being a forum for raising issues of concern.

=== Wales ===
Wales has an elected, devolved legislature, the Senedd (Welsh Parliament; Welsh: Senedd Cymru), from which the Welsh Government is drawn. For local government, Wales consists of 22 unitary principal areas, split equally into 11 county boroughs and 11 counties, although 4 principal areas also hold city status. Below these are community councils, which have powers similar to those of English parish councils.

The 22 principal areas are grouped into preserved counties, which are used for ceremonial purposes. Although based on the counties used for local government between 1974 and 1996, they no longer have an administrative function.

== Democratic representation ==
=== Parliaments ===
Each of the 650 electoral areas or divisions called constituencies of the Parliament of the United Kingdom has, since 1950, elected one Member of Parliament (MP) to represent it at the House of Commons of the United Kingdom. Before 1950, some constituencies elected two or more MPs using the plurality bloc vote system, and before the Reform Act 1832 nearly all constituencies in England returned two MPs.

The devolved Scottish Parliament uses an additional member system of elections, which combines single-member constituencies with multi-member electoral regions.

The Senedd, the Welsh Parliament, uses a closed-list party-list proportional representation system, with 16 multi-member constituencies.

Elections to the Northern Ireland Assembly are held under the single transferable vote (STV) system, in 18 multi-member constituencies.

=== Local government ===
The wards and electoral divisions of the United Kingdom are electoral districts at subnational level represented by one or more councillors at local authority level, or else used to divide the electorate into electoral districts for voting. It is the primary unit of British electoral geography.

== Informal divisions ==
There are also many informal, historical and special purpose regional designations. Some such as the Highlands of Scotland have or have had, to some extent, formal boundaries. Others such as the London commuter belt are more diffuse. Some such as Snowdonia (Welsh: Eryri) have a formal boundary in some contexts; in this case as a National Park. Others such as The Fens of eastern England are quite distinctly defined by geography but do not form any official entity.

== International subdivisions ==
The UK's Office for National Statistics, the International Organization for Standardization and before 2021 Eurostat, have developed subdivision codes for the UK. See ITL (UK) and ISO 3166-2:GB.

== Dependent territories ==
Administrative units of the United Kingdom and its dependent territories (Pitcairn Islands not labelled)

The United Kingdom has 17 dependent territories in total: three "Crown Dependencies" in the British Isles and in the English Channel and fourteen "overseas territories" scattered around the world.

Unlike other former colonial powers, the British Government does not classify its overseas possessions (or the crown dependencies, which share historical ties with the British Crown) as subdivisions of the United Kingdom itself; rather, each is treated in law as a separate jurisdiction. Most have their own legislatures and a degree of autonomy usually exceeding that of the devolved UK nations, including fiscal independence.

Out of the 14 overseas territories, 10 are autonomous, two used primarily as military bases, one uninhabited, and one an Antarctic claim.

However, the UK retains varying degrees of responsibility in all of the territories, currently ranging from full political control to a largely ceremonial presence. The main reserved matters are the areas of diplomacy, international treaties, defence and security. The UK also retains in all territories a residual responsibility for 'good governance', a loosely defined constitutional concept recently exemplified by its imposition of direct rule following alleged serious corruption in the Turks and Caicos Islands. The UK parliament at Westminster, and the British Government through the Privy Council, both retain the power to legislate for the overseas territories – though by convention will usually only do so with each local government's consent.

The three Crown Dependencies within the British Isles are self-governing possessions of the British Crown. They are distinct from the British overseas territories of the United Kingdom.

== See also ==
- Countries of the United Kingdom
- Types of subdivision of the United Kingdom
- Devolution in the United Kingdom
- European Parliament constituencies in the United Kingdom
- British Isles (terminology)
- British Overseas Territories
- Crown Dependencies
- List of subnational entities
- Office for National Statistics coding system for counties, districts, wards and census areas
- List of regions of the United Kingdom by Human Development Index
