= J. R. L. Anderson =

British journalist

- Born: John Richard Lane Anderson; 17 June 1911; Georgetown, Guyana
- Died: 21 August 1981 (aged 70); Wantage, England
- Occupations: Journalist, author
- Writing career
- Notable works: Vinland Voyage (1967); The Ulysses Factor (1970); High Mountains and Cold Seas (1980); Peter Blair and Piet Deventer mysteries

John Richard Lane Anderson (17 June 1911 – 21 August 1981) was a British journalist, sailor, and prolific author. After a number of short-term jobs, including a period in the Indian Army, Anderson joined The Guardian where he remained for the rest of his career.

He began to write books seriously in the 1960s, with a special interest in stories of real life adventure on the sea. He reported on Francis Chichester's voyages and edited Chichester's Atlantic Adventure in 1962. In 1966, he was the leader of a Guardian-sponsored crew that sailed a cutter from England to North America in order to replicate Leif Erikson's voyage, and in 1967 he published an account of the journey.

He also produced topographical, children's, and other works but is best known for his Peter Blair and Piet Deventer mysteries, the last of which, Late Delivery, was published posthumously in 1982.

== Early life ==
John Anderson was born in Georgetown, British Guiana (modern Guyana), on 17 June 1911 the son of a Colonial Office official who was a descendant of one of the founders of the colony. He was educated in England but left school at 17 after which he worked at Harold Monro's Poetry Bookshop, a position he obtained after Monro read some of Anderson's poetry. He then had various jobs and matriculated at the University of London but left after a year.

== Career ==
Anderson's first journalistic job was on the Hornsey Journal after which he joined the News Chronicle. He then tried to establish a soap manufactory in Trinidad, but after that failed he returned to Britain to work at Manchester's journal of the textile industry, the Textile Recorder.

He was appointed to an emergency commission in the Indian Army as a second lieutenant 21 January 1942 with the 18th Royal Garhwal Rifles and promoted acting lieutenant 1 February 1942. He taught gunners trigonometry by writing a manual in Urdu, that he learned in three months, in which he compared the relationship between the sides of a right-angled triangle to that between cousins of various degrees within a family. He was invalided out of the Indian Army in 1944, from whom he refused to accept a disability pension due to the country's poverty, and was then taken on by The Guardian where he became the paper's correspondent at Eisenhower's headquarters in the later period of the Second World War.

After the end of the war he became The Guardian's labour correspondent and then an assistant editor in its Manchester office and a leader writer. A keen sailor himself, he reported on Francis Chichester's voyages and edited Chichester's Atlantic Adventure in 1962. In 1966, as yachting editor, he was the leader of a Guardian sponsored crew that sailed a cutter from England to Martha's Vineyard via Iceland and Greenland in order to replicate Leif Erikson's voyage. In 1967 he published a book, Vinland Voyage, about the trip.

== Writing ==
He published a volume of poems, The Lost Traveller, in 1931, which was his last sole-authored work until Vinland Voyage in 1967. After that he was prolific, producing fiction, history, biography, topographical, and children's books. His non-fiction included East of Suez (1969), a history of BP; The Ulysses Factor, a study of the exploring instinct; The Upper Thames (1970) in The Regions of Britain series; and The Oldest Road about The Ridgeway (1975).

Biographies were The Road from Wigan Pier about the union leader Les Cannon (1973), a memoir of the writer C. K. Ogden (1977), and High Mountains and Cold Seas about the mountaineer and sailor Bill Tilman (1980).

His fiction included works that crossed between crime, mystery, and the thriller, with Peter Blair and Piet Deventer as his principal protagonists, many of which were published by Victor Gollancz in their distinctive yellow-jackets.

== Death and legacy ==
Anderson died in Wantage, Oxfordshire, on 21 August 1981. His funeral was at St Peter's Church, Charney Bassett, Oxfordshire. His last novel, Late Delivery, was published posthumously in 1982 and dedicated to the physician Ian Lister Cheese. An author's note at the start requested the co-operation of the reader in imagining the accents of the characters as the author had chosen to write in standard rather than phonetic or distorted English due to the difficulties of portraying accents in writing.

Also published posthumously was Leeches and Breeches, the memoir of a country town general practitioner physician Frederick Vaughan Squires (1895-1973) and his experiences in practice and in the First and Second World Wars. It was published in 2015 after compilation by his son Nick Squires of Wantage, with the help of his patient Anderson, who was credited as the editor.

== Selected publications ==
Anderson's publications include:

=== Non-fiction ===
- Vinland Voyage. Eyre & Spottiswoode, London, 1967.
- East of Suez: A study of Britain's greatest trading enterprise. Hodder & Stoughton, London, 1969. ISBN 0340109750
- The Ulysses Factor. The exploring instinct in man. Hodder & Stoughton, London, 1970. ISBN 0340107553
- The Upper Thames. Eyre & Spottiswoode, London, 1970. The Regions of Britain series. ISBN 0413274004
- The Road from Wigan Pier: A Biography of Les Cannon. Victor Gollancz, London, 1973. (With Olga Cannon) ISBN 0575014997
- The Oldest Road. An exploration of the Ridgeway. Wildwood House, London, 1975. ISBN 0704501678 (With Fay Godwin)
- High Mountains and Cold Seas: A biography of H. W. Tilman. Victor Gollancz, London, 1980. ISBN 0575028068
- Learning to Die: A personal testimony. Mowbray, London, 1983. ISBN 0264669282

=== Edited non-fiction ===
- History on the Road. A vintage car miscellany from "Manchester Guardian". Hamish Hamilton, London, 1958.
- Chichester, Francis. Atlantic Adventure. Allen & Unwin, London, 1962. ISBN 0049100041
- C. K. Ogden: A collective memoir. Elek: Pemberton, 1977. ISBN 9780301760612 (With P. Sargant Florence)
- Squires, F. V. Leeches and Breeches. Red Cap, Faringdon, 2015. ISBN 9780993164224

=== Peter Blair mysteries ===
First UK edition (1978) of Death in the Greenhouse

All Gollancz, London.

- Death on the Rocks (1973)
- Death in the Thames (1974)
- Death in the North Sea (1975)
- Death in the Desert (1976)
- Death in the Caribbean (1977)
- Death in the City (1977)
- Death in the Greenhouse (1978)
- Death in a High Latitude (1981)

=== Piet Deventer Investigations ===
All Gollancz, London.

- A Sprig of Sea Lavender (1978)
- Festival (1979)
- Late Delivery (1982)

=== Children's ===
- Voyage of the 'Griffin' - as told in "Jackanory" by John Anderson. BBC, London, 1968. ISBN 0563083182
- The Discovery of America. Puffin, Harmondsworth, 1973. Illustrated by Graham Humphreys. ISBN 0140610073
- The Vikings. Puffin, Harmondsworth, 1974. Illustrated by Graham Humphreys. ISBN 0140610146
- Discovering History. Victor Gollancz, London, 1975. Illustrated by Graham Humphreys. ISBN 0575019522

=== Other fiction ===
- The Lost Traveller. E. Mathews & Clark, London, 1931. (poetry)
- Reckoning in Ice. Gollancz, London, 1971. ISBN 0575013214
- The Nine-Spoked Wheel. Gollancz, London, 1975. ISBN 057501945X
- Redundancy Pay. Gollancz, London, 1976. ISBN 0575020830
