= S. H. Burton =

British writer (1919–2005)

- Born: Samuel Holroyd Burton; 30 November 1919; Caverswall, Staffordshire
- Died: 6 December 2005 (aged 86); Stafford
- Education: Longton High School
- Alma mater: Queen's College, University of Cambridge
- Occupations: School teacher, author
- Writing career
- Notable works: Exmoor (1952); Shakespeare's Life and Stage (1989)

Samuel Holroyd "Tim" Burton (30 November 1919 – 6 December 2005) was a British school teacher, college lecturer and prolific author of English language textbooks and books about the west of England. He also produced fiction, assembled anthologies and wrote a biography of William Shakespeare.

He was a lifelong socialist, supporter of the Labour Party, and an anti-nuclear campaigner who set up a branch of the Campaign for Nuclear Disarmament. He was chairman of the Exmoor Society and campaigned for the preservation of its open spaces.

== Early life and family ==
Samuel Burton, known as Tim, was born on 30 November 1919 at Caverswall, Staffordshire, England. His father had various occupations and his mother was a village schoolteacher. He received a scholarship that enabled him to attend Longton High School and then Queen's College, University of Cambridge. He joined the British Army in 1939 but was discharged in 1941 due to injury. He met his future wife Phyl while he was in a military hospital.

== Career ==
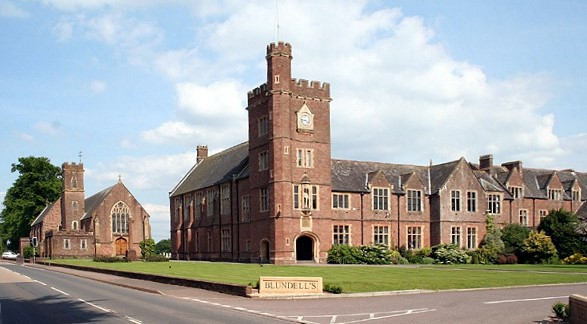
Blundell's School, Tiverton

Burton first taught at King Edward VI school in Stafford before becoming head of English at Blundell's School in Devon from 1945 to 1964. He subsequently worked at St Luke's College of Education in Exeter and as a lecturer for the British Council and the Workers' Educational Association.

When not teaching he produced a large number of English language textbooks, as well as anthologies, biography, fiction, edited editions of classic works and books on Devon and Cornwall. He compiled anthologies of science fiction that he used for teaching purposes and thought effective because so many pupils already read the genre. His first published book was The Criticism of Poetry (1950) which remained in print for nearly four decades.

By working evenings, weekends and holidays, and only in longhand because he could not stand typewriters, Burton managed to produce nearly 50 books of various kinds, saying in 1984 that, "at present I have 14 royalty-earning books in print [that] bring me in a gross income of about £3,000 a year ... to live, I have to write three books a year, and that's a cracking pace."

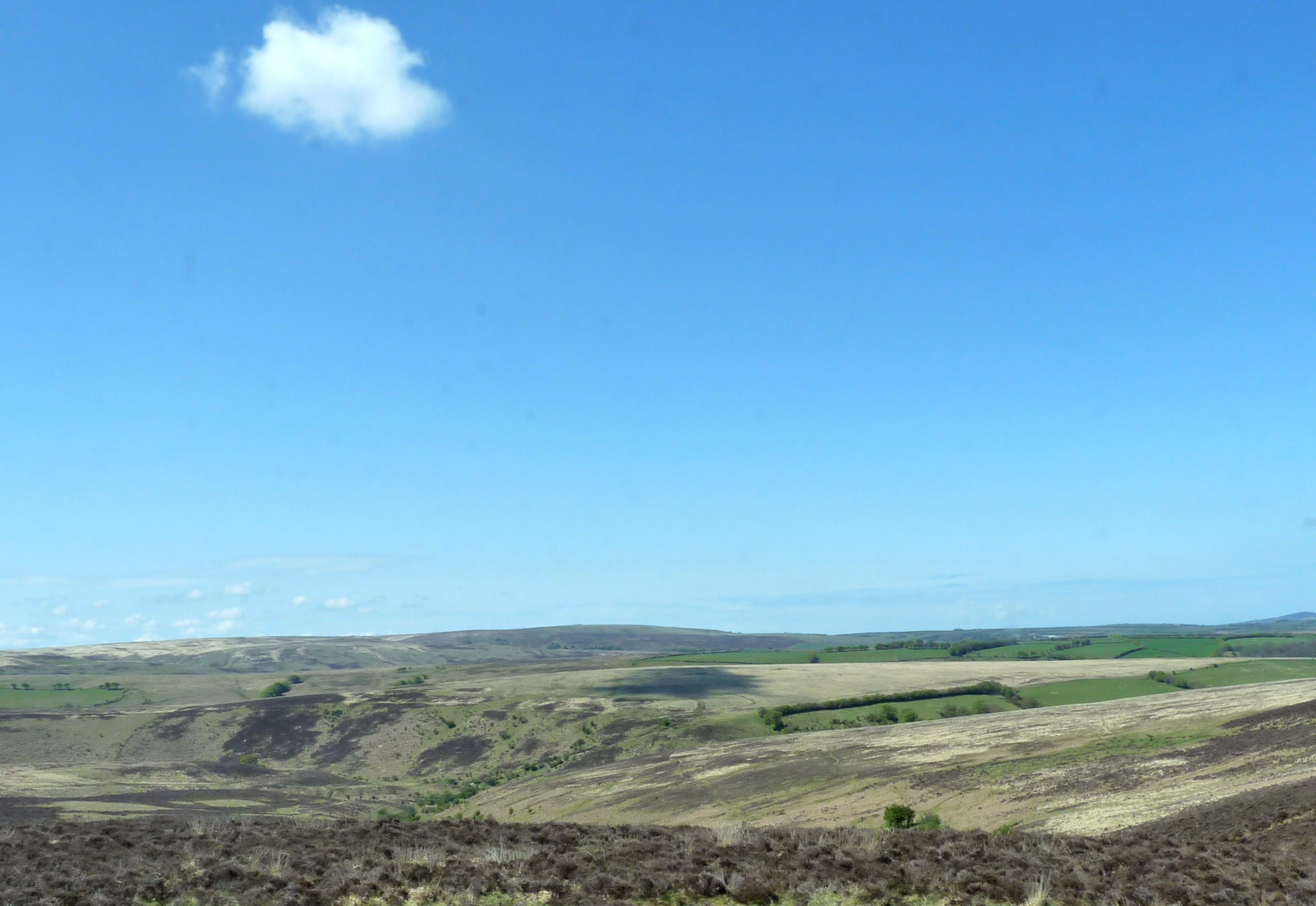
Exmoor landscape

He was a Shakespeare scholar and edited an edition of Henry V that was published in Longman's Heritage of Literature series in 1975. The less serious Shakespeare Detective and Other Short Stories contained four mystery stories authored by Burton and set in modern Stratford upon Avon but drawing on the town's connections with William Shakespeare. It was published in Longman's Structural Readers series in 1986 where the text is designed to suit particular levels of English language proficiency. Shakespeare's Life and Stage (1989), the fruit of a lifetime's study, was a major work that included an extended discussion of the bard's education, but the poor sales were a great disappointment to the author.

He wrote extensively on Devon and Cornwall including three books on Exmoor. His 1952 book of that title was described by his son John as the standard work on the area. His 1953 book on The North Devon Coast. A guide to its scenery & architecture, history & antiquities, was followed by its partner on the south Devon coast in 1954. In Devon Villages (1972), Burton described the problems unseen by tourists, such as young people leaving to find work, clergymen spread between multiple parishes, and the difficulty of forming a cricket team. Also in 1972, he produced The West Country in Robert Hale's The Regions of Britain series.

== Other activities ==
Burton was a socialist, a supporter of the Labour Party, and an anti-nuclear campaigner who in the 1960s set up a branch of the Campaign for Nuclear Disarmament in Tiverton.

He became chairman of the Exmoor Society and was quoted in the pages of The Times arguing for the preservation of the moor from ploughing and enclosure.

== Death ==
Burton died in Stafford on 6 December 2005.

== Selected publications ==
Burton's publications include:

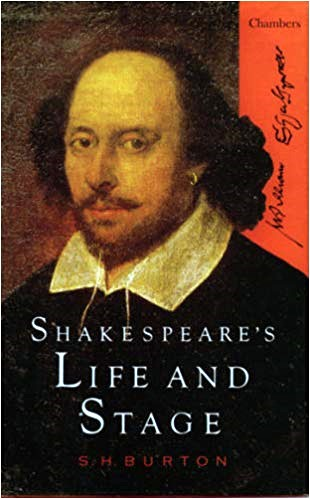
Shakespeare's Life and Stage, 1989

=== Anthologies and fiction ===
- Modern Short Stories. Longman, London, 1965.
- Science Fiction. Longmans, Green, 1967. (Ed.)
- A West Country Anthology. Robert Hale, London, 1975. (compiler) ISBN 0709148992
- Eight Ghost Stories. Structural Readers series. Longmans, Harlow, 1979. ISBN 058254078X
- Shakespeare Detective and Other Short Stories. Longman structural readers. Longman, Harlow, 1986. ISBN 0582528364
- Six Ghost Stories. Pearson Education, Harlow, 2000. ISBN 0582427339

=== Biography ===
- Shakespeare's Life and Stage. Chambers, Edinburgh, 1989. ISBN 0550210032

=== Edited classics ===
- Shakespeare, William. Henry V. Heritage of Literature series. Longman, London, 1975. (Editor and introduction) ISBN 0582348404
- Blackmore R. D. The Lorna Doone Trail, Tracing the Story of Jan Ridd and Lorna Doone in Words and Pictures. Exmoor Press. (Editor and commentary)

=== English language textbooks ===
==== 1950s ====
- The Criticism of Poetry. Longmans, Green & Co., London, 1950.
- Comprehension Practice. Longmans, Green & Co., London, 1951.
- English Study and Composition. Longmans, Green & Co., London, 1952.
- English Appreciation. Longmans, Green & Co., London, 1953.
- A Comprehensive English Course. Longmans, Green & Co., London, 1954.
- Modern Précis Practice. Longmans, Green & Co., London, 1955.
- Exercises in Criticism. Longmans, Green & Co., London, 1956.
- Handbook of English Practice. Hutchinson Educational, London, 1959.
- A First English Course. Longmans, London, 1958.
- A Second English Course. Longmans, London, 1959.

==== 1960s ====
- A Third English Course. Longmans, London, 1961.
- A Fourth English Course. Longmans, London, 1962.
- A Fifth English Course. Longmans, London, 1963.
- Writing and Reading in English: A guide for the advanced student. Longmans, London, 1966.

==== 1970s ====
- The Criticism of Prose. Longman, London, 1973.
- Using English: A language course for advanced students. Longman, London, 1976.
- African Poetry in English: An introduction to practical criticism. Macmillan, London, 1979. (With C. J. H. Chacksfield)

==== 1980s ====
- People and Communication. Longman, London, 1980.
- Mastering English Language. Macmillan, London, 1982.
- ABC of Common Errors. Longman, Essex, 1983.
- Writing Letters. Longman, Harlow, 1983.
- Mastering English Grammar. Macmillan, Basingstoke, 1984.
- Spelling. Longman, Harlow, c.1984.
- Work out English Language 'O' Level & GCSE. 1986.
- Grammar. Longman, Harlow, 1987.
- Mastering Practical Writing. Macmillan Education, Basingstoke, 1987.

==== 1990s ====
- Mastering English Language Palgrave, Basingstoke, 1992. (With J. A. Humphries) ISBN 0333515064
- Mastering Practical Writing. Macmillan, Basingstoke 1987.

=== West of England ===
- Tiverton to Exmoor. Gore Allen & Co., [Tiverton], [1951].
- Exmoor. Westaway, London, [1952].
- The North Devon Coast. A guide to its scenery & architecture, history & antiquities. Werner Laurie, London, 1953.
- Official Guide to Porlock and District. Gore Allen & Co., [Tiverton], [1953].
- The South Devon Coast. A guide to its scenery and architecture, history and antiquities. Werner Laurie, London, 1954.
- The Coasts of Cornwall. Werner Laurie, London, 1955.
- Great Men of Devon. Men of the Counties series. J. Lane, 1956. (Also Bodley Head)
- The Exmoor Companion. Cider Press, Dulverton, [1968].
- Exmoor. Hodder & Stoughton, London, 1969. 2nd 1974.
- The West Country. The Regions of Britain series. Robert Hale, London, 1972. ISBN 0709131038
- Devon Villages. Robert Hale, London, 1973. ISBN 0709136595
