= The Home Counties Magazine =

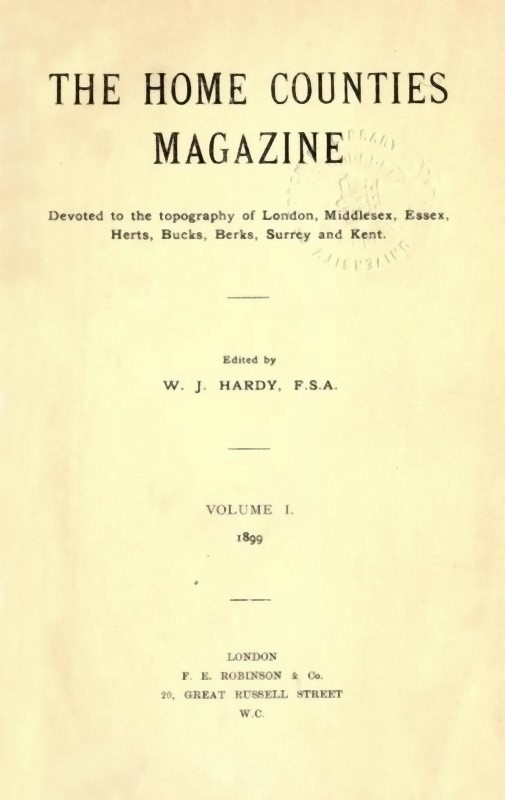
The Home Counties Magazine, Vol. I, 1899.

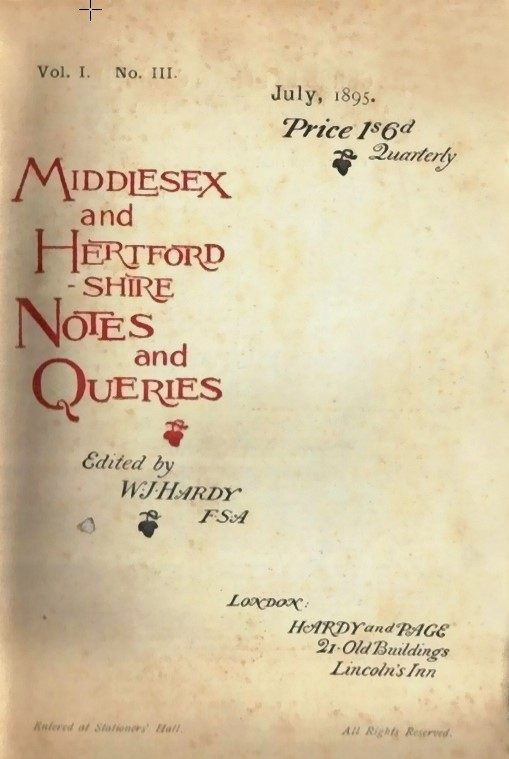
Middlesex and Hertfordshire Notes and Queries Vol. I, No. III, July 1895.

The Home Counties Magazine was a magazine of the "topography of London, Middlesex, Essex, Herts, Bucks, Berks, Surrey, and Kent", the home counties of England, that was published from 1899 to 1912. It incorporated Middlesex and Hertfordshire Notes and Queries (1895 to 1898).

== History ==
The Home Counties Magazine was established in 1899 and incorporated Middlesex and Hertfordshire Notes and Queries (1895 to 1898) and for the first six volumes had the same editor as that journal in William Hardy FSA (1857-1919). Hardy expressed the wish in the first edition of the new magazine that it would become "for London, for the places in which Londoners reside, and the places they often visit, what the old, yet ever new, Notes and Queries is for Great and Greater Britain."

The first volume included articles such as "Notes on Old Somerset House", "The Church and Parish of Warfield", and "Hertford Grammar School".

Volumes 8 onwards were edited by the legal historian William Paley Baildon FSA.

A general index of volumes 1 to 10 and a topographical index of volumes 1 to 11 were published separately.

The final edition of the magazine was issued in 1912.

== Volumes ==
=== Middlesex and Hertfordshire Notes and Queries ===
- Volume 1 (1895)
- Volume 2 (1896)
- Volume 3 (1897)
- Volume 4 (1898)

=== The Home Counties Magazine ===
- Volume 1 (1899)
- Volume 2 (1900)
- Volume 3 (1901)
- Volume 4 (1902)
- Volume 5 (1903)
- Volume 6 (1904)
- Volume 7 (1905)
- Volume 8 (1906)
- Volume 9 (1907)
- Volume 10 (1908)
- Volume 11 (1909)
- Volume 12 (1910)
- Volume 13 (1911)
- Volume 14 (1912)

== See also ==
- Bibliography of the home counties
