= Home counties =

Counties of England that surround London

Home Counties
- Country: United Kingdom
- Constituent country: England
- Region: East of England; South East England
- Counties: Usually includes: Berkshire; Buckinghamshire; Essex; Hertfordshire; Kent; Surrey; Sometimes included: Bedfordshire; Hampshire; Oxfordshire; East Sussex; West Sussex
- Time zone: UTC+00:00 (Greenwich Mean Time)
  - Summer (DST): UTC+01:00 (British Summer Time)

The former geographic counties (1889–1965) surrounding London: 1. Buckinghamshire; 2. Hertfordshire; 3. Essex; 4. Berkshire; 5. Middlesex; 6. Surrey; 7. Kent; 8. Sussex; (County of London shown in yellow)

The term home counties describes a number of English counties close to London. There is no precise definition, but the counties bordering Greater London are most likely to be described as members, namely: Berkshire, Buckinghamshire, Hertfordshire, Essex, Kent and Surrey.

Other counties farther from London – Bedfordshire, Hampshire, Oxfordshire, East Sussex and West Sussex – are sometimes also regarded as home counties, due to their proximity to London and connection to its regional economy.

The home counties come with a strong socio-economic stereotype that characterises its inhabitants as comfortable, conformist middle class people.

== Origin ==
The origin of the term "home counties" is uncertain. Marcus Crouch, writing in 1975, thought that it derived from the historic Home Circuit of courts that had surrounded London since at least the 18th century. Looking further back, he suggested that it included the counties in which, since the Tudor period, it has been possible for civil servants and politicians to have their country homes and still be able to travel into London without excessive delay when they were needed.

== Composition ==
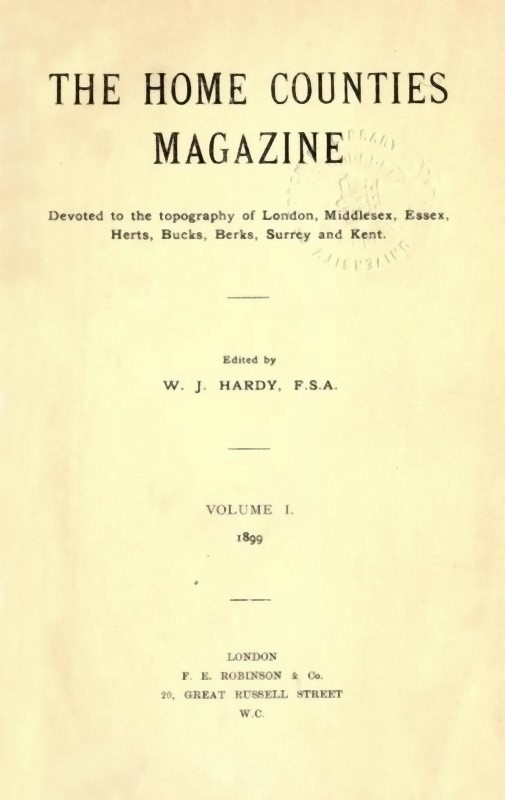
The Home Counties Magazine, 1899, a magazine of the "topography of London, Middlesex, Essex, Herts, Bucks, Berks, Surrey, and Kent"

The earliest use of the term cited in the Oxford English Dictionary is from 1695. Charles Davenant, in An Essay upon Ways and Means of Supplying the War, wrote, "The Eleven Home Counties, which are thought in Land Taxes to pay more than their proportion, viz. Surry [sic] with Southwark, Hertfordshire, Bedfordshire, Cambridgeshire, Kent, Essex, Norfolk, and Suffolk, Berks, Bucks, and Oxfordshire."

Later definitions have tended to be more narrow and Bacon's Large Scale Atlas of London and Suburbs (revised edition c. 1912) includes Berkshire, Buckingham, Essex, Hertford, Kent, Middlesex and Surrey in the "maps of the home counties".

In reviewing S. P. B. Mais's The Home Counties (Batsford The Face of Britain series, 1942), Norah Richardson noted that "the home counties" was a term in constant use but hard to define, but that Mais's definition of "the five counties around London County – Middlesex, Hertfordshire, Essex, Kent and Surrey" could not be improved upon.

The third edition of the Oxford English Dictionary (2010) defines the term as "the English counties surrounding London, into which London has extended. They comprise chiefly Essex, Kent, Surrey, and Hertfordshire." Parts of all of those historic counties are, since 1965, officially within London, although no part of Berkshire, Buckinghamshire or Sussex is. The county of Sussex is also wholly outside, and Berkshire almost wholly outside, the route of the M25 motorway, which is often treated as an unofficial perimeter of Greater London, and some definitions mention that those counties are not always included amongst the home counties, or that the term has been extended to include them.

== Inhabitants ==
The home counties have been characterised as being "inhabited on the whole by 'nice', comfortable, and conformist middle-class people" (1987) exemplified by the county of Surrey which has been described as possessing quintessential home counties characteristics of "a comfortable plasticised commuterland with respectable villas and neatly mown lawns interspersed with patches of mild scenery". In fiction, the character of Margot Leadbetter in the BBC sitcom The Good Life, set in Surbiton, formerly in Surrey, has been described by The Spectator as "a Home Counties Conservative to her fingertips". The Home Counties are closely associated with the high status Received Pronunciation (RP) accent.

Marcus Crouch, however, has made the point that the home counties (together with London) have been more affected by migration from both within and outside the United Kingdom than any other region of the country, making them the most cosmopolitan region of England and meaning that there is no typical home counties inhabitant. One result of this diversity, he argues, is that local loyalties are shallower in the home counties than in, for instance, Yorkshire or parts of Scotland where there has been less population mobility.

== Geology ==
Marcus Crouch has identified, as one of the principal characteristics of the home counties, their shared chalk geology that is broadly mirrored north and south of the Thames.

== Economy ==
The home counties are some of the wealthiest in Britain with the towns of Virginia Water, Esher and Weybridge, all in Surrey, ranked in one 2019 survey as having some of the highest average house prices in the country. However, a 2011 report described the perception that South East England, the official region of England in which most of the home counties are located, was universally wealthy as inaccurate and noted that 500,000 people in the region lived in areas that were within the 20% most deprived areas in the country with deprivation concentrated in coastal areas such as Margate (Kent) and Hastings (East Sussex). Significant areas of deprivation were also found in the urban areas of south Hampshire and Slough.

== In formal use ==
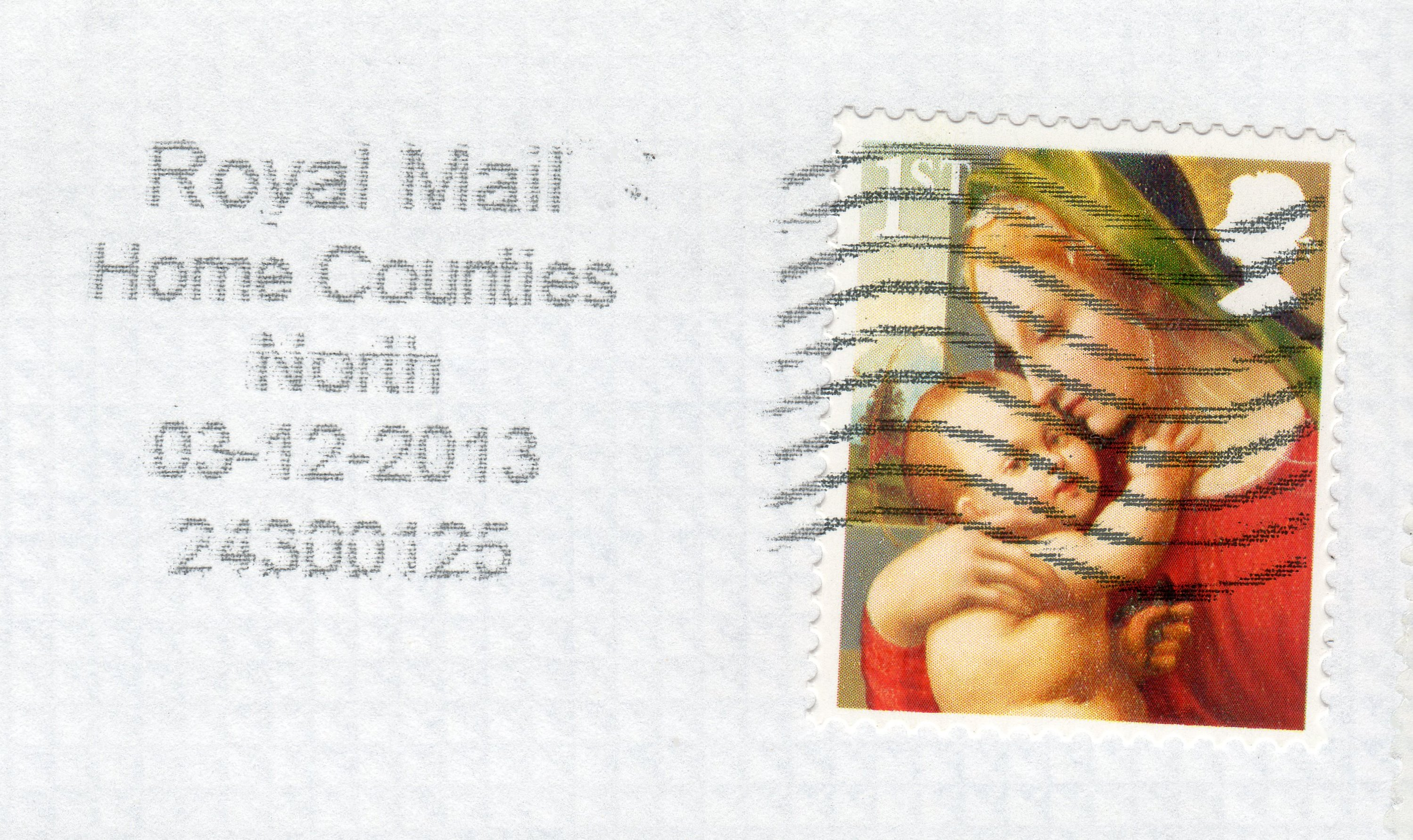
"Home Counties North" mail centre (in Hemel Hempstead) franked on a letter in 2013

Multiple interpretations of the term have been used in legislation and by official bodies. In the twentieth century, for instance, as follows: (the table includes all the areas mentioned above):

- 1908: The Home Counties Division of the Territorial Force comprised units recruiting in Middlesex, Kent, Surrey and Sussex.
- 1920: The London and Home Counties Electricity District consisted of the counties of London and Middlesex; and parts of Berkshire, Buckinghamshire, Essex, Hertfordshire, Kent and Surrey.
- 1924: The London and Home Counties Traffic Advisory Committee, covering the London Traffic Area: London, Middlesex, and parts of Buckinghamshire, Essex, Hertfordshire, Kent, and Surrey.
- 1926: The Home Counties (Music and Dancing) Licensing Act regulated activities in all parts of Buckinghamshire, Essex, Hertfordshire, Kent and Surrey within 20 miles of the City of London or City of Westminster.
- 1938: Green Belt (London and Home Counties) Act limited development in parts of Middlesex, Kent, Buckinghamshire, Surrey, Essex, Berkshire, and Hertfordshire.
- 1948: The Home Counties Brigade was formed to administer the infantry regiments of the City and County of London, Kent, Middlesex, Surrey, and Sussex.
- 1995: The Valuation Office rating manual defined both inner and outer home counties, with the inner home counties being defined as inside the M25 motorway. The outer home counties included Kent, Surrey, Sussex, Buckinghamshire, Berkshire, Bedfordshire, Essex, Hertfordshire, Oxfordshire, Hampshire. Parts of Dorset and Cambridgeshire were included in the outer home counties with Bournemouth and Cambridge being home counties exclaves.

County	1851 Post Office Directory (Note: 1851 Post Office Directory of the Six Home Counties covered Essex, Herts, Kent, Middlesex, Surrey and Sussex.)	1908 Home Counties Division	1920 London and Home Counties Electricity District	1924 London and Home Counties Traffic Advisory Committee	1926 Home Counties (Music and Dancing) Licensing Act	1938 Green Belt (London and Home Counties) Act	1948 Home Counties Brigade	1995 Valuation Office Rating Manual
Bedfordshire								Yes
Berkshire			Yes (part)		Yes		Yes	Yes
Buckinghamshire			Yes (part)	Yes (part)	Yes		Yes	Yes
Cambridgeshire								Yes (part)
Dorset								Yes (part)
Essex	Yes		Yes (part)	Yes (part)	Yes			Yes
Hampshire								Yes
Hertfordshire	Yes		Yes (part)	Yes (part)	Yes	Yes		Yes
Kent	Yes	Yes	Yes (part)	Yes (part)	Yes	Yes	Yes	Yes
Middlesex	Yes	Yes	Yes	Yes	Yes	Yes	Yes	Ceremonial county dissolved in 1965
Oxfordshire								Yes
Surrey	Yes	Yes	Yes (part)	Yes (part)	Yes	Yes	Yes	Yes
Sussex	Yes	Yes				Yes	Yes	Yes

== See also ==
- Bibliography of the home counties
- London metropolitan area
- Metro-land
- Suburb
