= John Talbot White =

British academic and writer (1925–1983)

- Born: 5 January 1925; Lewisham, London, UK
- Died: 22 April 1983 (aged 58); Blackheath, London, UK
- Occupations: Lecturer, naturalist, author
- Known for: Natural history writing

John Talbot White (5 January 1925 – 22 April 1983) was a British lecturer, naturalist, and writer. He was known for his contributions to The Guardian's Country Diary and for his books about the topography and natural history of South East England and particularly the county of Kent. He took his own life after becoming depressed following redundancy, but not before posting his last column to The Guardian.

== Early life ==
John Talbot White was born in Lewisham on 5 January 1925, one of three sons of a tobacco sampler. He described his mother Elizabeth as having "green fingers". As a boy he developed a deep interest in the countryside around London that was reinforced when he was evacuated to the Kent/Sussex border during the Second World War.

He served in the Royal Navy as a petty officer for the last two years of the war and saw action in Greece and the Aegean.

== Writing ==
White lived and worked for many years in Northumbria in the north of England and his early published works were of a literary type for the private Tragara Press in Edinburgh. Later he turned to British topographical and natural history subjects of the South East of England and particularly the county of Kent, becoming a stalwart contributor to The Guardian's Country Diary column. His writing included educational works and two volumes for The Regions of Britain series, one on the Scottish borders (1973) and another on the Kent, Surrey and Sussex area (1977).

In 1978, his Countryman's Guide to the South-East was praised in The Observer as the work of a "precise naturalist". George Seddon, reviewing the book for The Guardian, described White as having the ideal qualities of a country diarist of an "observant pair of eyes, infectious enthusiasm, and an unaffected prose style" as he chronicled the Kent marshes in January, the Sussex Downs in March, and the Surrey heaths in August. The cover was by Rowland Hilder.

As well as describing seasonal changes, White was careful to place natural features in their historical contexts, acknowledging, for instance, that the hedgerow was an innovation by man, and that modern farm buildings that jarred with the landscape now would probably become as accepted as the oast house with the passage of time. Similarly with hedgerows, White noted their varieties and historical background; tall, mainly hawthorn, hedges in Kent surrounding hop gardens that date from the introduction of hops in the Tudor period, and others that denoted the boundaries of Saxon parishes and included many different species such as blackthorn, guelder rose, hawthorn, and yew, and a similarly wide range of birds and other wildlife that lived in them or fed off their fruit. He wrote more on the hedgerow in his 1980 book of that title for which Eric Thomas provided the illustrations. The book tells the story of the hedgerow from before the Saxons to the twentieth century when it is threatened by modern farming methods.

== Employment ==
He was employed as a lecturer in geography and natural history at Goldsmiths College in London. In 1983, having no family responsibilities himself, he took redundancy from his job in order to save a younger man with a family from losing his job.

Outside work, he sang and spoke Breton, French, Greek, and Italian.

== Death and legacy ==
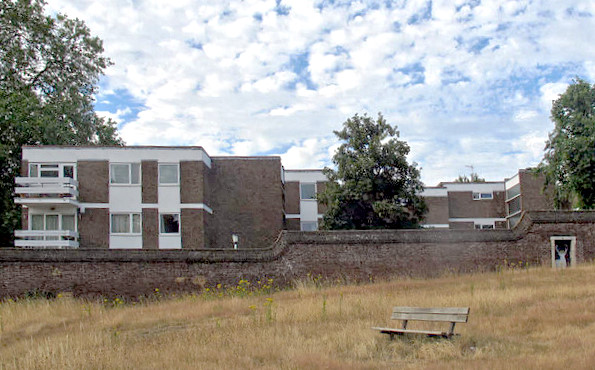
Greyladies Gardens, Blackheath

White died by suicide at 18 Greyladies Gardens, Blackheath, London, on 22 April 1983, having taken anti-depressant pills and whisky. He was said at the inquest into his death to have become depressed following his redundancy and to have been anxious about problems with his home.

His suicide note recorded that he had just posted his last column to The Guardian. It was published in the paper on 27 April on the subject of how a mouse escaped a weasel and its close observation of the struggle between the two was characteristic of White, as he told how the mouse escaped by being more nimble than the weasel, leaping "the ground flora like a hurdler", at one point jumping over the weasel's back, and on another meeting the weasel coming in the opposite direction as both ran past each other "like characters from a comic strip".

He left an estate of £132,398. His last book, Country London, was published posthumously in 1984.

== Selected publications ==
White's publications include:

- The Tattered Outlaw. Tragara Press, Edinburgh, 1957. (poems)
- A Sequence for Modigliani. Tragara Press, Edinburgh, 1965.
- Of Forests and Silence. Tragara Press, Edinburgh, 1965. (poems)
- An Index to Lawrence Durrell's Reflections on a Marine Venus. Tragara Press, Edinburgh, 1968.
- The Death of a King: Being extracts from contemporary accounts of the Battle of Branxton Moor, September, 1513, commonly known as Flodden Field, wherein was slain James IV, King of Scotland. Tragara Press, Edinburgh, 1970. (Editor)
- The Scottish Border and Northumberland: Berwickshire, Roxburghshire, Northumberland. Eyre Methuen, 1973. (The Regions of Britain) ISBN 0413281302
- A Country Diary: Kent. Arthur J. Cassell, Sheerness, 1974.
- Spotlight on Europe. Macmillan, London, 1975. ISBN 0333143566
- Geography of the British Isles. Heinemann Educational, London, 1976. (With Norman J. Graves)
- The Parklands of Kent, Arthur J. Cassell, Sheerness, 1976.
- The South East, Down and Weald: Kent, Surrey and Sussex. Eyre Methuen, London, 1977. (The Regions of Britain) ISBN 0413320901
- The Countryman's Guide to the South-East. Routledge and Kegan Paul, London, 1978. ISBN 0710088388
- Hedgerow. Ash & Grant, London, 1980. Illustrated by Eric Thomas. ISBN 0904069397 Later editions Dorling Kindersley.
- Country London. Routledge & Kegan Paul, London, 1984. (With Oliver Caldecott) ISBN 0710208871
