= William Paley Baildon =

William Paley Baildon FSA (1859–1924) was a barrister of Lincoln's Inn, legal historian, and author. He was a fellow of the Society of Antiquaries of London and the editor of The Home Counties Magazine (1906–1912). A collection of papers relating to Baildon and the Baildon family, whose history he wrote, are held by the West Yorkshire Archive Service in Bradford. He is buried on the western side of Highgate Cemetery.

== Selected publications ==
- Select Civil Pleas. Vol. I A. D. 1200-1203. Bernard Quaritch, London, 1890.
- Select Cases in Chancery: A.D. 1364 to 1471. Bernard Quaritch, London, 1896.
- Court Rolls of the Manor of Wakefield, vol. I. 1274 to 1297. (editor) The Yorkshire Archæological Society. Record Series, vol. XXIX (1901). xx, 334 pp.
- Baildon and the Baildons; A History of a Yorkshire Manor and Family. 1912.
- Inquisitions Post Mortem Relating to Yorkshire, of the Reigns of Henry IV and Henry V. 1918. (Edited with John William Clay)
