= William Hardie (disambiguation) =

William Hardie may refer to:

- William Hardie (1862–1916), Scottish classical scholar
- W. F. R. Hardie (1902–1990), Scottish classical scholar (son of the above)
- William Hardie (archbishop of the West Indies) (1878–1950)
- William Hardie (bishop of Ballarat) (1904–1980)

== See also ==
- William Hardy (disambiguation)
