= E. B. Pinniger =

British recording engineer and amateur entomologist

- Born: 12 April 1913; St Pancras, London, England
- Died: 18 August 2005 (aged 92); Windsor and Maidenhead, England
- Occupation: Recording engineer
- Known for: First with Cynthia Longfield to identify Coenagrion scitulum in Britain.

Edward Bertram Pinniger FRES (12 April 1913 – 18 August 2005) was a British recording engineer and amateur entomologist. In 1946, he and Cynthia Longfield of the Natural History Museum were the first to identify Coenagrion scitulum (the dainty damselfly) in Britain.

His 1946 survey of Neuroptera for The London Naturalist, was reprinted as The Neuroptera of the Home Counties. In it he identified 12 species of Neuroptera in central London.

He was a fellow of the Royal Entomological Society and a member of the London Natural History Society (LNHS).

== Early life and family ==
Edward Pinniger was born in St Pancras, London, on 12 April 1913. His mother's maiden name was Cook. In 1940 he married Leonora Forth in York.

== Career ==
Pinniger was a recording engineer at British Homophone when he supervised work on new recording techniques being developed by Cecil E. Watts whose wife Agnes had unsuccessfully attempted to record the sound of grasshoppers on disc. In 1952 he read a paper on "Processing and pressing of disk recordings" in Portsmouth. In 1971 he lectured on "Processing of gramophone records" and in 1977 contributed a chapter on disc manufacture to John Borwick's Sound Recording Practice: A handbook (Oxford University Press, c. 1977) compiled for the Association of Professional Recording Studios.

== Entomology ==
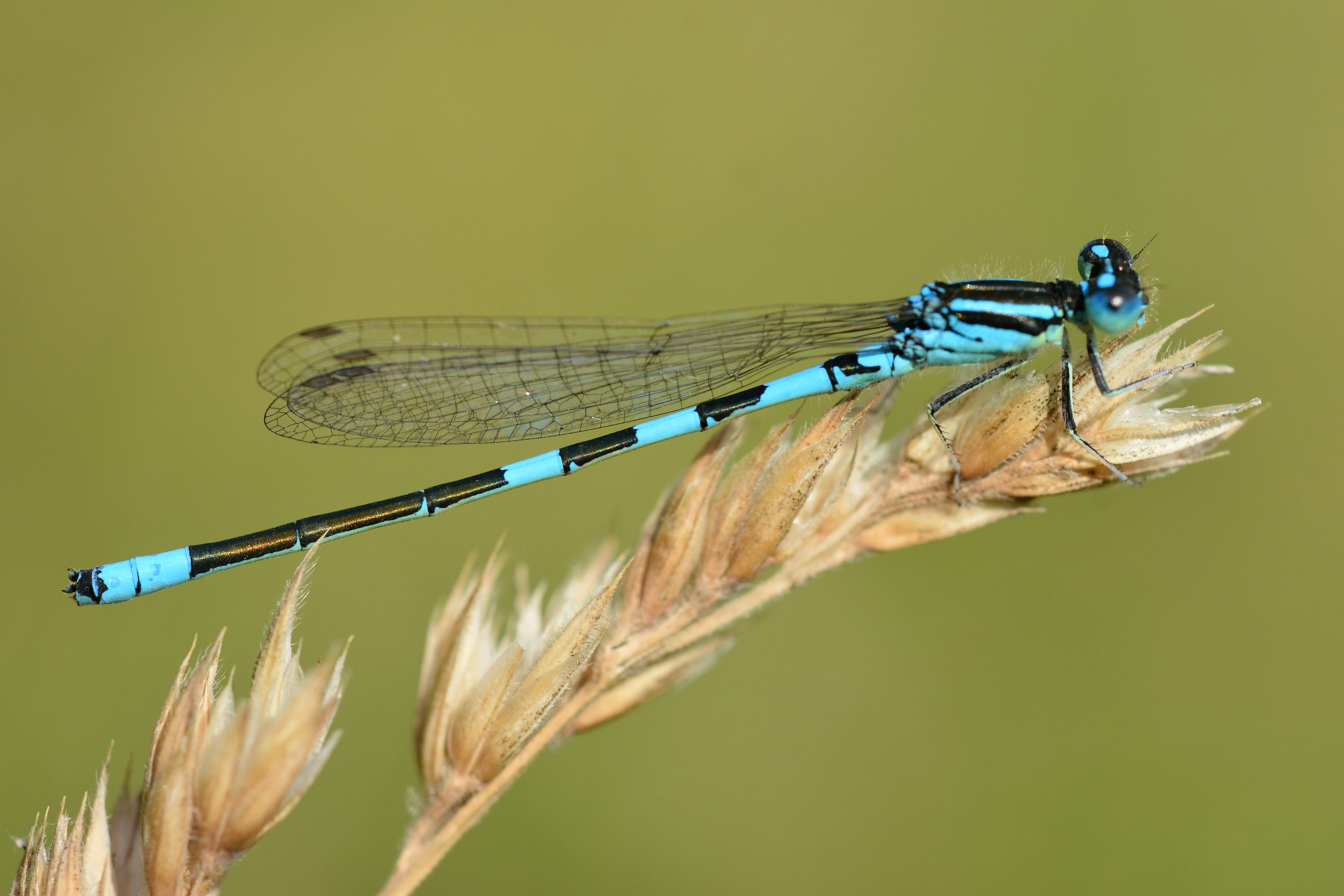
Coenagrion scitulum

A keen entomologist, Pinniger was a fellow of the Royal Entomological Society and a member of the London Natural History Society (LNHS). In 1946, he published a survey of Neuroptera for their journal The London Naturalist which was reprinted as The Neuroptera of the Home Counties. In it he identified 12 species of Neuroptera in central London but by 1981 five had yet to be found in Buckingham Palace garden, a reservoir of insect life in central London.

A resident of Chingford, on the border of Essex, he led LNHS expeditions in the county. On 21 July 1946, with Cynthia Longfield of the Natural History Museum, he was searching dykes near Benfleet in Essex for Lestes dryas when they were the first to detect Coenagrion scitulum (the dainty damselfly) in Britain. They first captured a male and then two females three quarters of a mile away. The species was subsequently determined by Longfield at the Natural History Museum.

== Death ==
Pinniger died in the district of Windsor and Maidenhead, England, on 18 August 2005.

== Selected publications ==
=== Entomology ===
- "Notes on the Dragonflies of Epping Forest", The London Naturalist, Vol. 12 (1933), pp. 66–72.
- "The Epping Forest Survey: Lepidoptera (Butterflies)", The London Naturalist, Vol. 24 (1944), pp. 62–63.
- "The Neuroptera of the Home Counties", The London Naturalist, Vol. 25 (1946), pp. 24–30.
- The Neuroptera of the Home Counties. London, 1946. London Naturalist reprint No. 38.
- "Coenagrion scitulum Rambur, A dragonfly new to Britain", The London Naturalist, Vol. 26 (1947), p. 80.

=== Sound recording ===
- "Processing and Pressing of Disk Recordings", Sound Recording, Vol. 3, No. 12 (Sep. 1952), pp. 285–287.
- "Disc manufacture" in John Borwick (Ed.) Sound Recording Practice: A handbook. London: Oxford University Press, [c. 1977]. ISBN 9780193119277
