= William Le Hardy =

Lieutenant-Colonel William Henry Clement Le Hardy (1889 – 28 December 1961) was an English archivist.

== Early life ==
Le Hardy was born into a family of archivists. His great-uncle, Sir Thomas Hardy and his grandfather Sir William Hardy were Deputy Keepers of the Public Records, and his father William John Hardy (died 1919) was a record agent in the firm of Hardy and Page, later Hardy and Reckitt. His uncle on his mother's side was William Page, record agent and general editor of the Victoria County History.

Hardy was educated at Westminster School and Oxford University. He served in World War I in France (where he was seriously wounded, and decorated). Between the wars he commanded the 23rd (County of London) Battalion, The London Regiment, in the Territorial Army; and in World War II he saw active service in the Middle East and Italy.

== Career ==
Following his father's death in 1919 Hardy took control of the family firm, succeeding his father as editor of the calendars of the Quarter Sessions records of Hertfordshire and Middlesex, and working on those of Buckinghamshire. In 1946 Hardy became county archivist of Middlesex (three days a week) and Hertfordshire (two days a week), resigning the Middlesex post in 1956 to concentrate on Hertfordshire. "To his drive and initiative both counties owe the rapid development of their record offices on modern lines and the growth of their record holdings." As a county archivist, he had the reputation of being attentive to the needs to users of the archive.

Le Hardy was a founder-member of the British Records Association in 1932, and served almost continuously on its council until his death, aged 72. Also a founder-member of the Society of Local Archivists, he was chairman of its council from 1949 to 1954, and elected a vice-president when the Society became the Society of Archivists in 1955. He was elected a Fellow of the Society of Antiquaries of London, and was active in its Essay Club.

== Works ==
- (with Dorothy Bushby) Wormley in Hertfordshire, Staples Press, 1954
- Guide to the Hertfordshire Record Office, vol I, 1960
