= William John Hardy =

English archivist and antiquarian (1857–1919)

William John Hardy (29 September 1857 – 17 July 1919) was an English archivist and antiquarian.

== Life ==
He was born in London, the younger son of Sir William Hardy. Hardy like his father was connected with the Historical Manuscripts Commission, and became known as a learned legal antiquarian and inspector for the Commission. He also set up a business with William Page, his brother-in-law, as record agent; Hardy employed Page, an engineer, and trained him as a historian.

Hardy & Page worked in particular on the Hertfordshire county records, for a county council pioneering the maintenance of its local archives. This work and that of George Herbert Fowler for Bedfordshire proved widely influential. The firm was taken over by his son, William Le Hardy.

Hardy was Hon. M.A. of Durham University, and was a Fellow of the Society of Antiquaries, serving on its Council. He died at Sidlesham, near Chichester, from heart failure.

== Works ==
He edited State Papers, and Documents Illustrative of English Church History with Henry Gee. He also edited Middlesex and Hertfordshire Notes and Queries from 1895 to 1898, and the first six volumes of The Home Counties Magazine, 1899 to 1904.

Other works included:

- A Calendar to the Feet of Fines for London and Middlesex (1892)
- Book-Plates (1893)
- The Handwriting of the Kings and Queens of England (1893)
- Lighthouses, Their History and Romance (1895)
- Documents Illustrative of English Church History (1896) with Henry Gee
- A History of the Rolls House and Chapel (1896)
- The Stamp Collector (1898) with Edward Denny Bacon
- Middlesex County Records (1905)
- Report on the Manuscripts of the Earl of Verulam, Preserved at Gorhambury (1906)
- Bedfordshire County Records (1907) with William Page
