= Formation of the United Kingdom =

Territorial evolution of the UK

The evolution of the states of the British Isles. Those states evolved from the conquests and mergers of earlier states.

The formation of the United Kingdom of Great Britain and Northern Ireland has involved personal and political union across Great Britain and the wider British Isles. The United Kingdom is the most recent of a number of sovereign states that have been established in Great Britain at different periods in history, in different combinations and under a variety of polities. Historian Norman Davies has counted sixteen different states over the past 2,000 years.

By the start of the 16th century, the number of states in Great Britain had been reduced to two: the Kingdom of England (which included Wales and controlled Ireland) and the Kingdom of Scotland. The once independent Principality of Wales fell under the control of English monarchs from the Statute of Rhuddlan in 1284. The Union of Crowns in 1603, the accidental consequence of a royal marriage one hundred years earlier, united the kingdoms in a personal union, though full political union in the form of the Kingdom of Great Britain required a Treaty of Union in 1706 and Acts of Union in 1707 (to ratify the Treaty).

The Acts of Union 1800 united the Kingdom of Great Britain with the Kingdom of Ireland, which had been gradually brought under English control between 1541 and 1691, to form the United Kingdom of Great Britain and Ireland in 1801. Independence for the Irish Free State in 1922 followed the partition of the island of Ireland two years previously, with six of the nine counties of the province of Ulster remaining within the UK, which then changed to the current name in 1927 of the United Kingdom of Great Britain and Northern Ireland.

In the 20th century, the rise of Welsh and Scottish nationalism and resolution of the Troubles in Ireland resulted in the establishment of devolved parliaments or assemblies for Northern Ireland, Scotland and Wales. Although separatism has increased in support since devolution was introduced.

== Background ==
=== England's conquest of Wales ===
Through internal struggles and dynastic marriage alliances, the Welsh became more united until Owain Gwynedd (1100–1170) became the first Welsh ruler to use the title princeps Wallensium (prince of the Welsh). After invading England, land-hungry Normans started pushing into the relatively weak Welsh Marches, setting up a number of lordships in the eastern part of the country and the border areas. In response, the usually fractious Welsh, who still retained control of the north and west of Wales, started to unite around leaders such as Owain Gwynedd's grandson Llywelyn the Great (1173–1240), who is known to have described himself as "prince of all North Wales". Llywelyn wrestled concessions out of Magna Carta in 1215 and received the fealty of other Welsh lords in 1216 at the council at Aberdyfi, becoming the first Prince of Wales. His grandson, Llywelyn ap Gruffudd, also secured the recognition of the title Prince of Wales from Henry III with the Treaty of Montgomery in 1267. However, a succession of disputes, including the imprisonment of Llywelyn's wife Eleanor, daughter of Simon de Montfort, culminated in the first invasion by Edward I. Following a military defeat, the Treaty of Aberconwy in 1277 reasserted Llywelyn's fealty to the King of England.

In 1282, following another rebellion, Edward I finally made a permanent conquest. With Llywelyn dead, the King took over his lands and dispossessed various other allied princes of northern and western Wales, and across that area Edward established the counties of Anglesey, Caernarfonshire, Flintshire, Merionethshire, Cardiganshire and Carmarthenshire. The Statute of Rhuddlan formally established Edward's rule over Wales two years later although Welsh law continued to be used. Remaining princes became marcher lords. Edward's son (later Edward II), who had been born in Wales, was made Prince of Wales. The tradition of bestowing the title "Prince of Wales" on the heir of the British Monarch continues to the present day. To help maintain his dominance, Edward constructed a series of great stone castles.

Initially, the Crown had only indirect control over much of Wales because the marcher lords (ruling over independent lordships in most of the country) were independent from direct Crown control. The exception was the lands of the Principality of Wales in the north and west of the country, which was held personally by the King (or the heir to the Crown) but was not incorporated into the Kingdom of England. However, between the 13th and 16th centuries the Crown gradually acquired most of the marcher lordships, usually through inheritance, until almost all of Wales came under Crown control. Nevertheless, the whole of Wales – that is, the Principality, marcher lordships held by the Crown and marcher lordships held by others – remained outside of the legal and constitutional structures of the Kingdom of England.

There was no major uprising except that led by Owain Glyndŵr a century later, against Henry IV of England. In 1404 Glyndŵr was crowned Prince of Wales in the presence of emissaries from France, Spain, and Scotland; he went on to hold parliamentary assemblies at several Welsh towns, including Machynlleth. The rebellion was ultimately to founder, however. Glyndŵr went into hiding in 1412, and peace was more or less restored in Wales by 1415.

The power of the marcher lords was ended in 1535, when the political and administrative union of England and Wales was completed. The Laws in Wales Act 1535 annexed Wales to England and extended English law to Wales, abolished the marcher lordships and partitioned their lands into the counties of Brecon, Denbigh, Monmouth, Montgomery, and Radnor while adding parts to Gloucester, Hereford, and Salop. (Monmouthshire was wholly subsumed into the court structure of England and so omitted from the subsequent Laws in Wales Act 1542, which led to ambiguity about its status as part of England or Wales.) The Act also extended the Law of England to both England and Wales and made English the only permissible language for official purposes. This had the effect of creating an English-speaking ruling class amongst the Welsh, at a time when Welsh was the language of the great majority. Wales was also now represented in Parliament at Westminster.

=== English Conquest of Ireland ===
By the 12th century, Ireland was divided. Power was exercised by the heads of a few regional dynasties vying with each other for supremacy over the whole island. In 1155 Pope Adrian IV issued the papal bull Laudabiliter giving the Norman King Henry II of England lordship over Ireland. The bull granted Henry the right to invade Ireland in order to reform Church practices. When the King of Leinster Diarmuid MacMorroug was forcibly exiled from his kingdom by the new High King, Ruaidri mac Tairrdelbach Ua Conchobair, he obtained permission from Henry II of England to use Norman forces to regain his kingdom. The Normans landed in Ireland in 1169, and within a short time Leinster was reclaimed by Diarmait, who named his son-in-law, Richard de Clare, heir to his kingdom. This caused consternation to Henry, who feared the establishment of a rival Norman state in Ireland.

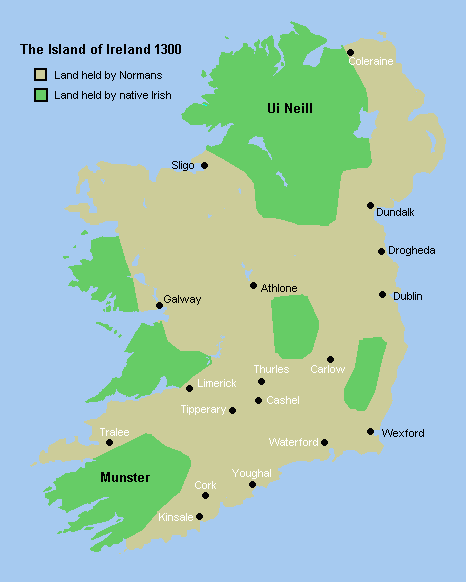
The extent of Norman control of Ireland in 1300

With the authority of the papal bull Henry landed with a large fleet in 1171 and claimed sovereignty over the island. A peace treaty followed in 1175, with the Irish High King keeping lands outside Leinster, which had passed to Henry on the expected death of both Diarmait and de Clare. When the High King lost his authority Henry awarded his Irish territories to his younger son John with the title Dominus Hiberniae ("Lord of Ireland") in 1185. When John unexpectedly became King of England, the Lordship of Ireland fell directly under the English Crown. The title of Lord of Ireland and King of England fell into personal union. Throughout the 13th century the policy of the English Kings was to weaken the power of the Norman Lords in Ireland.

There was a resurgence of Gaelic power as rebellious attacks stretched Norman resources. Politics and events in Gaelic Ireland also served to draw the settlers deeper into the orbit of the Irish. When the Black Death arrived in Ireland in 1348 it hit the English and Norman inhabitants who lived in towns and villages far harder than it did the native Irish, who lived in more dispersed rural settlements. After it had passed, Gaelic Irish language and customs came to dominate the countryside again. The English-controlled area shrunk back to the Pale, a fortified area around Dublin.

Outside the Pale, the Hiberno-Norman lords adopted the Irish language and customs. Over the following centuries they sided with the indigenous Irish in political and military conflicts with England and generally stayed Catholic after the Reformation. The authorities in the Pale grew so worried about the "Gaelicisation" of Ireland that they passed special legislation banning those of English descent from speaking the Irish language, wearing Irish clothes, or inter-marrying with the Irish. Since the government in Dublin had little real authority, however, the Statutes did not have much effect. By the end of the 15th century, the ruling English authority in Ireland had almost all disappeared.

In 1532, Henry VIII broke with Papal authority. While the English, the Welsh, and the Scots accepted Protestantism, the Irish remained Catholic. This affected Ireland's relationship with England for the next four hundred years since the English tried to re-conquer and colonise Ireland to prevent Ireland being a base for Catholic forces that were trying to overthrow the Protestant settlement in England.

From 1536, Henry VIII decided to conquer Ireland and bring it under crown control so the island would not become a base for future rebellions or foreign invasions of England. In 1541, he upgraded Ireland from a lordship to a full kingdom. Henry was proclaimed King of Ireland at a meeting of the Irish Parliament. With the institutions of government in place, the next step was to extend the control of the English Kingdom of Ireland over all of its claimed territory. The re-conquest was completed during the reigns of Elizabeth and James I, after several bloody conflicts. However, the English were not successful in converting the Catholic Irish to the Protestant religion, and the brutal methods used by Crown authority to pacify the country heightened resentment of English rule.

From the mid-16th and into the early 17th century, Crown governments carried out a policy of colonisation known as Plantations. Scottish and English Protestants were sent as colonists to the provinces of Munster, Ulster, and the counties of Laois and Offaly. These settlers, who had a British Protestant identity, would form the ruling class of future British administrations in Ireland. A series of Penal Laws discriminated against all faiths other than the established (Anglican) Church of Ireland.

=== Personal Union: Union of the Crowns ===
The first coat of arms for Great Britain, as used in the Kingdom of England, from 1603

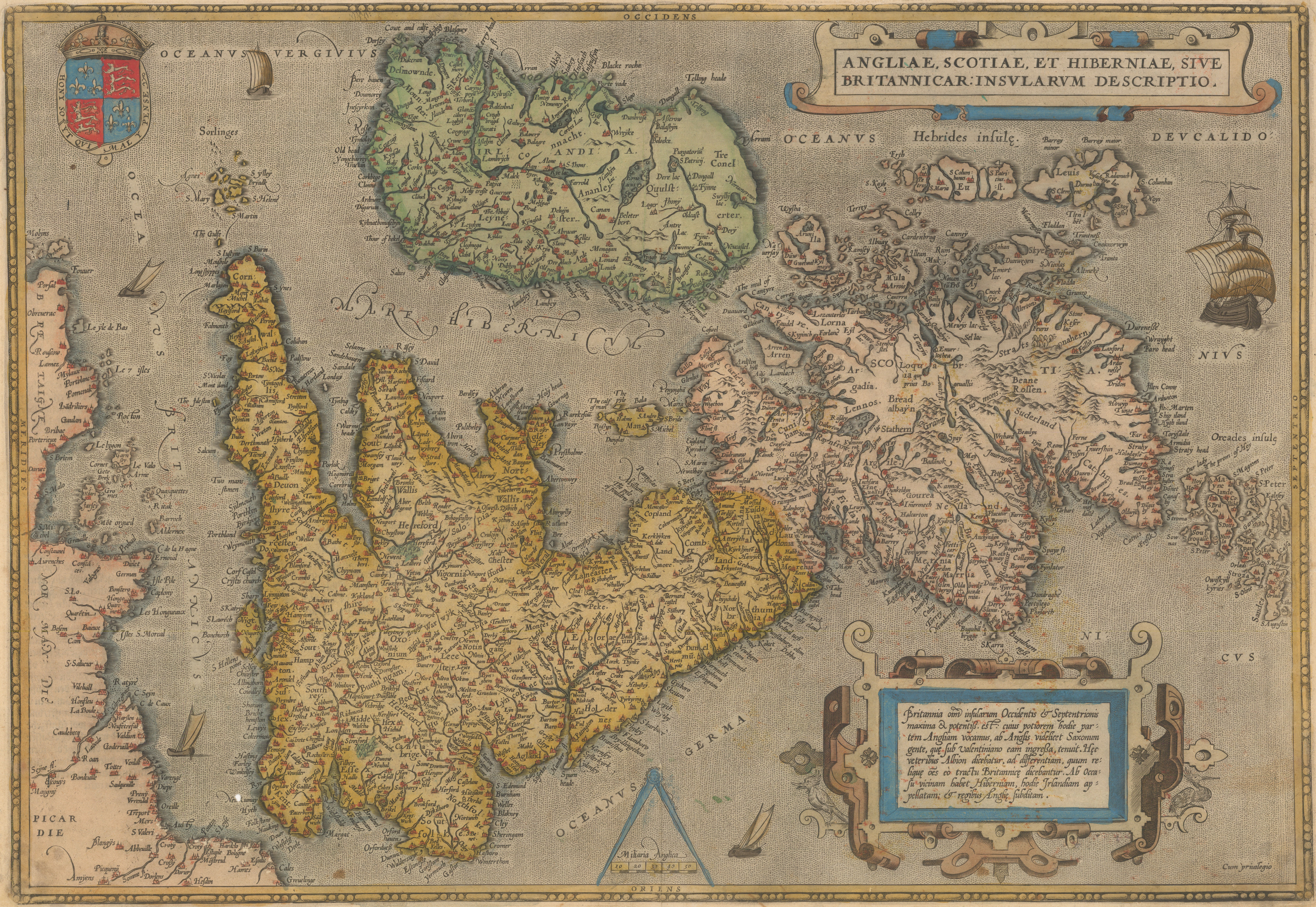
A 16th century map of England, Scotland, Wales and Ireland prior to unification

In August 1503 James IV, King of Scots, married Margaret Tudor, the eldest daughter of Henry VII of England. Almost 100 years later, when Elizabeth I was in the last decade of her reign, it was clear to all that James VI of Scotland, the great-grandson of James IV and Margaret Tudor, was the only generally acceptable heir to the English throne. From 1601, Elizabeth I's chief minister Sir Robert Cecil maintained a secret correspondence with James in order to prepare in advance for a smooth succession. Elizabeth died on 24 March 1603, and James was proclaimed king in London later the same day. Despite sharing a monarchy, Scotland and England continued as separate countries with separate parliaments for over one hundred more years.

James had the idealistic ambition of building on the personal union of the crowns of Scotland and England so as to establish a permanent Union of the Crowns under one monarch, one parliament, and one law. He insisted that English and Scots should "join and coalesce together in a sincere and perfect union, as two twins bred in one belly, to love one another as no more two but one estate". James's ambitions were greeted with very little enthusiasm, as one by one members of parliament rushed to defend the ancient name and realm of England. All sorts of legal objections were raised: all laws would have to be renewed and all treaties renegotiated. For James, whose experience of parliaments was limited to the stage-managed and semi-feudal Scottish variety, the self-assurance – and obduracy – of the English version, which had long experience of upsetting monarchs, was an obvious shock. The Scots were no more enthusiastic than the English because they feared being reduced to the status of Wales or Ireland. In October 1604, James assumed the title "King of Great Britain" by proclamation rather than statute, although Sir Francis Bacon told him he could not use the title in "any legal proceeding, instrument or assurance". The two realms continued to maintain separate parliaments. The Union of the Crowns had begun a process that would lead to the eventual unification of the two kingdoms. However, in the ensuing hundred years, strong religious and political differences continued to divide the kingdoms, and common royalty could not prevent occasions of internecine warfare.

James did not create a British Crown, but he did, in one sense at least, create the British as a distinct group of people. In 1607 large tracts of land in Ulster fell to the crown. A new Plantation was started, made up of Protestant settlers from Scotland and England. Over the years the settlers, surrounded by the hostile Catholic Irish, gradually cast off their separate English and Scottish roots, becoming British in the process, as a means of emphasising their "otherness" from their Gaelic neighbors. It was the one corner of the British Isles where Britishness became truly meaningful as a political and cultural identity in its own right, as opposed to a gloss on older and deeper national associations.

Ruling over the diverse kingdoms of England, Scotland, and Ireland proved difficult for James and his successor Charles, particularly when they tried to impose religious uniformity on the Three Kingdoms. There were different religious conditions in each country. Henry VIII had made himself head of the Church of England, which was reformed under Edward VI and became Anglican under Elizabeth I. Protestantism became intimately associated with national identity in England. Roman Catholicism was seen as the national enemy, especially as embodied in France and Spain. However, Catholicism remained the religion of most people in Ireland and became a symbol of native resistance to the Tudor re-conquest of Ireland in the 16th century. Scotland had a national church, the Presbyterian Church of Scotland, although much of the highlands remained Catholic. With the support of the Episcopalians, James reintroduced bishops into the Church of Scotland against the wishes of the presbyterian party.

In 1625, James was succeeded by his son Charles I, who in 1633, some years after his coronation at Westminster, was crowned in St Giles' Cathedral, Edinburgh, with full Anglican rites. Opposition to his attempts to enforce Anglican practices reached a flashpoint when he tried to introduce a Book of Common Prayer. Charles's confrontation with the Scots came to a head in 1639, when he tried and failed to coerce Scotland by military means. In some respects, this revolt also represented Scottish resentment at being sidelined within the Stuart monarchy after James I's accession to the throne of England. It led to the Bishops' Wars.

Charles I's accession also marked the beginning of an intense schism between King and Parliament. Charles's adherence to the doctrine of the divine right of kings, a doctrine foreign to the English mentality he had inherited from his father, fuelled a vicious battle for supremacy between King and Parliament. Therefore, when Charles approached the Parliament to pay for a campaign against the Scots, they refused, declared themselves to be permanently in session and put forward a long list of civil and religious grievances that Charles would have to remedy before they approved any new legislation. Meanwhile, in the Kingdom of Ireland, Charles I's Lord Deputy there, Thomas Wentworth, had antagonised the native Irish Catholics by repeated initiatives to confiscate their lands and grant them to English colonists. He had also angered them by enforcing new taxes but denying Roman Catholics full rights as subjects. What made this situation explosive was his idea, in 1639, to offer Irish Catholics the reforms they had been looking for in return for them raising and paying for an Irish army to put down the Scottish rebellion. Although the army was to be officered by Protestants, the idea of an Irish Catholic army being used to enforce what was seen by many as tyrannical government horrified both the Scottish and the English Parliament, who in response threatened to invade Ireland.

Alienated by British Protestant domination and frightened by the rhetoric of the English and Scottish Parliaments, a small group of Irish conspirators launched the Irish Rebellion of 1641, ostensibly in support of the "King's Rights". The rising was marked by widespread assaults on the British Protestant communities in Ireland, sometimes culminating in massacres. Rumours spread in England and Scotland that the killings had the King's sanction and that this was a foretaste of what was in store for them if the King's Irish troops landed in Britain. As a result, the English Parliament refused to pay for a royal army to put down the rebellion in Ireland and instead raised its own armed forces. The King did likewise, rallying those Royalists (some of them members of Parliament) who believed that loyalty to the legitimate King was the most important political principle.

The English Civil War broke out in 1642. The Scottish Covenanters, as the Presbyterians called themselves, sided with the English Parliament, joined the war in 1643, and played a major role in the English Parliamentary victory. The King's forces were ground down by the efficiency of Parliament's New Model Army – backed by the financial muscle of the City of London. In 1646, Charles I surrendered. After failing to come to compromise with Parliament, he was arrested and executed in 1649. In Ireland, the rebel Irish Catholics formed their own government – Confederate Ireland with the intention of helping the Royalists in return for religious toleration and political autonomy. Troops from England and Scotland fought in Ireland, and Irish Confederate troops mounted an expedition to Scotland in 1644, sparking the Scottish Civil War. In Scotland, the Royalists had a series of victories in 1644–45 but were crushed with the end of the first English Civil War and the return of the main Covenanter armies to Scotland.

Following the end of the second English Civil War, the victorious Parliamentary forces, now commanded by Oliver Cromwell, invaded Ireland and crushed the Royalist-Confederate alliance there in the Cromwellian conquest of Ireland in 1649. Their alliance with the Scottish Covenanters had also broken down, and the Scots crowned Charles II as king. Cromwell therefore embarked on a conquest of Scotland in 1650–51. By the end of the wars, the Three Kingdoms were a unitary state called the English Commonwealth, ostensibly a republic but having many characteristics of a military dictatorship.

While the Wars of the Three Kingdoms pre-figured many of the changes that would shape modern Britain, in the short term it resolved little. The English Commonwealth did achieve a compromise (though a relatively unstable one) between a monarchy and a republic. In practise power was exercised by Oliver Cromwell because of his control over the Parliament's military forces, but his legal position was never clarified, even when he became Lord Protector. While several constitutions were proposed, none were ever accepted. Thus the Commonwealth and the Protectorate established by the victorious Parliamentarians left little behind it in the way of new forms of government. There were two important legacies from this period: the first was that in executing King Charles I for high treason, no future British monarch could be under any illusion that perceived despotism would be tolerated, and the second was that the excesses of Army rule, particularly that of the Major-Generals, has left an abiding mistrust of military rule in the English speaking world.

Ireland and Scotland were occupied by the New Model Army during the Interregnum. In Ireland, almost all lands belonging to Irish Catholics were confiscated as punishment for the rebellion of 1641; harsh Penal Laws were also passed against this community. Thousands of Parliamentarian soldiers were settled in Ireland on confiscated lands. The Parliaments of Ireland and Scotland were abolished. In theory, they were represented in the English Parliament, but since this body was never given real powers, this was insignificant. When Cromwell died in 1658, the Commonwealth fell apart without major violence, and Charles II was restored as King of England, Scotland, and Ireland.

Under the English Restoration, the political system returned to the constitutional position of before the wars: Scotland and Ireland were returned their Parliaments.

When Charles II died his Catholic brother James inherited the throne as James II of England and VII of Scotland. When he had a son, the Parliament of England decided to depose him in the Glorious Revolution of 1688. He was replaced not by his Roman Catholic son, James Stuart, but by his Protestant daughter and son-in-law, Mary II and William III, who became joint rulers in 1689. James made one serious attempt to recover his crowns, which ended with defeat at the Battle of the Boyne in 1690.

== Formation of the Union ==
=== Acts of Union 1707 ===
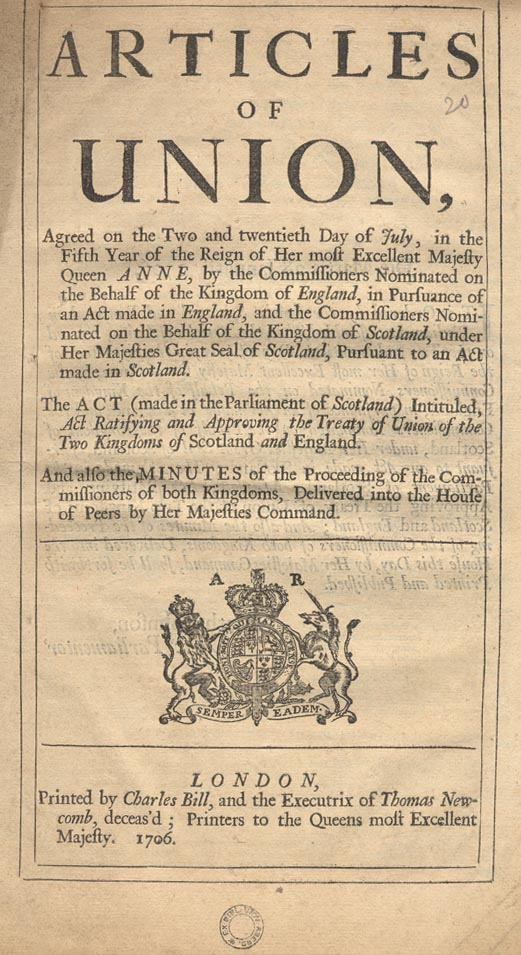
A published version of the Articles of Union, 1707

Deeper political integration was a key policy of Queen Anne (1702–14), who succeeded to the throne in 1702 as the last Stuart monarch of England and Scotland (she was also the only Stuart monarch of Great Britain). The Queen appointed Commissioners for the union on the part of Scotland and England respectively, and in 1706 they began negotiations in earnest, with agreement reached on the terms of a Treaty of Union on 22 July 1706. The circumstances of Scotland's acceptance of the Bill are to some degree disputed. Scottish proponents believed that failure to accede to the Bill would result in the imposition of Union under less favourable terms, and the Lord Justice Clerk, James Johnstone later observed that "As for giving up the legislative power, we had none to give up... for the true state of the matter was whether Scotland should be subject to an English ministry without the privilege of trade or be subject to an English Parliament with trade." Months of fierce debate on both sides of the border were to follow, particularly in Scotland where debate could often dissolve into civil disorder, most notably by the notorious "Edinburgh Mob". The prospect of a union of the kingdoms was deeply unpopular among the Scottish population at large; however, following the financially disastrous Darien scheme, the near-bankrupt Parliament of Scotland did accept the proposals.

In 1707, the Acts of Union received their Royal assent, thereby abolishing the Kingdom of England and the Kingdom of Scotland and their respective parliaments to create a unified Kingdom of Great Britain with a single Parliament of Great Britain. Anne formally became the first occupant of the unified British throne, and Scotland sent 45 MPs to the new parliament at Westminster. Perhaps the greatest single benefit to Scotland of the Union was that she could enjoy free trade with England and her possessions overseas. For England's part, a possible ally for European states hostile to England had been neutralised while simultaneously securing a Protestant succession to the new British throne.

However, certain aspects of the former independent kingdoms remained separate. Examples of Scottish and English institutions that were not merged into the British system include Scottish and English law, Scottish and English banking systems, the Presbyterian Church of Scotland and the Anglican Church of England and the systems of education and higher learning. These remain separate.

=== Acts of Union 1800 ===

Following the Irish Rebellion of 1641, Irish Catholics were barred from voting or attending the Irish Parliament. The new English Protestant ruling class was known as the Protestant Ascendancy. Towards the end of the 18th century the entirely Protestant Irish Parliament attained a greater degree of independence from the British Parliament than it had previously held. Under the Penal Laws no Irish Catholic could sit in the Parliament of Ireland, even though some 90% of Ireland's population was native Irish Catholic when the first of these bans was introduced in 1691. This ban was followed by others in 1703 and 1709 as part of a comprehensive system disadvantaging the Catholic community and to a lesser extent Protestant dissenters. In 1798, many members of this dissenter tradition made common cause with Catholics in a rebellion inspired and led by the Society of United Irishmen. It was staged with the aim of creating a fully independent Ireland as a state with a republican constitution. Despite assistance from France, the Irish Rebellion of 1798 was put down by British forces.

The legislative union of Great Britain and Ireland was completed by the Acts of Union 1800 passed by each parliament, uniting the two kingdoms into one, called "The United Kingdom of Great Britain and Ireland". The twin Acts were passed in the Parliament of Great Britain and the Parliament of Ireland with substantial majorities achieved in Ireland in part (according to contemporary documents) through bribery, namely the awarding of peerages and honours to critics to get their votes.

Under the terms of the union, there was to be but one Parliament of the United Kingdom. Ireland sent four lords spiritual (bishops) and twenty-eight lords temporal to the House of Lords and one hundred members to the House of Commons at Westminster. The lords spiritual were chosen by rotation, and the lords temporal were elected from among the peers of Ireland.

Part of the arrangement as a trade-off for Irish Catholics was to be the granting of Catholic emancipation, which had been fiercely resisted by the all-Anglican Irish Parliament. However, this was blocked by King George III, who argued that emancipating Roman Catholics would breach his Coronation Oath. The Roman Catholic hierarchy had endorsed the Union. However, the decision to block Catholic Emancipation fatally undermined its appeal.

=== Table of historic merging of territories within the UK ===
Date	Statute/Act etc.	Territories included	Name	Notes	Not included
Pre-1284	–	–	–	–	Separate countries in/of England / Ireland / Scotland / Wales
1284	Statute of Rhuddlan	England & Wales	England	Principality of Wales annexed to the Crown of England	Kingdom of Scotland / Lordship of Ireland since 1171
1536	Laws in Wales Acts 1535 and 1542	England & Wales	Kingdom of England	Wales fully incorporated into the Kingdom of England	Kingdom of Scotland / Lordship of Ireland, shortly to become Kingdom of Ireland in Crown of Ireland Act 1542
1603	Union of the Crowns	England, Scotland & Wales (under a common king)	Great Britain	James VI and I titled "King of Great Brittaine, France, and Ireland" although he did not actually rule France; Ireland effectively a subject nation	Kingdom of Ireland (Since 1541/42)
1707	Acts of Union 1707	England, Scotland & Wales (merging of parliaments)	Kingdom of Great Britain	See Monarchy of Scotland -personal union between the Crown of Scotland and the British Crown becomes a political union	Kingdom of Ireland
1801	Acts of Union 1800	England, Ireland, Scotland & Wales	United Kingdom of Great Britain & Ireland	Parliament of Ireland approved political union of monarchies of Ireland and Great Britain	–
1921	Anglo-Irish Treaty	England, Northern Ireland, Scotland & Wales	United Kingdom of Great Britain & Northern Ireland	establishment of the Irish Free State	Irish Free State, later Republic of Ireland or Éire (see Names of the Irish state)

See also Documents relevant to personal and legislative unions of the countries of the United Kingdom, and History of the formation of the United Kingdom (Background).

== Partition of Ireland, and Irish independence ==
=== Irish alienation and independence ===
The 19th century saw the Great Famine of the 1840s, during which one million Irish people died and over a million emigrated. Aspects of the United Kingdom met with popularity in Ireland during the 122-year union. Hundreds of thousands flocked to Dublin for the visits of Queen Victoria in 1900, Edward VII and Queen Alexandra in 1903 and 1907, and George V and Queen Mary in 1911. About 210,000 Irishmen fought for the United Kingdom in World War I, at a time when Ireland was the only home nation where conscription was not in force.

The 19th century and early 20th century saw the rise of Irish nationalism, especially among the Catholic population. From the general election of 1874 until the creation of the Irish Free State in 1922, the majority of MPs elected from Irish constituencies supported home rule, sometimes finding themselves holding the balance of power in the House of Commons. Frustrated by lack of political progress, an armed rebellion took place with the Easter Rising of 1916. Two years later, the more radical, republican party, Sinn Féin, won 73 of the 103 Irish constituencies. Sinn Féin had promised not to sit in the UK Parliament but rather to set up an Irish Parliament, known as the First Dáil, which declared Irish independence by reaffirming the 1916 declaration, leading to the subsequent Irish War of Independence. In 1921, a treaty was concluded between the British Government and a delegation of Irish leaders. Under the treaty, Northern Ireland would form a home rule state within the new Irish Free State unless it opted out. Northern Ireland had a majority Protestant population and opted out as expected. A Boundary Commission was set up to decide on the border between the two Irish states, though it was subsequently abandoned after it recommended only minor adjustments to the border.

The Irish Free State was initially a British dominion like Canada and South Africa with George V as its head of state. Along with the other dominions, it received full legislative autonomy under the Statute of Westminster 1931. Renamed Ireland in 1937, it declared itself a republic in 1949 and thereby ceased to be regarded as in the British Commonwealth having no constitutional ties to the United Kingdom.

The "United Kingdom of Great Britain and Ireland" continued in name until 1927 when it was renamed the "United Kingdom of Great Britain and Northern Ireland" by the Royal and Parliamentary Titles Act 1927 (although, strictly speaking, the Act only referred to the King's title and the name of Parliament). In 1948 a working party chaired by the Cabinet Secretary recommended that the country's name be changed to the "United Kingdom of Great Britain and Ulster". However, the prime minister did not favour the change and it was not made.

Despite increasing political independence from each other from 1922, and complete political independence since 1949, the union left the two countries intertwined with each other in many respects. Ireland used the Irish pound from 1928 until 2001 when it was replaced by the Euro. Until it joined the ERM in 1979, the Irish pound was directly linked to the Pound sterling. Decimalisation of both currencies occurred simultaneously on Decimal Day in 1971. Irish Citizens in the UK have a status almost equivalent to British Citizens. They can vote in all elections and even stand for parliament. British Citizens have similar rights to Irish Citizens in the Republic of Ireland and can vote in all elections apart from presidential elections and referendums. People from Northern Ireland can have a right to Irish citizenship. (Note: Notwithstanding any other provision of this Constitution, a person born in the island of Ireland, which includes its islands and seas, who does not have, at the time of the birth of that person, at least one parent who is an Irish citizen or entitled to be an Irish citizen is not entitled to Irish citizenship or nationality, unless provided for by law. This section shall not apply to persons born before the date of the enactment of this section — 27th Amendment to the Constitution of Ireland; Article 9 (Section 2, 1°))

Northern Ireland remains part of the United Kingdom. Since 1922, it has sometimes enjoyed self-government, and at other times has been ruled directly from Westminster. However, even while governing itself, it has always kept its representation in the United Kingdom Parliament, and has formed part of the country which, since 1927, has included "Northern Ireland" in its name.

== Rise in separatism ==
=== First pro-independence representatives in Scotland and Wales ===
In 1969, the Royal Commission on the Constitution was set up by Prime Minister Harold Wilson to examine the constitutional and economic relationships between various parts of the United Kingdom. It was launched following the success of the pro-independence parties, the Scottish National Party and Plaid Cymru, in by-elections between 1966 (Carmarthen) and 1967 (Hamilton). After the October 1974 United Kingdom general election Wilson's successor James Callaghan's Labour Government had only a majority of three, and by 1977 lost its majority from by-elections, therefore becoming vulnerable to demands from pro-independence parties. The commission recommended the establishment of elected bodies for Scotland and Wales. Referendums in Scotland and Wales were held in 1979; the Scottish result was a narrow 52% win, but did not meet the '40% Rule', which demanded at least 40% of eligible voters (on the electoral roll) to participate, and the Welsh result was an 80% rejection.

=== Modern devolution ===
Central and devolved legislatures
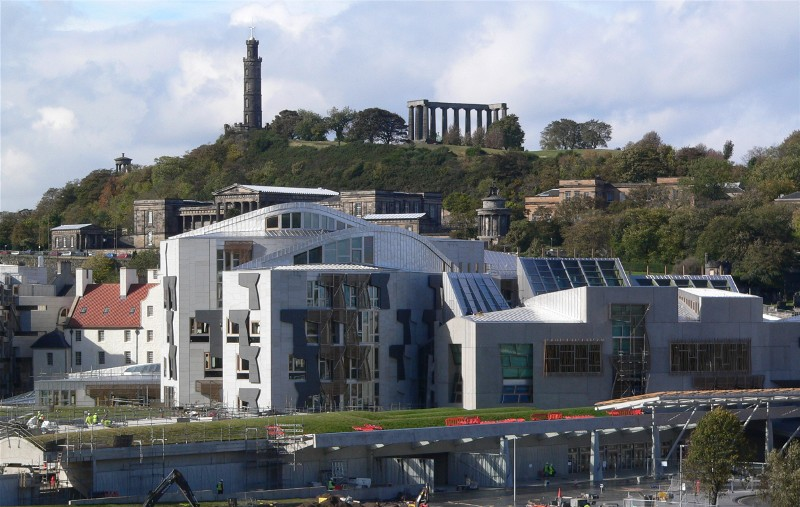
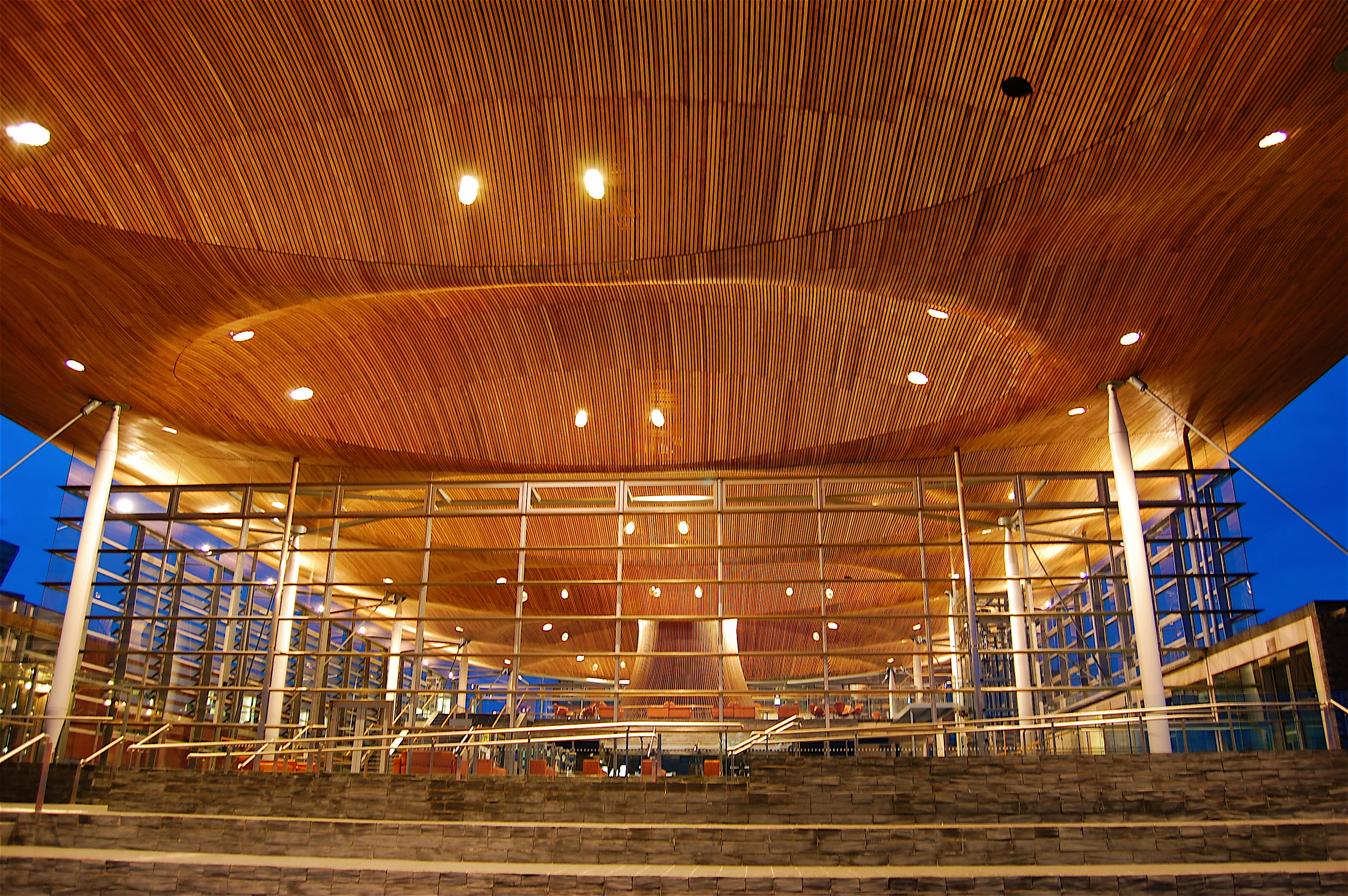
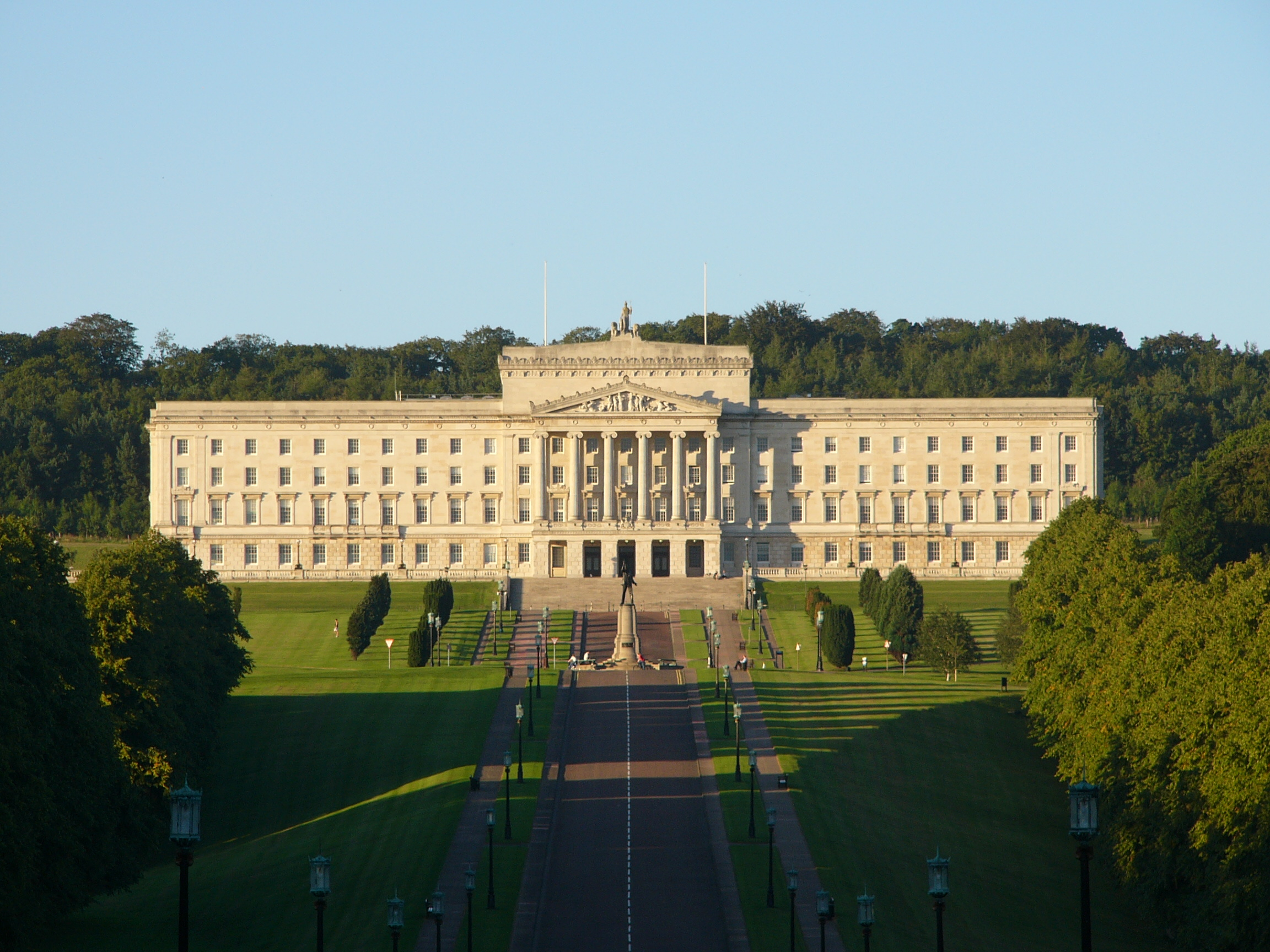
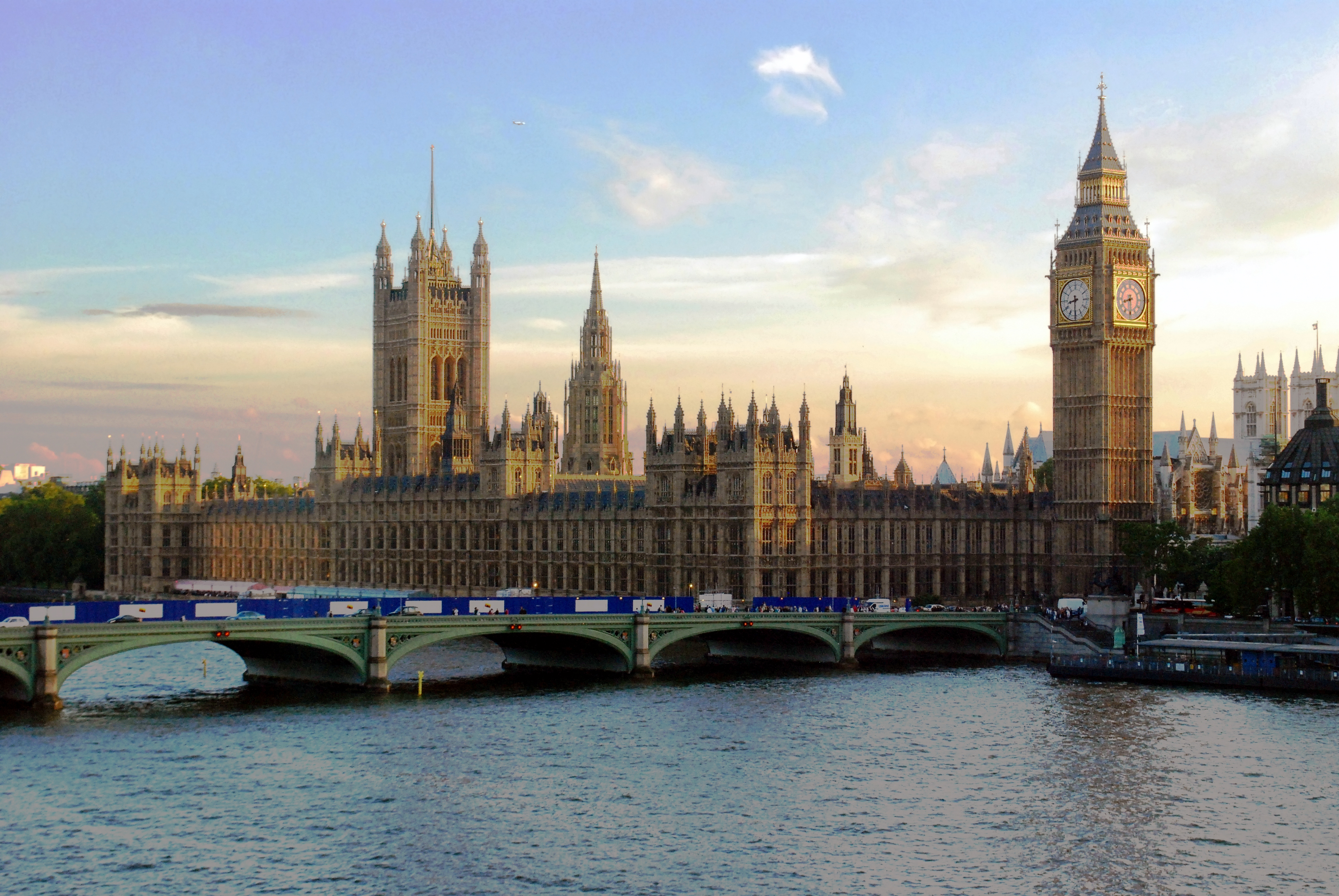
Clockwise, top-left, Scottish Parliament Building (Scotland), Senedd building (Wales), Palace of Westminster (UK), Stormont Buildings (Northern Ireland)

Devolution was re-introduced as part of the manifesto of the UK Labour Party which won power under Tony Blair in the 1997 United Kingdom general election. On 11 September 1997, the Scottish devolution referendum was put to the Scottish electorate and secured a majority (74.3%) in favour of the establishment of a new devolved Scottish Parliament, with tax-varying powers, in Edinburgh. A few days later on 18 September 1997, Wales held a similar referendum, with a narrow majority (50.3%) voting in favour of an assembly, which unlike the Scottish body, did not have primary legislative power at the time. On 22 May 1998, Northern Ireland voted in a referendum on whether to approve the Good Friday Agreement, which ended the Troubles and made provisions for the establishment of a Northern Ireland Assembly. It passed with 71% of the vote.

The first election to the assembly in Northern Ireland was held on 25 June 1998, whereas for the devolved bodies in Scotland and Wales, the first elections were held on 6 May 1999. Devolved powers in Northern Ireland were suspended between October 2002 and 8 May 2007.

Each devolved body has the authority to legislate in a field of competences known as "transferred matters" or "devolved matters". These matters include any competence not explicitly retained by the Parliament at Westminster. Powers reserved by Westminster are divided into "excepted matters", which it retains indefinitely, and "reserved matters", which may be transferred to the competence of the devolved bodies at a future date.

The Northern Ireland Assembly's composition and powers are laid down in the Northern Ireland Act 1998. The Assembly has both legislative powers and responsibility for electing the Northern Ireland Executive. The Government of Wales Act 1998 granted the formation of the National Assembly for Wales and granted it a significant number of new powers which included most of the powers previously held by the Secretary of State for Wales. The Scotland Act 1998, determined the powers and responsibilities of the Scottish Parliament. On 1 July 1999, the powers were transferred to the bodies in Scotland and Wales.

A 2011 referendum in Wales was held, with 63.5% of voters, on 35.4% turnout, voted in favour of awarding primary legislation powers to the Welsh Assembly. The Assembly was renamed "Senedd Cymru" or "the Welsh Parliament" ("Senedd") in 2020, to reflect its increased legislative powers.

=== 21st century ===
==== Rise of the Scottish National Party and Scottish independence referendum ====
Results of the 2014 Scottish independence referendum by Council area

Following the gradual decline and eventual collapse of Scottish Labour since the 2007 Scottish Parliament election, the pro-independence party, the Scottish National Party (SNP) has been gaining support. It won 28.7% of the vote in the very first Scottish Parliament election in 1999. In 2007, the SNP became the largest political party for the first time, winning one more seat than second placed Labour with 32.9% of the vote. The SNP won 45.4% at the 2011 Scottish Parliament election with a peak of 69 Members of the Scottish Parliament (MSP). Although winning fewer seats in the 2016 Scottish Parliament election under the new leadership of Nicola Sturgeon, the SNP percentage vote actually increased to 46.5%, and then increased again to 47.7% in the 2021 Scottish Parliament election with 64 MSP seats.

In Westminster elections, Scottish Labour declined to a single seat, a decrease of forty, in the 2015 United Kingdom general election in Scotland. With 56 of the 59 UK Parliament seats in Scotland going to the SNP.

In 2014, a majority of 55% of Scottish voters voted to remain part of the UK in an independence referendum, with 45% voting for Scottish independence.

==== Recent history ====
There were renewed calls for a Scottish independence referendum after the UK as a whole voted to leave the European Union in the 2016 Brexit referendum. Scotland on the other hand voted to remain in the EU by 62% to 38%.

The differing opinions of the four countries relating to Brexit is given as a reason for Scotland and Northern Ireland leaving the UK, in both of which a majority voted to remain in the European Union. The UK as a whole voted by 52% to leave, as did England and Wales. On the other hand, Scotland had voted 62% remain, and Northern Ireland 56% remain. Many leave supporters in England supported Scotland and Northern Ireland leaving the UK in order to secure Brexit. Some academics have described the European Union to have helped maintain the UK's constitutional arrangement.

In December 2018, an opinion poll showed in the event of a No-deal Brexit, a majority of those polled in Northern Ireland would vote to reunify with Ireland. Following the Brexit negotiations, the Northern Ireland Protocol created a de facto customs "Irish Sea border" for goods from (but not to) Great Britain going to Northern Ireland, to the disquiet of prominent Unionists.

At the 2022 Northern Ireland Assembly election, Nationalists won 35 of the 90 seats, with Sinn Féin being the largest party. Some claimed the nationalist-win would lead to the collapse of the UK, although critics cite unionist MLAs outnumber nationalists. UK ministers rejected Unionist claims that a Sinn Féin-held First Minister in Northern Ireland would lead to a United Ireland.

Following the outbreak of the COVID-19 pandemic in the United Kingdom, polls for Scottish independence recorded a sustained period of support over 50% for Scottish independence over remaining in the United Kingdom, in some cases reversing the 2014 "no" vote. In the 2024 United Kingdom general election in Scotland, Labour had increased back to 37 of Scotland's 57 seats, with the SNP having 9.

=== Separatist movements ===
==== Prospect of Scottish independence ====
In 2014, 55% of Scottish voters rejected leaving the UK in an independence referendum. However, after the 2016 European Union membership referendum, in which Scotland, as well as Northern Ireland, voted to remain in the EU while England and Wales voted to leave, there is the prospect of a second Scottish independence referendum. With some polls on support for Scottish independence being in the majority in 2020, however, polls have a margin of error and many do not include 16-17-year-olds like in the 2014 referendum.

==== Prospect of Welsh independence ====
Wales voted to leave in the EU referendum. However, historically the support for Welsh independence has predominantly been low, ranging between 10% in 2013 and 24% in 2019. Since the outbreak of the COVID-19 pandemic in 2020, however, popular support has risen. One poll in March 2021 showed that, with "don't knows" removed, nearly 40% of Welsh people were in favour of independence.

==== Prospect of Irish reunification ====
In 1973, Northern Ireland had a referendum on Irish reunification, though the result was in favour of the United Kingdom and the poll was boycotted by Nationalists. The 1998 Northern Ireland Good Friday Agreement referendum was then held to approve the Good Friday Agreement, which among other things, included a clause which states that a border poll on Irish reunification must be held if public opinion is shown to have changed in favour of a United Ireland.

== See also ==
- Constitution of the United Kingdom
- History of the constitution of the United Kingdom
