= William Hardy (archivist) =

English archivist and antiquarian (1807–1887)

Sir William Hardy (1807–1887) was an English archivist and antiquarian.

== Life ==
A younger brother of Thomas Duffus Hardy, he was born in Jamaica on 6 July 1807 and came to England at the same time as his brother, in 1811. He was educated at Fotheringhay and later at Boulogne.

In February 1823, he obtained an appointment at the Tower of London, under Samuel Lysons, similar to the one his brother had obtained in 1819: Lysons was their uncle. Seven years later he was offered and accepted the post of keeper of the records of the Duchy of Lancaster. In 1839 he was elected a fellow of the Society of Antiquaries. He had also a private practice in antiquarian, legal, and genealogical inquiries, and made a reputation: he was consulted in numerous disputes on foreshore fishery and common rights, and was well known for applications made to the House of Lords for the restoration of peerages in abeyance.

While at the Duchy of Lancaster he worked on arranging the muniments. In 1868 Queen Victoria decided to present the duchy records to the nation, and incorporate them with the public archives. Hardy was then transferred to the Public Record Office and appointed an assistant-keeper in there. In 1878, on the death of his brother, Sir George Jessel offered him the post of deputy-keeper, which he held for eight years. He resigned, in poor health, on 27 January 1886.

Hardy was placed on the Historical Manuscripts Commission on 12 July 1878, and knighted at Osborne House on 31 December 1883. He died on 17 March 1887.

== Works ==
Results of his work appeared in the reports of the Public Record Office. Besides the calendars to the Duchy of Lancaster records, he compiled, in 1845, Charters of Duchy of Lancaster, with the major documents on the formation of the Duchy and historical introduction. During his time of office as deputy-keeper he drew up a scheme for reorganising the department, which was carried into effect. He was also instrumental in starting the Commission for the destruction of valueless documents.

He edited for the Rolls Series the first volumes of the Recueil des Croniques et Anchiennes Istories de la Grant Bretaigne a present nomme Engleterre, by Jehan de Waurin.

== Family ==
In 1840 he married at Lewisham Church, Kent, Eliza Caroline Seymour Lee, daughter of Captain J. E. Lee, by whom he left two sons, the younger being William John Hardy, father of William Le Hardy, making three generations of archivists.
