= Types of subdivision of the United Kingdom =

The United Kingdom and its four constituent countries has a long history of complex administrative geography. Due to the ruling of the country by different ruling classes over the centuries, different parts of the country have different traditional and modern systems of territorial organisation. This article lists different subdivisions found historically and modernly in the different countries of the UK.

== County and shire ==
The term 'county' is very unclear in modern Britain, due to a number of different uses of term for the same areas, but with different boundaries for each. In England, counties have been the established unit of local government since the Middle Ages.

=== Administrative ===
Up until the 1970s, the primary unit of administration in Great Britain was counties, governed by county councils. In Scotland, there were 37 counties, greatly ranging in size. Four of these - Edinburgh, Glasgow, Aberdeen and Dundee - were counties of cities. In England, these were known as administrative counties, which are fairly congruous with the current historic counties, with a few exemptions. In 1963, Greater London was established, taking London out of any administrative county.

=== Home ===
'Home county' is a term specifically reserved for counties surrounding London.

=== Historic ===
Today in England, the pre-1974 county boundaries survive in the form of historic counties, also known as traditional counties. This could refer to the counties at any point from the Domesday Book to 1974, as the boundaries often changed in between then. In medieval times, counties were administered by a sheriff (meaning shire-reeve). Prior to the Norman invasion, counties were known as shires, but the Normans renamed the shire to county (the area under the control of a count).

=== Lieutenancy ===
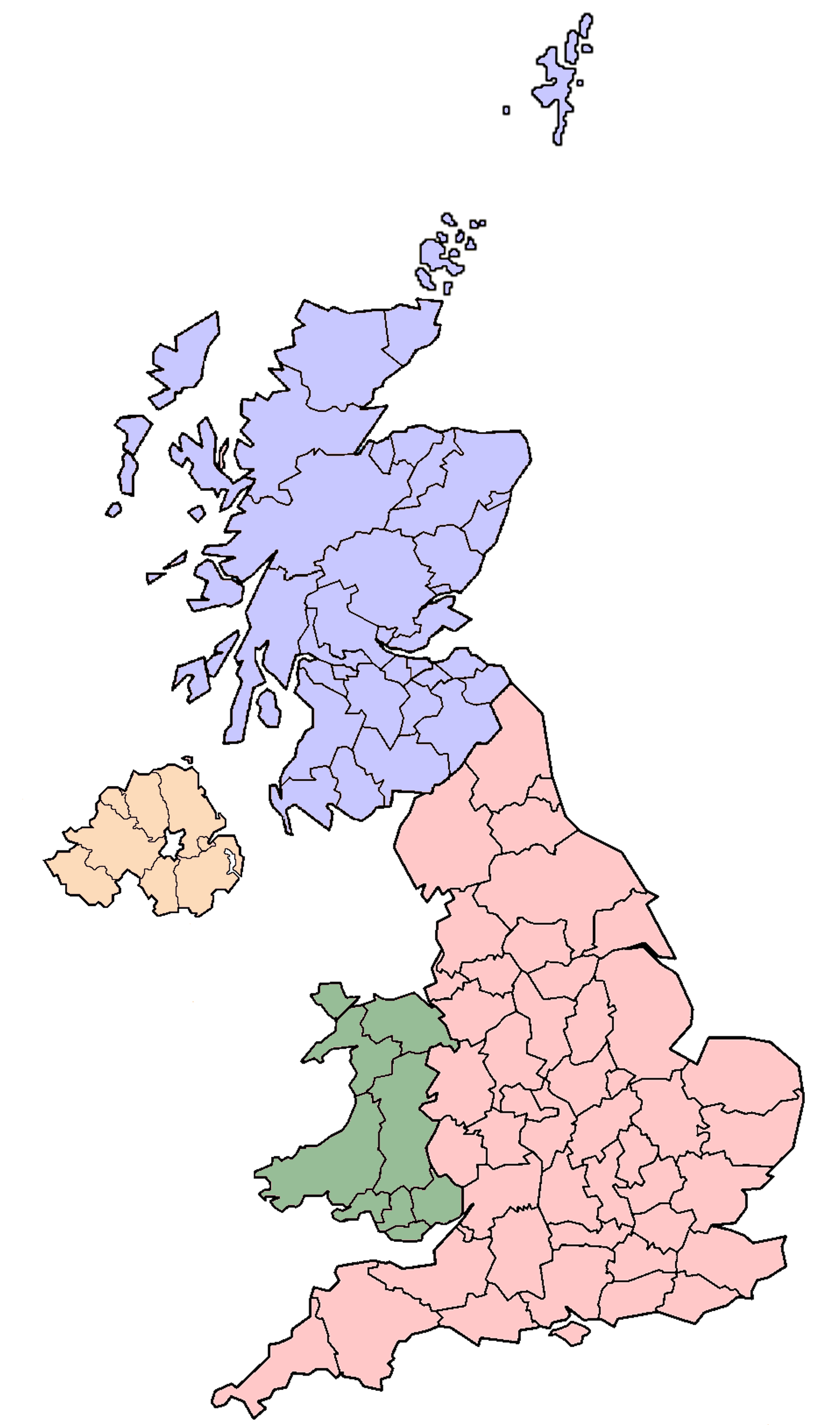
This map shows Lieutenancy areas, the separate areas of the United Kingdom appointed a Lord Lieutenant. Ceremonial counties of England Lieutenancy areas of Northern Ireland Lieutenancy areas of Scotland Preserved counties of Wales

Across Great Britain, lord lieutenants are appointed by the Crown to act as the King's representative within a lieutenancy area in the UK.

Since the Lieutenancies Act 1997 in England, lord lieutenants have been appointed to the ceremonial counties. There are 48 ceremonial counties, which includes parts of traditional counties (e.g. North Yorkshire, West Yorkshire) and fairly modern counties such as Merseyside and Cumbria, while some traditional counties such as Huntingdonshire are not a ceremonial county.

=== Postal ===
Until 1996, addresses in the United Kingdom needed to include a county name, in order to differentiate different towns with the same name. From 1974 in England and Wales, these broadly matched the 1974 county boundaries, with some notable exceptions. most notably, Middlesex continued to exist, covering parts of Greater London, as Greater London was not a recognised postal county. Some post towns were not within a postal county, particularly the county town of the county. Since the introduction of postcodes, counties are no longer officially used in addresses.

=== Registration ===
Registration counties used to be used for the registration of births, deaths and marriages and for the conduct of censuses. They are still used in Scotland for land registration.

== Sub-county ==
=== Burgh ===
Prior to 1975, counties in Scotland could contain burghs. A burgh is a municipal corporation which has a high degree of autonomy from other local government structures. The head of a burgh is a provost, similar to a mayor in England. Some burghs of Scotland have been given special royal status, making them a royal burgh. Burghs also existed in the North of England.

=== County borough ===
Since 1889, county boroughs (or county of city in Scotland) have existed in both Great Britain and Ireland. In 1889, when county councils were introduced in England and Wales, large towns and cities were exempted and able to become a county borough. In England, though county boroughs are now abolished, the current status of metropolitan boroughs and unitary authorities have been compared to county boroughs. In Wales, county boroughs were revived in the 1990s, when certain principal areas were designated as county boroughs, though county boroughs have the same powers as administrative counties. In Scotland, county boroughs never existed, though certain burghs were designated as counties of cities (e.g. County of Glasgow) and had powers similar to a county level.

=== Lathe ===
Kent is traditionally divided into lathes for administrative purposes. In the thirteenth century, the lathes of Kent were St Augustine, Shepway, Scray, Aylesford and Sutton-at-Home.

=== Parts ===
Lincolnshire is traditionally divided into three parts (note that 'parts' is both the plural and singular), similar in nature to the three ridings of Yorkshire. The three parts are Lindsey, Kesteven and Holland. Lindsey's administrative centre was Newland in Lincoln and was further split into three ridings. The current districts of Lincolnshire are mostly named for the old parts.

=== Rape ===
A rape is the traditional sub-division in the county of Sussex. Traditionally, Sussex is divided into six rapes: Chichester, Arundel, Bramber, Lewes, Pevensey and Hastings. Each rape is organised around its namesake rapal town, in which is located its Norman castle (or caput).

=== Ridings ===
Ridings were used as county subdivisions in Yorkshire and parts subdivisions in Lindsey, Lincolnshire.

In Yorkshire, there were three ridings: North, West and East. Furthermore, the City of York was not within any riding to emphasise its impartiality. The term riding lives on within the title of a ceremonial county of England: the East Riding of Yorkshire, though this was only created in 1996.
