= Eyre & Spottiswoode =

Defunct London-based printing firm

- Status: Defunct
- Founded: 1739
- Founder: George Edward Eyre; Andrew Spottiswoode
- Defunct: 1970s
- Successor: Methuen Publishing
- Country of origin: United Kingdom
- Headquarters location: London
- Publication types: Books

Eyre & Spottiswoode was the London-based printing firm established in 1739 that was the King's Printer, and subsequently, a publisher prior to being incorporated; it once went by the name of Spottiswoode, Ballantyne & co. ltd. In April 1929, it was incorporated as Eyre & Spottiswoode (Publishers) Ltd. It became part of Associated Book Publishers in 1958 and merged with Methuen in the 1970s with the resulting company known as Eyre Methuen.

== History ==
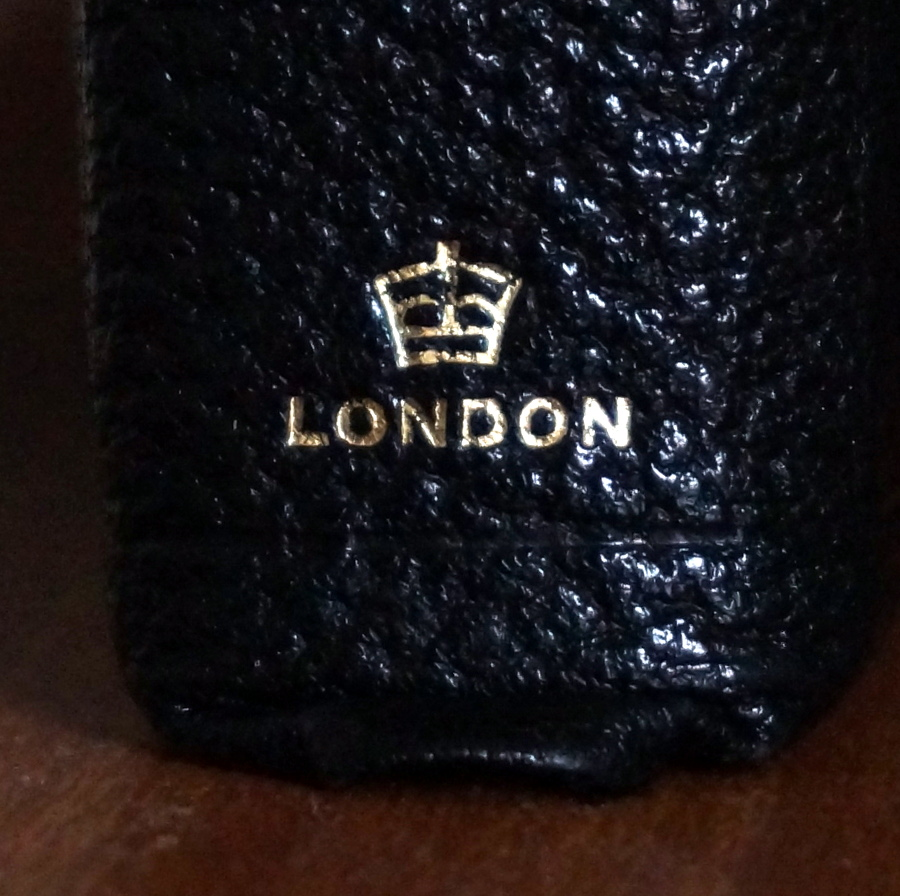
The crest of the King's Printer, London, on the spine of a King James Version bible published by Eyre & Spottiswoode.

The business that became Eyre & Spottiswoode was founded by William Strahan in 1739. His son Andrew inherited the business upon William's death in 1785. Brothers Robert and Andrew Spottiswoode took over management for their uncle Andrew Stahan in 1819 and continued until 1832. In the 19th century, the firm had a printing works at Shacklewell. The firm was re-appointed King's Printer after the accession of King Edward VII in May 1901.

Douglas Jerrold became a director in 1929, when it incorporated as a publishing house, became chairman in 1945, and retired in 1958. Between 1944 and 1948, Graham Greene was his director, in charge of developing its fiction list. Greene created The Century Library series, which was discontinued after he left following a conflict with Jerrold regarding Anthony Powell's contract. In 1958, Greene was offered the position of chairman by Oliver Crosthwaite-Eyre, but declined.

== "The Printers' Battalion" ==
The 2nd City of London Rifle Volunteer Corps was founded in 1860 as one of many such regiments raised in response to an invasion scare. Recruited in the Fleet Street area, largely from Eyre & Spottiswoode's printing works, it was known as "the Printers' Battalion". Among the first officers to be commissioned into the unit were George A. Spottiswoode and William Spottiswoode. When the unit became the 6th Battalion London Regiment (City of London Rifles) in the new Territorial Force in 1908, G Company was still mainly recruited from the company's employees.

== The Protocols of the Elders of Zion ==
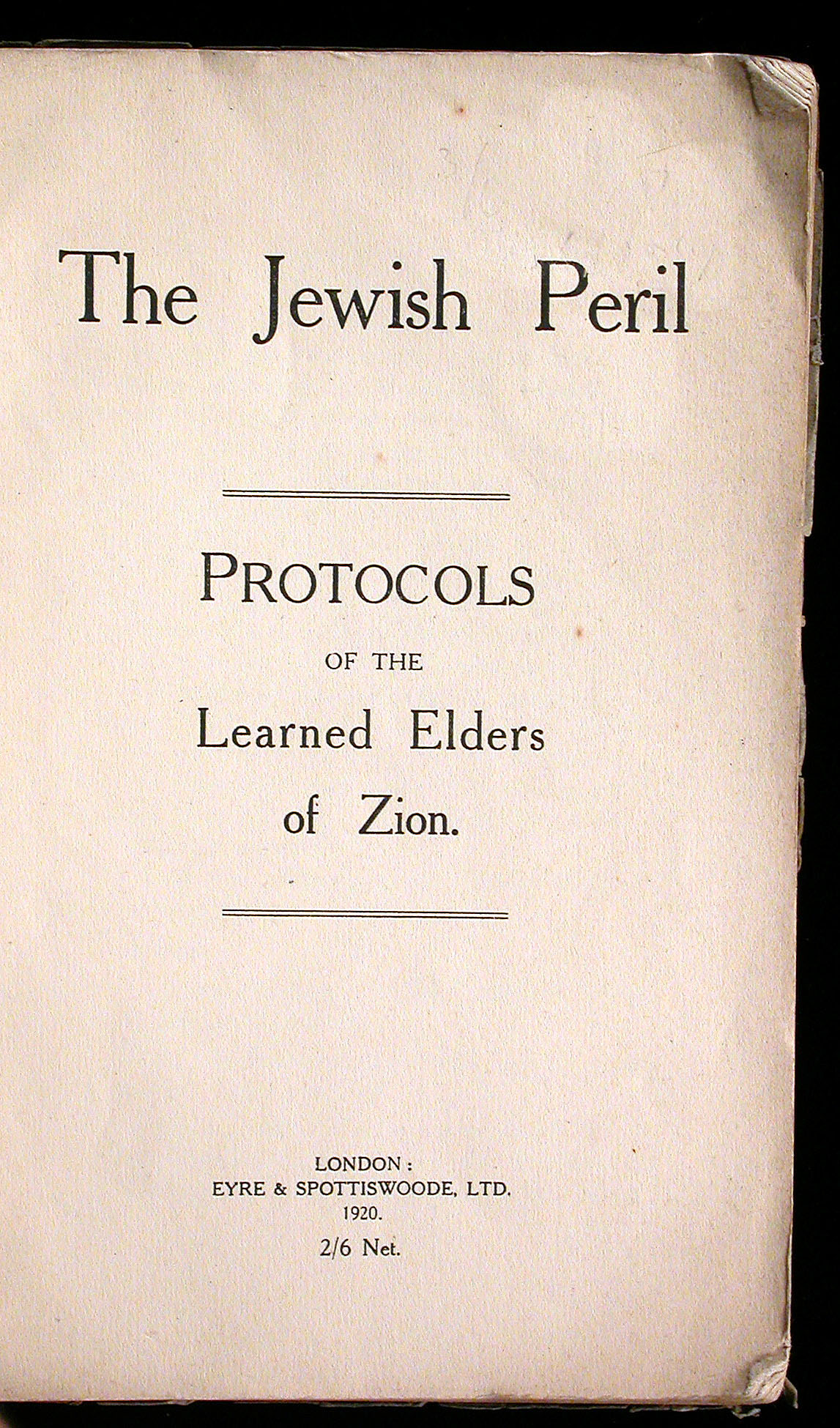
Title page of the 1920 first British & English-language edition of the Protocols

In 1920, the firm was the first in the United Kingdom to print a translation of the notorious antisemitic text The Protocols of the Elders of Zion, with the additional title The Jewish Peril. Norman Cohn said that a distinction is to be made between the printer and the publisher of the same name. The pamphlet, shows it was printed by "EYRE & SPOTTISWOODE, LTD.". It seems that this edition of the Protocols was printed to private commission and therefore bears the imprint of the printers, Eyre & Spottiswoode Ltd, instead of a publisher's imprint. The firm of Eyre & Spottiswoode (Publishers) Ltd was founded in April 1929.

== Book series ==
- The Century Library
- Country Library
- Highways to the Sun
- How to Play Series
- The Kew Series
- Keystone Library
- London Mystery Stories
- Modern Writers and Playwrights
- Popular Fiction
- The Practitioner Handbooks
- The Regions of Britain
