= Marcus Crouch =

Marcus Crouch (12 February 1913 – 24 April 1996) was an English librarian, and an influential commentator on and reviewer of children's books.

== Life and works ==
Marcus Crouch was born at Tottenham in Middlessex and educated at the Grammar School there and at London University, where he trained as a Chartered Librarian at the School of Librarianship, University College.

He worked as a librarian in the Middlesex, Lancashire and Kent County Libraries. He was chairman, and later Honorary Secretary, of the Youth Libraries Group (established) of the Library Association, and Chairman of the Kent Branch of the School Library Association. He was Deputy County Librarian for Kent.

He is best known for two surveys of British children's literature: Treasure Seekers and Borrowers: Children's Books in Britain 1900-1960 and The Nesbit Tradition: The Children's Novel 1945-1970. For the Library Association he compiled an account of those books that were awarded the Carnegie Medal in its first thirty years 1936–1957 in Chosen for Children: an account of the books which have been awarded the Library Association Carnegie Medal, 1936-1965. (Note: Marcus Crouch. Chosen for Children: ..., Second edition, London: Library Association, 1967. • Chosen for Children, ed. 2, in libraries (WorldCat catalog). The first and second editions by Crouch covered the first two and first three decades of Carnegie Medal winners. The third edition by Crouch and Alec Ellis (1977, ISBN 9780853653493) comprises the second, except a new introduction by Ellis, plus coverage of the fourth decade by Ellis.)

He was noted for his Bodley Head monograph on Beatrix Potter.

He compiled and edited several collections of folk tales for children.

He created several nonfiction books on southeastern England including some illustrated with his own photographs.

Crouch contributed numerous reviews of children's books to Junior Bookshelf, the Times Literary Supplement, and School Librarian.

He died at home in North Wales aged 83. He is commemorated by the Kent Arts and Libraries "Marcus Crouch Collection" of approximately 1,500 children's books that were published in the United Kingdom between 1830 and 1930.
