= List of British regions by life expectancy =

According to United Nations' estimates, in 2023 life expectancy in the United Kingdom was 81.30 years (79.36 for male, 83.21 for female). This is 0.14 years less than it was in the pre-COVID 2019.

Estimation of the World Bank Group for 2023: 81.24 years total (79.36 for male, 83.21 for female).

According to estimation of the WHO for 2019, at that year life expectancy in the United Kingdom was 81.22 years (79.50 years for male and 82.92 years for female).
And healthy life expectancy was 69.74 years (69.38 years for male and 70.07 years for female).

Life expectancy in the UK as of 2023 is lower than in neighboring countries (Denmark, Belgium, the Netherlands, Luxembourg, Ireland, Iceland, Sweden, Norway, France).

== Office for National Statistics (2017–2019, 2022–2024) ==
By default the table is sorted by arithmetic mean for 2017–2019 period.

Regions of England

constituent country or region of England	2017–2019				change	2022–2024			
constituent country or region of England	male	female	sex gap	arith. mean	change	male	female	sex gap	arith. mean
London region	80.9	84.7	3.8	82.80	−0.20	80.5	84.7	4.2	82.60
South East England	80.8	84.3	3.5	82.55	0.00	80.7	84.4	3.7	82.55
South West England	80.4	84.1	3.7	82.25	−0.05	80.3	84.1	3.8	82.20
East of England	80.5	83.9	3.4	82.20	−0.05	80.3	84.0	3.7	82.15
England on average	79.8	83.4	3.6	81.60	−0.20	79.5	83.3	3.8	81.40
United Kingdom	79.4	83.1	3.7	81.25	−0.15	79.2	83.0	3.8	81.10
East Midlands	79.5	82.9	3.4	81.20	−0.30	79.0	82.8	3.8	80.90
West Midlands	79.0	82.9	3.9	80.95	−0.20	78.7	82.8	4.1	80.75
Northern Ireland	78.8	82.6	3.8	80.70	0.00	78.8	82.6	3.8	80.70
Yorkshire and the Humber	78.8	82.5	3.7	80.65	−0.35	78.3	82.3	4.0	80.30
Wales	78.5	82.3	3.8	80.40	−0.15	78.3	82.2	3.9	80.25
North West England	78.4	82.1	3.7	80.25	−0.35	77.9	81.9	4.0	79.90
North East England	78.0	81.8	3.8	79.90	−0.25	77.7	81.6	3.9	79.65
Scotland	77.2	81.1	3.9	79.15	0.00	77.2	81.1	3.9	79.15

Data source: Office for National Statistics. Data for the United Kingdom on avarage for 2017–2019 are taken from an adjacent table of the same agency.

== Eurostat (2017, 2018) ==
By default the table is sorted by 2018.

code	region	2017				2017 →2018	2018			
code	region	overall	male	female	F Δ M	2017 →2018	overall	male	female	F Δ M
	UK on average	81.3	79.5	83.1	3.6	0.0	81.3	79.5	83.1	3.6
UKI3	Inner London - West	83.9	82.2	85.6	3.4	0.8	84.7	82.9	86.5	3.6
UKI7	Outer London - West and North West	83.7	82.0	85.4	3.4	−0.3	83.4	81.4	85.3	3.9
UKJ1	Berkshire, Buckinghamshire, and Oxfordshire	82.9	81.1	84.6	3.5	0.3	83.2	81.6	84.7	3.1
UKJ2	Surrey, East and West Sussex	82.8	81.1	84.5	3.4	0.1	82.9	81.2	84.6	3.4
UKI6	Outer London - South	83.1	81.3	84.8	3.5	−0.4	82.7	80.9	84.4	3.5
UKJ3	Hampshire and Isle of Wight	82.3	80.6	84.0	3.4	0.2	82.5	80.8	84.2	3.4
UKK2	Dorset and Somerset	82.6	80.9	84.3	3.4	−0.2	82.4	80.5	84.3	3.8
UKI5	Outer London - East and North East	82.3	80.2	84.3	4.1	0.1	82.4	80.4	84.2	3.8
UKK1	Gloucestershire, Wiltshire and Bristol/Bath area	82.3	80.6	84.0	3.4	0.0	82.3	80.5	84.1	3.6
UKE2	North Yorkshire	82.5	80.8	84.1	3.3	−0.2	82.3	80.5	84.0	3.5
UKH1	East Anglia	82.4	80.6	84.1	3.5	−0.1	82.3	80.4	84.2	3.8
UKH2	Bedfordshire and Hertfordshire	82.5	80.8	84.1	3.3	−0.2	82.3	80.4	84.1	3.7
UKI4	Inner London - East	81.9	79.5	84.2	4.7	0.1	82.0	80.0	84.0	4.0
UKG1	Herefordshire, Worcestershire and Warwickshire	82.1	80.0	84.1	4.1	−0.2	81.9	80.1	83.6	3.5
UKK4	Devon	82.0	80.3	83.7	3.4	−0.1	81.9	80.0	83.7	3.7
UKD6	Cheshire	81.9	80.2	83.5	3.3	0.0	81.9	80.0	83.7	3.7
UKH3	Essex	81.7	80.2	83.2	3.0	0.1	81.8	80.3	83.3	3.0
UKD1	Cumbria	81.4	79.7	83.1	3.4	0.2	81.6	79.8	83.3	3.5
UKJ4	Kent	81.7	80.0	83.5	3.5	−0.1	81.6	79.7	83.4	3.7
UKF2	Leicestershire, Rutland and Northamptonshire	81.7	79.9	83.5	3.6	−0.2	81.5	79.9	83.2	3.3
UKK3	Cornwall and Isles of Scilly	81.7	80.0	83.4	3.4	−0.3	81.4	79.5	83.2	3.7
UKL2	East Wales	81.2	79.2	83.1	3.9	−0.2	81.0	79.1	83.0	3.9
UKF3	Lincolnshire	81.1	79.6	82.7	3.1	−0.1	81.0	79.0	82.9	3.9
UKF1	Derbyshire and Nottinghamshire	81.0	79.3	82.7	3.4	−0.1	80.9	79.3	82.6	3.3
UKG2	Shropshire and Staffordshire	81.1	79.5	82.7	3.2	−0.2	80.9	79.2	82.6	3.4
UKN0	Northern Ireland	80.6	78.6	82.6	4.0	0.3	80.9	79.1	82.6	3.5
UKE1	East Riding and North Lincolnshire	80.2	78.1	82.3	4.2	0.6	80.8	79.0	82.5	3.5
UKM5	North Eastern Scotland	80.4	78.6	82.2	3.6	−0.1	80.3	78.3	82.4	4.1
UKE3	South Yorkshire	80.5	78.7	82.2	3.5	−0.3	80.2	78.4	81.9	3.5
UKG3	West Midlands	80.3	78.2	82.3	4.1	−0.1	80.2	78.2	82.2	4.0
UKE4	West Yorkshire	80.4	78.4	82.2	3.8	−0.3	80.1	78.3	82.0	3.7
UKM6	Highlands and Islands	80.4	78.6	82.3	3.7	−0.4	80.0	78.4	81.7	3.3
UKD3	Greater Manchester	79.7	77.9	81.5	3.6	0.3	80.0	78.3	81.8	3.5
UKL1	West Wales and the Valleys	80.2	78.3	82.2	3.9	−0.2	80.0	78.0	82.0	4.0
UKD4	Lancashire	79.9	78.0	81.9	3.9	0.0	79.9	78.0	81.7	3.7
UKM7	Eastern Scotland	79.8	77.8	81.8	4.0	0.1	79.9	78.0	81.7	3.7
UKC2	Northumberland and Tyne and Wear	80.2	78.3	82.1	3.8	−0.3	79.9	77.8	82.0	4.2
UKC1	Tees Valley and Durham	79.8	77.9	81.6	3.7	0.0	79.8	78.0	81.6	3.6
UKD7	Merseyside	79.8	77.7	81.8	4.1	−0.2	79.6	77.7	81.3	3.6
UKM9	Southern Scotland	79.5	77.7	81.2	3.5	−0.3	79.2	77.4	80.8	3.4
UKM8	West Central Scotland	77.8	75.6	80.0	4.4	0.1	77.9	75.5	80.1	4.6

Data source: Eurostat

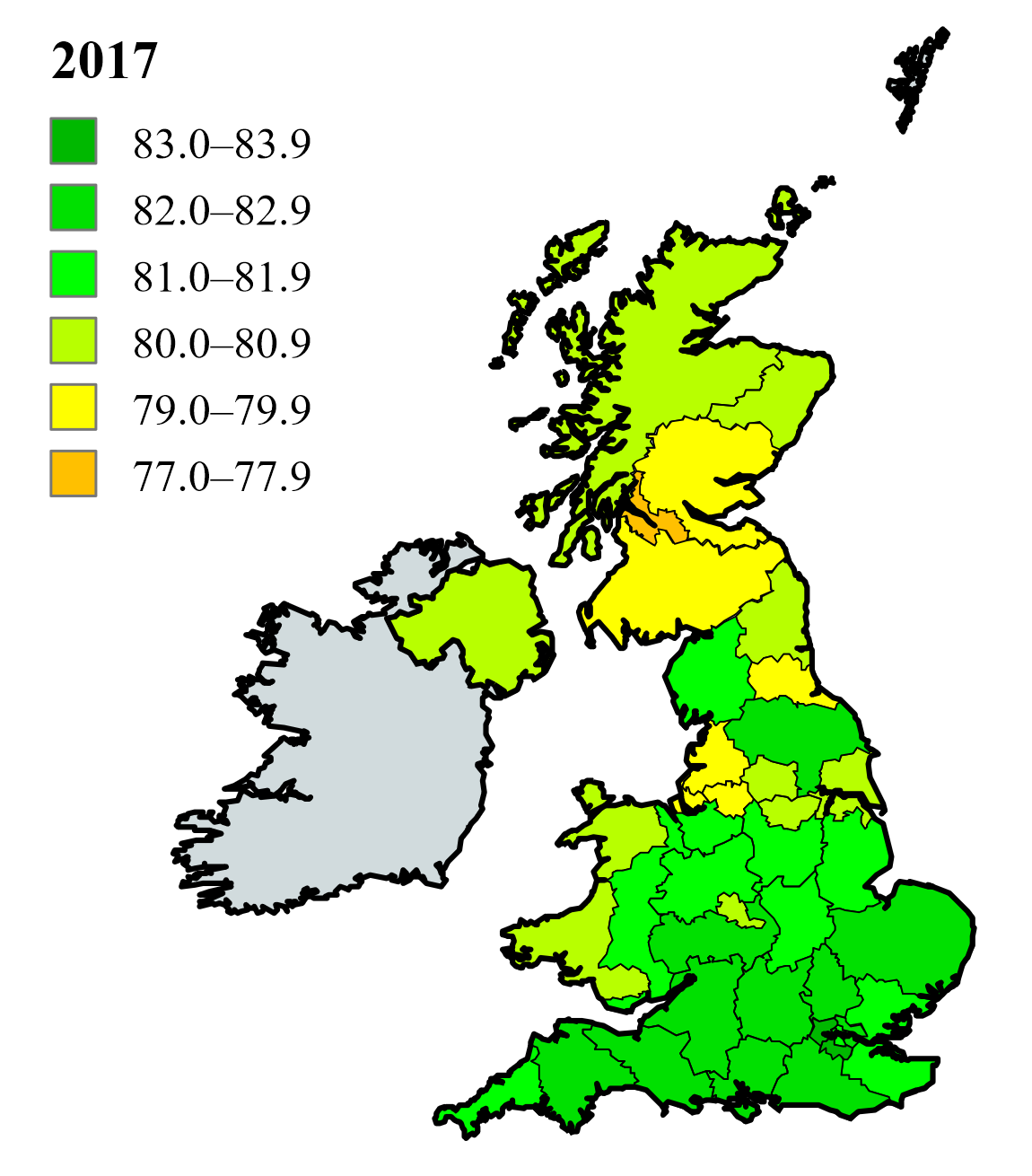
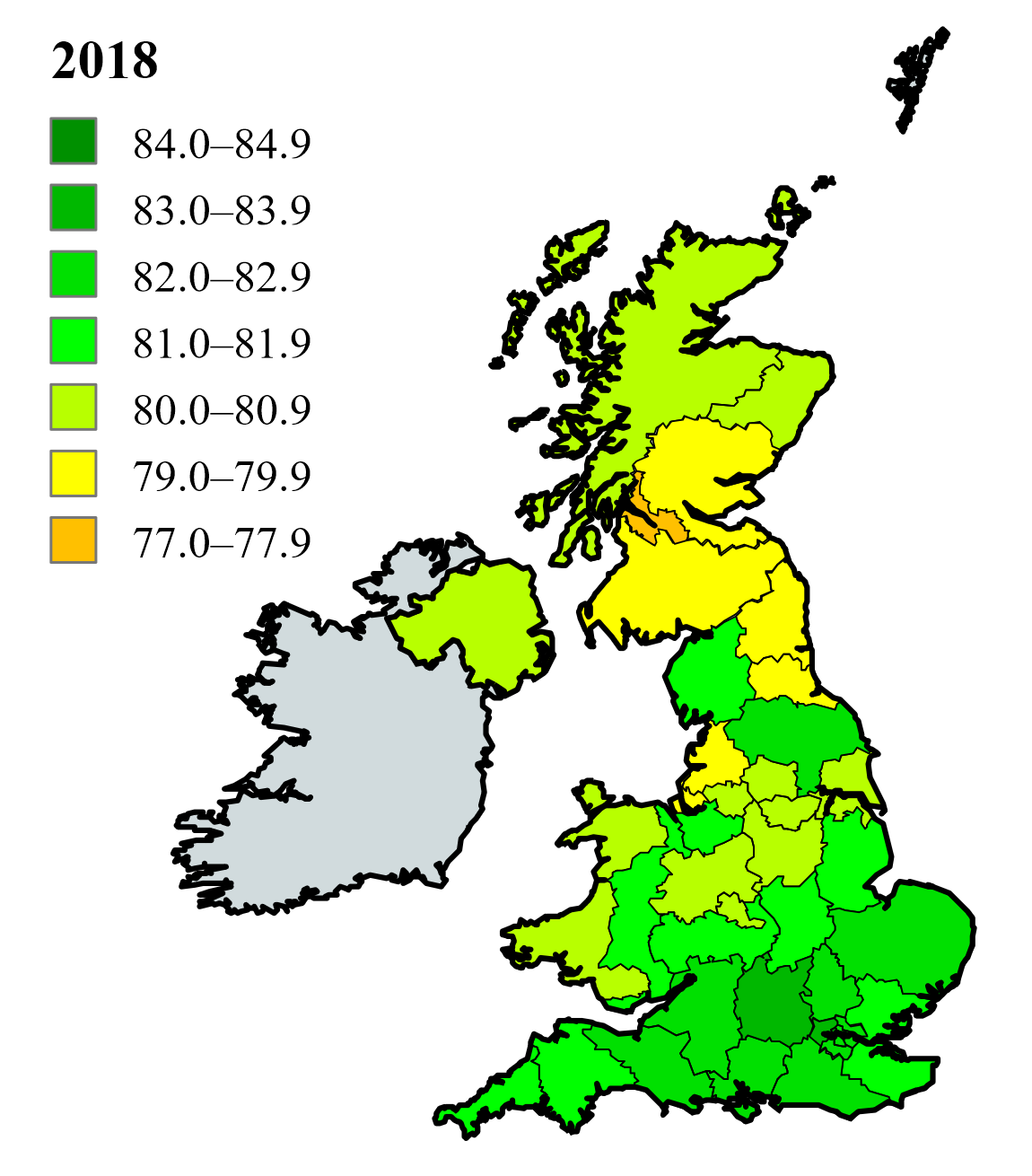
Life expectancy in British regions in 2017 and 2018, according to Eurostat
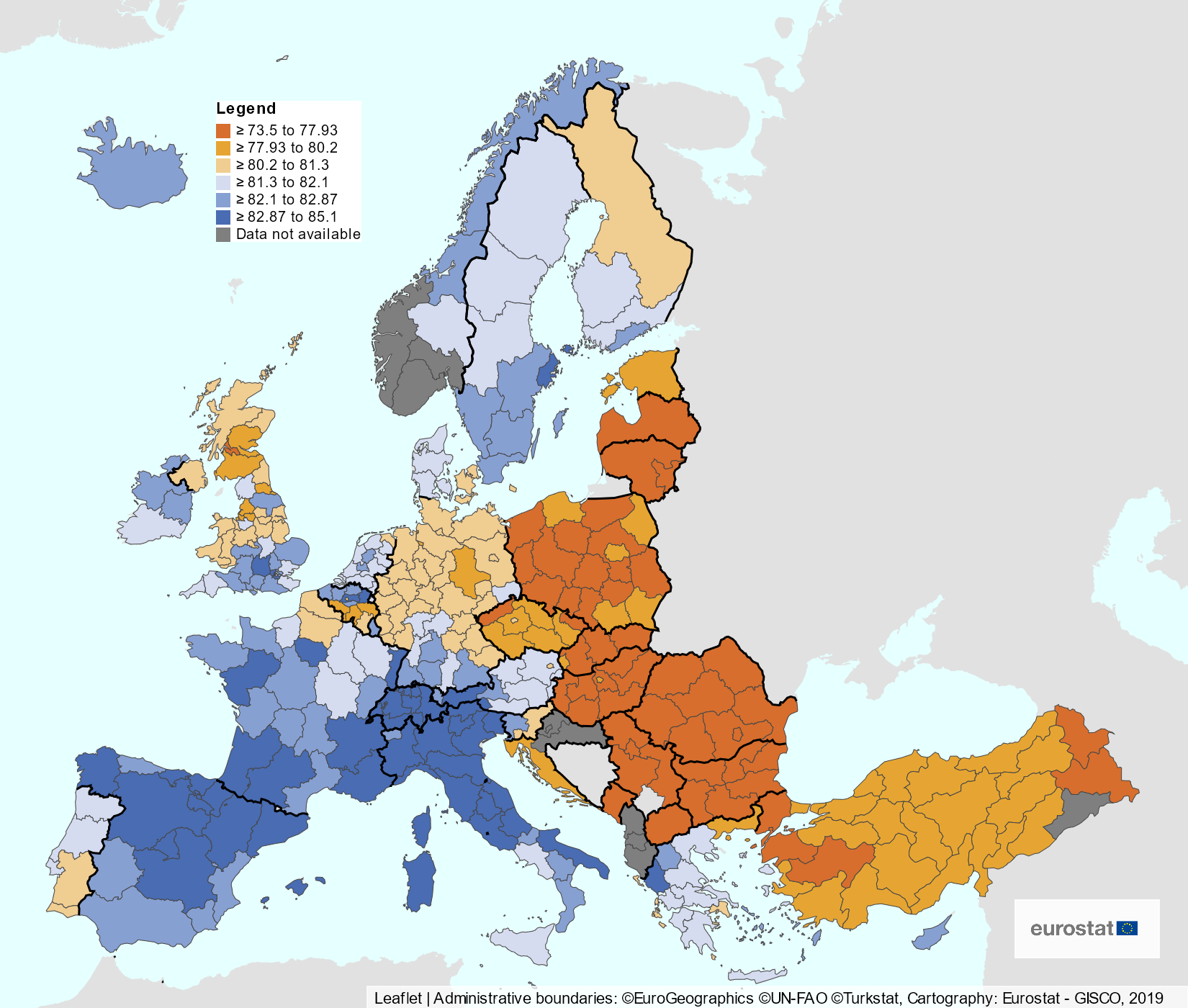
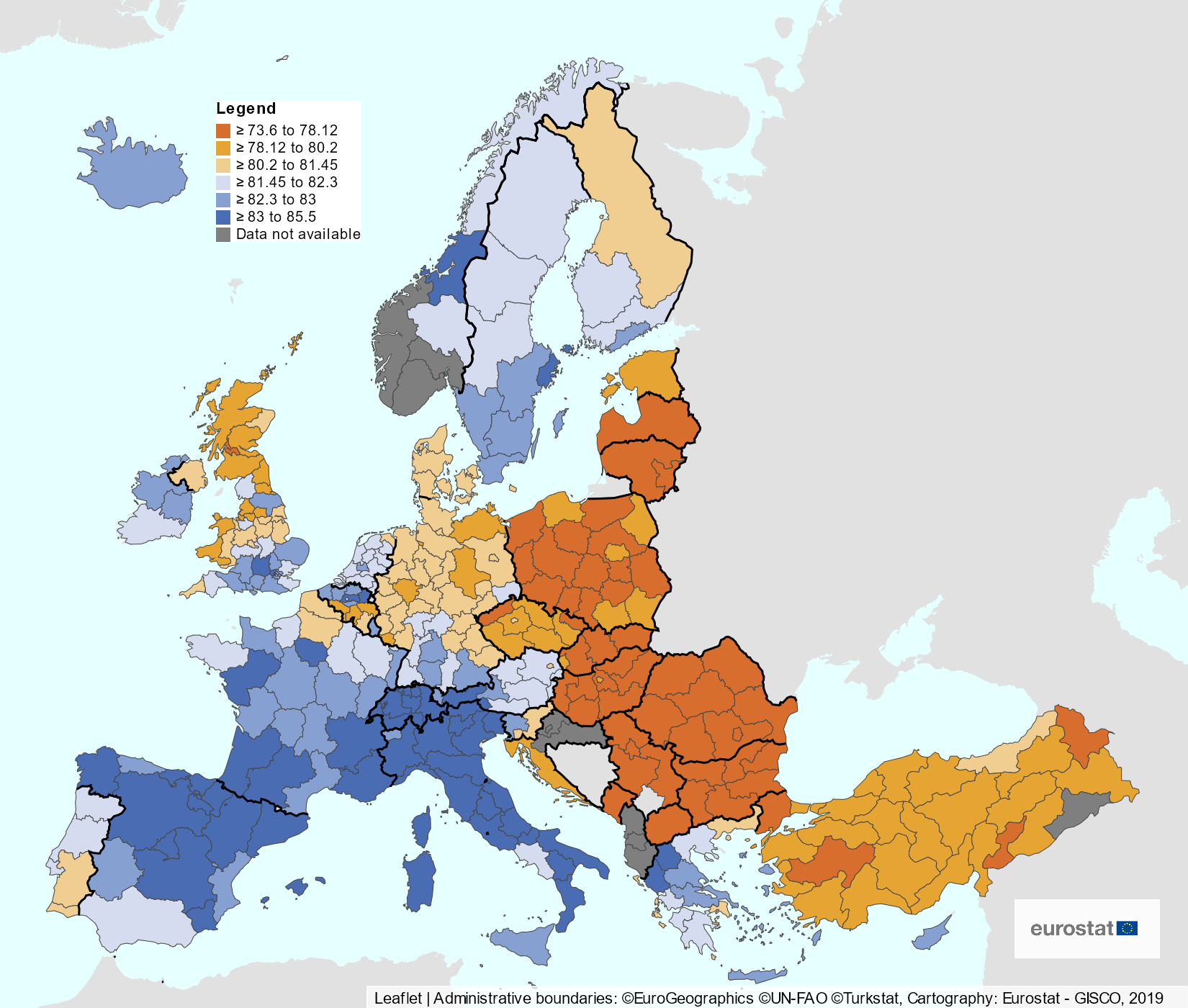
Life expectancy in British regions in comparison with regions of other European countries in 2017 and 2018, according to Eurostat
(legends on the maps are different)

== Global Data Lab (2019–2022) ==
region	2019				2019 →2021	2021	2021 →2022	2022				2019 →2022
region	overall	male	female	F Δ M	2019 →2021	overall	2021 →2022	overall	male	female	F Δ M	2019 →2022
United Kingdom on average	81.73	79.93	83.47	3.54	−0.99	80.74	1.42	82.16	80.44	83.83	3.39	0.43
London region	83.27	81.38	85.08	3.70	−1.00	82.27	1.44	83.71	81.89	85.45	3.56	0.44
South East England	83.03	81.36	84.64	3.28	−1.00	82.03	1.44	83.47	81.88	85.00	3.12	0.44
East of England	82.55	80.81	84.24	3.43	−0.99	81.56	1.42	82.98	81.33	84.61	3.28	0.43
South West England	82.54	80.74	84.31	3.57	−0.99	81.55	1.43	82.98	81.25	84.68	3.43	0.44
East Midlands	81.54	79.92	83.21	3.29	−0.98	80.56	1.41	81.97	80.43	83.57	3.14	0.43
Northern Ireland	81.29	79.54	82.93	3.39	−0.98	80.31	1.41	81.72	80.04	83.29	3.25	0.43
West Midlands	81.17	79.35	82.97	3.62	−0.97	80.20	1.40	81.60	79.85	83.32	3.47	0.43
Yorkshire and the Humber	80.96	79.21	82.69	3.48	−0.97	79.99	1.40	81.39	79.71	83.05	3.34	0.43
Wales	80.76	78.84	82.71	3.87	−0.97	79.79	1.40	81.19	79.34	83.06	3.72	0.43
North West England	80.63	78.86	82.35	3.49	−0.97	79.66	1.40	81.06	79.36	82.71	3.35	0.43
North East England	80.24	78.32	82.15	3.83	−0.96	79.28	1.38	80.66	78.82	82.51	3.69	0.42
Scotland	79.64	77.68	81.48	3.80	−0.96	78.68	1.38	80.06	78.17	81.84	3.67	0.42

Data source: Global Data Lab

== Charts ==
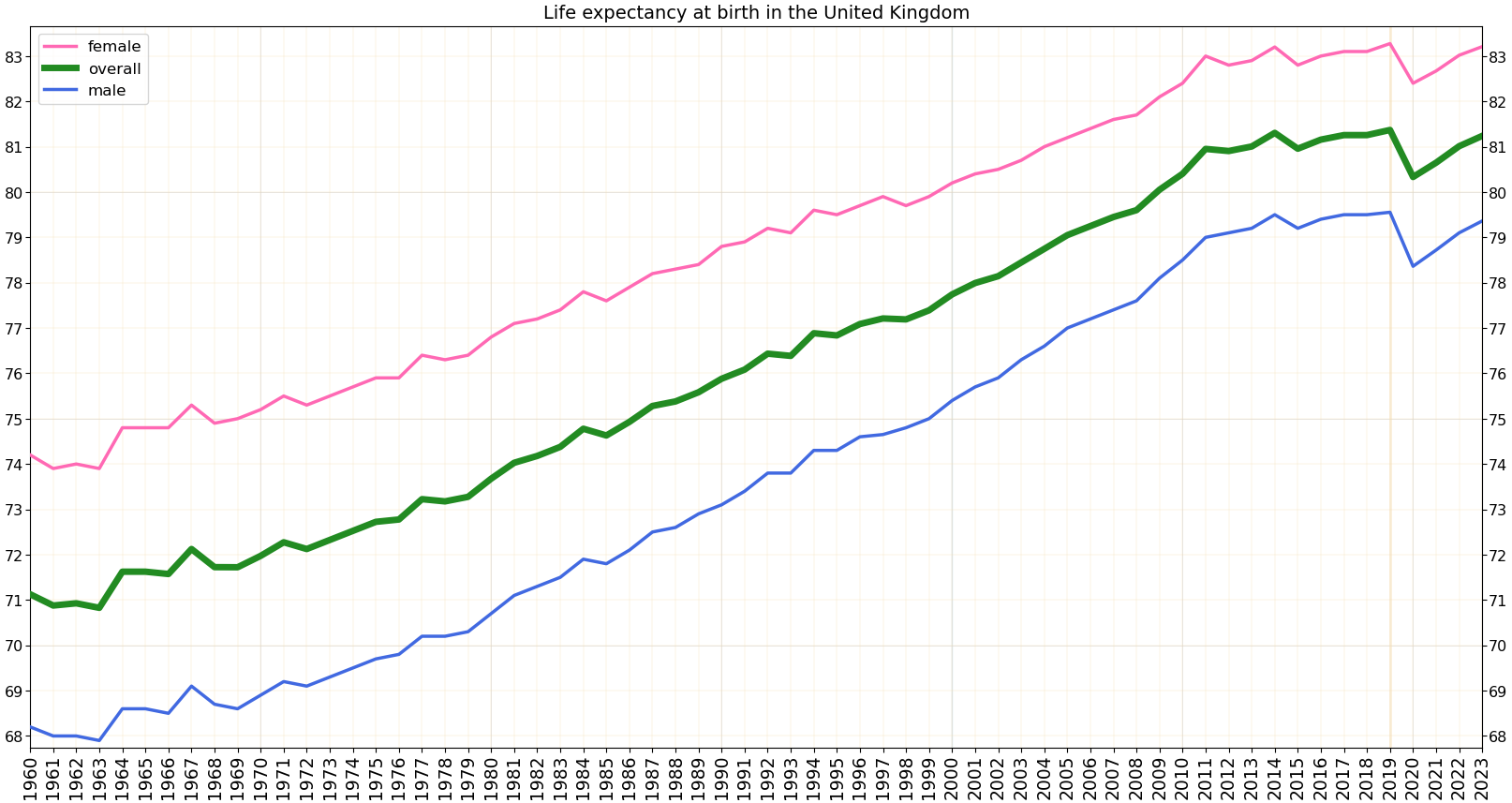
Development of life expectancy in the United Kingdom according to estimation of the World Bank Group

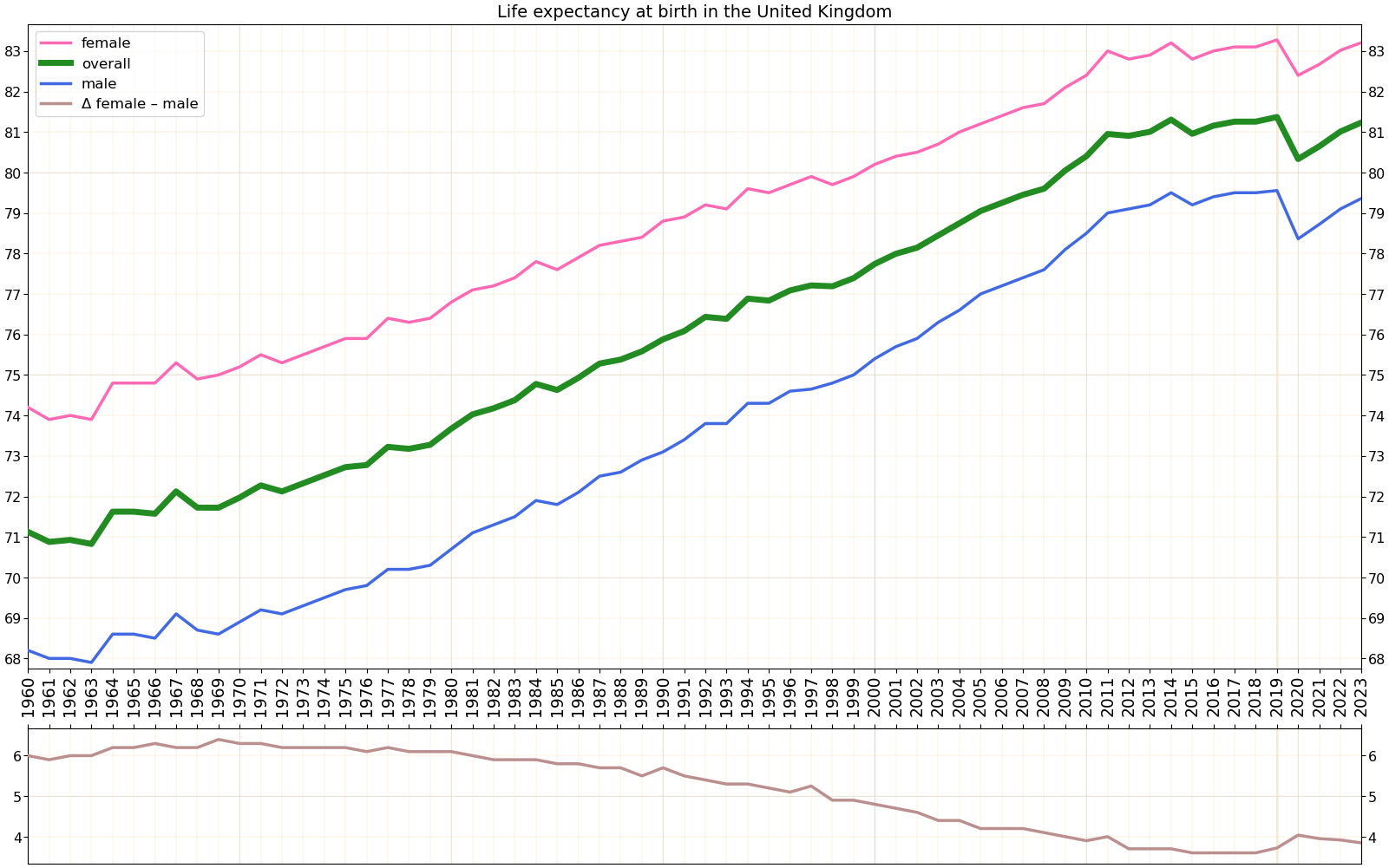
Life expectancy with calculated sex gap

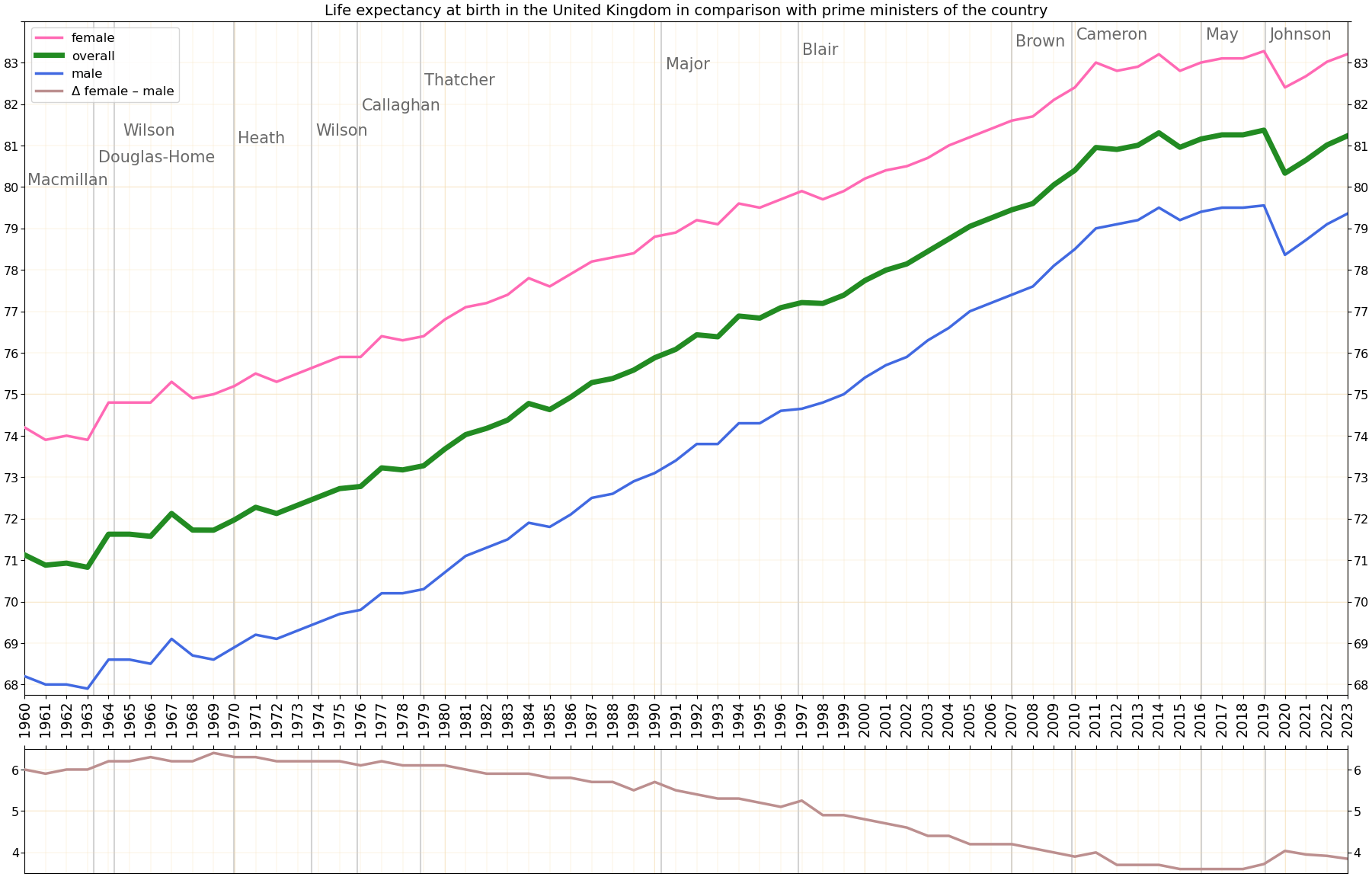
Life expectancy in comparison to prime ministers of the country

Life expectancy in the United Kingdom according to estimation of Our World in Data

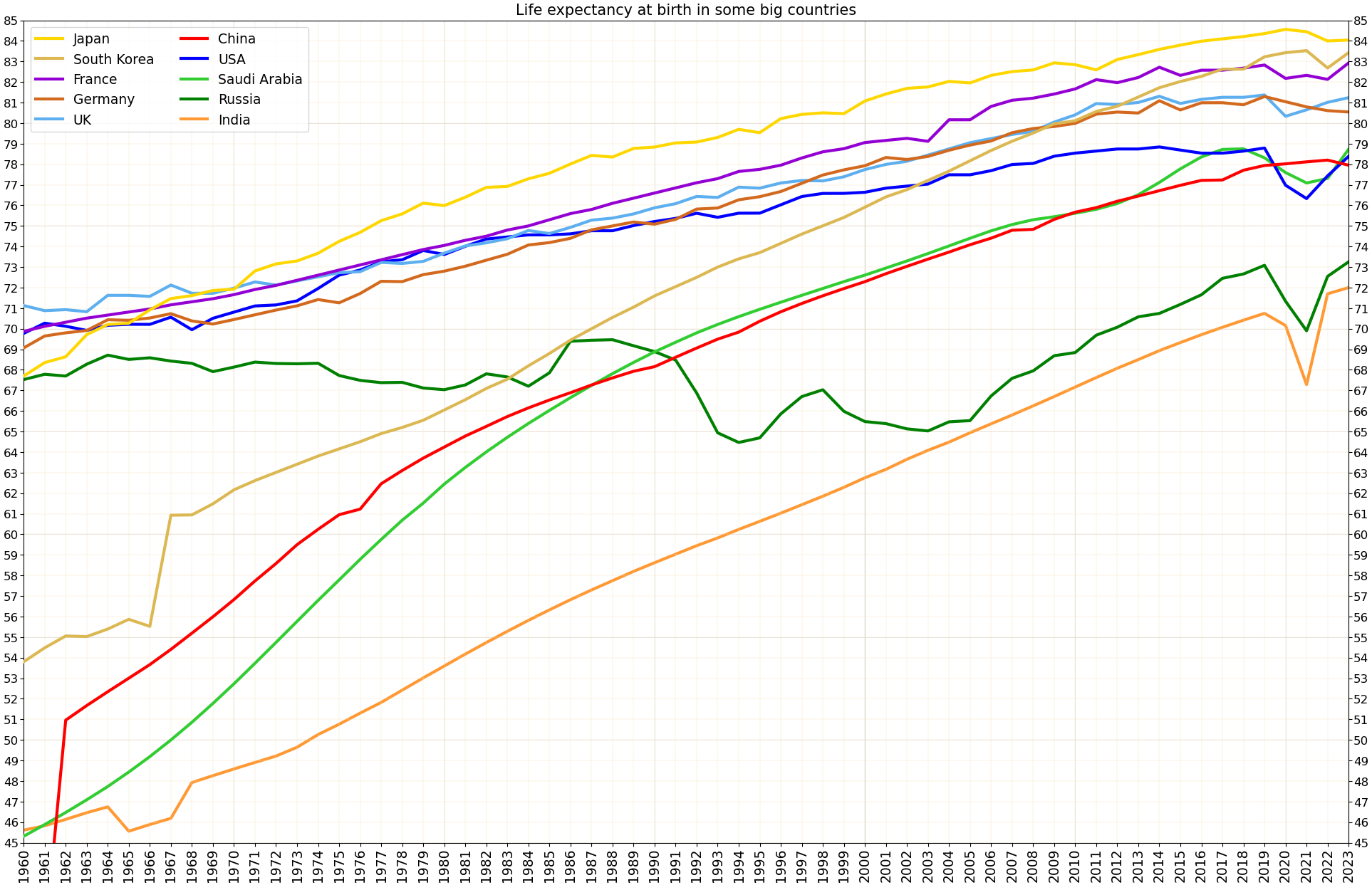
Development of life expectancy in the United Kingdom in comparison to some big countries of the world

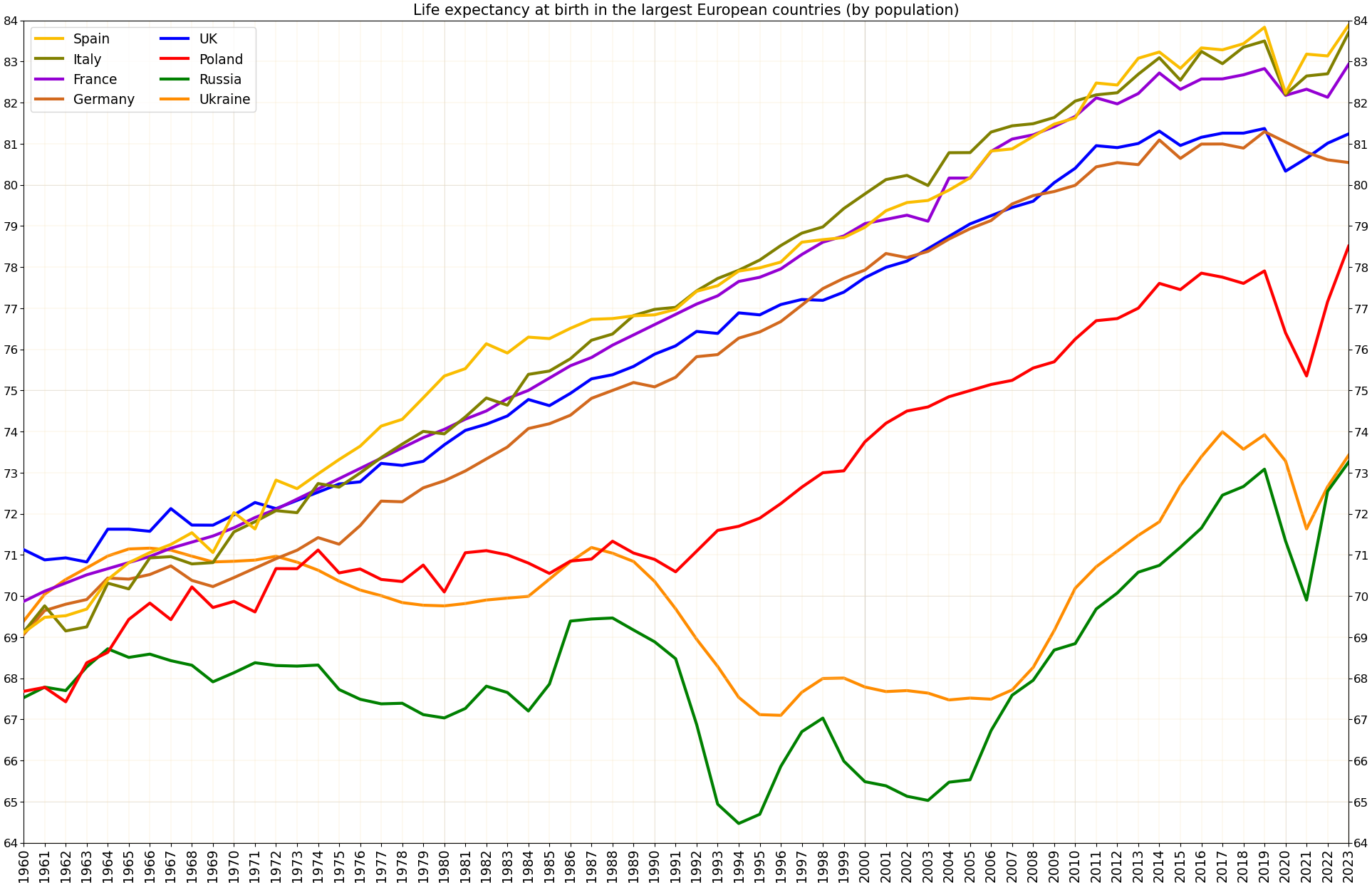
Development of life expectancy in the United Kingdom in comparison to the largest by population European countries

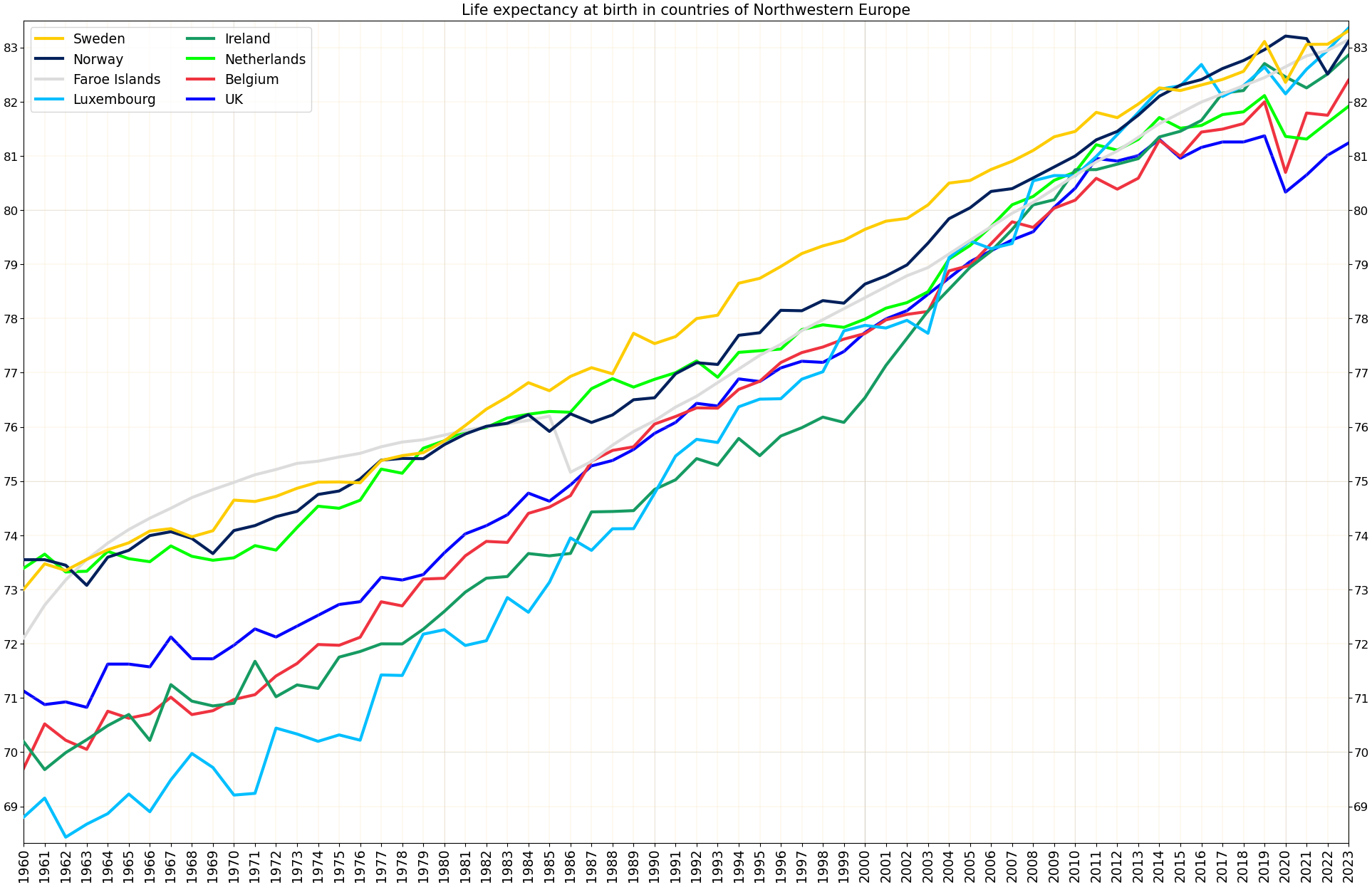
Development of life expectancy in the United Kingdom in comparison to neighboring countries
Life expectancy and healthy life expectancy in the United Kingdom on the background of other countries of the world in 2019

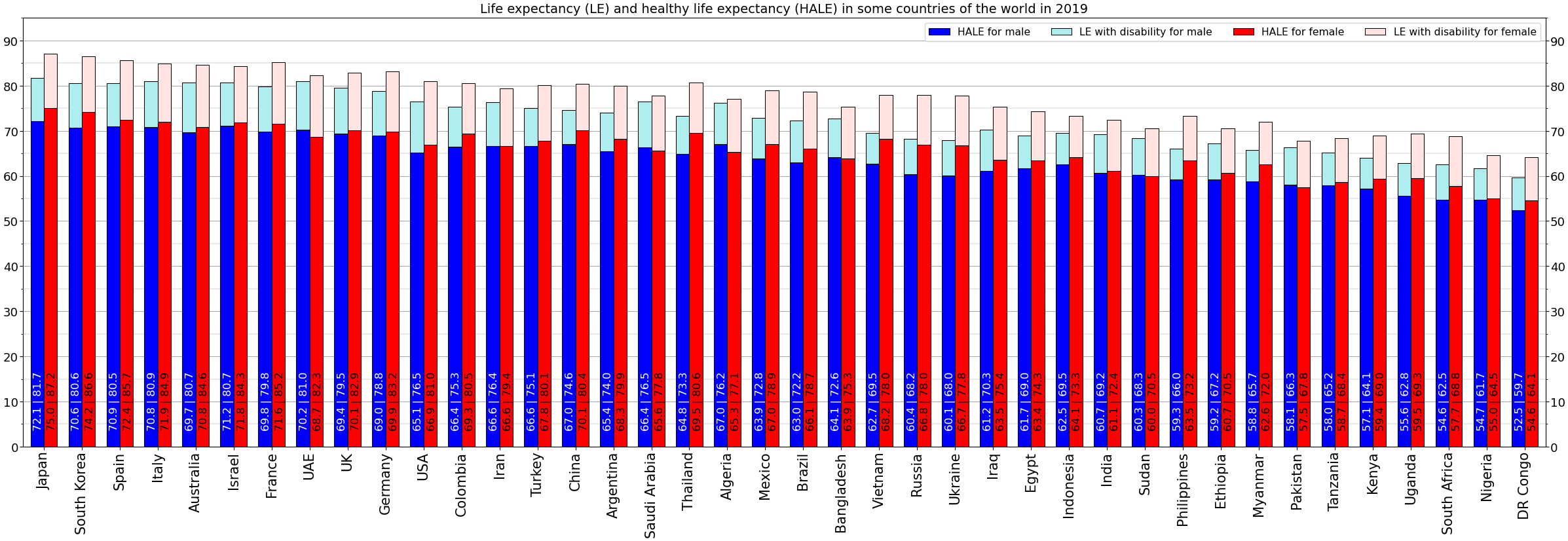
Life expectancy and healthy life expectancy for males and females separately
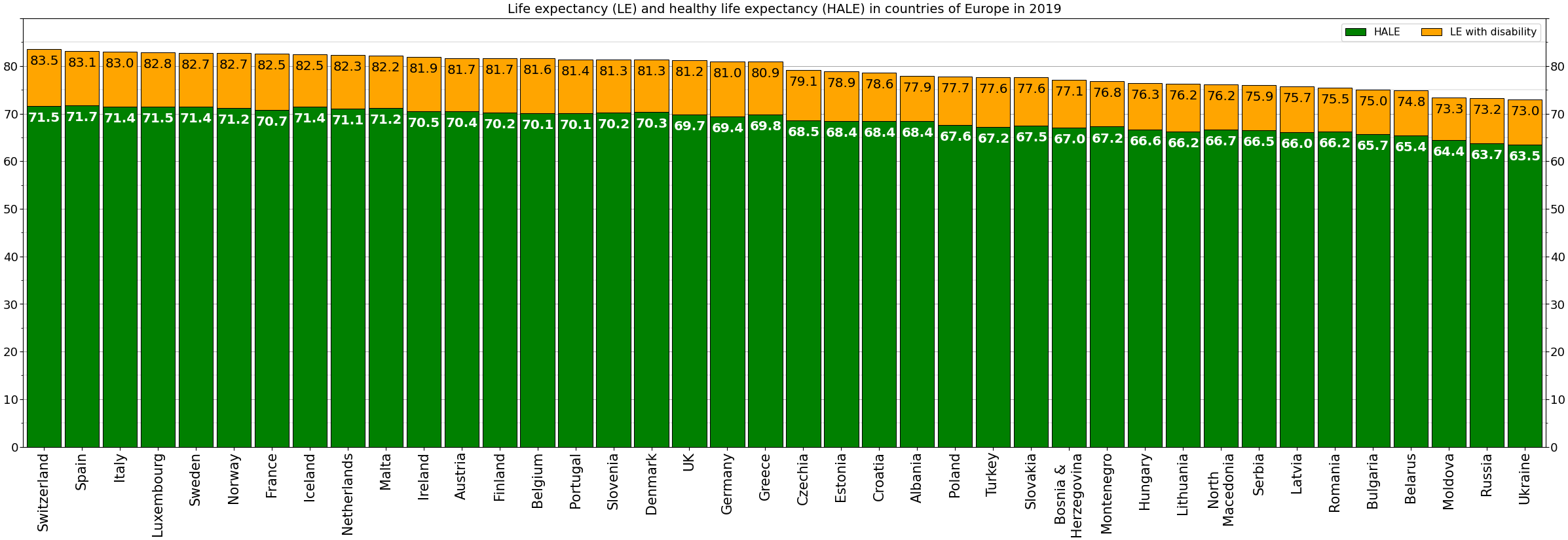
Life expectancy and healthy life expectancy in the United Kingdom on the background of other countries of Europe in 2019

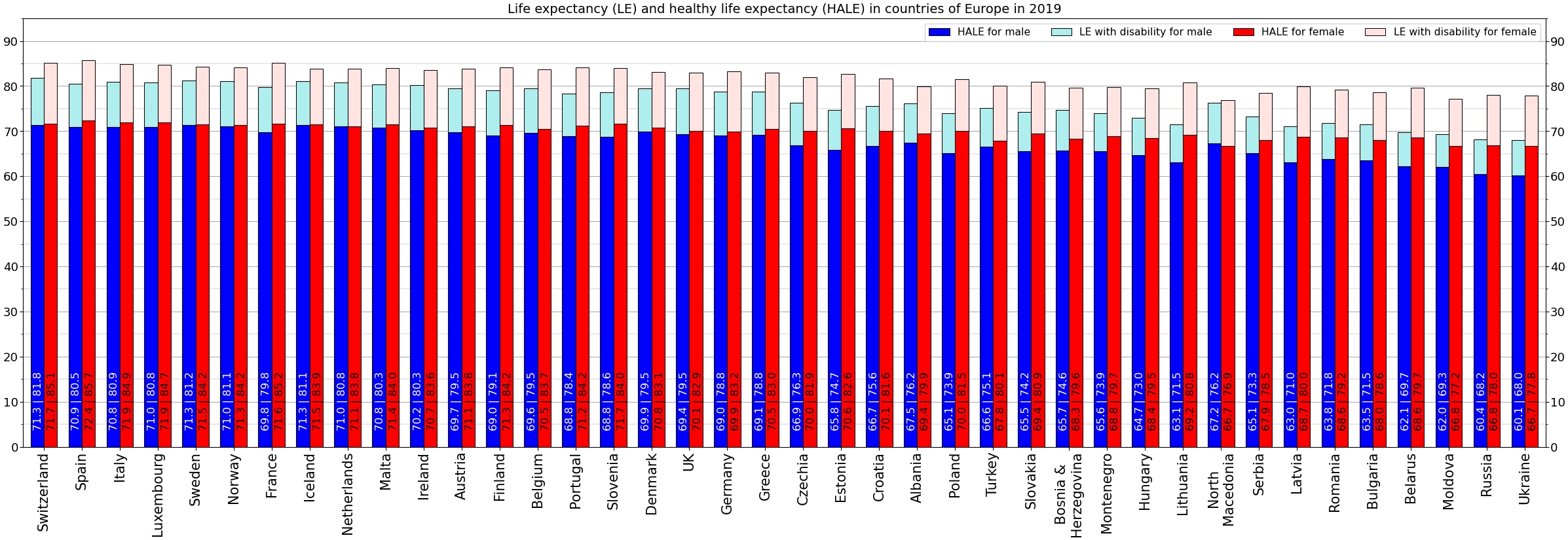
Life expectancy and healthy life expectancy for males and females separately

== See also ==
- List of countries by life expectancy
- List of European countries by life expectancy
- List of European regions by life expectancy
- Administrative geography of the United Kingdom
- Subdivisions of England
- Demographics of the United Kingdom
