= Pamela Sammons =

British educationalist

- Born: 1956 (age 69–70); Hillingdon, Middlesex
- Occupation: Professor Emeritus

Academic background
- Education: University of Bristol, City of London Polytechnic (Council for National Academic Awards)
- Thesis: Participation in Vocational Further Education: A study of factors influencing entry into commercial, construction and engineering training in inner London (1986)

Academic work
- Discipline: Education
- Institutions: University of Oxford; Jesus College, Oxford

Pamela Sammons is Professor (Emeritus) at the Department of Education, University of Oxford and an Emeritus Fellow at Jesus College, Oxford. Her educational research career spans over four decades and has focused on school effectiveness and improvement, educational leadership, teaching quality, and promoting equity in education. Sammons is also recognised for her methodological expertise in longitudinal studies and mixed methods research in education. From 2007 onwards, she has been listed in Who's Who for her work in Education and Scholarship.

== Biography ==
Sammons was born in 1956 and grew up in Hillingdon, Middlesex. She was awarded her PhD in 1986 for her study of vocational further education participation in inner London, after earning a Bachelor of Social Science (BSocSci) in Geography and Economics from the University of Bristol in 1977.

== Career ==
In 1999, Pamela Sammons was appointed Professor of Education at the Institute of Education, University of London, going on to hold professorships at the School of Education, University of Nottingham and the University of Oxford. She has led major research projects conducted in England, Scotland and Northern Ireland, including two seminal studies funded by the Department for Education (DfE). The first, the longitudinal Effective Provision of Pre-school Primary and Secondary Education (EPPSE) study which followed around 3000 children and young people from age 3 to post-16 years between 1997 and 2014, investigated the influence of pre-school on children’s academic and social-behavioural outcomes. Conceived before 1998 when the state had no statutory obligation to provide early childhood education or childcare for children under the age of five, EPPSE critically went on to inform the development of pre-school education policy in England by providing evidence of the long-term positive impact of pre-school on children's later outcomes - particularly for those who attended high quality pre-school settings. Case studies submitted during the Research Excellence Framework (REF) exercise (overseen by the Higher Education Funding Council for England (HEFCE)) featuring the impact of the EPPSE Study on wider society and education policy were both rated Outstanding (4*) by an independent panel of assessors in 2021 and 2014.

The second major study, the Evaluation of Children’s Centres in England (ECCE) comprised a six-year longitudinal impact study of children and families who used children’s centres between 2011 and 2014, an examination of centres' management, organisation and service offering, and a cost-benefit analysis of the programme. Findings from the ECCE study revealed the potential for children's centres' services to ameliorate social disadvantage. Both family engagement with children's centres' services and certain centre characteristics and processes (e.g. the maintenance or expansion of services and absence of budget cuts) showed positive effects, particularly for family and mothers' outcomes.

In 2015, Sammons led research on social mobility for the Sutton Trust exploring the drivers of academic success and students' aspirations for ‘bright but disadvantaged’ students. A frequent advisor to UK's Department for Education and the Treasury, Sammons has also provided policy and research advice to inspection agencies in England, Northern Ireland, Scotland, and Sweden, and co-developed educational effectiveness studies in Cyprus, Germany, Norway and Sweden. She was also co-author of the OECD 2012 country report on the Czech Republic. In 2014, she provided input to professional development of Challenge Advisors in Wales and was an advisor to the DfE for its research on the ‘London Effect’,. In 2020, Sammons was appointed External Academic Advisor for five years to the Norwegian Center for Learning Environment & Behavioural Research in Education based at the University of Stavanger and funded by the Research Council of Norway.

Sammons holds an H-index of 90 and over 46,000 citations, having published over 130 peer-reviewed journal articles, authored and co-authored 77 book chapters, monographs and policy publications, and co-written close to 200 research reports.

=== Academic awards and honours ===
- In 2023, Sammons, alongside colleagues Kathy Sylva, Edward Melhuish, Brenda Taggart and Iram Siraj (the Effective Provision of Preschool, Primary and Secondary Education (EPPSE) Study team), won the British Educational Research Association (BERA) Public Engagement and Impact Award for Transforming Early Education policy and practice.
- BERA Landmark Study Award - The British Educational Research Association (BERA) recognised the Effective Provision of Pre-school and Primary Education (EPPE 3-11) research as a ‘landmark study’ in celebrating 40 years of research (1974-2014) that has had ‘significant impact on educational policy, practice, research methodology and/or theory’ in the period 2004 to 2013.
- Emerald Literati Outstanding Paper Awards - Sammons and colleagues were twice awarded the Outstanding Paper Award, by the Journal of Children’s Services in 2016 and International Journal of Educational Management in 2012
- William J. Davis Award - Sammons and colleagues Christopher Day and Qing Gu were awarded the Outstanding Paper Award in 2017 for their article The Impact of Leadership on Student Outcomes: How Successful School Leaders Use Transformational and Instructional Strategies to Make a Difference in the journal Educational Administration Quarterly.

== Selected publications ==
- Sammons, P.; Sylva, K.; Hall, J.; Evangelou, M.; Smees, R. (2023). "Challenges facing interventions to promote equity in the early years: exploring the 'impact', legacy and lessons learned from a national evaluation of Children's Centres in England". Oxford Review of Education. 49 (1): 114–135. doi:10.1080/03054985.2022.2125371.
- Ertesvåg, S.K.; Sammons, P.; Blossing, U. (2021). "Integrating data in a complex mixed-methods classroom interaction study". British Educational Research Journal. 47 (3): 654–673. doi:10.1002/berj.3678. hdl:11250/2712192.
- Hall, J.E.; Lindorff, A.; Sammons, P., eds. (2020). International Perspectives in Educational Effectiveness Research. Springer Nature. doi:10.1007/978-3-030-44810-3. ISBN 978-3-030-44809-7.
- Siraj, I; Taggart, B.; Sammons, P.; Melhuish, E; Sylva, K.; Shepherd, D. (2019). Teaching in Effective Primary Schools Research into Pedagogy and children's learning. UCL-IOE Press. ISBN 9781858565064.
- Sammons, P.; Davis, S. (2017). "Mixed Methods approaches and their Application in Educational Research Initiative". In Wyse, D.; Selwyn, N.; Smith, E.; Suter, L. (eds.). The BERA/SAGE Handbook of Educational Research. BERA / SAGE. doi:10.4135/9781473983953.n24.
- Sammons, P.; Davis, S.; Gray, J. (2016). "Methodological and Scientific Properties of School Effectiveness Research: Exploring the underpinnings, evolution and future directions of the field Initiative". In Chapman, C.; Muijs, D.; Reynolds, D.; Sammons, P.; Teddlie, C. (eds.). The Routledge International Handbook of Educational Effectiveness and Improvement. Routledge. doi:10.4324/9781315679488. ISBN 9781315679488.
- Sammons, P.; Toth, K.; Sylva, K. (2015). Subject to Background: What promotes better achievement by bright but disadvantaged students? (PDF) (Report). The Sutton Trust.
- Sammons, P.; Sylva, K.; Melhuish, E.; Siraj-Blatchford, I.; Taggart, B.; Smees, R.; Draghici, D.; Toth, K. (2012). Effective Pre-school, Primary and Secondary Education 3-14 Project (EPPSE 3-14): Influences on students' dispositions in Key Stage 3: Exploring Enjoyment of school, Popularity, Anxiety, Citizenship Values and Academic self-concept in Year 9. Research Brief DFE-RB 184c (Report). Institute of Education, University of London / Department for Education.
- Teddlie, C.; Sammons, P. (2010). Creemers, B.P.M.; Kyriakides, L.; Sammons, P. (eds.). Methodological Advances in Educational Effectiveness Research. Routledge Taylor & Francis. doi:10.4324/9780203851005. ISBN 9780203851005.
- Sammons, P.; Sylva, K.; Melhuish, E.; Siraj-Blatchford, I.; Taggart, B.; Grabbe, Y.; Barreau, S. (2017). Effective Pre-school and Primary Education 3-11 Project (EPPE 3-11) Summary Report: Influences on Children's Attainment and Progress in Key Stage 2: Cognitive Outcomes in Year 5. Report No. RR828 (PDF) (Report). Department for Education and Skills (DfES).
- Sammons, P. (1999). School Effectiveness: Coming of Age in the 21st Century. Swets & Zeitlinger. ISBN 9789026515507.
- Sammons, P.; Thomas, S.; Mortimore, P. (28 October 1997). Forging Links: Effective Schools and Effective Departments. Paul Chapman. ISBN 1853963496.
