= Geography of Glasgow =

Glasgow is a city located on the banks of the River Clyde, Scotland.

== Climate ==
Glasgow

Climate chart (precipitation, max. and min. temperature)
J	F	M	A	M	J	J	A	S	O	N	D
142 6 2	99 7 2	110 9 3	60 12 4	63 16 7	63 18 10	68 20 12	84 19 12	116 16 9	132 13 7	131 9 4	138 7 2
- █ Average max. and min. temperatures in °C
- █ Precipitation totals in mm
- Source: MetOffice
Imperial conversion
J	F	M	A	M	J	J	A	S	O	N	D
5.6 44 35	3.9 45 35	4.3 48 37	2.4 54 40	2.5 60 45	2.5 64 49	2.7 67 53	3.3 66 53	4.6 61 49	5.2 55 44	5.2 48 38	5.4 45 36
- █ Average max. and min. temperatures in °F
- █ Precipitation totals in inches

Glasgow weather is typical of Scottish weather and often unpredictable. Despite its northerly latitude, similar to that of Moscow, Glasgow's climate is classified as oceanic (Köppen Cfb). Data is available online for 3 official weather stations in the Glasgow area: Paisley, Abbotsinch and Bishopton. All are located to the west of the city, in neighbouring Renfrewshire. Owing to its westerly position and proximity to the Atlantic Ocean, Glasgow is one of Scotland's milder areas. Winter temperatures are usually higher than in most places of equal latitude away from the UK, due to the warming influence of the Gulf Stream. However, this results in less distinct seasons as compared to continental Western Europe. At Paisley, the annual precipitation averages 1,245 mm (49.0 in). Glasgow has been named as the rainiest city of the UK, having an average of 170 days of rain a year.

The summer months (May to September) can be fine and sunny and mild. The winds are generally westerly, due to warm Gulf Stream. The warmest month, on average is July, averaging over 20 °C. However it can be very changeable, and normally a few degrees colder than southern England. Mornings can be damp and misty, or "dreich" (a Scottish word for damp and drizzly) and by afternoon sunny and warm. Spring (March to May) is fairly mild and is a popular time to visit Glasgow. Though some days are rainy and windy, Many of Glasgow's trees begin to flower at this time of the year and Glasgow's parks and gardens are filled with spring colour. Winters in Glasgow can be long and damp with fewer sunny days (though surprisingly warmer than other countries on the same latitude as Glasgow due to the effects of the Gulf Stream). The winds can be chilling and cold, though severe snow is infrequent and doesn't last too long. December, January and February are the wettest months of the year, though can be sunny if not warm.

Winters are cool and overcast, with a January mean of 5.0 °C (41.0 °F), though lows sometimes fall below freezing. Since 2000 Glasgow has experienced few very cold, snowy and harsh winters where temperatures have fallen much below freezing. The most extreme instances have however seen temperatures around −12 °C (10 °F) in the area. Snowfall accumulation is infrequent and short-lived. The spring months (March to May) are usually mild and often quite pleasant. Many of Glasgow's trees and plants begin to flower at this time of the year and parks and gardens are filled with spring colours. During the summer months (June to August) the weather can vary considerably from day to day, ranging from relatively cool and wet to quite warm with the odd sunny day. Long dry spells of warm weather are generally quite scarce. Overcast and humid conditions without rain are frequent. Generally the weather pattern is quite unsettled and erratic during these months, with only occasional heatwaves. The warmest month is usually July, with average highs above 20 °C (68 °F). Summer days can occasionally reach up to 27 °C (81 °F), and very rarely exceed 30 °C (86 °F). Autumns are generally cool to mild with increasing precipitation. During early autumn there can be some settled periods of weather and it can feel pleasant with mild temperatures and some sunny days.

The official Met Office data series goes back to 1959 and shows that there only have been a few warm and no hot summers in Glasgow, in stark contrast to areas further south in Great Britain and eastwards in Europe. The warmest month on record in the data series is July 2006, with an average high of 22.7 °C (72.9 °F) and low of 13.7 °C (56.7 °F). Even this extreme event only matched a normal summer on similar parallels in continental Europe, underlining the maritime influences.

Temperature extremes have ranged from −19.9 °C (−4 °F), at Abbotsinch in December 1995 to 31.9 °C (89 °F) at Bishopton in June 2018.

=== Statistics ===
Climate data for Paisley (Note: Weather station is located 7 miles (11 km) from the Glasgow city centre.), elevation: 16 m (52 ft) 1991–2020 normals, extremes 1959–present
Month	Jan	Feb	Mar	Apr	May	Jun	Jul	Aug	Sep	Oct	Nov	Dec	Year
Record high °C (°F)	13.5 (56.3)	14.4 (57.9)	17.2 (63.0)	24.4 (75.9)	26.5 (79.7)	29.6 (85.3)	30.0 (86.0)	31.0 (87.8)	26.7 (80.1)	22.8 (73.0)	17.7 (63.9)	14.1 (57.4)	31.0 (87.8)
Mean daily maximum °C (°F)	7.2 (45.0)	7.8 (46.0)	9.8 (49.6)	13.0 (55.4)	16.1 (61.0)	18.4 (65.1)	19.8 (67.6)	19.3 (66.7)	16.7 (62.1)	13.0 (55.4)	9.6 (49.3)	7.4 (45.3)	13.2 (55.8)
Daily mean °C (°F)	4.6 (40.3)	5.0 (41.0)	6.5 (43.7)	9.0 (48.2)	11.8 (53.2)	14.3 (57.7)	15.9 (60.6)	15.6 (60.1)	13.3 (55.9)	9.9 (49.8)	6.9 (44.4)	4.7 (40.5)	9.8 (49.6)
Mean daily minimum °C (°F)	2.1 (35.8)	2.2 (36.0)	3.2 (37.8)	5.1 (41.2)	7.4 (45.3)	10.3 (50.5)	12.1 (53.8)	11.9 (53.4)	9.9 (49.8)	6.8 (44.2)	4.2 (39.6)	2.1 (35.8)	6.5 (43.7)
Record low °C (°F)	−14.8 (5.4)	−7.5 (18.5)	−8.3 (17.1)	−4.4 (24.1)	−1.1 (30.0)	1.5 (34.7)	3.9 (39.0)	2.2 (36.0)	−0.2 (31.6)	−3.5 (25.7)	−6.8 (19.8)	−14.5 (5.9)	−14.8 (5.4)
Average precipitation mm (inches)	146.4 (5.76)	115.2 (4.54)	97.4 (3.83)	66.1 (2.60)	68.8 (2.71)	67.8 (2.67)	82.9 (3.26)	94.8 (3.73)	98.4 (3.87)	131.8 (5.19)	131.8 (5.19)	161.4 (6.35)	1,262.8 (49.72)
Average precipitation days (≥ 1.0 mm)	17.7	14.7	13.8	12.3	12.1	12.1	13.3	13.9	13.9	16.2	17.3	16.9	174.3
Mean monthly sunshine hours	38.6	67.3	104.3	141.4	186.8	155.6	151.5	145.5	114.6	86.3	53.9	33.7	1,279.6
Source 1: Met Office
Source 2: Starlings Roost Weather

Climate data for Abbotsinch (Note: Weather station is located 7 miles (11 km) from the Glasgow city centre.), elevation: 8 m (26 ft), 1991–2020 normals, extremes 1951–present
Month	Jan	Feb	Mar	Apr	May	Jun	Jul	Aug	Sep	Oct	Nov	Dec	Year
Record high °C (°F)	13.6 (56.5)	14.4 (57.9)	20.3 (68.5)	24.0 (75.2)	27.4 (81.3)	31.9 (89.4)	30.1 (86.2)	31.2 (88.2)	28.8 (83.8)	23.9 (75.0)	16.4 (61.5)	14.6 (58.3)	31.9 (89.4)
Mean daily maximum °C (°F)	6.7 (44.1)	7.4 (45.3)	9.2 (48.6)	12.2 (54.0)	15.4 (59.7)	17.8 (64.0)	19.3 (66.7)	18.9 (66.0)	16.5 (61.7)	12.8 (55.0)	9.3 (48.7)	6.8 (44.2)	12.7 (54.9)
Daily mean °C (°F)	4.1 (39.4)	4.5 (40.1)	5.9 (42.6)	8.2 (46.8)	10.9 (51.6)	13.6 (56.5)	15.3 (59.5)	14.9 (58.8)	12.9 (55.2)	9.6 (49.3)	6.4 (43.5)	4.1 (39.4)	9.2 (48.6)
Mean daily minimum °C (°F)	1.5 (34.7)	1.6 (34.9)	2.6 (36.7)	4.2 (39.6)	6.5 (43.7)	9.4 (48.9)	11.2 (52.2)	10.9 (51.6)	9.2 (48.6)	6.4 (43.5)	3.6 (38.5)	1.4 (34.5)	5.7 (42.3)
Record low °C (°F)	−17.4 (0.7)	−15.0 (5.0)	−12.5 (9.5)	−5.4 (22.3)	−3.9 (25.0)	1.2 (34.2)	0.8 (33.4)	1.1 (34.0)	−4.0 (24.8)	−7.1 (19.2)	−10.4 (13.3)	−19.9 (−3.8)	−19.9 (−3.8)
Average precipitation mm (inches)	157.3 (6.19)	125.0 (4.92)	112.4 (4.43)	73.2 (2.88)	71.9 (2.83)	80.8 (3.18)	91.9 (3.62)	107.1 (4.22)	109.4 (4.31)	135.7 (5.34)	145.0 (5.71)	160.7 (6.33)	1,370.2 (53.94)
Average precipitation days (≥ 1.0 mm)	18.2	15.2	14.9	12.6	12.2	12.8	13.4	14.5	14.3	17.2	18.0	18.0	181.2
Mean monthly sunshine hours	45.9	70.0	106.1	148.2	197.2	159.2	162.7	152.9	117.9	84.9	57.5	41.7	1,344.1
Source 1: Met Office
Source 2: Starlings Roost Weather

== Demographics ==
=== Population density ===
Glasgow's population peaked in 1931 at 1,088,000, and for over 40 years remained over 1 million. However, in the 1960s the population started to decline, partly due to relocation to the "new towns" in clearings of the poverty-stricken inner city areas like the Gorbals. In addition, successive boundary changes reduced the official city boundaries (and hence its official population) making direct comparisons difficult as the city expands beyond the local council boundaries.

==== Historical population ====
Year	Population	Change	% Change	Inhabitants/sq mi	Inhabitants/km^{2}
1891	783,000			11,634	4,492
1911	784,000	1,000	0.1%	11,649	4,498
1921	1,034,000	250,000	31.9%	15,364	5,932
1931	1,088,000	54,000	5.2%	16,166	6,242
1941	n/a				
1951	1,079,000	(9,000)	-0.8%	16,033	6,190
1961	1,055,000	(24,000)	-2.2%	15,676	6,053
1971	897,000	(158,000)	-15.0%	13,328	5,146
1981	881,000	(16,000)	-1.8%	13,091	5,054
1991	681,000	(200,000)	-22.7%	10,119	3,907
2001	579,869	(102,000)	-15.0%	8,603	3,322
2011	593,245	15,376	+4.6%	8,540	3,298

Source: 2001 Census "Demographia.com".

==== Current statistics ====
Due to council boundary changes since the 1991 census, Greater Glasgow has four distinct definitions for the population of Glasgow in the 2001 Census: the smallest is the new Glasgow City Council Area (which lost the district of Rutherglen to South Lanarkshire in 1996), the Greater Glasgow Health Board area (covered by the local NHS Trust), the City of Glasgow Locality Area (formerly Glasgow District Council Area) and the Greater Glasgow Metropolitan Settlement Area (including surrounding localities).

Location	Population	Area (km²)	Density (/km²)	Area (sq mi)	Density (/sq mi)
Glasgow City Council	577,869	175.49	3293	67.75	8,528
City of Glasgow locality	629,501	162.10	3883	62.58	10,058
Greater Glasgow Health Board	867,150	555.27	1562	214.38	4,044
Greater Glasgow Settlement Area	1,168,270	368.46	3171	142.26	8,212

Source 2001 Census

Since the 2001 census the population decline has stabilised. The 2004 population of the city council area was 585,090 and the population of both the City of Glasgow Council area and Greater Glasgow are forecast to grow in the near future. Around 2,300,000 people live in the Greater Glasgow conurbation, defined as the City of Glasgow and the surrounding region.

Compared to Inner London (22,438 people per square mile), Scotland's major city has less than half the current population density of the English capital (8,528). However, in 1931 the population density was 16,011, highlighting the subsequent "clearances" to the suburbs and new towns that were built to empty one of Europe's most densely populated cities.

== Notes ==
- The official population of Glasgow City Council unitary authority.
- The City of Glasgow locality, as defined by the 2001 Census. Localities are sub-divisions of 2001 Settlements that are based on 1991 Locality boundaries.
- The Greater Glasgow Settlement Area or Metropolitan Area was created from groups of neighbouring urban postcodes grouped so that each group of postcode unit contains at least a given number of addresses per hectare and the group contains at least 500 residents and includes the following localities: Airdrie, Bargeddie, Barrhead, Bellshill, Bishopbriggs, Bothwell, Busby, Calderbank, Carfin, Chapelhall, Clarkston, Clydebank, Coatbridge, Duntocher and Hardgate, Elderslie, Faifley, Giffnock, Glasgow, Holytown, Howwood, Johnstone, Kilbarchan, Linwood, Milngavie, Milton, Motherwell, New Stevenston, Newarthill, Newmains, Newton Mearns, Old Kilpatrick, Paisley, Renfrew, Stepps, Uddingston Viewpark and Wishaw.
