= Elizabeth Pat Story =

Elizabeth Pat Story (1931–2025) was an educationalist known for her work on the Cambridge Latin Course textbooks.

== Education ==
Story studied for a PGCE at Hughes Hall, Cambridge, in 1953.

== Career ==
Story taught in a girls' grammar school for several years, and by 1967 was working in the Department of Education, University of Oxford. Subsequently, she joined the Cambridge School Classics Project as evaluation officer in 1967. Story returned to Hughes Hall in 1971, where she later held the roles of senior tutor and vice president. Story became deputy director of the Cambridge School Classics Project in 1976, and was promoted to director in 1987. She retired in 1991.

== Cambridge Latin Course ==
Story was influential on the development of the Cambridge Latin Course textbook series. Among her contributions were the graded test initiative and the Independent Learner Manuals.
