= Kathy Sylva =

Educational psychologist

Kathy Sylva FAcSS FBA OBE is an educational psychologist. She is Professor Emeritus of Educational Psychology at the University of Oxford.

== Biography ==
Sylva has a BA in Psychology and Social relations, and a master's degree and PHD in Developmental Psychology, all from Harvard University.

In 2002 Sylva was awarded an honorary doctorate from the Open University. She also received an honorary doctorate from Oxford Brookes University in 2005. She was awarded an OBE in 2008 for services to children and families. In 2014 she was awarded the inaugural John Nisbet Fellowship from the British Educational Research Association.

Sylva is a Fellow of the Academy of Social Sciences. She was elected as Fellow of the British Academy in 2020.

== Select publications ==
- Sylva, K., Sammons, P., Melhuish, E. et al. 2020. "Developing 21st century skills in early childhood: the contribution of process quality to self-regulation and pro-social behaviour", Zeitschrift für Erziehungswissenschaft 23, 465–484. doi:10.1007/s11618-020-00945-x.
- Hall, J., Sammons, P., Smees, R., Sylva, K., Evangelous, M., Goff, J., Smith, T., and Smith, G. 2019. "Relationships between families’ use of Sure Start Children's Centres, changes in home learning environments, and preschool behavioural disorders", Oxford Review of Education 45(3), 367–389.
- Sylva, K. 2014. "The role of families and pre-school in educational disadvantage", Oxford Review of Education 40(6), 680–695. doi:10.1080/03054985.2014.979581.
