= Edward Melhuish =

British developmental psychologist

Edward C. Melhuish OBE
- Occupations: Developmental psychologist, academic, and consultant

Academic background
- Education: BSc (Hons); PhD
- Alma mater: University of Bristol; University of London

Edward C. Melhuish (born 1950) is a developmental psychologist, academic and consultant. He is an emeritus professor at the University of Oxford and Birkbeck, University of London, Pao Yu-Kong Foundation Professor at Zhejiang University, and director of the Human Development Research Unit at Beijing City University and Beijing Normal University.

Melhuish's research interests have included longitudinal investigations on childhood cognitive, social, educational, and communicative development, with a focus on environmental factors. He is a fellow of the Association for Psychological Science.

== Education ==
Melhuish completed his BSc (Hons) from the University of Bristol in 1971. Later in 1979, he earned his PhD from Bedford College, University of London.

== Career ==
Melhuish began his career as a research assistant at St Mary's Medical School, University of London, before becoming a lecturer and senior lecturer at the University of Hertfordshire from 1973 to 1982. Subsequently, he held the position of principal research officer at the University of London till 1989. At the University of Wales, Bangor, he was designated as a senior lecturer between 1989 and 1994. Later, in the same year, he was appointed as a professor of Human Development at Cardiff University till 2001. At the University of London, Birkbeck, he directed the National Evaluation of Sure Start from 2001 to 2012, and since then has been an emeritus professor there. Additionally, from 2012 to 2025, he served as a Professor II at Oslo Metropolitan University.

From 2012 to 2022, Melhuish was employed as a professor of Human Development at the University of Oxford and, since then, holds the title of emeritus professor. Since 2024, he has been the Pao Yu-Kong Foundation Professor at Zhejiang University. In 2025, he acquired the titles of visiting professor at Beijing City University and honorary professor of Beijing Normal University. Additionally, in the same year, he was appointed as director of the Human Development Research Unit of Beijing City University and Beijing Normal University. Throughout his career, he has also held consultancy roles at organizations, including European Commission, OECD, and WHO.

== Works ==
In collaboration with Alison Hipwell, Frits Goossens, and R. Kumar, Melhuish carried out a research study to assess disruption in child-mother interactions at one-year postpartum, illustrating that infants with depressed mothers are more likely to experience severe attachment risks. Moreover, he reported that parental opioid usage also negatively influences children's physical and neurocognitive development.

Melhuish reported the association between preschool programs and cognitive development, and the interconnectedness among teacher and child interactions and shared thinking. He studied the interdependence between preschool attendance and socio-economic backgrounds. He highlighted that academic under-achievements are associated with children's development and experiences during the starting years of their schooling. He also stated that the assessment of the home-learning environment indicated numeracy achievement among five-year-old children.

In 2006, Melhuish co-edited a book titled Early Childhood Care and Education: International Perspectives, in which he investigated how early childhood programs are being addressed in various nations and how they impact young children's experiences and development. Pamela Oberhuemer characterized it as a "valuable collection of papers" and stated that it provided a "fascinating overview" of policies and research findings. Joseph Di Bona commented that this write-up has "inevitable unevenness" because of involving a dozen authors. Additionally, he co-edited another book, The National Evaluation of Sure Start: Does Area-Based Early Intervention Work?, in which he examined the development of child health and welfare programs for Sure Start, highlighted the differences between the expected and actual performance of Sure Start Local Programmers (SSLPs) in terms of costs, strengths, and shortcomings. Reviewing the book, Gillian Brid wrote that each chapter contains a "robust, well-referenced, and detailed analysis" of the various aspects of the SSL.

In Early Childhood Matters: Evidence from the Effective Pre-school and Primary Education Project, Melhuish documented how early childhood education and care advanced significantly between the late 1990s and the start of the new millennium, primarily emphasizing the role of the Effective Pre-School and Primary Education (EPPE) project in this regards. The book was reviewed by Naomi Eisenstadt, a senior research fellow at Oxford University, who stated that "anyone who has worked in Britain over the last 10 years in the field of early education and care will, whether they know it or not, have been influenced by EPPE. Indeed, many people currently employed in early years’ services owe the fact of their employment at least in part to the findings from this remarkable research". However, she also noted that it had little reference to pre-Labour policy framework and found it to be a "bit disjointed".

== Awards and honors ==
- 2016 – Fellow, Association for Psychological Science
- 2016 – Officer of the Order of the British Empire (OBE), Government of the United Kingdom

== Bibliography ==
=== Selected books ===
- Melhuish, Edward C.; Moss, Peter (1991). Day Care for Young Children: International Perspectives. Routledge. ISBN 9780415017466.
- Melhuish, Edward; Petrogiannis, Konstantinos (2006). Early Childhood Care & Education: International Perspectives. Taylor & Francis. ISBN 9781134176151.
- Melhuish, Edward; Barnes, Jacqueline; Belsky, Jay (2007). The National Evaluation of Sure Start: Does Area-based Early Intervention Work?. Policy Press. ISBN 9781861349491.
- Sylva, Kathy; Melhuish, Edward; Sammons, Pam; Siraj-Blatchford, Iram; Taggart, Brenda (2010). Early Childhood Matters: Evidence from the Effective Pre-school and Primary Education Project. Routledge. ISBN 9781135189860.
- Dyson, Alan; Jensen, Bjarne Bruun; Currie, Candice; Melhuish, Edward; Eisenstadt, Naomi; Barnekow, Vivian (2013). Improving the Lives of Children and Young People: Case Studies from Europe: School · Volume 3. WHO Regional Office for Europe. ISBN 9789289000499.

=== Selected articles ===
- Mills, M.; Melhuish, E. (1974). "Recognition of mother's voice in early infancy". Nature. 252 (5479): 123–124. Bibcode:1974Natur.252..123M. doi:10.1038/252123a0. PMID 4420642.
- Melhuish, Edward C. (1982). "Visual attention to mother's and stranger's faces and facial contrast in 1-month-old infants". Developmental Psychology. 18 (2): 229–231. doi:10.1037/0012-1649.18.2.229.
- Melhuish, E. C.; Lloyd, E.; Martin, S.; Mooney, A. (1990). "Type of Childcare at 18 Months–II. Relations with Cognitive and Language Development". Journal of Child Psychology and Psychiatry. 31 (6): 861–870. doi:10.1111/j.1469-7610.1990.tb00830.x. PMID 2246338.
- Melhuish, Edward; Belsky, Jay; Anning, Angela; Ball, Mog; Barnes, Jacqueline; Romaniuk, Helena; Leyland, Alastair; The NESS Research Team (2007). "Variation in community intervention programmes and consequences for children and families: the example of Sure Start Local Programmes". Journal of Child Psychology and Psychiatry. 48 (6): 543–551. doi:10.1111/j.1469-7610.2007.01705.x. PMID 17537070.
- Melhuish, Edward C.; Sylva, Kathy; Sammons, Pam; Siraj-Blatchford, Iram; Taggart, Brenda; Phan, Mai B.; Malin, Antero (2008). "Preschool Influences on Mathematics Achievement". Science. 321 (5893): 1161–1162. doi:10.1126/science.1158808. PMID 18755959.
- Melhuish, Edward; Belsky, Jay; Leyland, Alastair H.; Barnes, Jacqueline; Research Team, NESS (2008). "Effects of fully-established Sure Start Local Programmes on 3-year-old children and their families living in England: a quasi-experimental observational study". The Lancet. 372 (9650): 1641–1647. doi:10.1016/S0140-6736(08)61687-6. PMID 18994661.
- Melhuish, E. C.; Phan, M. B.; Sylva, K.; Sammons, P.; Siraj-Blatchford, I.; Taggart, B. (2008). "Effects of the home learning environment and preschool center experience upon literacy and numeracy development in early primary school". Journal of Social Issues. 64 (1): 95–114. doi:10.1111/j.1540-4560.2008.00550.x.
- Melhuish, Edward; Gardiner, Julian (7 May 2019). "Structural Factors and Policy Change as Related to the Quality of Early Childhood Education and Care for 3–4 Year Olds in the UK". Frontiers in Education. 4 35. doi:10.3389/feduc.2019.00035.
