= Harry Judge =

Welsh academic (1928–2019)

Harry George Judge
- Born: 1 August 1928; Cardiff, Wales
- Died: 2 April 2019 (aged 90); Oxford, England
- Education: Cardiff High School
- Alma mater: Brasenose College, Oxford; University College London

Harry George Judge (1 August 1928 – 2 April 2019) was senior research fellow at the Department of Education, University of Oxford and emeritus fellow of Brasenose College, Oxford. He was director of the Department of Educational Studies from 1973 to 1988. His 80th birthday was marked by the publication of a special volume of the Oxford Review of Education. He was the honorary president of the Oxford Education Society.

Born in Cardiff, after two years in the Royal Air Force he studied at Brasenose College, taking degrees in Modern History and in Theology. While teaching in schools in London and Surrey he completed a Ph.D. in French history and in 1959 was invited to become director of studies at the St Katharine’s Foundation, Cumberland Lodge. In 1962, he was appointed Headmaster of Banbury Grammar School and coordinated its merger with three other secondary schools to form Banbury School (now Wykham Park Academy), of which he became the first principal.

While in Banbury, he was a member of the Public Schools Commissions and in 1970 of the James Committee of Enquiry into Teacher Education. In 1973, he was elected as director of the Oxford University Department of Educational Studies (later to be renamed the Department of Education) and a professorial fellow of Brasenose College. His work at Oxford focused on building a research partnership extending across the university and on integrating the university role with that of local schools in the professional education of teachers.

In the 1980s he chaired the BBC Schools Broadcasting Council and the Royal College of Nursing Commission on the education of nurses. He completed for the Ford Foundation a report on graduate schools of education in the United States, and on his retirement from his Oxford appointments became professor of teacher education policy at Michigan State University, subsequently serving as a senior scholar at the Carnegie Foundation for the Advancement of Teaching at Stanford University.

== Selected publications ==
- Oxford Illustrated (General Editor)
- Louis XIV, Longmans (1965)
- School Is Not Yet Dead, Prentice Hall (1974)
- Graduate Schools of Education in the US, Ford Foundation (1982)
- A Generation of Schooling: English secondary schools since 1944, Oxford (1984)
- The University and the Teachers: France, the United States, England, Symposium (1994)
- Faith-Based Schools and the State: Catholics in America, France and England (editor and contributor), Oxford Studies in Comparative Education, Symposium (2002)
- The University and Public Education: the contribution of Oxford, Routledge (2007)
