= List of regions of the United Kingdom by Human Development Index =

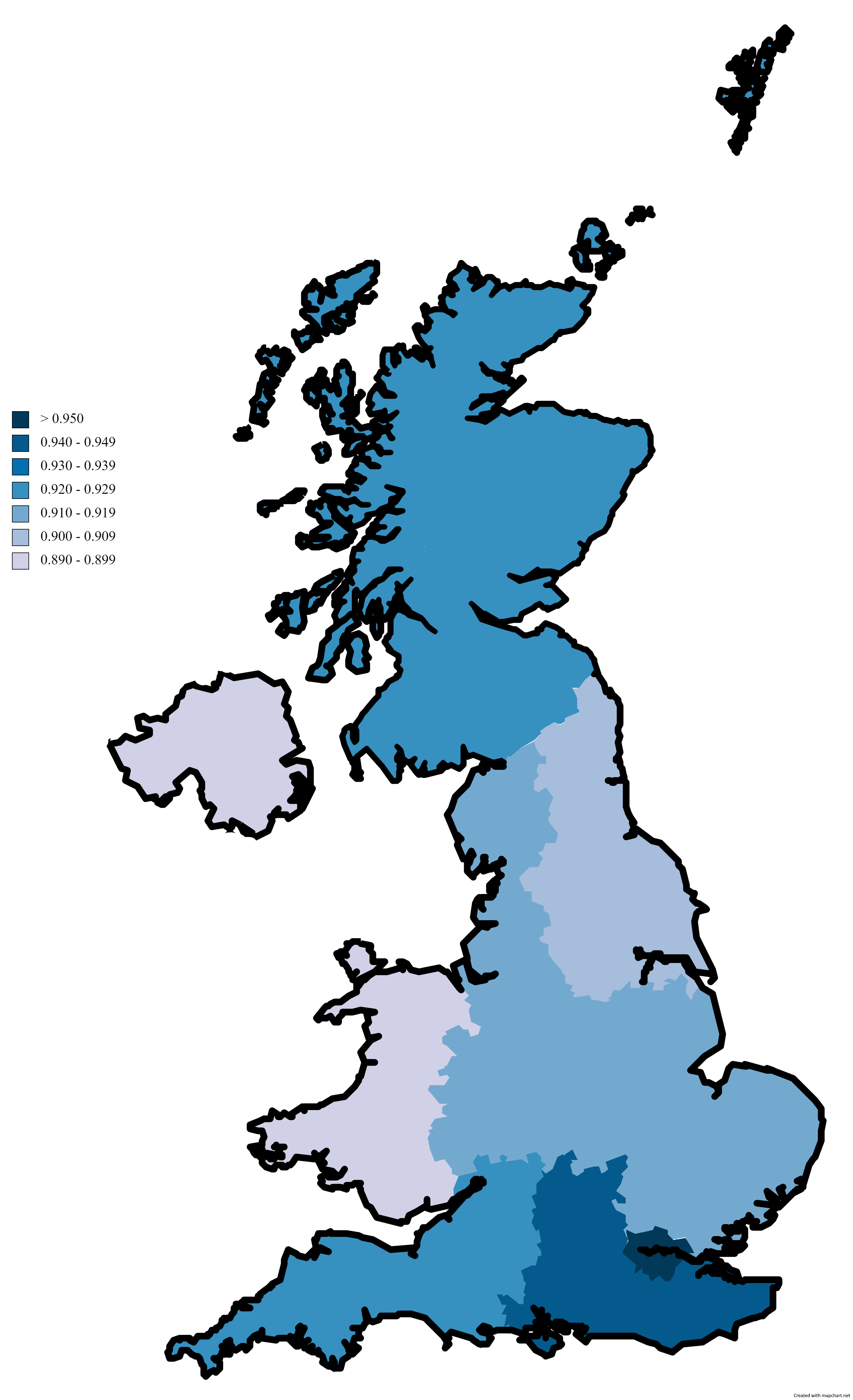
Map of the regions of the United Kingdom by HDI in 2021. Legend: > 0.950 0.940–0.949 0.930–0.939 0.920–0.929 0.910–0.919 0.900–0.909 0.890–0.899

This is a list of regions of the United Kingdom by Human Development Index as of 2023. The regions are ITL 1 statistical regions of the United Kingdom (formerly NUTS 1). The Human Development Index figures are calculated and published by the Global Data Lab.

ITL 1 statistical regions of the United Kingdom by Human Development Index (2023)
Rank	ITL 1 Region	HDI
1	(England) Greater London	0.982
2	South East England	0.960
–	United Kingdom (average)	0.946
3	South West England	0.942
4	Scotland	0.937
5	East of England	0.934
6	North West England	0.932
7	(England) East Midlands	0.931
8	(England) West Midlands	0.930
9	(England) Yorkshire and the Humber	0.926
10	North East England	0.916
11	Wales	0.915
12	Northern Ireland	0.913
