= International Territorial Level =

Geographic classification system in the United Kingdom

ITL 1 regions
- Also known as: NUTS 1 regions of the United Kingdom
- Category: Statistical regions
- Location: United Kingdom
- Created: 1994 (as NUTS 1)
- Number: 12 (as of 2010)
- Possible types: Region of England (9); Country of the United Kingdom (3)
- Populations: 1.8–9 million
- Subdivisions: ITL 2 regions

International Territorial Level (ITL) is a geocode standard for referencing the subdivisions of the United Kingdom for statistical purposes, used by the Office for National Statistics (ONS). From 2003 and until 2020 it functioned as part of the European Union and European Statistical System's geocode standard Nomenclature of Territorial Units for Statistics or NUTS.

Following Brexit, the ONS set to develop a domestic statistical classification framework separate from NUTS. Initially, the ITLs were a mirror to the pre-existing NUTS system, they retained the same three level hierarchy and boundaries used for NUTS in the United Kingdom from 2018. ITLs were set to follow a similar review timetable to NUTS, being reviewed every three years. The ONS developed new official GSS codes of ITL geography aligned with the existing NUTS codes. From 1 January 2021, the ONS encouraged "ITL" be used as a replacement to the "NUTS" designation, with lookups between NUTS and ITL maintained and published until 2023.

The current ITL classification since 2025, has 12 regions at ITLs 1, 46 at ITL 2 and 182 at ITL 3.

The first ITL classification in 2021, following Brexit, was a mirror of the previous NUTS classification with slight modification, the ONS listed 12 regions at ITL 1, 41 regions at ITL 2, and 179 regions at ITL 3. "UK" in the NUTS codes were replaced with "TL".

The last NUTS classification is dated 21 November 2016 and was effective from 1 January 2018, listed 12 regions at NUTS 1, 40 regions at NUTS 2, and 174 regions at NUTS 3 level.

== List of ITL regions ==
=== 2025 ===
The current ITL classification since 2025, has 12 regions at ITLs 1, 46 at ITL 2 and 182 at ITL 3.

==== Level 2 ====
2021 and 2025 Level 2 comparison
| 2021 | Code | 2025 |
|---|---|---|
| — | — | — |
| — | — | — |
| Tees Valley and Durham | TLC1 | — |
| Northumberland, and Tyne and Wear | TLC2 | — |
| — | TLC3 | Tees Valley |
| — | TLC4 | Northumberland, Durham and Tyne & Wear |
| Cumbria | TLD1 | Cumbria |
| Greater Manchester | TLD3 | Greater Manchester |
| Lancashire | TLD4 | Lancashire |
| Cheshire | TLD6 | Cheshire |
| Merseyside | TLD7 | Merseyside |
| East Yorkshire and Northern Lincolnshire | TLE1 | East Yorkshire and Northern Lincolnshire |
| North Yorkshire | TLE2 | North Yorkshire |
| South Yorkshire | TLE3 | South Yorkshire |
| West Yorkshire | TLE4 | West Yorkshire |
| Derbyshire and Nottinghamshire | TLF1 | Derbyshire and Nottinghamshire |
| Leicestershire, Rutland and Northamptonshire | TLF2 | Leicestershire, Rutland and Northamptonshire |
| Lincolnshire | TLF3 | Lincolnshire |
| Herefordshire, Worcestershire and Warwickshire | TLG1 | Herefordshire, Worcestershire and Warwickshire |
| Shropshire and Staffordshire | TLG2 | Shropshire and Staffordshire |
| West Midlands | TLG3 | West Midlands |
| East Anglia | TLH1 | — |
| Bedfordshire and Hertfordshire | TLH2 | Bedfordshire and Hertfordshire |
| Essex | TLH3 | Essex |
| — | TLH4 | Cambridgeshire and Peterborough |
| — | TLH5 | Norfolk |
| — | TLH6 | Suffolk |
| Inner London - West | TLI3 | Inner London - West |
| Inner London - East | TLI4 | Inner London - East |
| Outer London - East and North East | TLI5 | Outer London - East and North East |
| Outer London - South | TLI6 | Outer London - South |
| Outer London - West and North West | TLI7 | Outer London - West and North West |
| Berkshire, Buckinghamshire and Oxfordshire | TLJ1 | Berkshire, Buckinghamshire and Oxfordshire |
| Surrey, East and West Sussex | TLJ2 | Surrey, East and West Sussex |
| Hampshire and Isle of Wight | TLJ3 | Hampshire and Isle of Wight |
| Kent | TLJ4 | Kent |
| Gloucestershire, Wiltshire and Bath/Bristol area | TLK1 | — |
| Dorset and Somerset | TLK2 | — |
| Cornwall and Isles of Scilly | TLK3 | Cornwall and Isles of Scilly |
| Devon | TLK4 | Devon |
| — | TLK5 | West of England |
| — | TLK6 | North Somerset, Somerset and Dorset |
| — | TLK7 | Gloucestershire and Wiltshire |
| West Wales and The Valleys | TLL1 | — |
| East Wales | TLL2 | — |
| — | TLL3 | North Wales |
| — | TLL4 | Mid and South West Wales |
| — | TLL5 | South East Wales |
| — | TLM0 | Eastern Scotland |
| — | TLM1 | East Central Scotland |
| — | TLM2 | Highlands and Islands |
| — | TLM3 | West Central Scotland |
| North Eastern Scotland | TLM5 | North Eastern Scotland |
| Highlands and Islands | TLM6 | — |
| Eastern Scotland | TLM7 | — |
| West Central Scotland | TLM8 | — |
| Southern Scotland | TLM9 | Southern Scotland |
| Northern Ireland | TLN0 | Northern Ireland |

=== 2021 ITL ===
Following Brexit, the classification used by the ONS was replaced with ITLs. Between 2021 and the next review scheduled for 2024, the ITLs were a mirror of the NUTS classification adopted in 2018 (see below). All NUTS codes containing "UK" were changed to use "TL" for Territorial Level.

== Former NUTS regions ==
=== 2018 NUTS ===
| Level | Corresponding subdivisions | # |
|---|---|---|
| NUTS 1 | Wales, Scotland, Northern Ireland, 9 statistical regions in England | 12 |
| NUTS 2 | Northern Ireland, counties in England (most grouped), groups of districts in Greater London, groups of unitary authorities in Wales, groups of council areas in Scotland | 40 |
| NUTS 3 | counties, unitary authorities, or districts in England (some grouped), groups of unitary authorities in Wales, groups of council areas in Scotland, groups of districts in Northern Ireland | 174 |

=== 2016 NUTS ===
- UKM2 (Eastern Scotland) was replaced with UKM7 (Eastern Scotland) along with associated NUTS 3 areas
- UKM3 (South Western Scotland) was replaced with UKM8 (West Central Scotland) and UKM9 (Southern Scotland)

=== 2015 NUTS ===
| NUTS 1 | Code | NUTS 2 | Code | NUTS 3 | Code |
|---|---|---|---|---|---|
| North East, England | UKC | Tees Valley and Durham | UKC1 | Hartlepool and Stockton-on-Tees | UKC11 |
| | | Tees Valley and Durham | UKC1 | South Teesside (Middlesbrough and Redcar and Cleveland) | UKC12 |
| | | Tees Valley and Durham | UKC1 | Darlington | UKC13 |
| | | Tees Valley and Durham | UKC1 | County Durham | UKC14 |
| | | Northumberland and Tyne and Wear | UKC2 | Northumberland | UKC21 |
| | | Northumberland and Tyne and Wear | UKC2 | Tyneside (Newcastle upon Tyne, Gateshead, South Tyneside, North Tyneside) | UKC22 |
| | | Northumberland and Tyne and Wear | UKC2 | Sunderland | UKC23 |
| North West, England | UKD | Cumbria | UKD1 | West Cumbria (Allerdale, Barrow-in-Furness, Copeland) | UKD11 |
| | | Cumbria | UKD1 | East Cumbria (Carlisle, Eden, South Lakeland) | UKD12 |
| | | Cheshire | UKD6 | Warrington | UKD61 |
| | | Cheshire | UKD6 | Cheshire East | UKD62 |
| | | Cheshire | UKD6 | Cheshire West and Chester | UKD63 |
| | | Greater Manchester | UKD3 | Manchester | UKD33 |
| | | Greater Manchester | UKD3 | Greater Manchester South West (Salford and Trafford) | UKD34 |
| | | Greater Manchester | UKD3 | Greater Manchester South East (Stockport and Tameside) | UKD35 |
| | | Greater Manchester | UKD3 | Greater Manchester North West (Bolton and Wigan) | UKD36 |
| | | Greater Manchester | UKD3 | Greater Manchester North East (Bury, Oldham and Rochdale) | UKD37 |
| | | Lancashire | UKD4 | Blackburn with Darwen | UKD41 |
| | | Lancashire | UKD4 | Blackpool | UKD42 |
| | | Lancashire | UKD4 | Lancaster and Wyre | UKD44 |
| | | Lancashire | UKD4 | Mid Lancashire (Fylde, Preston, Ribble Valley and South Ribble) | UKD45 |
| | | Lancashire | UKD4 | East Lancashire (Burnley, Hyndburn, Pendle and Rossendale) | UKD46 |
| | | Lancashire | UKD4 | Chorley and West Lancashire | UKD47 |
| | | Merseyside | UKD7 | East Merseyside (Knowsley, St Helens and Halton) | UKD71 |
| | | Merseyside | UKD7 | Liverpool | UKD72 |
| | | Merseyside | UKD7 | Sefton | UKD73 |
| | | Merseyside | UKD7 | Wirral | UKD74 |
| Yorkshire and the Humber, England | UKE | East Riding and North Lincolnshire | UKE1 | Kingston upon Hull | UKE11 |
| | | East Riding and North Lincolnshire | UKE1 | East Riding of Yorkshire | UKE12 |
| | | East Riding and North Lincolnshire | UKE1 | North and North East Lincolnshire | UKE13 |
| | | North Yorkshire | UKE2 | York | UKE21 |
| | | North Yorkshire | UKE2 | North Yorkshire CC | UKE22 |
| | | South Yorkshire | UKE3 | Barnsley, Doncaster and Rotherham | UKE31 |
| | | South Yorkshire | UKE3 | Sheffield | UKE32 |
| | | West Yorkshire | UKE4 | Bradford | UKE41 |
| | | West Yorkshire | UKE4 | Leeds | UKE42 |
| | | West Yorkshire | UKE4 | Calderdale and Kirklees | UKE44 |
| | | West Yorkshire | UKE4 | Wakefield | UKE45 |
| East Midlands, England | UKF | Derbyshire and Nottinghamshire | UKF1 | Derby | UKF11 |
| | | Derbyshire and Nottinghamshire | UKF1 | East Derbyshire (Bolsover, Chesterfield, North East Derbyshire) | UKF12 |
| | | Derbyshire and Nottinghamshire | UKF1 | South and West Derbyshire (Amber Valley, Derbyshire Dales, Erewash, High Peak, South Derbyshire) | UKF13 |
| | | Derbyshire and Nottinghamshire | UKF1 | Nottingham | UKF14 |
| | | Derbyshire and Nottinghamshire | UKF1 | North Nottinghamshire (Ashfield, Bassetlaw, Mansfield, Newark and Sherwood) | UKF15 |
| | | Derbyshire and Nottinghamshire | UKF1 | South Nottinghamshire (Broxtowe, Gedling, Rushcliffe) | UKF16 |
| | | Leicestershire, Rutland and Northamptonshire | UKF2 | Leicester | UKF21 |
| | | Leicestershire, Rutland and Northamptonshire | UKF2 | Leicestershire CC and Rutland | UKF22 |
| | | Leicestershire, Rutland and Northamptonshire | UKF2 | West Northamptonshire (Northampton, Daventry and South Northamptonshire) | UKF24 |
| | | Leicestershire, Rutland and Northamptonshire | UKF2 | North Northamptonshire (East Northamptonshire, Corby, Wellingborough and Kettering) | UKF25 |
| | | Lincolnshire | UKF3 | Lincolnshire CC | UKF30 |
| West Midlands, England | UKG | Herefordshire, Worcestershire and Warwickshire | UKG1 | Herefordshire | UKG11 |
| | | Herefordshire, Worcestershire and Warwickshire | UKG1 | Worcestershire CC | UKG12 |
| | | Herefordshire, Worcestershire and Warwickshire | UKG1 | Warwickshire CC | UKG13 |
| | | Shropshire and Staffordshire | UKG2 | Telford and Wrekin | UKG21 |
| | | Shropshire and Staffordshire | UKG2 | Shropshire | UKG22 |
| | | Shropshire and Staffordshire | UKG2 | Stoke-on-Trent | UKG23 |
| | | Shropshire and Staffordshire | UKG2 | Staffordshire CC | UKG24 |
| | | West Midlands | UKG3 | Birmingham | UKG31 |
| | | West Midlands | UKG3 | Solihull | UKG32 |
| | | West Midlands | UKG3 | Coventry | UKG33 |
| | | West Midlands | UKG3 | Dudley | UKG36 |
| | | West Midlands | UKG3 | Sandwell | UKG37 |
| | | West Midlands | UKG3 | Walsall | UKG38 |
| | | West Midlands | UKG3 | Wolverhampton | UKG39 |
| East of England | UKH | East Anglia | UKH1 | Peterborough | UKH11 |
| | | East Anglia | UKH1 | Cambridgeshire CC | UKH12 |
| | | East Anglia | UKH1 | Suffolk | UKH14 |
| | | East Anglia | UKH1 | Norwich and East Norfolk (Broadland and Great Yarmouth) | UKH15 |
| | | East Anglia | UKH1 | North and West Norfolk | UKH16 |
| | | East Anglia | UKH1 | Breckland and South Norfolk | UKH17 |
| | | Bedfordshire and Hertfordshire | UKH2 | Luton | UKH21 |
| | | Bedfordshire and Hertfordshire | UKH2 | Bedford | UKH24 |
| | | Bedfordshire and Hertfordshire | UKH2 | Central Bedfordshire | UKH25 |
| | | Bedfordshire and Hertfordshire | UKH2 | Hertfordshire | UKH23 |
| | | Essex | UKH3 | Southend-on-Sea | UKH31 |
| | | Essex | UKH3 | Thurrock | UKH32 |
| | | Essex | UKH3 | Essex Haven Gateway (Braintree, Colchester and Tendring) | UKH34 |
| | | Essex | UKH3 | West Essex (Epping Forest, Harlow and Uttlesford) | UKH35 |
| | | Essex | UKH3 | Heart of Essex (Brentwood, Chelmsford and Maldon) | UKH36 |
| | | Essex | UKH3 | Essex Thames Gateway (Basildon, Castle Point and Rochford) | UKH37 |
| London, England | UKI | Inner London - West | UKI3 | Camden and City of London | UKI31 |
| | | Inner London - West | UKI3 | Westminster | UKI32 |
| | | Inner London - West | UKI3 | Hammersmith and Fulham and Kensington and Chelsea | UKI33 |
| | | Inner London - West | UKI3 | Wandsworth | UKI34 |
| | | Inner London - East | UKI4 | Hackney and Newham | UKI41 |
| | | Inner London - East | UKI4 | Tower Hamlets | UKI42 |
| | | Inner London - East | UKI4 | Haringey and Islington | UKI43 |
| | | Inner London - East | UKI4 | Lewisham and Southwark | UKI44 |
| | | Inner London - East | UKI4 | Lambeth | UKI45 |
| | | Outer London - East and North East | UKI5 | Bexley and Greenwich | UKI51 |
| | | Outer London - East and North East | UKI5 | Barking & Dagenham and Havering | UKI52 |
| | | Outer London - East and North East | UKI5 | Redbridge and Waltham Forest | UKI53 |
| | | Outer London - East and North East | UKI5 | Enfield | UKI54 |
| | | Outer London - South | UKI6 | Bromley | UKI61 |
| | | Outer London - South | UKI6 | Croydon | UKI62 |
| | | Outer London - South | UKI6 | Merton, Kingston upon Thames and Sutton | UKI63 |
| | | Outer London - West and North West | UKI7 | Barnet | UKI71 |
| | | Outer London - West and North West | UKI7 | Brent | UKI72 |
| | | Outer London - West and North West | UKI7 | Ealing | UKI73 |
| | | Outer London - West and North West | UKI7 | Harrow and Hillingdon | UKI74 |
| | | Outer London - West and North West | UKI7 | Hounslow and Richmond upon Thames | UKI75 |
| South East, England | UKJ | Berkshire, Buckinghamshire, and Oxfordshire | UKJ1 | Berkshire | UKJ11 |
| | | Berkshire, Buckinghamshire, and Oxfordshire | UKJ1 | Milton Keynes | UKJ12 |
| | | Berkshire, Buckinghamshire, and Oxfordshire | UKJ1 | Buckinghamshire CC | UKJ13 |
| | | Berkshire, Buckinghamshire, and Oxfordshire | UKJ1 | Oxfordshire | UKJ14 |
| | | Surrey, East and West Sussex | UKJ2 | Brighton and Hove | UKJ21 |
| | | Surrey, East and West Sussex | UKJ2 | East Sussex CC | UKJ22 |
| | | Surrey, East and West Sussex | UKJ2 | West Surrey (Elmbridge, Guildford, Runnymede, Spelthorne, Surrey Heath, Waverley and Woking) | UKJ25 |
| | | Surrey, East and West Sussex | UKJ2 | East Surrey (Epsom and Ewell, Mole Valley, Reigate and Banstead and Tandridge) | UKJ26 |
| | | Surrey, East and West Sussex | UKJ2 | West Sussex (South West) - (Adur, Arun, Chichester and Worthing) | UKJ27 |
| | | Surrey, East and West Sussex | UKJ2 | West Sussex (North East) - (Crawley, Horsham and Mid Sussex) | UKJ28 |
| | | Hampshire and Isle of Wight | UKJ3 | Portsmouth | UKJ31 |
| | | Hampshire and Isle of Wight | UKJ3 | Southampton | UKJ32 |
| | | Hampshire and Isle of Wight | UKJ3 | Isle of Wight | UKJ34 |
| | | Hampshire and Isle of Wight | UKJ3 | South Hampshire (Eastleigh, Fareham, Gosport and Havant) | UKJ35 |
| | | Hampshire and Isle of Wight | UKJ3 | Central Hampshire (East Hampshire, New Forest, Test Valley and Winchester) | UKJ36 |
| | | Hampshire and Isle of Wight | UKJ3 | North Hampshire (Basingstoke and Deane, Hart and Rushmoor) | UKJ37 |
| | | Kent | UKJ4 | Medway | UKJ41 |
| | | Kent | UKJ4 | Kent Thames Gateway (Dartford, Gravesham and Swale) | UKJ43 |
| | | Kent | UKJ4 | East Kent (Canterbury, Dover, Folkestone and Hythe and Thanet) | UKJ44 |
| | | Kent | UKJ4 | Mid Kent (Ashford and Maidstone) | UKJ45 |
| | | Kent | UKJ4 | West Kent (Sevenoaks, Tonbridge and Malling and Tunbridge Wells) | UKJ46 |
| South West, England | UKK | Gloucestershire, Wiltshire and Bristol/Bath area | UKK1 | Bristol | UKK11 |
| | | Gloucestershire, Wiltshire and Bristol/Bath area | UKK1 | Bath and North East Somerset, North Somerset and South Gloucestershire | UKK12 |
| | | Gloucestershire, Wiltshire and Bristol/Bath area | UKK1 | Gloucestershire CC | UKK13 |
| | | Gloucestershire, Wiltshire and Bristol/Bath area | UKK1 | Swindon | UKK14 |
| | | Gloucestershire, Wiltshire and Bristol/Bath area | UKK1 | Wiltshire | UKK15 |
| | | Dorset and Somerset | UKK2 | Bournemouth and Poole | UKK21 |
| | | Dorset and Somerset | UKK2 | Dorset CC | UKK22 |
| | | Dorset and Somerset | UKK2 | Somerset | UKK23 |
| | | Cornwall and Isles of Scilly | UKK3 | Cornwall and Isles of Scilly | UKK30 |
| | | Devon | UKK4 | Plymouth | UKK41 |
| | | Devon | UKK4 | Torbay | UKK42 |
| | | Devon | UKK4 | Devon CC | UKK43 |
| Wales | UKL | West Wales and the Valleys | UKL1 | Isle of Anglesey | UKL11 |
| | | West Wales and the Valleys | UKL1 | Gwynedd | UKL12 |
| | | West Wales and the Valleys | UKL1 | Conwy and Denbighshire | UKL13 |
| | | West Wales and the Valleys | UKL1 | South West Wales (Ceredigion, Carmarthenshire, Pembrokeshire) | UKL14 |
| | | West Wales and the Valleys | UKL1 | Central Valleys (Merthyr Tydfil, Rhondda Cynon Taff) | UKL15 |
| | | West Wales and the Valleys | UKL1 | Gwent Valleys (Blaenau Gwent, Caerphilly, Torfaen) | UKL16 |
| | | West Wales and the Valleys | UKL1 | Bridgend and Neath Port Talbot | UKL17 |
| | | West Wales and the Valleys | UKL1 | Swansea | UKL18 |
| | | East Wales | UKL2 | Monmouthshire and Newport | UKL21 |
| | | East Wales | UKL2 | Cardiff and Vale of Glamorgan | UKL22 |
| | | East Wales | UKL2 | Flintshire and Wrexham | UKL23 |
| | | East Wales | UKL2 | Powys | UKL24 |
| Scotland | UKM | Eastern Scotland | UKM2 | Angus and Dundee | UKM21 |
| | | Eastern Scotland | UKM2 | Clackmannanshire and Fife | UKM22 |
| | | Eastern Scotland | UKM2 | East Lothian and Midlothian | UKM23 |
| | | Eastern Scotland | UKM2 | Scottish Borders | UKM24 |
| | | Eastern Scotland | UKM2 | Edinburgh | UKM25 |
| | | Eastern Scotland | UKM2 | Falkirk | UKM26 |
| | | Eastern Scotland | UKM2 | Perth and Kinross, and Stirling | UKM27 |
| | | Eastern Scotland | UKM2 | West Lothian | UKM28 |
| | | South Western Scotland | UKM3 | East Dunbartonshire, West Dunbartonshire, and Helensburgh and Lomond | UKM31 |
| | | South Western Scotland | UKM3 | Dumfries and Galloway | UKM32 |
| | | South Western Scotland | UKM3 | East and North Ayrshire mainland | UKM33 |
| | | South Western Scotland | UKM3 | Glasgow | UKM34 |
| | | South Western Scotland | UKM3 | Inverclyde, East Renfrewshire, and Renfrewshire | UKM35 |
| | | South Western Scotland | UKM3 | North Lanarkshire | UKM36 |
| | | South Western Scotland | UKM3 | South Ayrshire | UKM37 |
| | | South Western Scotland | UKM3 | South Lanarkshire | UKM38 |
| | | North Eastern Scotland | UKM5 | Aberdeen and Aberdeenshire | UKM50 |
| | | Highlands and Islands | UKM6 | Caithness and Sutherland, and Ross and Cromarty | UKM61 |
| | | Highlands and Islands | UKM6 | Inverness, Nairn, Moray, and Badenoch and Strathspey | UKM62 |
| | | Highlands and Islands | UKM6 | Lochaber, Skye and Lochalsh, Arran and Cumbrae, and Argyll and Bute (except Helensburgh and Lomond) | UKM63 |
| | | Highlands and Islands | UKM6 | Eilean Siar (Western Isles) | UKM64 |
| | | Highlands and Islands | UKM6 | Orkney Islands | UKM65 |
| | | Highlands and Islands | UKM6 | Shetland Islands | UKM66 |
| Northern Ireland | UKN | Northern Ireland | UKN0 | Belfast | UKN01 |
| | | Northern Ireland | UKN0 | Outer Belfast (Carrickfergus, Castlereagh, Lisburn, Newtownabbey, North Down) | UKN02 |
| | | Northern Ireland | UKN0 | East of Northern Ireland (Antrim, Ards, Ballymena, Banbridge, Craigavon, Down, Larne) | UKN03 |
| | | Northern Ireland | UKN0 | North of Northern Ireland (Ballymoney, Coleraine, Derry, Limavady, Moyle, Strabane) | UKN04 |
| | | Northern Ireland | UKN0 | West and South of Northern Ireland (Armagh, Cookstown, Dungannon, Fermanagh, Magherafelt, Newry and Mourne, Omagh) | UKN05 |
| Extra-regio NUTS 1 | UKZ | Extra-regio NUTS 2 | UKZZ | Extra-regio NUTS 3 | UKZZZ |

=== 2013 NUTS ===
NUTS 2013 came into force on 1 January 2015.

2015 changes to NUTS 3 areas without changes to NUTS 2 areas:

- UKJ42 (Kent CC) was replaced by UKJ43 (Kent Thames Gateway) UKJ44 (East Kent) UKJ45 (Mid Kent) UKJ46 (West Kent)
- UKJ23 (Surrey) was replaced by UKJ25 (West Surrey) and UKJ26 (East Surrey)
- UKJ24 (West Sussex) was replaced by UKJ27 (West Sussex South West) and UKJ28 (West Sussex North East)
- UKJ33 (Hampshire CC) was replaced by UKJ35 (South Hampshire), UKJ36 (Central Hampshire), UKJ37 (North Hampshire)
- UKD43 (Lancashire CC) was replaced by UKD44 (Lancaster and Wyre), UKD45 (Mid Lancashire), UKD46 (East Lancashire) and UKD47 (Chorley and West Lancashire)
- UKD31 (Greater Manchester South) was replaced by UKD33 (Manchester), UKD34 (Greater Manchester South West) and UKD35 (Greater Manchester South East)
- UKD32 (Greater Manchester North) was replaced by UKD36 (Greater Manchester North West) and UKD37 (Greater Manchester North East)
- UKH13 (Norfolk) was replaced by UKH15 (Norwich and East Norfolk), UKH16 (North and West Norfolk) and UKH17 (Breckland and South Norfolk)
- UKH33 (Essex CC) was replaced by UKH34 (Essex Haven Gateway), UKH35 (West Essex), UKH36 (Heart of Essex) and UKH37 (Essex Thames Gateway)

In 2015 the Greater London NUTS 1 area was left unchanged however the previous NUTS 2 area of inner and outer London were abolished and with the previous NUTS 3 areas becoming NUTS 2 areas. Thus NUTS 2 of Inner London West UKI11 becoming the NUTS 3 area of UKI3 and likewise: Inner London East (from UKI12 to UKI4), Outer London East and North East (from UKI21 to UKI5), Outer London South (from UKI22 to UKI6) and Outer London West and North West (from UKI23 to UKI7). The NUTS 3 areas were now a single or a group of two or three boroughs.

=== 2010 NUTS ===
NUTS 2010 came into force on 1 January 2012.

2010 changes to NUTS 2 also resulting in changes with NUTS 3 regions

- The combined area of UKD2 (Cheshire pre-2010) and UKD5 (Merseyside pre-2010) were replaced by UKD6 (Cheshire post-2010) and UKD7 (Merseyside post-2010), due to the transfer of Halton to the Merseyside NUTS region from Cheshire. This resulted in the following changes to the underlying NUTS 3 areas: UKD22 (Cheshire CC) being split into UKD62 (Cheshire East) and UKD63 (Cheshire West and Chester); The areas of Liverpool, Sefton and Wirral were not changed as NUTS 3 areas however to reflect their transfer within NUTS 2 areas were respectively renumbered from (UKD52 to UKD72; UKD53 to UKD 73 and UKD54 to UKD 74). The two areas of UKD51 (East Merseyside pre 2010) and UKD21 (Halton and Warrington) were amended by the transfer of Halton from the latter to former to form the new areas of UKD71 (East Merseyside post-2010) and UKD61 (Warrington).

2010 changes to NUTS 3 areas without changes occurring to NUTS 2 areas

- UKE43 (Calderdale, Kirklees and Wakefield) was replaced by UKE44 (Calderdale and Kirklees) and UKE45 (Wakefield)
- UKF23 (Northamptonshire) was replaced by UKF24 (West Northamptonshire) and UKF25 (North Northamptonshire)
- UKG34 (Dudley and Sandwell) was replaced by UKG36 (Dudley) and UKG37 (Sandwell)
- UKG35 (Walsall and Wolverhampton) was replaced by UKG38 (Walsall) and UKG39 (Wolverhampton).
- Bedfordshire CC UKH22 was replaced by UKH24 (Bedford) and UKH25 (Central Bedfordshire)

=== 2006 NUTS ===
NUTS 2006 came into force on 1 January 2008.

=== 2003 NUTS ===
In the first version in 2003, North Eastern Scotland (which then included part of Moray) was coded UKM1, and Highlands and Islands was coded UKM4.

The codes in this scheme start with "UKC" to avoid confusion with codes in the previous system, which identified 11 regions of England using codes that started with "UK1" through "UK9" plus "UKA" and "UKB".

== Demographic statistics by ITL 1 region ==
The 12 ITL regions of the United Kingdom are listed below. Population numbers are for mid-2019 (as NUTS 1), and areas are in square kilometres. Data is from the Office for National Statistics.

| ITL 1 region | Population | Area (km2) |
|---|---|---|
| East Midlands | 4,835,928 | 15,623 |
| East of England | 6,236,072 | 19,119 |
| Greater London | 8,961,989 | 1,572 |
| Northern Ireland | 1,893,667 | 13,793 |
| North East England | 2,669,941 | 8,574 |
| North West England | 7,341,196 | 14,107 |
| Scotland | 5,463,300 | 77,911 |
| South East England | 9,180,135 | 19,072 |
| South West England | 5,624,696 | 23,837 |
| Wales | 3,152,879 | 20,736 |
| West Midlands | 5,934,037 | 12,998 |
| Yorkshire and the Humber | 5,502,967 | 15,405 |
| United Kingdom | 66,796,807 | 242,749 |

== Local administrative units ==
Below the ITL levels, the two LAU (Local Administrative Units) levels are:

| Level | Subdivisions | # |
|---|---|---|
| LAU 1 | Lower tier authorities (districts) or individual unitary authorities (England and Wales); Individual unitary authorities or LECs (or parts thereof) (Scotland); Districts (Northern Ireland) | 415 |
| LAU 2 | Wards (or parts thereof) | 10400 |

The two LAU levels are maintained by the UK Office for National Statistics within the ONS coding system.

The LAU codes of the United Kingdom can be downloaded here:

== See also ==
ITL 2 regions (until 2025)
- Also known as: NUTS 2 regions of the United Kingdom
- Category: Statistical regions
- Location: United Kingdom
- Found in: ITL 1 regions
- Number: 40 (as of 2015)
- Subdivisions: ITL 3 regions

- Subdivisions of the United Kingdom
- List of regions of the United Kingdom by Human Development Index
- ISO 3166-2 codes of the United Kingdom
- FIPS region codes of the United Kingdom

== Sources ==
- Metadata Download NUTS (Nomenclature of Territorial Units for Statistics), by regional level (NUTS) accessed 11 June 2012
- Overview map of EU Countries – NUTS level 1
  - UNITED KINGDOM – NUTS level 2
  - UNITED KINGDOM Center North – NUTS level 3
  - UNITED KINGDOM Center South – NUTS level 3
  - UNITED KINGDOM North – NUTS level 3
  - UNITED KINGDOM South – NUTS level 3
- Correspondence between the NUTS levels and the national administrative units
- List of current NUTS codes
  - Download current NUTS codes (ODS format)
- Divisions of the United Kingdom, Statoids.com
- Listings of subdivisions of NUTS / LAU areas, Office for National Statistics, accessed 6 September 2012
