= Outer London =

Outer boroughs of Greater London

- Statutory definition

- Statistical definition
- Sovereign state: United Kingdom
- Country: England
- Region: London
- Administrative area: Greater London

Area
  - Total: 484 sq mi (1,253 km^{2})

Population (2021 Census)
  - Total: 5,395,500
  - Density: 11,150/sq mi (4,306/km^{2})
- NUTS: UKI2

Outer London is the group of London boroughs that form a ring around Inner London. Together, the inner and outer boroughs form London, the capital city of the United Kingdom. The population at the 2021 Census was 5,395,500, which means over 60% of the population of Greater London lives in Outer London.

== History ==
Outer London consists of areas that were not part of the County of London and became formally part of London when Greater London was created 1965. An exception is North Woolwich, which was in the County of London but was transferred to Newham in 1965.

== London Government Act 1963 ==
The nineteen Outer London boroughs were defined by the London Government Act 1963. The main difference between Inner and Outer London boroughs between 1965 and 1990 was that the outer boroughs were local education authorities. The statutory Outer London boroughs are:

- Barking and Dagenham
- Barnet
- Bexley
- Brent
- Bromley
- Croydon
- Ealing
- Enfield
- Haringey
- Harrow
- Havering
- Hillingdon
- Hounslow
- Kingston upon Thames
- Merton
- Redbridge
- Richmond upon Thames
- Sutton
- Waltham Forest

== ONS definition (statistics) ==
Outer London population pyramid in 2021

The Office for National Statistics and the decennial UK Census use a different definition of Outer London, excluding Haringey and Newham (which are defined as Inner London), and including Greenwich. This is reflected in the Nomenclature of Territorial Units for Statistics (NUTS) classification. Under this classification, Outer London consists of the nineteen London boroughs of Barking and Dagenham, Barnet, Bexley, Brent, Bromley, Croydon, Ealing, Enfield, Greenwich, Harrow, Havering, Hillingdon, Hounslow, Kingston upon Thames, Merton, Redbridge, Richmond upon Thames, Sutton, and Waltham Forest.

=== Population ===
Historical population
| Year | Population |
|---|---|
| 1891 | 1,083,770 |
| 1901 | 1,647,396 |
| 1911 | 2,162,288 |
| 1921 | 2,413,978 |
| 1931 | 3,217,219 |
| 1939 | 4,250,788 |
| 1951 | 4,517,588 |
| 1961 | 4,499,737 |
| 1971 | 4,420,585 |
| 1981 | 4,254,900 |
| 1991 | 4,230,000 |
| 2001 | 4,463,100 |
| 2011 | 4,942,040 |
| 2021 | 5,395,500 |

Figures here are for the Office for National Statistics defined Outer London (in its 2001 limits), whose land area is 1,254 km^{2} (484 sq mi). Figures before 1971 have been reconstructed by the Office for National Statistics based on past censuses in order to fit the 2001 limits.

Outer London continued to grow as population moved from Inner London, surpassing the Inner London population in 1951 at 4,517,588. The population of Greater London as a whole then started to decline, and the Outer London population fell from the 1951 peak to 4,230,000 in 1991. Since 1991 the Outer London population has been increasing again, surpassing the 1951 peak with a population of 4,942,040 in 2011. The population at the 2021 Census was 5,395,500. Over 60% of the population of Greater London lives in Outer London.

=== Economy ===
In 2002 there were 1.64 million jobs located in Outer London, which accounted for 42% of total jobs in London. Heathrow Airport and Croydon are the most significant locations for employment in Outer London.

=== Ethnicity ===
| Ethnic Group | Year | | | |
| Ethnic Group | 1981 estimations | | 1991 census | |
| Ethnic Group | Number | % | Number | % |
| White: Total | 3,821,141 | 89.8% | 3,534,783 | 82.9% |
|---|---|---|---|---|
| White: British | – | – | – | – |
| White: Irish | – | – | – | – |
| White: Gypsy or Irish Traveller | – | – | – | – |
| White: Roma | – | – | – | – |
| White: Other | – | – | – | – |
| Asian or Asian British: Total | 263,610 | 6.2% | 457,755 | 10.7% |
| Asian or Asian British: Indian | 172,715 | 4.1% | 283,286 | 6.7% |
| Asian or Asian British: Pakistani | 36,710 | 0.8% | 60,723 | 1.4% |
| Asian or Asian British: Bangladeshi | 6,778 | | 15,122 | |
| Asian or Asian British: Chinese | 16,556 | | 29,030 | |
| Asian or Asian British: Other Asian | 30,851 | | 69,594 | |
| Black or Black British: Total | 131,883 | 3.1% | 205,299 | 4.8% |
| Black or Black British: African | 31,361 | | 56,463 | |
| Black or Black British: Caribbean | 78,534 | 1.8% | 116,359 | 2.7% |
| Black or Black British: Other Black | 21,988 | | 32,477 | |
| Mixed or British Mixed: Total | – | – | – | – |
| Mixed: White and Black Caribbean | – | – | – | – |
| Mixed: White and Black African | – | – | – | – |
| Mixed: White and Asian | – | – | – | – |
| Mixed: Other Mixed | – | – | – | – |
| Other: Total | 38,861 | 0.9% | 64,858 | 1.5% |
| Other: Arab | – | – | – | – |
| Other: Any other ethnic group | – | – | | |
| Non-White: Total | 434,360 | 10.2% | 727,917 | 17.1% |
| Total | 4,255,501 | 100% | 4,262,700 | 100% |

== Strategic planning ==
For the purposes of the London Plan planning document produced by the Mayor of London, Outer London consists of the statutory Outer London boroughs, with the exception of Newham.

== Other definitions ==
From 1990 to 2000 London used two telephone area codes with separate codes for 'Inner London' and 'Outer London' (originally 071 and 081 respectively, becoming 0171 and 0181 in 1995). The area covered by the 'Outer London' code was widely different from all of the above definitions. In 2000, London returned to using a single 020 area code and all official distinctions between 'inner' and 'outer' London numbers ceased at this time.

== See also ==
- Central London
- East London
- Inner London
- North London
- South London
- West London
