= Local enterprise company =

A local enterprise company (LEC) was a public-sector organisation in Scotland with responsibility for local economic development activities. The LECs formed part of the two enterprise networks, Scottish Enterprise and Highlands and Islands Enterprise. The 22 LECs were abolished in September 2007 and replaced with enterprise regions (ERs).

== Highlands and Islands Enterprise LECs ==
- Argyll and the Islands Enterprise (AIE), covering most of Argyll and Bute (excluding the Helensburgh area), plus Arran, Great Cumbrae and Little Cumbrae
- Caithness and Sutherland Enterprise (CASE)
- Inverness, Nairn, Badenoch and Strathspey Enterprise (INBSE)
- Lochaber Enterprise
- HIE Moray
- Orkney Enterprise
- Ross and Cromarty Enterprise (RACE)
- Skye and Lochalsh Enterprise (SALE)
- Shetland Enterprise
- Western Isles Enterprise (WIE)

== Scottish Enterprise LECs ==
Previously autonomous, the Scottish Enterprise LECs were fully integrated into the main organisation, and acted as branch offices in the following areas:

- Ayrshire
- Borders
- Dumfries and Galloway
- Dunbartonshire
- Edinburgh and Lothian
- Fife
- Forth Valley
- Glasgow
- Grampian
- Lanarkshire
- Renfrewshire
- Tayside
