= Department of Education, University of Oxford =

Coordinates: 51.763640°N 1.255490°W

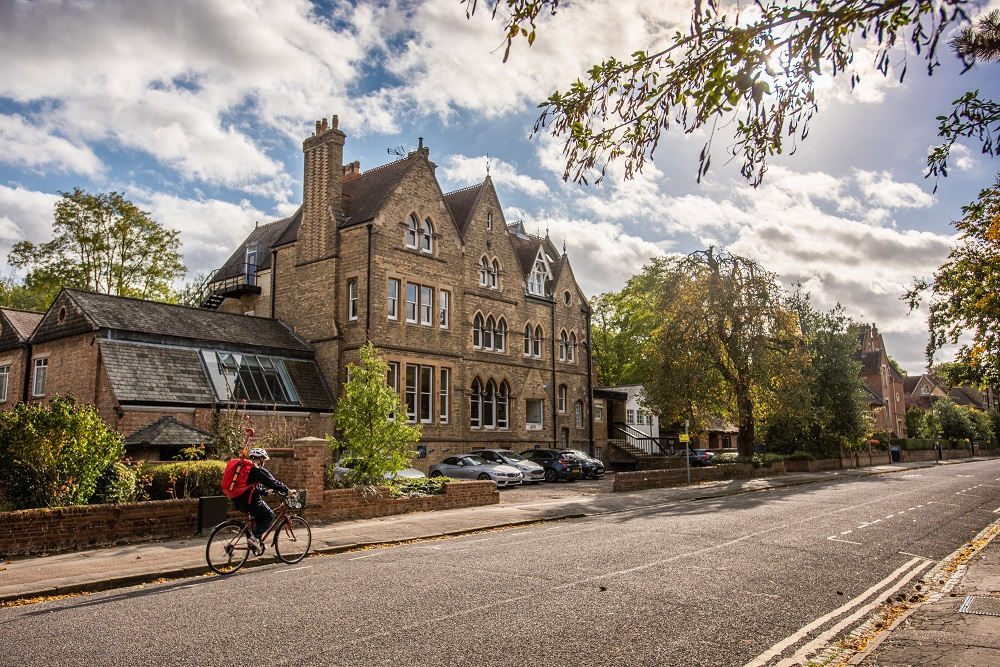
- The Department of Education in Norham Gardens.
- Formation: 1919
- Website: www.education.ox.ac.uk

Based at Norham Gardens in Oxford, the Department of Education at the University of Oxford is part of the Social Sciences Division.

== History ==
An early history of the department was written by Leila Tomlinson and published in the British Journal of Educational Studies in 1968. The history describes how the University of Oxford first entered the field of teacher training in 1892 and established a Diploma in Education course in 1896. In 1919, a statute was passed creating a University Department for the Training of Teachers under a directorship. In 1921, the department moved to Norham Gardens, where it continues to be based.

Former director Alec Peterson subsequently served as the first director general of the International Baccalaureate Organization and was involved in the development of its educational philosophy. Another former director, Harry Judge, served as a member of the James Committee, which reported on the reorganisation of teacher education in 1972. In 1975, Judge formed the Oxford Education Research Group, whose membership included representatives from university faculties, the local education authority and local schools.

== Rankings and assessments ==
In the 2024 Times Higher Education subject rankings, the University of Oxford was ranked third worldwide and first in the United Kingdom for education.

In the 2021 Research Excellence Framework, 69 per cent of Oxford's overall profile in the Education unit of assessment was rated 4*, described by the REF as “world-leading”.

The university's secondary initial teacher education provision has received an “Outstanding” rating in Ofsted inspections since 2005, including its most recent inspection in 2024. Ofsted's then Chief Inspector, Amanda Spielman, spoke at the department in 2023 about Ofsted's use of research and its wider use in the education sector.

== Research and themes ==
Research at the department is organised around three themes: Language, Cognition and Development; Policy, Economy and Society; and Pedagogy, Learning and Knowledge.

The department has a number of research centres. In June 2024, it announced the establishment of a centre intended to support the learning and teaching of Chinese in the United Kingdom.

== Teaching and courses ==
The department offers postgraduate courses, including DPhil, MSc and PGCE programmes, in areas including applied linguistics, educational assessment, learning and teaching, medical education and teacher education.

== Engagement and outreach ==
The department hosts annual lectures and a public seminar series.

Its engagement projects include TalkTogether, a UKRI Global Challenges Research Fund-supported international collaboration examining oral language development among children aged 3–6 in India and the Philippines.

The AI in Education at Oxford University hub, known as AIEOU, was launched in December 2024. It brings together researchers and other participants to examine artificial intelligence in education. The hub promotes a research-informed, ethical and human-centred approach to AI in Education through collaboration and knowledge exchange.

The department's PGCE provision works in partnership with more than 39 secondary comprehensive schools in Oxfordshire and neighbouring counties. The Oxford Education Deanery provides professional-development events, online learning, podcasts, educational resources and plain-language summaries of departmental research. It also provides links between researchers, education practitioners and policy professionals.

Researchers from the Oxford University Centre for Educational Assessment have contributed to national reporting on international studies including the Programme for International Student Assessment (PISA) and the Progress in International Reading Literacy Study (PIRLS).
