= Inner London =

Inner boroughs of Greater London

Coordinates: 51.508411°N 0.125364°W

- Statutory definition

- Statistical definition
- Sovereign state: United Kingdom
- Country: England
- Region: London
- Administrative area: Greater London

Area
  - Total: 123 sq mi (319 km^{2})

Population (2021 Census)
  - Total: 3,404,300
  - Density: 27,600/sq mi (10,700/km^{2})
- NUTS: UKI1

Inner London is the group of London boroughs that form the interior part of Greater London and are surrounded by Outer London. With its origins in the bills of mortality, it became fixed as an area for statistics in 1847 and was used as an area of local government from 1855 to 1965 principally as the County of London or earlier as the Metropolitan Board of Works Area (metropolis). It now has two common definitions. The first is the statutory definition delineated in the London Government Act 1963, coming into force on 1 April 1965, comprising twelve Inner London boroughs and almost identical to the County of London that was abolished at the same time. The second is the definition used by the Office for National Statistics comprising eleven of the statutory Inner London boroughs and two of the statutory Outer London boroughs, as well as the City of London.

Inner London is smaller than Outer London both in terms of population and area, but the population density is more than double that of Outer London. Inner London is officially the wealthiest area in Europe with the most expensive street in Europe: as of 2013, the GDP per capita was more than €80,000 while the UK GDP per capita was around €27,000.

== History ==
=== Background ===
The area that is now Inner London was defined by the Registrar General as a collection of parishes called "London" and appeared in the 1851 Census. At the time the metropolitan area—commonly called the Metropolis—had its origins in the area of the Bills of mortality that had expanded from the tiny City of London into three surrounding counties over the previous several hundred years. The area become fixed in 1847 with the addition of Lewisham Poor Law Union and the parish of Hampstead. In 1855 the Registrar General area, with the addition of Penge, was used to define the district of the Metropolitan Board of Works. The Metropolis was also described as Inner London from the 1881 Census. In 1889 this area became the County of London. The area was adjusted in 1900 when Penge was transferred to Kent and South Hornsey was gained from Middlesex.

=== London Government Act 1963 ===
The "Inner London boroughs" were defined by the London Government Act 1963. The Inner London boroughs occupied the same area as the County of London that was abolished as they were created. North Woolwich was an anomaly as it was part of the County of London, but became part of an Outer London borough.

The main difference between Inner and Outer London boroughs between 1965 and 1990 was that the councils of the inner boroughs were not local education authorities and there was a single Inner London Education Authority for the area, including the City of London. The inner borough councils became local education authorities on 1 April 1990.

The statutory definition is used as part of the grant settlement used to finance local government.

The statutory Inner London boroughs are:

- Camden
- Greenwich
- Hackney
- Hammersmith and Fulham
- Islington
- Kensington and Chelsea
- Lambeth
- Lewisham
- Southwark
- Tower Hamlets
- Wandsworth
- Westminster

Newham London Borough Council argues that the municipality should be treated as part of Inner London for statutory purposes, as it is for statistical purposes (see below). This would benefit the borough financially. Only the North Woolwich area of Newham fell within the former County of London, however, and the council's advocacy has not borne fruit.

The City of London was not designated as an Inner London borough, but the Corporation of London is usually classed as an inner London local authority.

=== Statistics ===
Inner London population pyramid in 2021

The Office for National Statistics and Eurostat define Inner London differently, explicitly including the City of London, adding Haringey and Newham, but excluding Greenwich. The land area is 319 km^{2} (123 sq mi) and the population at the 2021 Census was 3,404,300.

Inner London's population collapsed following on from the Second World War, between 1961 and 1981, it lost around 1 million people to out migration.

Historical population
Year	Population
1891	4,488,242
1901	4,859,558
1911	4,998,237
1921	4,972,870
1931	4,893,261
1939	4,364,457
1951	3,679,390
1961	3,492,879
1971	3,031,935
1981	2,550,100
1991	2,599,300
2001	2,859,400
2011	3,231,901
2021	3,404,300

==== Ethnicity ====
Ethnic Group	Year									
Ethnic Group	1981 estimations		1991 census		2001 census		2011 census		2021 census	
Ethnic Group	Number	%	Number	%	Number	%	Number	%	Number	%
White: Total	2,062,832	81.3%	1,949,430	74.2%	1,816,605	65.7%	1,853,209	57.3%	1,813,918	53.3%
White: British	–	–	–	–	1,396,753	50.5%	1,240,266	38.4%	1,130,882	33.2%
White: Irish	–	–	–	–	93,164		75,165		66,808	
White: Gypsy or Irish Traveller	–	–	–	–	–	–	3,055		1,946	
White: Roma	–	–	–	–	–	–	–	–	19,347	
White: Other	–	–	–	–	326,688	11.8%	534,723	16.5%	594,935	17.5%
Asian or Asian British: Total	161,816	6.4%	261,159	9.9%	294,361	10.6%	515,193	15.9%	586,432	17.2%
Asian or Asian British: Indian	60,166		77,999		85,471		109,933		116,889	3.4%
Asian or Asian British: Pakistani	22,730		30,824		43,559		59,890		68,055	2.0%
Asian or Asian British: Bangladeshi	35,014	1.4%	75,275	2.9%	128,314	4.6%	163,838	5.1%	216,810	6.4%
Asian or Asian British: Chinese	19,382		29,358		38,918		65,983		75,259	2.2%
Asian or Asian British: Other Asian	24,524	1%	47,703	1.8%	37,017		115,549		109,419	3.2%
Black or Black British: Total	273,511	10.8%	355,493	13.5%	454,450	16.4%	540,181	16.7%	550,140	16.2%
Black or Black British: African	70,869	2.8%	114,330		189,991		276,513	8.6%	314,496	9.2%
Black or Black British: Caribbean	161,422	6.4%	188,333	7.2%	228,691	8.3%	173,959	5.4%	167,439	4.9%
Black or Black British: Other Black	41,220		52,830		35,768		89,709		68,205	
Mixed or British Mixed: Total	–	–	–	–	107,706	3.9%	189,748	5.9%	226,320	6.6%
Mixed: White and Black Caribbean	–	–	–	–	35,855		56,900		60,460	
Mixed: White and Black African	–	–	–	–	18,335		32,203		34,224	
Mixed: White and Asian	–	–	–	–	23,651		42,114		52,712	
Mixed: Other Mixed	–	–	–	–	29,865		58,531		78,924	
Other: Total	41,932	1.7%	61,416	2.3%	54,074	2.2%	133,570	4.1%	227,335	6.7%
Other: Arab	–	–	–	–	–	–	50,821		58,171	
Other: Any other ethnic group	–	–			54,074	2.2%	82,749		169,164	
Non-White: Total	477,266	18.7%	678,070	25.8%	910,591	34.3%	1,378,692	42.7%	1,590,227	46.7%
Total	2,540,098	100%	2,627,500	100%	2,766,114	100%	3,231,901	100%	3,404,145	100%

Figures before 1971 have been reconstructed by the Office for National Statistics based on past censuses in order to fit the 2001 limits. Figures from 1981 onward are ONS midyear estimates (revised as of 2010).

After centuries of increase, the population of Inner London reached its peak of 4,998,237 in 1911. The area's population from World War I began a steady decline as that of Outer London continued to increase. The census of 1951 showed the damage inflicted by the 1940s Blitz as the population of Greater London switched into decline which was reversed in Outer London with house building and territory expansion whereas in Inner London continued. The war damage and early 20th century slums had physical and psychological hence property price effects and focus on New Towns and suburban development reflected a drive among urban planners for greener, less dense settlements. Inner London reached a post-War nadir, a population not seen since the early 19th century in 1981 having 2,550,100 residents, after which an upward trend ensued and Inner London residents numbered 3,231,901 in 2011 — 1,766,336 short of the 1911 peak.

First language of children
First language of child	1983	1997
English	84%	66%
Non-English	16%	34%

== Strategic planning ==
For the purposes of the London Plan planning document produced by the Mayor of London, Inner London consists of the City of London, all the statutory Inner London boroughs, and Newham.

== Other definitions ==
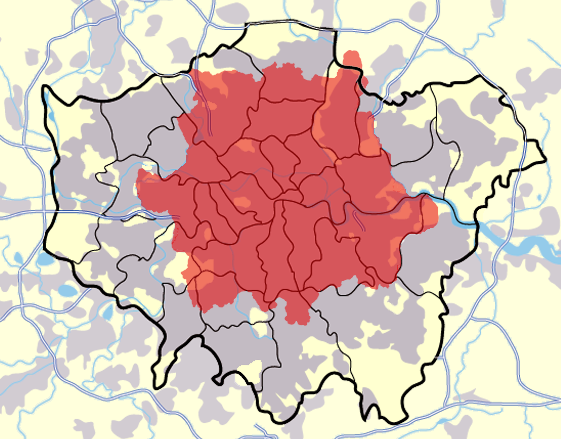
London postal district shown (in red) against the Greater London boundary

The area covered by the London postal district is sometimes referred to as "Inner London". However it is not coterminous with other definitions of Inner London as its area is somewhat larger and covers 624 km^{2} (241 sq mi). The southern part of the London Borough of Lewisham as well as a small part of the Royal Borough of Greenwich fall outside its boundaries whilst 44 of its 119 districts are in Outer London and its irregular shape stretches to the Greater London boundary at Mill Hill and Scratch Wood and beyond it at Sewardstone.

From 1990 to 2000 London used two separate telephone dialling codes with one code designated for Inner London, however the area covered by this code was widely different from all of the above definitions and most of Greater London is now covered by a single 020 dialling code.

== Economy ==
There are approximately 200,000 businesses with around 2,000,000 employees in Inner London. 56% of all private sector jobs in Greater London are located in Inner London. There is significant commuting of workers from Outer London and from outside Greater London. Much of the commercial activity is focused on Central London and Canary Wharf. 10% of public sector employment is focused on Westminster around the Government of the United Kingdom.
