= Harold Timperley (disambiguation) =

Harold Timperly may refer to:

- Harold John Timperley (1898–1954), Australian journalist
- Harold William Timperley (1890–1964; "H. W. Timperley"), British author

== See also ==
- Harold (given name)
- Timperley (surname)
- Harold (disambiguation)
- Timperley (disambiguation)
