= Portrait of (book series) =

Books about parts of Britain and France

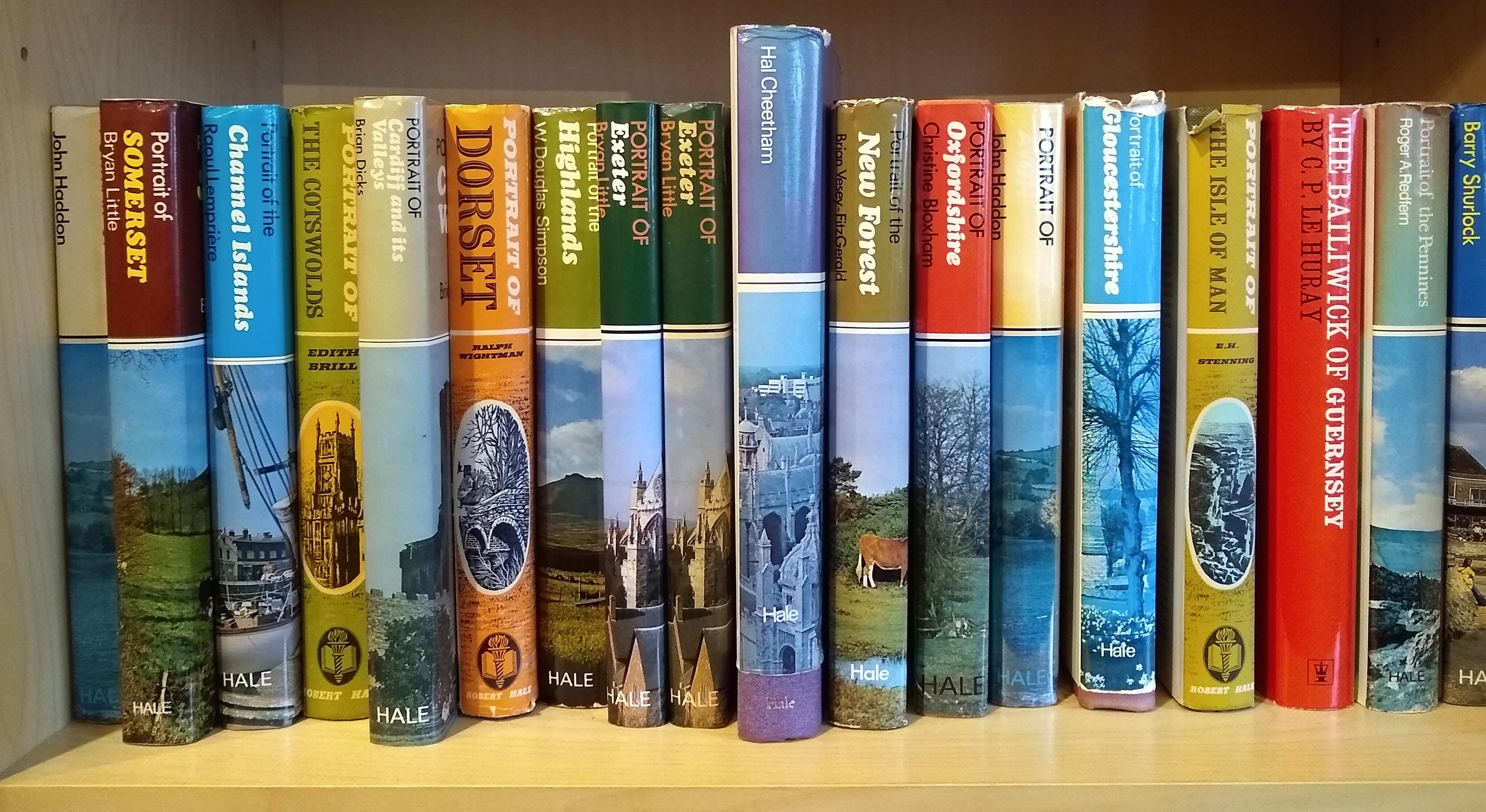
Titles in the "Portrait of" series

The Portrait of books is a series of topographical works describing the cities, counties, and regions of Britain and some of the regions of France. The series was published by Robert Hale from the early 1960s to the mid 1980s and is part of a genre of topographical books in which Robert Hale specialised.

Its immediate predecessors were the County Books and Regional Books series while the Regions of Britain series was published contemporaneously in the 1970s. There was also a Villages series. A number of the Portrait series were republished in new editions titled "The Illustrated Portrait of...".

Described variously as neither literature, a history, or a guide book, the works attempted to sum-up the atmosphere of their area, and "the lives of its people, past and present".

The artwork for a number of the series dust jackets were designed by illustrator Val Biro.

== List of titles ==
This is an incomplete list of titles. Each title was prefixed with the words "Portrait of".

- Aberdeen and Deeside by Cuthbert Graham (1972) ISBN 0709132794
- Argyll and Southern Hebrides by David Graham-Campbell (1978) ISBN 0709167466
- Avon by John Haddon (1981) ISBN 0709183615
- Bath by John Haddon (1982) ISBN 0709198833
- Bedfordshire by David H. Kennett (1978) ISBN 0709172249
- Birmingham by Vivian Bird (1970) ISBN 0709118716
- The Black Country by Harold Parsons (1986) ISBN 0709025742
- The Border Country by Nigel Tranter (1972) ISBN 0709131402 (Revised 1987 as The Illustrated Portrait of the Border Country)
- Brecon Beacons by Edmund. J. Mason (1975) ISBN 0709147104
- Bristol by Keith Brace (1971) ISBN 0709124058 (2nd edition 1976)
- The Broads by J. Wentworth Day (1967) (later 1980 title Broadland by Stanley Arthur Manning) ISBN 0709181310
- Buckinghamshire by John Camp (1972) ISBN 0709132328
- The Burns Country and Galloway &c. by Hugh Douglas (1968)
- Cambridge by Charles Richard Benstead (1968)
- Cambridgeshire by Stanley Arthur Manning (1978) ISBN 0709171331
- Caithness and Sutherland by James Miller (1985) ISBN 0709023774
- Canterbury by John Boyle (1974) ISBN 0709143443
- Cardiff and its Valleys by Brian Dicks (1984) ISBN 0709019483
- The Channel Islands by Raoul Lempriere (1970) ISBN 0709115415
- Cheshire by David Bethel (1979) ISBN 0709173415
- Chester by David Bethel (1980) ISBN 0709183593
- The Chilterns by Elizabeth Cull (1982) ISBN 0709197381
- The Clyde by Jack House (1969) ISBN 0709110650
- Cornwall by Claude Berry (1963)
- The Cotswolds by Edith Brill (1964)
- Coventry by E. B. Newbold (1972) ISBN 0709131941
- Cumbria by J. D. Marshall (1981) ISBN 0709191421
- The Dales by Norman Duerden (1978) ISBN 0709169116
- Dartmoor by Vian Smith (1966)
- The River Derwent by Walt Unsworth (1971) ISBN 070912337X
- Devon by D. St. Leger-Gordon (1963)
- Dorset by Ralph Wightman (1965)
- County Durham by Peter A. White (1967)
- Edinburgh by Ian Nimmo (1969)
- Epping Forest by Sir William Addison (1981) ISBN 0709161301
- Essex by Stanley Arthur Manning (1977) ISBN 0709163886
- Exeter by Bryan Little (1983) ISBN 0709007779
- Exmoor by J. H. B. Peel (1970) ISBN 0709116004
- The Fen Country by Edward Storey (1971) ISBN 0709124430
- Glasgow by Maurice Lindsay (1972) ISBN 0709130783
- Gloucestershire by T. A. Ryder (1966)
- Gower by Wynford Vaughan-Thomas (1976) ISBN 0709155778
- Hampshire by Noreen O'Dell (1979) ISBN 0709175493
- Hertfordshire by Brian J. Bailey (1978) ISBN 0709166036
- The Highlands by W. Douglas Simpson (1969)
- The Howgills and the Upper Eden Valley by Michael Ffinch (1982) ISBN 0709005393
- Humberside by Ivan E. Broadhead (1983) ISBN 0709012144
- The Isle of Man by Ernest H. Stenning (new ed. 1965)
- The Isle of Wight by Lawrence Wilson (1965)
- The Isles of Scilly by Clive Mumford (1967)
- Kendal and the Kent Valley by Michael Ffinch (1983) ISBN 0709012853
- The Lakes by Norman Nicholson (1963)
- Lancashire by Jessica Lofthouse (1967)
- Leeds by Brian Thompson (1971) ISBN 0709127731
- Leicestershire by Brian J. Bailey (1977) ISBN 0709160054
- Limerick by Mainchín Seoighe (1982) ISBN 0709198817
- Lincolnshire by Michael Lloyd (1983) ISBN 0709008465
- Liverpool by Howard Channon (1970) ISBN 0709118112
- London by Robert Clayton (1980) ISBN 0709183607
- London River by Basil E. Cracknell (1968)
- The Lothians by Nigel Tranter (1979) ISBN 0709174675
- Manchester by Michael Kennedy (1970) ISBN 0709118120
- The Moray Firth by Cuthbert Graham (1977) ISBN 0709160186
- The New Forest by Brian Vesey-FitzGerald (1966)
- Norfolk by David Yaxley (1977) ISBN 0709162677
- North Wales by Michael Senior (1973) ISBN 0709136943
- North York Moors by Nicholas Rhea (1985) ISBN 070902276X
- North Yorkshire by Colin Speakman (1986) ISBN 0709025807
- Northamptonshire by Peter Gorham Webb (1977) ISBN 0709160615
- Northumberland by Nancy Ridley (1965) (2nd Edition 1968) ISBN 0709105738
- Nottingham by Emrys Bryson (1974) ISBN 0709143389
- Oxford by Hal Cheetham (1971) ISBN 0709124155
- Oxfordshire by Christine Bloxham (1982) ISBN 070919448X
- Peakland by Crichton Porteous (1963)
- Pembrokeshire by Dillwyn Miles (1984) ISBN 070902004X
- The Pennines by Roger A. Redfern (1969) ISBN 0709108729
- Penrith and the East Fellside by Michael Ffinch (1985) ISBN 0709023758
- Perth, Angus and Fife by David Graham-Campbell (1979) ISBN 0709175507
- The Potteries by Bill Morland (1978) ISBN 0709165730
- Plymouth by J. C. Trewin (1973) ISBN 0709139268
- The Quantocks by Vincent Waite (1964)
- River Medway by Roger Penn (1981) ISBN 070919434X
- The River Trent by Peter Lord (1968)
- The Scott Country by Marion Lochhead (1968)
- The Severn by J. H. B. Peel (1968)
- The Shakespeare Country by J. C. Trewin (1970) ISBN 0709113420
- Sheffield by B. Bunker (1972) ISBN 070913245X
- The Shires by Bernard Newman (1968)
- Shropshire by Brian J. Bailey (1981) ISBN 0709193408
- Skye and the Outer Hebrides by W. Douglas Simpson (1967)
- Snowdonia by Cledwyn Hughes (1967)
- The Solent by Barry Shurlock (1983) ISBN 0709007639
- Somerset by Bryan Little (1969)
- South Wales by Michael Senior (1974) ISBN 070914721X
- The Spey by Francis G. Thompson (1979) ISBN 0709174683
- Suffolk by Allan Jobson (1973) ISBN 0709140150
- Surrey by Basil E. Cracknell (1970) ISBN 0709113870
- Sussex by Cecile Woodford (1972) ISBN 0709130260
- The Thames by J. H. B. Peel (1967)
- West Yorkshire by Margaret Slack (1984) ISBN 070901550X
- Wiltshire by Pamela Street (1971) (2nd edition 1980) ISBN 0709121091
- Windermere by Christopher D. Taylor (1983) ISBN 0709009240
- Wirral by Kenneth Burley (1981) ISBN 0709194099
- Worcestershire by Peter J. Neville Havins (1974) ISBN 070914587X
- Wordsworth Country by Roland Sands (1984) ISBN 0709017391
- Wye Valley by Harry Luff Verne Fletcher (1968)
- York by Ronald Willis (1972) ISBN 0709133766
- Yorkshire by Harry J. Scott (1965) ISBN 0709118422
- The Yorkshire Ouse by Ivan E. Broadhead (1982) ISBN 0709196059

== See also ==
- County Books series
- Regional Books series
