= John Clark Milne =

Scottish poet (1897–1962)

- Born: 1897; Memsie, Aberdeenshire, Scotland
- Died: 1962 (aged 64–65)
- Occupation: Poet
- Known for: The Orra Loon

John Clark Milne (1897–1962) was a Scottish poet who wrote in the Doric dialect of the Scots language. He was also a teacher and educationalist. Some of his poetry was written for children.

== Life ==
John Milne was born at Memsie, near Fraserburgh in Aberdeenshire in 1897 to a farming family. He attended the University of Aberdeen where he excelled academically, then became a teacher. In later years he was Master of Method at Aberdeen College of Education. His collection of verses, The Orra Loon was published in 1946 and his collected Poems in 1963.

The northeastern poet and novelist Nan Shepherd helped prepare the latter edition of Milne's poetry, published after his death. In 2009 the Buchan Heritage Society launched a CD on which well-known local performers and artists had collaborated in recording samples of his work. The society hoped that through hearing Milne's unique poetry children would help preserve the Doric tongue, which many in the area have forgotten.

== Work ==
According to Cuthbert Graham, "The imaginative literature of Aberdeen for the past century has been dominated by a single theme–a single myth if you like in the deep psychological sense–a passion for the land... In poetry Charles Murray, John C. Milne and Flora Garry have illuminated the same obsessive concern." J.C. Milne's work was full of humorous irony, through which he could express his unique viewpoint while apparently reporting the speech of the characters he depicted. Milne had an extraordinary ability to exploit the potential for rhyming in the dialect. Rich in vocabulary, his poetry seemed simple and unaffected. A snatch of Milne's poetry, with the wonderful word "contermashious", meaning "contrary":

O Lord look doon on Buchan
An a' its fairmer chiels!
For there's nae in a' Yer warld
Mair contermashious deils!

== Bibliography ==
- Milne, John Clark (1946). THE Orra Loon and Other Poems. Geo E. Findlay & Co Ltd.
- Milne, John Clark (1963). Poems. Aberdeen University Press. ISBN 978-0-900015-35-9.
- Milne, J. C. (1964). Poems of J C Milne. VUB Gilde-Buchhandlung GmbH & Company KG. ISBN 978-0-08-023629-2.
