= County Books series =

Series about counties and regions in the British Isles

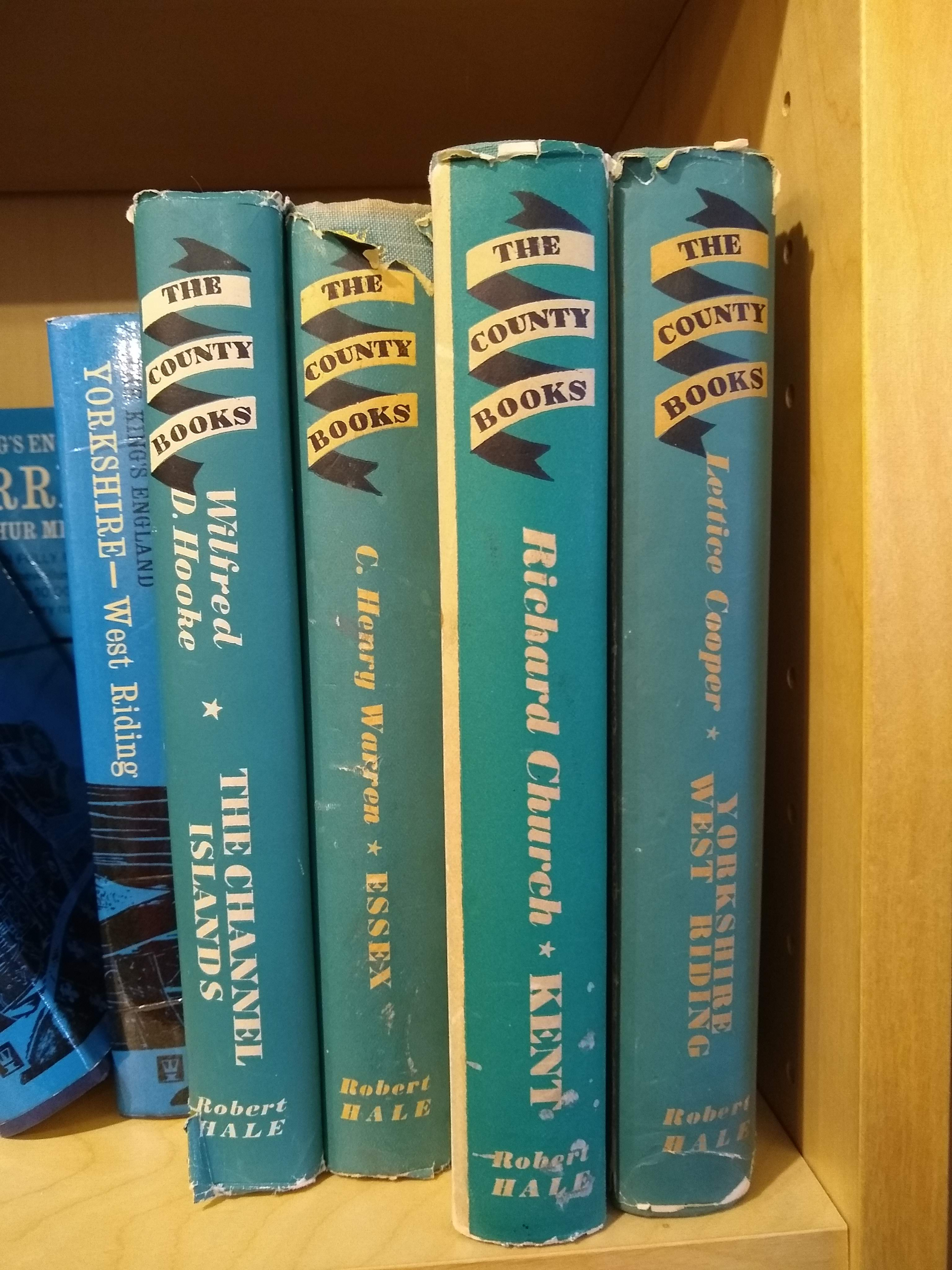
County Books volumes (right)

The County Books series, by Robert Hale and Company of London, covered counties and regions in the British Isles. It was launched in March 1947, and began with Kent, Surrey and Sussex. The series was announced as completed in 1954, in 60 volumes, with Lowlands of Scotland: Edinburgh and the South by Maurice Lindsay. The announced intention was to give "a true and lively picture of each county and people".

Brian Vesey-Fitzgerald was general editor of the County Books, and he also edited a series of Regional Books for Robert Hale. Both series were eulogistic about the countryside.

== The County Books ==
Title	Year	Author
Bedfordshire	1950	Laurence Meynell
Berkshire	1952	Ian Yarrow
Buckinghamshire	1950	Alison Uttley
Cambridgeshire, Huntingdonshire and The Isle of Ely	1951	Eric Arnold Roberts Ennion
Cheshire	1949	Frederick Herbert Crossley
The Channel Islands	1953	Wilfred D. Hooke
Cornwall	1949	Claude Berry
Cumberland and Westmorland	1949	Norman Nicholson
Derbyshire	1950	Crichton Porteous
Devonshire	1950	Douglas St. Leger-Gordon
Dorset	1950	Eric Benfield
Durham	1952 (two vols.)	Timothy Calvert Eden
East London	1950	Robert Sinclair
Essex	1950	Clarence Henry Warren
Gloucestershire	1949	Kenneth Hare
Hampshire and the Isle of Wight	1949	Brian Vesey-Fitzgerald (series editor)
Herefordshire	1948	Harry Luff Verne Fletcher
Hertfordshire	1950	William Beach Thomas
Highlands of Scotland	1963	Seton Gordon
The Isle of Man	1950	E. H. Stenning
Kent	1948	Richard Church
Lancashire	1951	Walter Greenwood
Leicestershire	1950	Guy Paget and Lionel Herbert Irvine
Leinster, Munster and Connaught	1950	Frank O'Connor
Lincoln	1952	John Bygott
London West of the Bars	1951	Wilfrid Douglas Newton
London: The City	1951	Claud Golding
London: The Northern Reaches	1951	Robert Colville
London: The Western Reaches	1950	Godfrey James
Lowlands of Scotland: Edinburgh and the South	1956	Maurice Lindsay
Lowlands of Scotland: Glasgow and the North	1953	Maurice Lindsay
Middlesex	1951	Norman George Brett-James
Monmouthshire	1951	Olive Phillips
Norfolk	1951	Doreen Wallace and Richard Perceval Bagnall Oakeley
Northamptonshire	1954	Tony Ireson
North-East Lowlands of Scotland	1952	John Robertson Allan
Northumberland	1949	Herbert L. Honeyman
Nottinghamshire	1953	Christopher Marsden
Orkney	1951	Hugh Marwick
Oxfordshire	1952	Joanna Cannan
The Shetland Isles	1956	Andrew Thomas Cluness
Shropshire	1949	Edmund Vale
Skye and the Inner Hebrides	1953	Alasdair Alpin MacGregor
Somerset	1949	M. Lovett Turner
South London	1949	Harry Williams
Staffordshire	1948	Phil Drabble
Suffolk	1950	William Addison
Surrey	1947	Frederick Moore Searle Parker
Sussex	1947	Esther Meynell
Ulster	1949	Hugh Shearman
Wales	1952 (2 vols.)	Maxwell Fraser
Warwickshire	1950	Alan Burgess
Western Isles	1949	Alasdair Alpin MacGregor
Wiltshire	1951	Edith Olivier
Worcestershire	1949	L. T. C. Rolt
Yorkshire East Riding	1951	John Fairfax-Blakeborough
Yorkshire North Riding	1951	Oswald Henry Harland
Yorkshire West Riding	1950	Lettice Cooper

== See also ==
- Portrait Books series
- The Regional Books
