= Newport Harbor =

Newport Harbor may refer to:

== Places ==
- Newport Beach, California
- Newport Harbor High School, in Newport Beach, Orange County, California
- Newport Harbor Light, in Newport, Rhode Island
- Newport, Rhode Island
- Newport, Pembrokeshire

== Media ==
- Newport Harbor: The Real Orange County, an MTV reality show

== See also ==
- Newport Bay (disambiguation)
