= The Regional Books (book series) =

Series of British topographical guides of the 1950s

Torridon Highlands by Brenda G. Macrow in The Regional Books series, 1953.

The Regional Books is a book series of topographical guides to the British regions published by Robert Hale and Company that was published in the United Kingdom from 1952 to 1955. The books were edited by Brian Vesey-Fitzgerald.

In the 1970s they published a broader Regions of Britain series.

Title	Date	Author
Black Country	1952	Phil Drabble
Breckland	1956	Olive Cook
The Broads	1952	R. H. Mottram
The Channel Shore	1953	Aubrey de Selincourt
The Cotswolds	1955	Edith Brill
Dartmoor	1958	Ernest Walter Martin
Exmoor	1953	Laurence Meynell
The Fens	1953	Alan Bloom
Forest of Dean	1952	Francis William Baty
Gower	1956	Olive Phillips
Holiday Lancashire	1955	Sydney Moorhouse
The Isle of Wight	1953	Monica Hutchings
The Mendips	1954	Arthur Wilfred Coysh, Edward John Mason and Vincent Waite
Merthyr, Rhondda and The Valleys	1958	Arthur Trystan Edwards
The Northern Marches	1953	Cledwyn Hughes
Peakland	1954	Crichton Porteous
Pembrokeshire	1957	Ronald Lockley
Romney Marsh	1953	Walter J. C. Murray
Salisbury Plain	1955	Ralph Whitlock
The Scilly Isles	1953	Clara Coltman Rogers Vyvyan
Sedgemoor and Avalon	1954	Desmond Hawkins
The Solway Firth	1955	Brian Blake
The South Hams	1955	Margaret Willy
The Southern Marches	1952	H. J. Massingham
Thames Estuary	1954	William Wilkinson Addison
Torridon Highlands	1953	Brenda Grace Joan Macrow
The Vale of Berkeley	1954	Lewis Wilshire
The Vale of Pewsey	1954	H. W. Timperley
The Weald of Kent and Sussex	1953	Sheila Kaye-Smith
The Wessex Heathland	1953	Ralph Wightman
The Wirral Peninsula	1955	Norman Ellison

== See also ==
- County Books series
- Portrait Books series
