= Newport Bay =

Newport Bay may refer to:

- Disney's Newport Bay Club, a hotel situated at the Disneyland Paris
- Newport Bay (Maryland), an arm of Chincoteague Bay between the mainland of Worcester County, Maryland and Sinepuxent Neck
- Upper Newport Bay, the relatively natural and marsh-like upper portion of a long coastal inlet in Southern California
- Newport Back Bay, the inland delta in Newport Beach, California
- Newport Bay (California), Lower Newport Bay formed by the Balboa Peninsula, the harbor of Newport Beach, California
- Newport Bay (Wales), on the Pembrokeshire coast.

== See also ==
- Newport Harbor (disambiguation)
