= John R. Allan =

Scottish journalist, broadcaster, author and farmer (1906–1986)

John Robertson Allan
- Born: 4 September 1906; Udny, Aberdeenshire
- Died: 24 October 1986 (aged 80); Blairlogie, Stirling, Scotland
- Education: University of Edinburgh
- Occupations: Journalist, broadcaster, author, and farmer
- Writing career
- Language: English
- Genres: Topographical and agriculture non-fiction
- Notable works: Farmer's Boy (1935); North-East Lowlands of Scotland (1952)

John Robertson Allan (4 September 1906 – 24 October 1986) was a Scottish journalist, broadcaster, author, and farmer. He is known for his books about agricultural life in Scotland such as the semi-autobiographical Farmer's Boy (1935) and the posthumously published novel Green Heritage about the traditions and challenges of tenant farming in the north-east of Scotland. He also wrote a number of non-fiction works on topographical subjects and country life such as The Lowlands of Scotland (1951) for the Festival of Britain's About Britain series.

== Early life ==
John Allan was born at Udny, Aberdeenshire, on 4 September 1906. His Farmer's Boy (1935) was an imaginative semi-autobiographical account of a childhood there and has been reissued several times. He received his advanced education at the University of Aberdeen.

== Writing ==
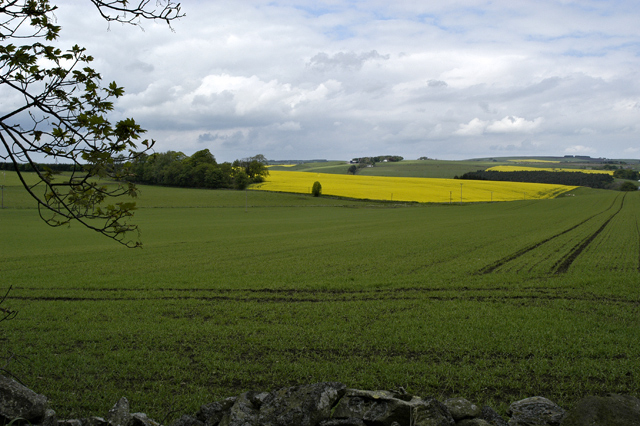
Crops near Methlick

Allan worked as a journalist in Glasgow before farming at Methlick in Aberdeenshire.

Among his writings he is best remembered for Farmer's Boy, described by Allan Massie as "the most evocative memoir of rural Aberdeenshire" and for the North-East Lowlands of Scotland (1952) in Robert Hale's County Books series, described by Massie as the "indispensable introduction" to the area and by Allan's son as his "definitive work".

His Summer in Scotland (1938) was reviewed positively by The Times who noted that it had little to say about the Highlands, to which the author admitted he was a stranger, but provided comprehensive coverage of Scotland further south with a great deal of detail about local customs and culture. Unusually for a travel writer, Allan did not seem to have any interest in the old and did not effuse about scenery.

In England Without End (1940), The Times identified a tension between the down-trodden workers and greedy land-owners that Allan described and his natural appreciation of the landscape and buildings in which they existed.

In 1951 he wrote The Lowlands of Scotland, one of a series of 13 regional guides to Britain produced for the Festival of Britain that year.

Later, he wrote a popular weekly column for the Press and Journal.

== Broadcasting ==
In the mid 1930s Allan broadcast The Week in Scotland, The Farm Year: A calendar of the rural round broadcast from a farm in Buchan, commentated on the International Sheep Dog Trials at Ayr, and participated in various other programmes on the BBC's Scottish and Home services. His son estimates that his father wrote hundreds of plays for radio and other pieces, many for schools, into the 1950s.

In 1963 he contributed to Beyond the Grampians, a short film describing the life of the fishing and farming communities of his native Aberdeenshire.

== Other activities ==
Allan served in the British Army during the Second World War, starting as a sapper and ending as a captain. He did not serve abroad. After the end of the war he stood for the Labour Party in the general election of 1945 in the Aberdeen and Kincardine East constituency, losing to the Unionist Bob Boothby.

== Later life ==
In 1991, his son Charlie described the various impediments that prevented Allan from leaving a greater literary legacy, such as the effects of the Second World War (according to Mrs Allan), well-paid BBC radio jobs that took priority and left no legacy in print, and pneumonia in 1954 combined with cirrhosis of the liver that almost killed him and left him permanently weakened and struggling to complete serious literary work.

== Death and legacy ==
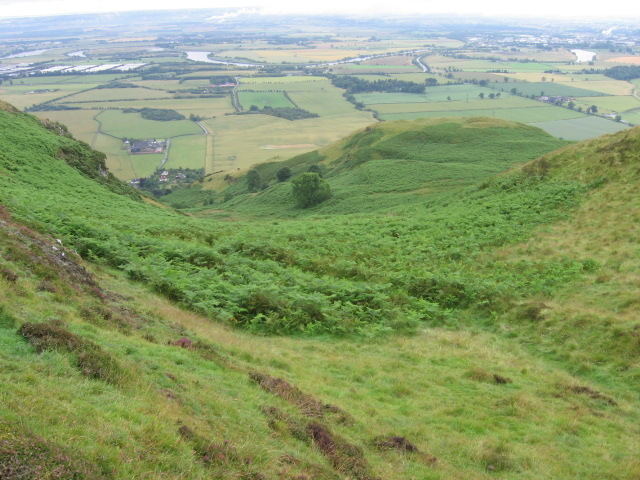
Above Blairlogie

John Allan died on 24 October 1986 at the age of 80 at his home in Blairlogie near Stirling. A memorial service was held at Tarves Parish Church.

After his death, his son discovered seven complete or partly complete novels which Allan apparently never tried to have published. One, Green Heritage, was written in the late 1930s and published in 1991 by Ardo Publishing, edited by Charlie Allan and with a foreword by Charles Calder of the University of Edinburgh in which he compares the themes of the book to those of Allan's semi autobiographical Farmer's Boy of 1935 in describing the "robustness and spiritual independence" of the north-east tenant farmer struggling to make a living in the face of the elements, greedy land-owners and rapacious bankers. The original manuscript was deposited in the National Library of Scotland.

Brig o'Don Boy, the first part of an unfinished sequel to Farmer's Boy, was published as an appendix to a new edition of Farmer's Boy in 2009.

== Selected publications ==
Allan's publications include:

- A New Song to the Lord. Porpoise Press, Edinburgh, 1931. (Porpoise Pamphlets. No. 3)
- Farmer's Boy ... (An imaginative reconstruction of the past.). Methuen, 1935. Illustrated by Douglas Percy Bliss. Reissued by Serif Books, Edinburgh, in 1948 in the Scottish Evergreen series, and in 2009 by Berlinn with a foreword by Charlie Allan.
- Down on the Farm. Methuen, London, 1937. Illustrated by John Maxwell.
- Scotland-1938. Twenty-five impressions. Oliver & Boyd, Edinburgh & London, 1938. (Editor)
- Summer in Scotland. Methuen, London, 1938.
- England Without End. Methuen, London, 1940.
- Market Town. Oxford University Press & National Federation of Young Farmers' Clubs, London, 1943. (Illustrated by Lionel Edwards)
- The Lowlands of Scotland. Collins, London, 1951. (About Britain series)
- North-East Lowlands of Scotland. Robert Hale, London, 1952. County Books series. 2nd edition 1974. New edition Birlinn, Edinburgh, 2010, with introduction by Charlie Allan. ISBN 9781841588308
- The Seasons Return: Impressions of Farm Life. Robert Hale, London, 1955.
- Crombies of Grandholm and Cothall, 1805–1960. Records of an Aberdeenshire Enterprise. Central Press, Edinburgh, [1960]. (Editor)
- Green Heritage. Ardo Publishing, Buchan, 1991. Foreword by Charles Calder, illustrated by Ruth Smythe. ISBN 9780951846407
