= J. H. B. Peel =

British journalist, author and poet

John Hugh Brignal Peel
- Born: 4 November 1913
- Died: 22 May 1983 (aged 69)
- Occupation: journalist, author, poet,

John Hugh Brignal Peel (4 November 1913 – 22 May 1983) was a British journalist, author and poet, writing, as J. H. B. Peel, about farming and the countryside. From the 1960s, he wrote a fortnightly essay, "Country Talk", for the Daily Telegraph. He wrote and narrated radio and television programmes. He was also awarded "Book of the Year" on two occasions by The Sunday Times.

== Education ==
His father was the comedian Gillie Potter. He was educated at Merchant Taylors' School, Northwood, and at Oriel College, Oxford.

== Bibliography ==
A number of his books was illustrated by Val Biro.

=== Poetry ===
- In the Country (1944)
- Mere England: A Poem, Chaterson Ltd. (1946)
- Frost at Midnight (1947)
- Light and Shade, Robert Hale (1976) ISBN 0-7091-5826-2
- Time To Go, Watts & Co, 1942

=== Essays ===
- Small Calendars: Country Essays, (illustrated by W. M. Cuthill), Arthur Barker (1948)
- Country Talk (illustrated by Balint Stephen Biro), Robert Hale (1970) ISBN 0-7091-1770-1
- More Country Talk (illustrated by Balint Stephen Biro), Robert Hale (1973) ISBN 0-7091-4176-9
- New Country Talk (illustrated by Balint Stephen Biro), Robert Hale (1975) ISBN 0-7091-5334-1
- Country Talk Again (illustrated by Balint Stephen Biro), Robert Hale (1977) ISBN 0-7091-6371-1
- Country Talk Continued, (illustrated by Balint Stephen Biro), Robert Hale (1979) 0-7091-7861-1
- Latest Country Talk, (illustrated by Balint Stephen Biro), Robert Hale (1981) ISBN 0-7091-9418-8
- Another Country Talk (illustrated by Valerie Warren), Robert Hale (1983) ISBN 0-7090-1282-9
- Off The Beaten Track, Robert Hale (1984) ISBN 0 7090 1547 X
- People And Places, (illustrated by Valerie Croker), Robert Hale (1980) ISBN 0 7091 8583 9

=== Travel related ===
- Buckinghamshire Footpaths (1949)
- The Chilterns (drawings by James Arnold), Elek (1950)
- Discovering the Chilterns (1967)
- Portrait of the Thames, Robert Hale (1967)
- Portrait of the Severn, Robert Hale (1968)
- North Wales and Anglesey (maps by Jack Parker and Alan Walton), Charles Letts & Co, (1969)
- England in Colour, Batsford (1969) ISBN 0-7134-0017-X
- Portrait of Exmoor, Robert Hale (1970)
- Along the Pennine Way, Cassell (1972) & by David & Charles (1979)
- Along the Roman Roads of Britain, Cassell (1971) ISBN 0-304-93738-X
- Along the Green Roads of Britain, Cassell (1976)
- Peel's England, David and Charles (1977)
- All Over Britain, Robert Hale (1978) ISBN 0-7091-7206-0

=== Other ===
- A Man's Life, Barker (1950)
- The Gallant Story, Barker (1955)
- An Englishman's Home (illustrated by Ronald Maddox), David & Charles (1972) ISBN 0-7153-7637-3
