= Cuthbert Graham =

Cuthbert Graham (25 August 1911 – 22 September 1987) was a journalist, historian, author and poet known for his works about the topography of Scotland and his column in The Press and Journal as the "North-east Muse". Graham wrote two volumes in Robert Hale's Portrait of series. His Aberdeen and Deeside was described by The Times as without gush over his native city of Aberdeen and having a workmanlike and unfussy text. After his death, a memorial service was held at St. Machar's Cathedral, Aberdeen.

== Selected publications ==
- Portrait of Aberdeen and Deeside, with Aberdeenshire, Banff and Kincardine. Robert Hale, London, 1972. (Portrait of series) ISBN 0709132794
- Historical Walkabout of Aberdeen. Aberdeen Corporation Publicity Department, 1975. ISBN 9780904861006
- Drum Castle: Aberdeenshire. National Trust for Scotland, 1977. (With David Learmont)
- Portrait of the Moray Firth. Robert Hale, London, 1977. (Portrait of series) ISBN 0709160186
- The Press and Journal: North-east Muse Anthology. Aberdeen, 1977. (Editor)
- Old Aberdeen: Burgh-Cathedral-University. Kirk Session of the Cathedral Church of St. Machar, Aberdeen, 1978.
- Grampian: The Castle Country. Grampian Regional Council, 1981.
- Castle Fraser: A Masterpiece of Native Genius. National Trust for Scotland, 1982.
- The Living Doric. Rainbow Books for the Charles Murray Memorial Trust, 1985. (Editor)
- Archibald Simpson: Architect of Aberdeen, 1790-1847
