= Carreg Coetan Arthur =

Neolithic burial chamber in Newport, west Wales

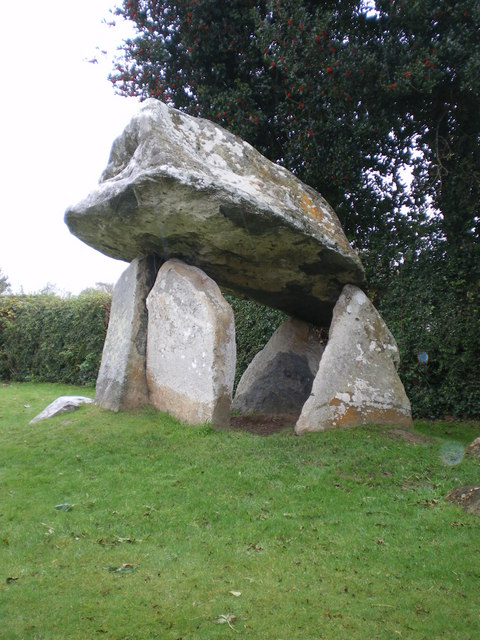
- The dolmen in 2008
- Interactive map of Carreg Coetan Arthur
- 54.940417°N 8.329167°E
- Type: Dolmen
- Location: Newport, Pembrokeshire, Wales

History
- Built: c. 3000 BC

Site notes
- Material: Stone
- Length: 4 m (13 ft)

Carreg Coetan Arthur and other nearby Neolithic sites

Carreg Coetan Arthur is a Neolithic dolmen in Newport, Pembrokeshire, Wales.

Carreg Coetan Arthur dates from around 3000 BC and is the remains of a Neolithic burial chamber (also known as a quoit).

The remains consist of a 4-metre-long capstone on smaller supporting rocks. It would have originally been earth covered, but this has eroded away.

The site is managed by Cadw and it is a scheduled monument.
