= Dillwyn Miles =

Welsh writer and historian

- Born: 25 May 1915; Newport, Pembrokeshire
- Died: 1 August 2007
- Education: Aberystwyth University
- Occupation: Welsh writer
- Notable work: The Castles of Pembrokeshire (1979); A Pembrokeshire Anthology (1983); The Pembrokeshire Coast National Park (1987); The Secret of the Bards of the Isle of Britain (1992); The Lords of Cemais (1997); A Mingled Yarn (2000)

Dillwyn Miles (25 May 1915 – 1 August 2007) was a Welsh writer.

Miles was born in Newport, Pembrokeshire and baptised William James Dillwyn Miles. He became in 1932 the youngest clerk of a parish council in the country, following the death of his father. While still underage he was elected a burgess and was to serve as Mayor of Newport three times, the last in 1979–80. He attended university at Aberystwyth but was so dogged by ill-health his obituary was prepared. After college, he taught in various places around Pembrokeshire from 1936 till the outbreak of war.

He served mainly in Palestine, having enlisted in the Royal Army Service Corps in 1939. During June 1941 he had the task of typing and re-typing the 22-clause peace agreement following the overthrow of the Vichy regime in Syria. A newspaper report of the time recorded "the magnificent service rendered by a young Welsh poet who displayed remarkable ability during the crisis following the surrender of the Syrian Forces". Another said it "had been drafted by Wales's youngest bard". Miles managed to keep a copy of the agreement and one of the pens used to sign it.

Back in Wales, Miles was a member of the Gorsedd of Bards of the National Eisteddfod, Grand Swordbearer, and Herald Bard. He was in attendance at Caernarvon Castle in July 1969 for the Investiture of the Prince of Wales.

Miles worked tirelessly for Welsh affairs, including lecturing at the University of Wales, serving on influential committees concerned with health, welfare and culture, and served as Mayor of Haverfordwest. He edited the Pembrokeshire Historian for almost 30 years and in 1973 founded the Association of Trusts for Nature Conservation in Wales.

His wife died in 1976. Miles was survived by a son and daughter, and his companion of twenty-three years, Judith.

== Selected bibliography ==
- The Castles of Pembrokeshire (1979)
- A Pembrokeshire Anthology (1983)
- Portrait of Pembrokeshire (1984) from the Portrait of (book series)
- The Pembrokeshire Coast National Park (1987)
- The Secret of the Bards of the Isle of Britain (1992)
- The Lords of Cemais (1997)
- A Mingled Yarn (2000)
