= William Wilkinson Addison =

English historian, author and jurist

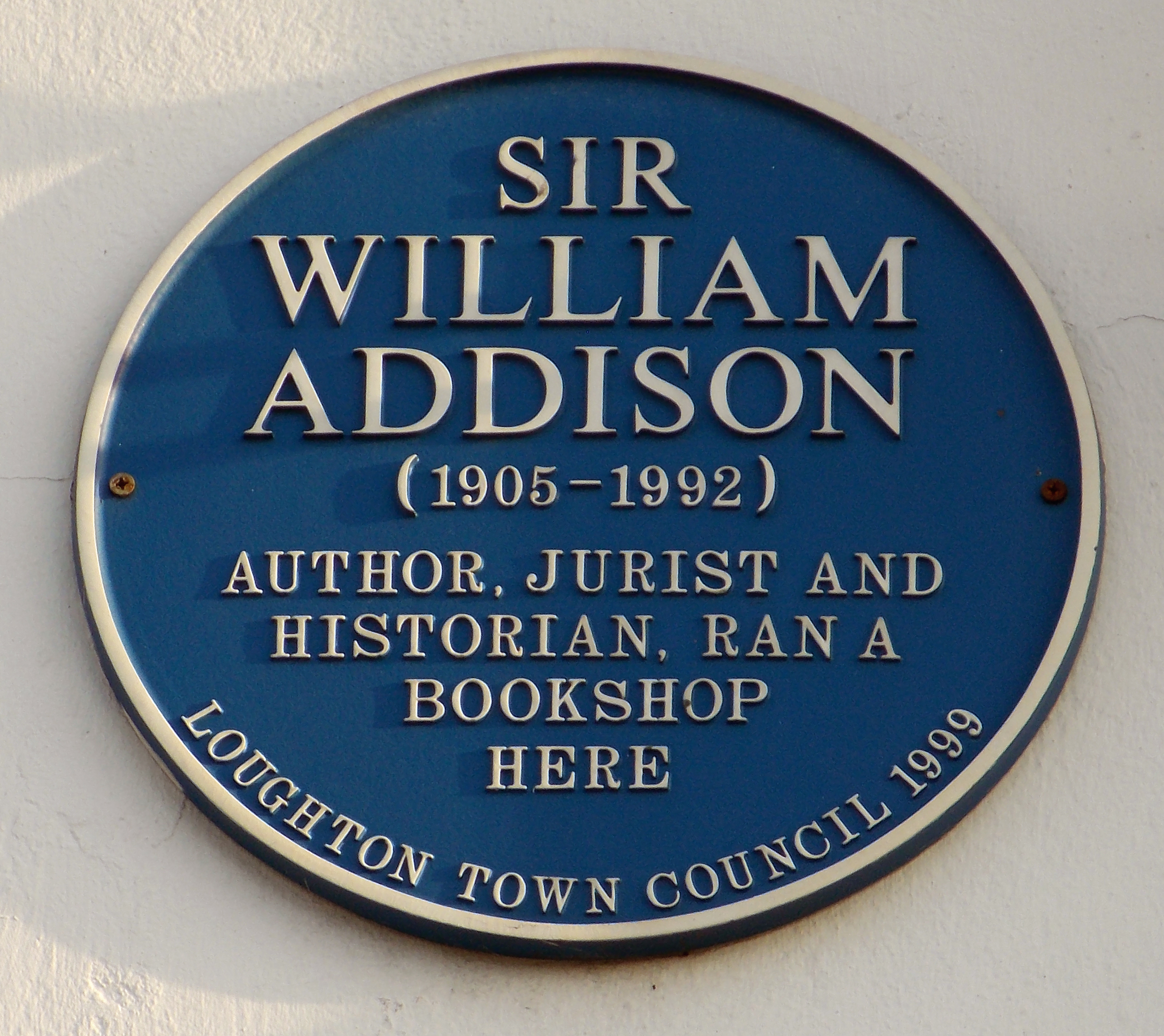
- Plaque to William Addison at Loughton
- Born: 4 April 1905; Mitton, West Riding of Yorkshire, England
- Died: 1 November 1992 (aged 87); Epping Forest, (Note: Epping Forest Registration District) Essex, England
- Occupations: Historian; author; jurist

Sir William Wilkinson Addison (4 April 1905 – 1 November 1992) was an English historian, writer and jurist. He is significant for his research and books on Essex and East Anglian subjects.

== Biography ==
William Addison was born in 1905 at Mitton, now in the Ribble Valley of Lancashire, England. (Note: Mitton was part of West Riding of Yorkshire in 1905) His direct ancestors were from King's Meaburn—then Westmorland, now Cumbria—and were 14th-century tenants from Grasmere to Bowness. The Addison family were borough administrators and recorders at Clitheroe, one a Constable of Lancaster Castle, and supported the restoration of parish churches and two grammar schools, one of which, Clitheroe Royal Grammar School, William Addison attended.

After Addison's marriage in 1929 to Phoebe Dean, daughter of Robert Dean of Rimington, then in the West Riding of Yorkshire, the couple moved to Suffolk, and then to Buckhurst Hill on the edge of Epping Forest, Essex. Addison bought a bookshop in the neighbouring town of Loughton, and began his lifelong association with Epping Forest which resulted in books on the history and people of the area. He became an elected Verderer of the forest from 1954 to 1984 and chaired history organizations including the Essex Archaeological and Historical Congress and Waltham Abbey Historical Society. He was a founder member of the Friends of Essex Churches, and later its president, and was vice president of the Association of Genealogists and Record Agents (1985-1988), and the Council for the Protection of Rural England (from 1984). Addison was chairman of the Editorial and County Committee for the Victoria County History of Essex.

Addison was a magistrate for more than twenty-five years, becoming a Justice of the Peace in 1949, and Chairman of the Epping, and the Epping and Ongar Petty Sessions in 1955. From 1959 he advised and sat on the Council of the Magistrates’ Association, later becoming its chairman from 1970 to 1976. In 1973 Addison was appointed a Deputy Lieutenant of Essex. He was knighted in 1974 for services to public life.

William Addison wrote twenty books on historic aspects and prominent people of East Anglia, Essex, and Epping Forest, and wrote poems from 1936 to his death in his eighty-seventh year. He owned a bookshop at 169 High Road, Loughton, which is marked by a blue plaque.

== Publications ==
- 1945 – Epping Forest. Its literary and historical associations, J. M. Dent
- 1947 – The English Country Parson, J. M. Dent
- 1949 – Essex Heyday, J. M. Dent
- 1950 – Suffolk, Robert Hale - County Books Series
- 1951 – English Spas, Batsford/Pavilion Books
- 1951 – Worthy Dr. Fuller, J. M. Dent
- 1953 – Audley End, etc. With special reference to the Howard family, J. M. Dent
- 1953 – English Fairs and Markets, Batsford
- 1954 – Thames Estuary, Robert Hale - Regional Books Series
- 1955 – In the Steps of Charles Dickens, Rich & Cowan
- 1973 – Essex Worthies: a Biographical Companion to the County, Phillimore. ISBN 0850330807
- 1973 – Wanstead Park, Corporation of London
- 1977 – Portrait of Epping Forest, Robert Hale - Portrait of (book series) ISBN 0709161301
- 1977 – Queen Elizabeth's Hunting Lodge and Epping Forest Museum, Conservators of Epping Forest
- 1978 – Understanding English Surnames, Batsford. ISBN 0713405651
- 1979 – Understanding English Place Names, Batsford. ISBN 0713402954
- 1980 – The Old Roads of England, HarperCollins. ISBN 0713417145
- 1982 – Local Styles of the English Parish Church, Batsford. ISBN 0713425644
- 1986 – Farmhouses in the English Landscape, Robert Hale. ISBN 070902813X
- 1991 – Epping Forest: Figures in a Landscape, Robert Hale. ISBN 0709043872
- 2002 – Addison William; Winter Forest and Other Poems, editor: Richard Morris; illustrator: Clare Eastwood; Corporation of London (published posthumously). ISBN 0852030762
