= Allen W. Seaby =

University of Reading professor

- Born: 25 May 1867; London, England
- Died: 28 July 1953 (aged 86); Reading, Berkshire, England
- Education: Reading School of Art
- Occupations: Painter; Printmaker; Author; Academic
- Employer: University of Reading
- Relatives: Robert Gillmor (grandson)

Allen William Seaby (25 May 1867 – 28 July 1953) Is best known as an ornithological painter and printmaker, and Professor of Fine Art at the University of Reading. He was the author of several art books for students, and also wrote and illustrated books for children.

== Life ==
Allen W. Seaby was a student at Reading School of Art under Frank Morley Fletcher, where he developed a lifelong passion for colour woodblock printing in the Japanese style. Published on a range of subjects, including art history and technique as well as children's literature, Seaby taught fine art at the University of Reading for many years, eventually becoming a professor and head of department. Among his students were Kathleen Hale, the creator of Orlando the Marmalade Cat: A Camping Holiday (1938) and its sequels, and C.H. Chapman, who went on to take over the drawing of Billy Bunter.

Seaby's illustrations are well known to post-war British children through his watercolours for two Ladybird books on British birds by Brian Vesey-Fitzgerald: British Birds and their Nests (1953) and A Second Book of British Birds and their Nests (1954).

Allen W. Seaby was the grandfather of noted wildlife illustrator and printmaker, Robert Gillmor.

== Pony stories ==
Seaby was an early exponent of the pony story for children, as Alison Haymonds points out:

In the 1920s there was a growing interest in native pony breeds and there was no stronger devotee than Allen W. Seaby, Professor of Fine Art at Reading University, who wrote a series of books on the main breeds, starting with Skewbald: The New Forest Pony (1923), illustrated with his own woodcuts and water colours. These nature books paved the way for scores of minor Black Beautys, the best of which was Golden Gorse’s Moorland Mousie (1929), illustrated by the great sporting artist Lionel Edwards.

Seaby's pony books were published between 1923 and 1949, and like many other interwar writers on equine themes, he produced both fiction and factual material. Seaby's pony books typically depict the life stories of native ponies, and are frequently episodic, with incidents such as the round up, or time in the circus being typical scenarios between the foal's birth on a mountain or moorland and old age. Where Seaby differs from most interwar pony story writers is in his perspective as a naturalist, observing the ponies’ behaviour, as compared to the more usual point of view which has the ponies being brought on as children's riding ponies. As Seaby comments, in the foreword to British Ponies: Running Wild and Ridden (1936):

Although I know it is an unpractical, uneconomic attitude, I myself am more interested in the pony on his native heath, untrammelled and free to go where he pleases.

Seaby wrote and illustrated six fiction titles about native ponies in their habitats between 1923 and 1948. Skewbald: The New Forest Pony (1923) and Sons of Skewbald (1937) are set in the New Forest. First published in 1928, Exmoor Lass contains six short stories exploring the lives of five of Britain's native pony breeds: the Exmoor, the Shetland, the New Forest, the Dartmoor and the Welsh. Dinah: The Dartmoor Pony (1935) is perhaps the most similar of Seaby's novels to the typical formulaic pony story: separated from her dam as a foal, Dinah finds her way onto a farm where twelve-year-old Dolly looks after her, eventually breaking her in, before winning two red rosettes in a local gymkhana. Sheltie: The Story of a Shetland Pony (1939) describes a young riding school owner's attempt to ride home from the Highlands to the South of England, leading Sheltie. Mona: The Welsh Pony (1948), set along the Mawddach estuary near Abermaw (Barmouth) and in the hills to the north, tells Mona's story from her birth on her native moorland, through her breaking-in and usage, and into older age.

== Non-fiction pony books ==
Two non-fiction titles were published in 1936 and 1949. The first, British Ponies: Running Wild and Ridden (1936), is a large format hardback book of drawings, and the second a paperback Puffin picture book, entitled Our Ponies (1949).

== Historical fiction for children ==
In addition to bird illustrations and pony books, Seaby also produced a number of historical books for children, which all demonstrate an underlying interest in archaeology, art history and landscape, as well as ponies. Omrig and Nerla (1934), for example, is set in the Bronze Age, and the novel opens with what is for Seaby quite familiar territory: herd behaviour, a challenge from a lone stallion and the birth of a foal.

In 1943 Seaby wrote and illustrated 'The Ninth Legion' (reprinted by Harrap 1948), drawing on contemporary understanding of ancient Roman Britain to tell an historical adventure story about the apparent loss of the Ninth Legion, which may have influenced Rosemary Sutcliff's 1954 historical adventure novel for children 'The Eagle of the Ninth'.

Seaby's 1943 novel The Ninth Legion

== Art history and technique ==
For students, Seaby produced a series on art history, and practical technique books relating to the art of the woodcut, for which he is most well-known. Reviewing the first in Seaby's series of books for art students, Art in the Life of Mankind (1928 onwards), in The Art Bulletin, Marguerite Wencelius noted a synthesis of ‘both idealistic feeling and scientific qualities of objectivity, clearness and precision’ (1929: 222). Seaby's Japanese-style woodblock print of Stonehenge is particularly striking.

== Reputation ==
Seaby's obituary in The Times (30 July 1953: 8) paid tribute above all to his ability to synthesise art and nature: his "studies of wildlife", the writer noted, are significant for the way in which "naturalistic truth is combined with decorative disposition", and "nobody could fail to be impressed by the illustrations in such books as Skewbald: The New Forest Pony; British Ponies; and The White Buck". Cathy Sloan concludes in an article for Nature in Art that Seaby's work bridges ‘the gap between fine art and so called "wildlife art"’ (1995: 10). Pierre Gusman admired his woodcuts in the Japanese style, and compared him with John Dickson Batten, William Giles and Sydney Lee in that field.

== Bibliography ==
=== As author/illustrator ===
- (1923) Skewbald: The New Forest Pony. London: A. & C. Black.
- (1925) The Roman Alphabet and its Derivatives. London B.T. Batsford.
- (1928) Art in the Life of Mankind: A Survey of its Achievements from the Earliest Times. Vol. 1. London: B.T. Batsford.
- (1928) Exmoor Lass and Other Pony Stories. London: A. & C. Black.
- (1934) Omrig and Nerla. London: George G. Harrap.
- (1935) Dinah: The Dartmoor Pony. London: A. & C. Black.
- (1936) British Ponies: Running Wild and Ridden. London: A. & C. Black.
- (1937) Sons of Skewbald, or Castor and Pollux. London: A. & C. Black.
- (1939) Sheltie: The Story of a Shetland Pony. London A. & C. Black.
- (1939) The White Buck: A New Forest Story. London: Thomas Nelson & Sons.
- (1940) ‘A Dartmoor Bog’. In Cyril Swinson (ed.) Twenty Animal Stories. London: A. & C. Black. (First published in Exmoor Lass, 1928)
- (1947) Alfred's Jewel. London: George G. Harrap.
- (1948) Mona: The Welsh Pony. London: A. & C. Black.
- (1949) Our Ponies. Harmondsworth: Penguin (Puffin Picture Books).
- (1951) Blondel the Minstrel. London: Harrap.

=== As illustrator ===
- Kirkman, F.B. and Jourdain, F.C.R. (1910–1913) The British Bird Book. Vols. 1–4. London: T.C. and E.C. Jack.
- Burnett, M.E. (c. 1919) My First Book of Birds. London: Thomas Nelson.
- Cumming, Primrose (1934) Doney: A Borderland Tale of Ponies and Young People. London: Country Life.
- Vesey-Fitzgerald, Brian (1953) British Birds and their Nests. Loughborough: Wills & Hepworth (Ladybird).
- Vesey-Fitzgerald, Brian (1954) A Second Book of British Birds and their Nests. Loughborough: Wills & Hepworth (Ladybird).
