= Temperley =

Temperley may refer to:

- Temperley, Argentina, a city in the province of Buenos Aires, Argentina, that forms part of the Greater Buenos Aires metro area.
- Temperley (surname)
- Club Atlético Temperley, Temperley, Buenos Aires, Argentina; a sports club, and soccer team
- Temperley station, Temperley, Buenos Aires, Argentina; a train station

== See also ==
- Temperley–Lieb algebra, an algebra from which are built certain transfer matrices, invented by Neville Temperley and Elliott Lieb
- The House of Temperley, a 1913 British silent drama film directed by Harold M. Shaw
- Timperley (disambiguation)
