= Timperley (disambiguation) =

Timperley is a suburban village in Altrincham, Trafford, Greater Manchester, England

Timperley may also refer to:

== Places ==
- Timperley (ward), Trafford, Greater Manchester, England; an electoral ward of Trafford Council
- Timperley tram stop, Timperley, Trafford, Greater Manchester, England; a tram stop on the Altrincham Line of Metrolink
- Timperley Hall, Trafford, Greater Manchester, England; a 16th-century manor house

== Other uses ==
- Timperley (surname)

== See also ==
- Timperley Central, Trafford, Greater Manchester, England; an electoral ward of Trafford Council
- Timperley North, Trafford, Greater Manchester, England; an electoral ward of Trafford Council
- West Timperley railway station, Broadheath, Cheshire, England
- Stockport, Timperley and Altrincham Junction Railway, England
- Temperley (disambiguation)
