= Brian Vesey-Fitzgerald =

British naturalist & writer (1905-1981)

Brian Percy Seymour Vesey-Fitzgerald (5 July 1905 – 23 October 1981) was an English naturalist, a writer and editor of books on wildlife, cats, and dogs.

== Early life ==
Vesey-Fitzgerald was born in Denbighshire, North Wales, in July 1905, the son of Edward Percy Seymour Vesey-Fitzgerald (1853–1924) and his second wife Mary Bridget Jones. He was christened into the Church in Wales at St Mark's, Wrexham, on 31 July 1905, when his father's status was noted as "Political Agent (India)". He was a grandson of Sir Seymour Vesey-FitzGerald, who was an illegitimate son of William Vesey-FitzGerald, 2nd Baron FitzGerald and Vesey. His father James Fitzgerald (1742–1835) married Catherine, a daughter of the Rev. Henry Vesey, who was created in her own right Baroness FitzGerald and Vesey.

The young Vesey-Fitzgerald had a full sister, Sheila Bridget, born in 1907. In 1910, he wore a white satin suit as a page boy at a wedding in Westminster.

== Life and work ==
Vesey-Fitzgerald began his career as a journalist with Reuters. He then became the naturalist and boxing correspondent on the staff of The Field magazine, becoming editor from 1938 to 1946. He then devoted his time to writing and broadcasting. Apart from wildlife, cats, and dogs, he took particular interests in countryside life in general, gypsies, fairgrounds, and boxing. He showed sympathy with both poachers and gamekeepers.

In August 1937, Vesey-Fitzgerald argued for the extermination of the rabbit.

He was the author of the New Naturalist volume British Game (1946). He wrote a weekly column about cats and dogs in the News of the World. His radio broadcasts about country life included Field Fare (1940-1945) and There and Back (1947-1949).

Vesey-Fitzgerald was an acknowledged authority on gypsies and was President of the British Fairground Society. He was a member of the National Cat Club and an honorary Vice-President of the Siamese Cat Club of South Africa.

He was editor of the 60 volume series County Books which were published in the years 1947-53 and of the 31 volume series The Regional Books which were published during the 1950s.

== Personal life ==
In September 1931, at Wilcot near Pewsey, Vesey-Fitzgerald married Amy Catherine Nash, a daughter of the Rev. P. A. Nash. In June 1957, his mother, Bridget Vesey-Fitzgerald, died. His wife Amy Vesey-Fitzgerald died in October 1960, aged 57 leaving money of her own.

By the end of his life, Vesey-Fitzgerald was living at Wrecclesham in Surrey, where he died on 23 October 1981, leaving an estate valued for probate at £16,619.

== Books ==
A selection of books by Brian Vesey-Fitzgerald:

- A Book of British Waders (1939)
- Hampshire Scene (1940)
- Programme For Agriculture (Editor) (1941)
- A Country Chronicle (1942)
- Hedgerow and Field (1943)
- Gypsies of Britain (1944)
- British Game: New Naturalist No. 2 (1946)
- The Book Of The Horse (1946)
- The British Countryside in Pictures (1946)
- Birds Trees and Flowers Illustrated: The Nature Lover's Companion to Familiar British Birds, Trees and Flowers, fully Illustrated with Photographs, Drawings and Colour Plates, by Brian Vesey-Fitzgerald and others (1947)
- The Book of the Dog (1948)
- It's My Delight (1948)
- Background to Birds (1948)
- Bird Biology for Beginners, illus. L. R. Brightwell (1948)
- British Bats, illus. Eric Ennion (1949)
- The Senses of Bats (1949)
- Rivermouth, illus. Charles Tunnicliffe (1949)
- The Hampshire Avon (1950)
- British Birds and Their Nests, illus. Allen W. Seaby. (1950)
- Fly Fishing by Turing, H.D. (Editor) (1951)
- The Regional Books, a series of 31 volumes (Editor) (1952 - 1958)
- The First Ladybird Book of British Birds and their Nests, illus. Allen W. Seaby (1953)
- The Second Ladybird Book of British Birds and their Nests, illus. Allen W. Seaby (1955)
- The Third Ladybird Book of British Birds and their Nests (1956)
- The Ladybird Book of British Wild Flowers (1957)
- Cats (Penguin Handbooks) (1957)
- The Beauty of Cats (1958)
- The Beauty of Dogs (1960)
- Garden Flowers (Natural History), illus. John Leigh-Pemberton (1960)
- A Bohemian Affair - short stories, etc. (1961)
- The Ladybird Book of Trees, illus. S. R. Badmin (1963)
- About Dogs (1963)
- Animal Anthology (1965)
- Best Animal Stories (1965)
- Portrait of the New Forest (1966)
- The World of Ants, Bees and Wasps (1969)
- Town Fox, Country Fox (Survival Books) (1965)
