= Edward Storey =

English poet, dramatist, and writer (1930–2018)

Edward Storey (28 February 1930 – 18 November 2018), was an English poet, dramatist and non-fiction writer. He was born at Whittlesey, part of the Isle of Ely in Cambridgeshire. The Fens inspired much of his work.

== Early career ==
Before becoming a full-time writer in the late 1960s, Storey completed National Service and worked in adult education for the Peterborough City Education Authority and the Workers' Educational Association (WEA). His first poetry volume (North Bank Night) appeared in 1969 in the Phoenix Living Poets series.

In an early work, Portrait of the Fen Country (1971), Storey reflected on his childhood understanding of the world as shaped by his Fenland experience. In Fen Boy First (1992), published by Robert Hale Ltd, he gave an account of growing up in Whittlesey and in Fen Country Christmas (1995) he collected a number of stories, legends and fenland superstitions. He was a founder member of the John Clare Society and the literature panel of the Eastern Arts Association.

== Wales ==
Storey moved to Wales in 1999. For many years he chaired the Friends of St Michael's, the church next to his home in Discoed, engaged in fundraising to restore the building and support other arts events. New poetry collections, inspired by the local border country and other sources, were published by the Friends of St Michael's under the imprint of The Leverett Press.

Edward Storey died at his home in Discoed early on the morning of 18 November 2018. The funeral service was held at St Michaels on 5 December.

== Set to music ==
Edward Storey's poems and libretti have been set to music by Trevor Hold, Adrian Williams, David Twigg, Cecilia MacDowell, Trevor Jones, Gabriel Jackson and others, leading to performances and/or recordings. Recent CD recordings of musical settings of Edward's poems are 'Pure Music' featuring Voller String Quartet and mezzo-soprano Zarah Hible, and 'Spirit Songs' featuring soprano Louise Wayman accompanied by pianist Sarah Gard. The music on these recording is by Trevor Jones.

== Appreciation ==
- "A deeply meditative poet who sees in nature a mirror for the human condition and sensibility.. these are beautifully crafted poems that exist because they have to." (The Poetry Quarterly Review)
- "You won't find a poet who can quite do what Storey does." (Envoi)
- "Effortless in its voice, language and poetic form, and in its relationship with the reader... never slight nor dependent on conventional sentiment, but marked by grace or gravitas." (Ambit)

== Bibliography ==
- Keeping an Eye on Things, edited by Edward Storey, illustrated by John Gillette (1982, The Children's Society)
- Call it a Summer Country (1978, Robert Hale Ltd)
- Portrait of the Fen Country (1971, Robert Hale Ltd)
- The Winter Fens (1993, Robert Hale Ltd)
- Four Seasons in Three Countries(1974, Robert Hale Ltd)
- North Bank Night (1969, 2nd impression 1970, Chatto & Windus. Poetry)
- A Man in Winter (1972, Chatto & Windus. Poetry)
- The Dark Music (1979, Annakin Fine Arts Ltd. Poetry)
- A Slant of Light (1983, Free Man's Press. Poetry)
- Fen Boy First (1992, Robert Hale Ltd)
- Summer Journeys through the Fens (1992, Robert Hale Ltd)
- Fen Country Christmas (1995, Robert Hale Ltd)
- Fen, Fire and Flood: Scenes from Fenland History (1986, Cambridgeshire Libraries Publications)
- Letters from the Fens (1998–1999, ISIS. Large Print Books)
- Last Train to Ely (1995, Rockingham Press Poetry)
- In Fen Country Heaven (1996–1997, Robert Hale Ltd)
- A Right to Song: The Life of John Clare (1982, Methuen Publishing Ltd)
- The Solitary Landscape (1975, Victor Gollancz Ltd)
- Spirit of the Fens (1985, Robert Hale Ltd)
- A Change in the Climate (1988. Poetry)
- Lighting a Beacon (2003, Kites Drift, Discoed, limited edition of 150)
- New and Selected Poems (2004, Rockingham Press. Poetry)
- Missing the Point (2004. Poetry)
- Border Music (2006. Poetry)
- A Discoed Book of Hours (2013, The Leverett Press. Poetry)
- Almost a Chimechild (2010, Raven Books)
- Seeing the Light [Poetry] (2015, The Leverett Press)
