= Gillie Potter =

British comedian

- Born: 14 September 1887; Bedford, England
- Died: 4 March 1975 (aged 87)
- Education: Bedford Modern School
- Alma mater: Worcester College, Oxford

Hugh William Peel (14 September 1887 – 4 March 1975), better known as Gillie Potter, was an English comedian and broadcaster.

== Life ==
He was born in Bedford to Brignal Peel (died 1933), a Wesleyan minister, and Elizabeth Stimson. He was educated at Bedford Modern School and for a time at Worcester College, Oxford.

Potter first performed in Edwin Milton Royle's The White Man at the Lyric Theatre in London before touring. In 1915 he was George Robey's understudy at the Alhambra. During the First World War he served in the Royal Field Artillery and was commissioned as a second lieutenant in February 1917. He returned to music hall after the war. He cultivated an individual style and persona, wearing a straw boater, wide grey flannel trousers (he claimed he invented the Oxford bags style at the London Coliseum in 1920), and an "Old Borstolian" blazer, and carried a notebook with a rolled umbrella. James Agate described him as "that sham Harrovian who bears upon his blazer the broad arrows of a blameful life".

Potter spoke to his audience in "deadpan tones on unlikely and esoteric themes peppered with literary, historical, and linguistic allusion. Though a classical education was needed fully to appreciate his act, it was widely popular: in 1930 he appeared in the Royal Variety Performance, and made at least one radio broadcast (on 1 May). He became one of the most popular radio entertainers in Britain, with his famous opening lines: "Good evening England. This is Gillie Potter speaking to you in English". Potter's humour had echoes of Punch and 'Beachcomber' and various times included the adventures of "my brother who was educated at Borstal", burlesques of "society snippets", and parodies of Who's Who entries. His most famous turns were his tales of the mythical English village of Hogsnorton, named after the Oxfordshire village where "pigs play on the organ".

The combination of "mock erudition, absurdity, and nostalgia struck a chord with inter-war audiences and made him a household name". Just before the Second World War the BBC evacuated most of its staff to Wood Norton Hall, near Evesham; this new base became known as Hogsnorton.

In 1940, Potter lamented the decline of music hall entertainment and foreign influences:

...the music-hall is no longer in existence. It was essentially a national institution: no foreigner except as a first or last turn—and that a dumb one—had any place in it. It reflected in general the life of the nation; that of the people in particular. The Italian acrobats may have come first and the German strong men appeared last, but between such foreign covers came page after page that only British eyes might read aright, for the language of the music-hall was understanded of the people. Its successor is the Variety Theatre; a dual misnomer since it is never a theatre and its fare is ever unvaried—the alien crooner, the alien comic: the fatuous and the filthy...Elgar and Sullivan and German belong to "Merrie England," to the age, in short, of the music-hall, and can have no place in programmes designed for this era of Priestley and "Penguins" when the British public remains unentertained unless basking in the limelight of a benevolent internationalism.

He continued to broadcast through the war but his style went out of fashion in the post-war years. His last radio series was broadcast in 1952, titled Mr. Gillie Potter and his last broadcasts as a comedian on radio were for Coronation at Hogsnorton in 1953. That year he also appeared on television for A Little of What you Fancy. His last broadcast appearance was in the panel game Sounds Familiar in 1970.

He deplored what he believed were the BBC's decline in moral standards and so became a spokesman for the Popular Television Association which campaigned in the early 1950s for a commercial television station as an alternative to the BBC. He also thought of standing for election to the House of Commons as an independent candidate on the platform of "England for the English", specifically in relation to theatre.

Other than comedy, Englishness was the abiding passion for Potter, being an authority on heraldry, genealogy, and church history, a Knight Templar, a member of the Middle Temple and the Society of Genealogists, a vice-president of the Royal Society of St George and the Society of King Charles the Martyr, as well as for many years parish clerk of the church of St Botolph's Aldgate, London.

== Family ==
Potter married Beatrice Fanny Scott. They had a son and a daughter. The son, J. H. B. Peel, became a Daily Telegraph writer on country matters.
