= Timperley (surname) =

Timperley is a surname.

== Persons ==
Notable people with the surname include:

- Charles Henry Timperley (1794–1869), British printer and writer
- Harold Timperley, multiple people
  - Harold John Timperley (1898–1954), Australian journalist
  - H. W. Timperley (1890–1964; Harold William Timperley), British author
- Helen Timperley, New Zealand professor of education
- John Timperley (disambiguation), multiple people
  - John Timperley (badminton) (1931-2013), British badminton and squash player
  - John Timperley (civil engineer) (1796-1856), British civil engineer
  - John Timperley (sound engineer) (1940–2006), British audio engineer
- June Timperley (née White), British badminton player
- Rosemary Timperley (1920–1988), British novelist
- Thomas Timperley, British politician, MP for Great Yarmouth and Bramber (UK Parliament constituency)
- William Timperley (disambiguation), multiple people
  - William Timperley (politician) (1525–1606), English politician, MP for Lichfield
  - William Timperley (magistrate) (1833–1909; William Henry Timperley), Australian politician, author, policeman

== Characters ==
- Minnie Timperley, a fictional character from the song The Night That Minnie Timperley Died

== See also ==
- Temperley (disambiguation)
