= About Britain =

1951 book series

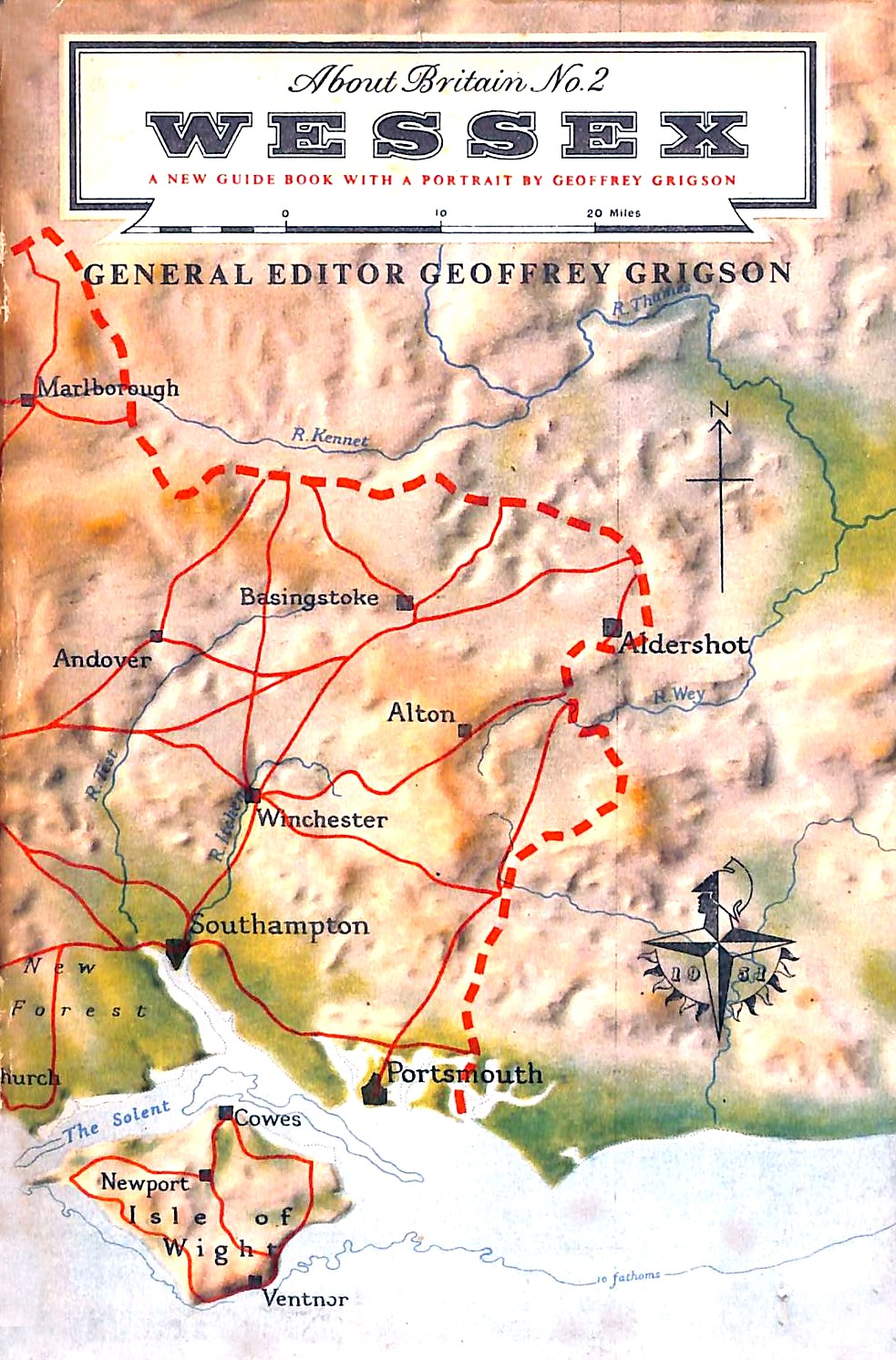
About Britain No. 2 Wessex by Geoffrey Grigson

About Britain is a series of 13 books published by Collins for the Festival of Britain in 1951 under the general editorship of Geoffrey Grigson who also wrote the first two volumes in the series.

== Titles ==
1. West Country by Geoffrey Grigson
2. Wessex by Geoffrey Grigson
3. Home Counties by R. S. R. Fitter
4. East Anglia by R. H. Mottram
5. Chilterns to Black Country by W. G. Hoskins
6. South Wales and the Marches by W. J. Gruffydd
7. North Wales and the Marches by W. J Gruffydd
8. East Midlands and the Peak by W. G. Hoskins
9. Lancashire and Yorkshire by Leo Walmsley
10. The Lakes to Tyneside by Sid Chaplin
11. The Lowlands of Scotland by John R. Allan
12. Highlands and Islands of Scotland by Alastair M. Dunnett
13. Northern Ireland by E. Estyn Evans
