= Charles Murray (poet) =

Scottish poet (1864–1941)

- Murray in the 1880s
- Born: 27 September 1864
- Died: 12 April 1941 (aged 76)
- Occupation: Poet
- Known for: Hamewith (1900)

Charles Murray (27 September 1864 – 12 April 1941) was a poet who wrote in the Doric dialect of Scots. He was one of three rural poets from the north-east of Scotland, the others being Flora Garry and John C. Milne, who did much to validate the literary use of Scots.

== Biography ==
Charles Murray was born and raised in Alford in north-east Scotland. However he wrote much of his poetry while living in South Africa where he spent most of his working life as a successful civil engineer. His first volume, A Handful of Heather (1893), was privately printed and he withdrew it shortly after publication to rework many of the poems within it. His second volume, Hamewith (1900), was much more successful. It was republished five times before he died and it is this volume for which he is best known. The title of the volume, which means Homewards in English, reflects his expatriate situation.

He served in the Armed Forces during the Second Boer War and the First World War and in 1917 produced the volume, The Sough o' War. The poems from this anthology were entitled: Ye're better men, A sough o' war, Wha bares a blade for Scotland?, To the hin'most man, The thraws o' fate, The wife on the war, Fae France, Bundle an' go, When will the war be by?, Dockens afore his peers, At the loanin' mou', Lat's hear the pipes, Hairy hears fae hame, and Furth again.

He published his last volume, In the Country Places, in 1920. After his death a final volume of poetry, Last Poems was published by the Charles Murray Memorial Trust in 1969.

He returned to Scotland when he retired in 1924 and settled in Banchory, not far from where he was brought up. There he died in 1941.

== See also ==
- Doric dialect (Scotland)
