= Flora Garry =

Scottish poet

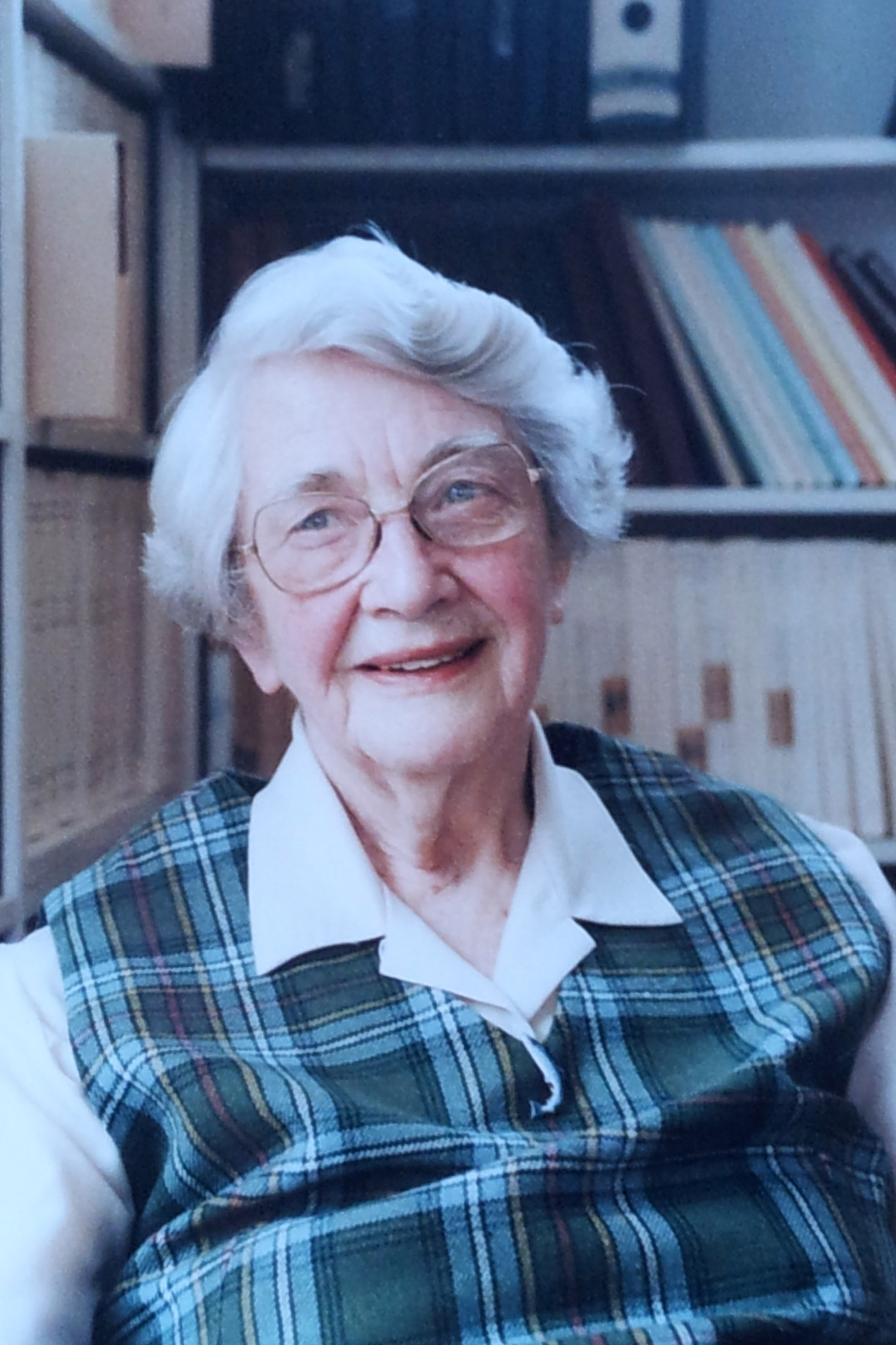
- Born: Flora Macdonald Campbell; 1900; Aberdeenshire, Scotland
- Died: 2000 (aged 99–100); Comrie, Perthshire, Scotland
- Occupation: Poet
- Known for: The Professor's Wife

Flora Garry (30 September 1900 – 16 June 2000) was a Scottish poet who mostly wrote in the Scots dialect of Aberdeenshire. Well known for her poetry, she played an important role along with Charles Murray and John C. Milne in validating the literary use of Scots.

== Biography ==
Flora Garry was the daughter of Archie Campbell, a freelance writer who used the nom de plume of "The Buchan Farmer", and Helen Campbell, who wrote plays for radio. She was brought up at Mains of Auchmunziel, near to New Deer, Buchan in Abderdeenshire. She went to school in New Deer, then went on to the Peterhead Academy and the University of Aberdeen. She became a school teacher, and taught at Dumfries and Strichen. She married Robert Campbell Garry, who was the first to use insulin in Scotland while a house doctor at Western Infirmary, Glasgow and who became Regius Professor of Physiology at the University of Glasgow. They had one son, Frank.

Flora Garry did not start to write poetry until World War II, and did not publish anything until she was an old age pensioner. Explaining why she began writing poetry so late, she said that just as happiness has no history, neither does it write poetry. She corresponded with Edith Anne Robertson (1883–1973), another Aberdeenshire poet who wrote in the Scots tongue. Her verse collection Bennygoak was first published in 1974. She spent her last years in Comrie, Perthshire, dying there on 16 June 2000 after outliving her husband and her son.

== Work ==
Flora Garry loved the gently rolling farming country of Buchan, which she celebrated in her poetry. Although she wrote fine English, her full talent emerged in her work in the local Buchan dialect. Most of the writers in Scots in the first half of the twentieth century were well educated and of middle-class background. They respected the Scots language but it was not their native tongue. Flora Garry was unusual in that as a child she probably spoke the language she later used in her poetry. A reviewer has said that her Doric poetry is written "with a sure touch and a sharp eye." Another has said she was "one of the most uncompromising of recent dialect poets; but the great affection in which she and her work are locally held is clear evidence not only for the vitality of her Doric as a poetic medium but for the strength of the folk-memory of traditional NE farming life."

== Bibliography ==
- Garry, Flora (1975). Bennygoak and Other Poems. Rainbow Books. p. 47. ISBN 978-0-9503025-5-3.
- Garry, Flora (June 1995). Collected poems. Gordon Wright. p. 79. ISBN 978-0-903065-82-5.

== Reviews ==
- Garioch, Robert (1980), review of Bennygoak and Other Poems, in Burnett, Ray (ed.), Calgacus 2, Summer 1975, p. 54, ISSN 0307-2029
- Stephen, Ian (1996), review of Collected Poems, in Bryan, Tom (ed.), Northwords, Issue 9, Ross and Cromarty District Council, p. 39, ISSN 0964-6876
