= Newport Castle, Pembrokeshire =

Castle in Pembrokeshire, Wales

Newport Castle
- Castell Trefdraeth (Welsh)
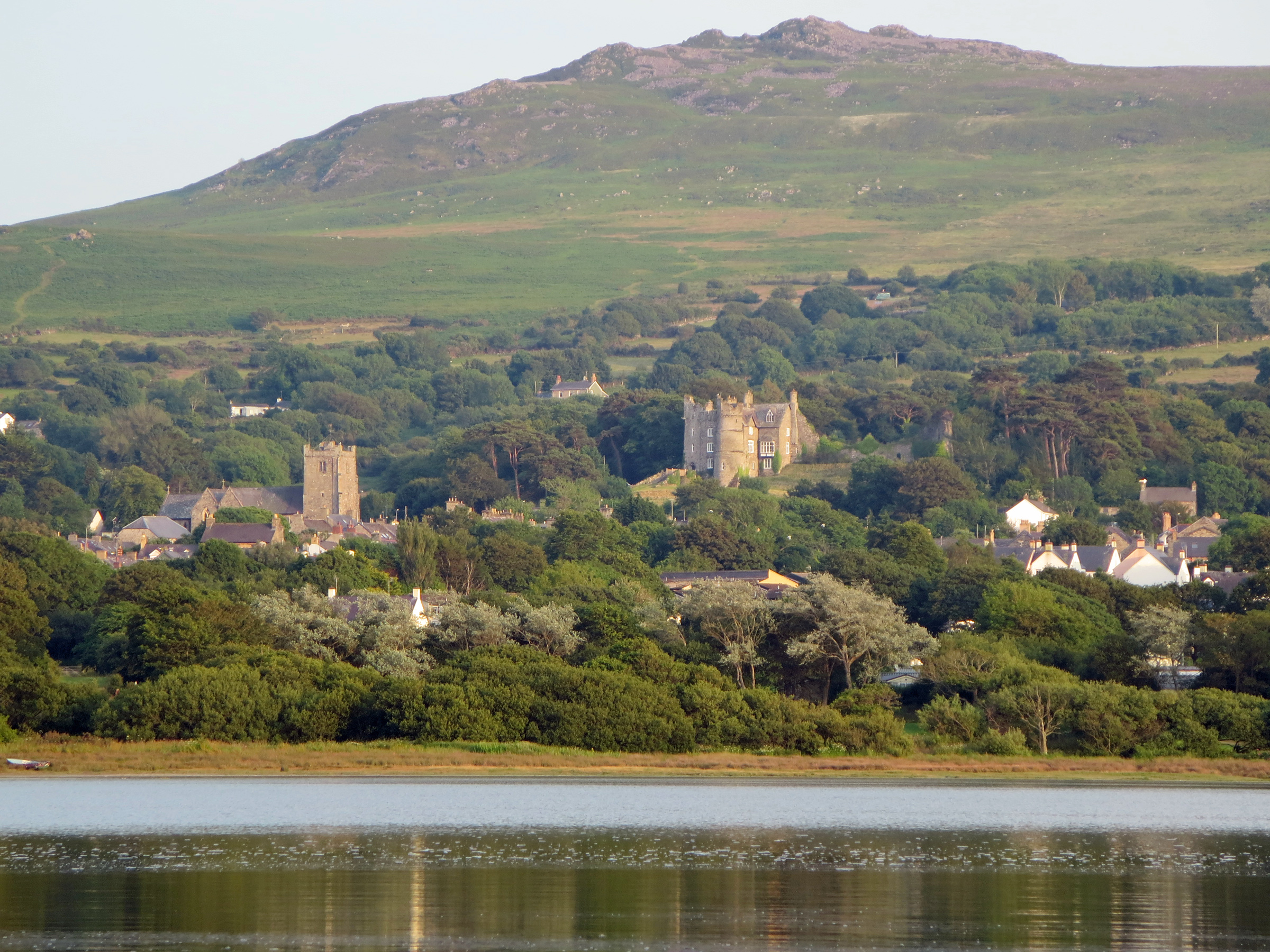

- Location within Pembrokeshire

General information
- Location: Newport, Pembrokeshire, Wales
- Coordinates: 52°00′51″N 4°49′58″W

Listed Building – Grade I
- Official name: Newport Castle
- Designated: 16 January 1952
- Reference no.: 13083

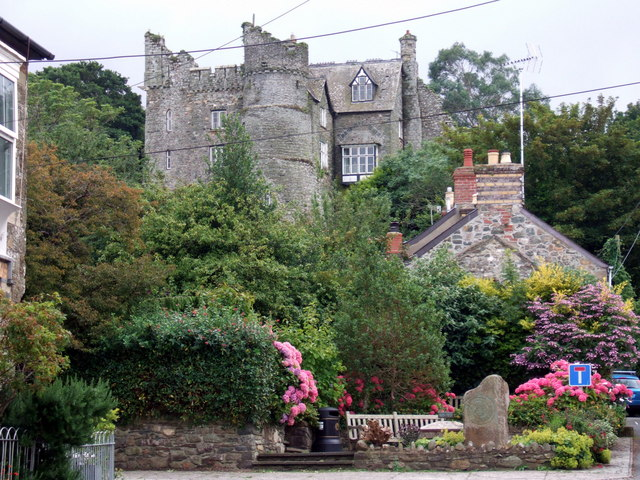
Castell Drefdraeth-Newport castle in summertime

Newport Castle (Welsh: Castell Trefdraeth) is a castle located in Newport, Pembrokeshire, Wales. The earliest castle on the site was built in the 13th century, and the present structure was built in the 19th century and is a private residence.

== Background ==
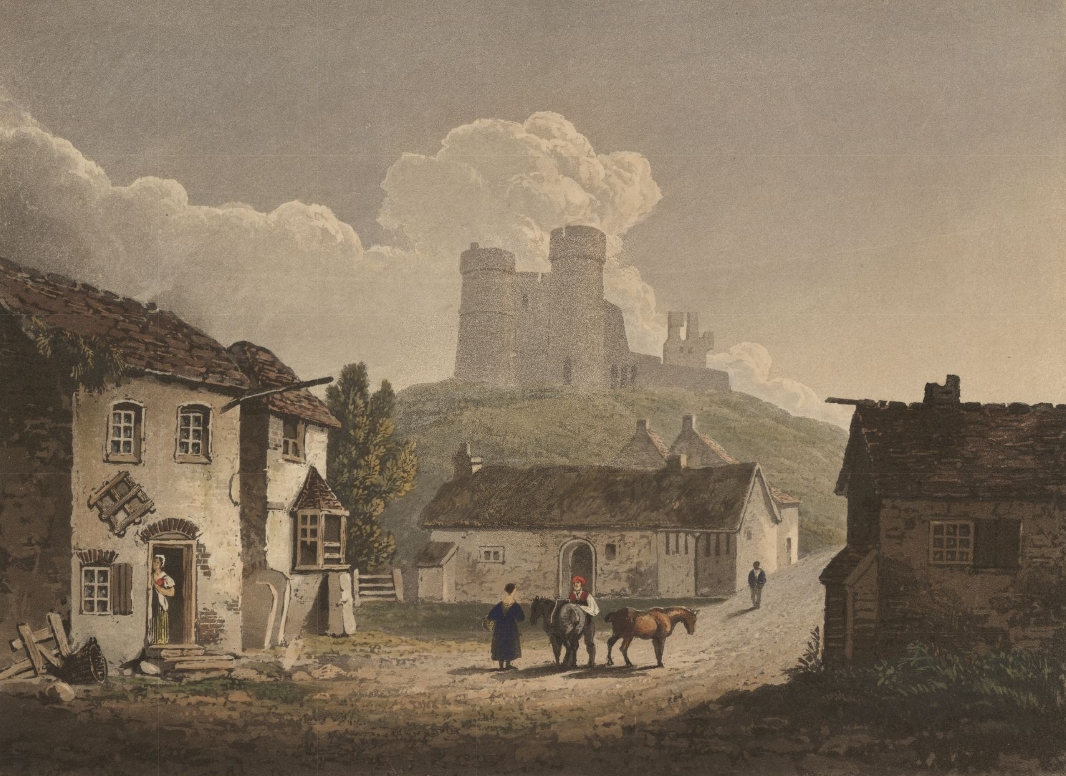
Newport, Pembrokeshire

Following the death of the ruler of Deheubarth, Rhys ap Tewdwr, his lands were seized by the Normans. Most of Northern Dyfed, except for lands owned by the Bishop of St. Davids—Dewisland—was taken by Martin de Turribus, who became the first Marcher Lord of Kemes. Martin's caput was at Nevern Castle, which passed to his son, Robert fitz Martin. In 1197, Robert's son, William fitz Martin abandoned Nevern, founded Newport, moved the Marcher Lordship's headquarters there, and constructed Newport Castle.

== 13th and 14th centuries ==
The castle was captured by Llywelyn the Great in 1215 and Llywelyn the Last in 1257 but on both occasions was recaptured by the Fitz Martins.

In 1326, two years after his similarly named father, the reigning Lord Martin (the Fitz having been dropped earlier in the previous century) died childless, and the Lordship was inherited by his sister, Joan. Ownership of the castle was thus transferred to Joan and her husband, James Audley.

== 15th and 16th centuries ==
The castle suffered extensive damage during the Glyndwr Rising at the start of the 15th century. The castle was temporarily transferred to the crown at the end of the century, in 1497, when the then Lord Audley, James, was executed for high treason and all his lands seized, but these were returned to his son John in 1534; the following year the status of Marcher Lordship was abolished by the Laws in Wales Acts.

In 1539, John sold the castle; the buyer was a successful local lawyer, William Owen of Henllys (father of the antiquarian George Owen).

== 19th century to date ==
A three-storey private residence was built in 1859 on the site of the castle's gate-house, as part of renovations carried out by the owner at the time, Sir Thomas Lloyd, during which one of the flanking towers of the gatehouse was demolished. Three other towers at the corners of the building remain, along with a curtain wall.

The castle was listed with Grade I status on 16 January 1952. Today, the building remains in private ownership and is not open to the public.
