= Edith Anne Robertson =

Scottish poet (1883–1973)

- Born: Edith Anne Stewart; 1883; Glasgow
- Died: 1973 (aged 89–90)
- Occupation: Poet
- Known for: Collected ballads and poems in the Scots tongue

Edith Anne Robertson (10 Jan 1883 – 31 Jan 1973) was a Scottish poet who wrote in both the English and Scots tongues.

== Biography ==
Edith Anne Stewart was born in Glasgow, to Jane Louisa Faulds and Robert Stewart, a civil engineer. She attended the Glasgow High School for Girls. Her family lived in Germany and in Surrey, England, during her childhood.

In 1919 she married the Rev. Professor James Alexander Robertson of Aberdeen, also the child of a Free Church Minister. They moved to Aberdeen, where James obtained a position as Professor of New Testament Language, Literature and Theology at the United Free Church College in Aberdeen. He wrote a number of well-received works on the New Testament, and was said to have been an effective preacher.

In 1938 James was appointed Professor of Biblical Criticism at the University of Aberdeen. He remained there until he was forced to retire in 1945 due to poor health.

James Alexander Robertson died in 1955. Edith lived on for almost twenty years.

== Work ==
Edith Anne Robertson's work reflects her strong belief in Christianity and her interest in the culture and language of the north east of Scotland. In 1930 she published Carmen Jesu Nazereni, a verse version of the gospels. She also published a life of Francis Xavier. Later she published two collections of poems by Walter de la Mare and Gerard Manley Hopkins that she had translated into the Scots language. She corresponded with many literary figures including Marion Angus, David Daiches, Flora Garry, Nan Shepherd, Douglas Young and Samuel Beckett.

Her poem The Scots Tongue (1955) gives her thoughts on the language that she loved:

Gin I'm a livan tongue loe me;
Saebins we'll hae mair bairns;
Gin I'm a deid tongue nae call for keenin,
Ye'll find me wi the gods
Ayont the Reaveries o Time:
Yon are the gowden tongues!

In 1953 Douglas Young wrote to Edith Anne Robertson of her Voices that it was "a truly astonishing challenge to those who think the Lallans incapable of conveying thought (as E. Muir incautiously maintained in 'Scott and Scotland') and incapable of expressing subtleties of feeling (as MacCraig too often assents). Moreover it does fill the gap I emphasised (in my Nelson anthology), when I remarked on the comparative lack of mystical verse in Scots." A critic wrote in the Scottish international Review that "in verse, Edith Anne Robertson used a supple and graceful Scots, carrying a large vocabulary with apparent ease in well-varied metres."

== Bibliography ==
- Stewart, Edith Anne (1917). The Life of St. Francis Xavier: Evangelist, Explorer, Mystic. Headley bros. Limited.
- Robertson, Edith Ann (1930). He is Become My Song: Carmen Jesu Nazareni. Macmillan. p. 275. ASIN B002FBEV1Q.
- Robertson, Edith Ann (1930). Francis Xavier,: Knight errant of the cross, 1506–1552. Student Christian movement press. p. 207. ASIN B0006ALDBO.
- Robertson, Edith Ann (1955). Voices frae the city o trees: and ither voices frae nearbye. M. MacDonald. p. 63. ASIN B001IQ4P42.
- Robertson, Edith Ann (1955). Poems Frae the Suddron o Walter de la Mare made ower intil Scots by Edith Anne Robertson, with a Foreword by Walter de la Mare. M MacDonald. ASIN B004XSX5K2.
- Robertson, Edith Anne (1961), 'The Auld Bodach's Lament', in Thomson, David Cleghorn (ed.), Saltire Review, Vol. 6, No. 23, Winter 1961, The Saltire Society, p. 44.
- Robertson, Edith Anne (1967). Collected Ballads and Poems in the Scots Tongue. Illustrations by Ailie Matthews. Aberdeen University Press. p. 68. ISBN 0900015233.
- Robertson, Edith Anne (1968). Translations into the Scots Tongue of Poems by Gerard Manley Hopkins. Aberdeen University Press. ASIN B00353XH0E.
- Robertson, Edith Ann (1969). Forest voices, and other poems in English. Aberdeen University Press. p. 85. ISBN 0900015012.
- Robertson, Edith Ann. Mair like a dream, radio script describing life on Aberdeenshire farm, 1860–80. p. 168.
