= John Meredith Bellman =

British Army Officer

John Bellman
- Born: John Meredith Bellman; 27 May 1920; Newport, Pembrokeshire
- Died: 1998 Upavon, Wiltshire
- Awards: Military Cross with bar
- Education: Wellington College; Royal Military Academy, Woolwich

Brigadier John Meredith Bellman MC (1920–1998) was a British Army officer, known as "the Happy Brigadier". He was twice awarded the Military Cross during World War II. A career soldier, he rose to the rank of Brigadier and ended his career as aide-de-camp to Queen Elizabeth II.

== Early life ==
Bellman was born on 27 May 1920 in Newport, Pembrokeshire. He was the eldest son of Colonel John Francis Bellman MC and Elsie Bellman (née Hoskins). He was educated at Wellington College and Royal Military Academy, Woolwich.

== Career ==
Military cross with bar

Bellman was commissioned as a 2nd Lieutenant in the Royal Artillery in July 1939.

He served in the 4th Field Regiment in 1942, seeing action in Egypt at the First and Second Battle of El Alamein, Palestine, Iraq, India and Burma. In July 1944, Bellman, temporary captain at the time, was awarded the Military Cross for gallantry under fire during the Battle of the Western Tunnels during the Arakan campaign. On 11 August 1942, he was promoted to captain. Then in August, he was awarded the Military Cross again for actions at Nunshigam.

After the war, Bellman served on the staff in South East Asia Command, in Germany, and in Cyprus. He helped to set up the Berlin Air Lift. In 1950, he was serving as an adjutant with the 59th Heavy Anti-Aircraft Regiment. In July 1952, Bellman was promoted to Major.

He attended the Staff College, Camberley in 1952. He was then posted to 3 Royal Horse Artillery in Homs. He was posted to the War Office in 1956 and then Cyprus.

In 1961, Bellman was promoted to Lieutenant-Colonel and also appointed the commanding officer of 37th Guided Missile Regiment at Piddlehinton, where he commanded "32 officers and 260 [enlisted] men." In 1962, he made national news for abolishing bull polishing in his command, stating that "there is no room for bull in the modern army".

In 1964, Bellman was assigned to the War Office. In 1965, he was promoted from Lieutenant Colonel to Colonel.

In 1967, he was promoted to Brigadier, commanding 7th Artillery Brigade. In 1969, he was Garrison Commander at Dortmund. In 1972, he was appointed Commander, Royal Artillery at HQUK Land Forces.

In 1973, he was appointed aide-de-camp to Queen Elizabeth II. He retired in 1975.

== Retirement ==
After retirement, he served on Wiltshire County Council, raised funds for cancer research and assisted the British Heart Foundation. He also enjoyed playing golf, sailing and shooting.

== Personal life ==
In 1946, he married Pamela Rogerson in Leeds.

Bellman died in 1998.
