= Newport Bay (Wales) =

Bay in Pembrokeshire, Wales

Coordinates: 52°02′N 4°52′W

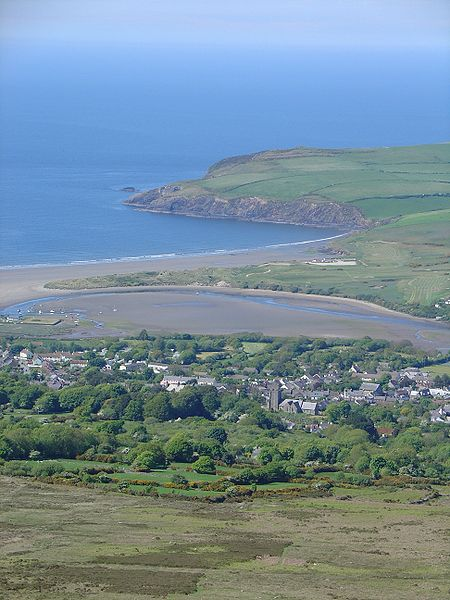
The town of Newport with the east side of Newport Bay beyond

Newport Bay (Welsh: Bae Trefdraeth) is a bay on a section of the north Pembrokeshire coast, Wales, which is within the Pembrokeshire Coast National Park. The bay is one of many in the much larger Cardigan Bay, and it stretches from Dinas Island (actually a peninsula) to the headland of Pen-y-bâl, two miles to the east. It is overlooked by the town of Newport and the River Nevern flows into the bay.

== Features ==
Several smaller inlets formed by small stream outlets pierce its southern shore whilst in the southeast it is backed by Newport Sands, a beach which extends across the mouth of the River Nevern (Welsh: Afon Nyfer) estuary.

Navigation beacons stand on the hill to the north, and close by there is a waterfall known as Pen Pistyll where a stream drops about 15 metres (49 ft) to the beach. At the northern extremity of the sands there are caves. There are disused lime kilns on either side of the estuary. A lifeboat station (now a private residence) was operated from a beach known as The Cwm to the west of Parrog in the early 20th century.

The Pembrokeshire Coast Path, itself a part of the longer Wales Coast Path, runs around the bay, taking a detour inland at the estuary to cross using the lowermost road bridge.

== Settlements ==
Immediately south of the river estuary is the town of Newport and its associated ancient but now little-used port area of Parrog. The hamlet of Cwm-yr-Eglwys is at the southwest corner of the bay.

== Facilities ==
Newport Links Golf Club extends across the dune system at the east side of the bay, and there is a sailing club near the river's mouth.
