= Newport, Pembrokeshire =

Town, parish and community in Pembrokeshire, Wales

Newport: Welsh: Trefdraeth
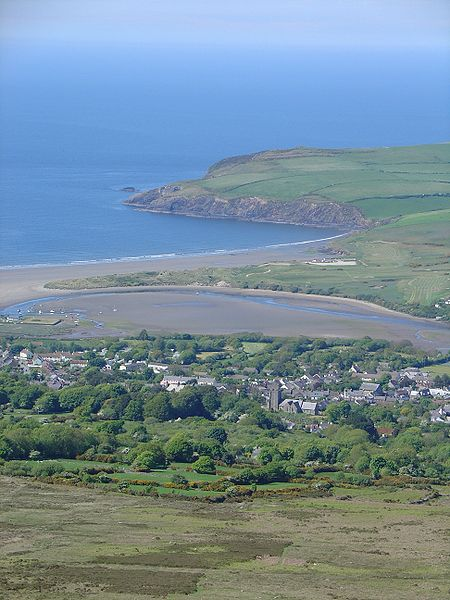
- Newport and Nevern estuary

- Location within Pembrokeshire
- Population: 1,161 (2011 census)
- OS grid reference: SN055395
- Community: Newport
- Principal area: Pembrokeshire
- Preserved county: Dyfed
- Country: Wales
- Sovereign state: United Kingdom
- Post town: NEWPORT
- Postcode district: SA42
- Dialling code: 01239
- Police: Dyfed-Powys
- Fire: Mid and West Wales
- Ambulance: Welsh
- UK Parliament: Ceredigion Preseli
- Senedd Cymru – Welsh Parliament: Ceredigion Penfro
- List of places UK Wales Pembrokeshire 52.01975°N 4.83607°W Map of the community

Newport (Welsh: Trefdraeth, meaning: "town by the beach") is a town, community, electoral ward and ancient port of Parrog, on the Pembrokeshire coast in West Wales at the mouth of the River Nevern (Welsh: Afon Nyfer) in the Pembrokeshire Coast National Park. The town gives its name to Newport Bay.

A popular tourist destination, Newport town straddles the Fishguard to Cardigan (A487) road, while the old port area hosts beach, water and other activities.

== History ==
The town was founded by the Norman William FitzMartin (c. 1155 – 1209) in about 1197. He was a son-in-law of the Lord Rhys, who nevertheless expelled him from his former base at nearby Nevern, which had been established by his father Robert fitz Martin. William founded Newport as the new capital of the Marcher Lordship of Cemais and it was a busy port founded primarily on the growing medieval wool trade. Despite seizure from the native Welsh, it remained within the FitzMartin family until the death of William, the 2nd Lord Martin, who died without a male heir in 1326.

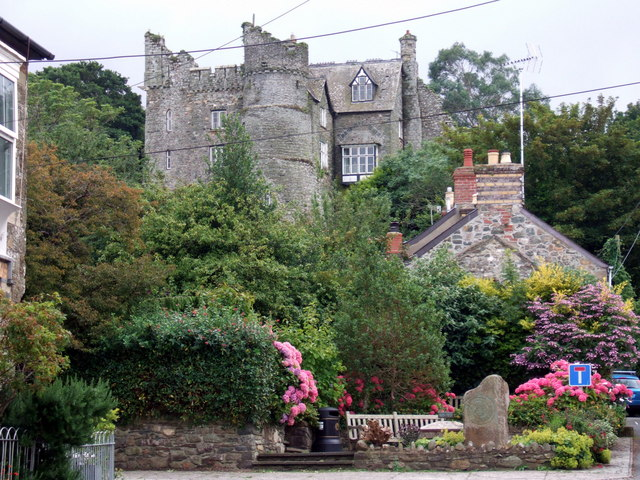
Newport Castle

Newport Castle, built by FitzMartin, is situated on a spur of Carn Ingli which overlooks Newport and much of the surrounding countryside. Though in ruins since at least the 17th century, it is impressive due to its situation; a house incorporating the castle walls, which faces west over the town, the bay and the Irish Sea, is still inhabited.

In the town is a significant mediaeval pottery kiln from the 15th century, believed to be the only intact example in Britain; finds include jugs, pots, ridge tiles and distilling equipment. Excavation was funded by the Heritage Lottery Fund in 2017.

Newport appears prominently on a 1578 parish map of Pembrokeshire, and is a former marcher borough. George Owen of Henllys, in 1603, described it as one of five Pembrokeshire boroughs overseen by a portreeve. It retains some of the borough customs such as electing a mayor, who beats the bounds on horseback every August.

In the 1880s the castle was associated with John Brett, who rented it for his large family while he spent summers cruising the south and west coasts of Wales painting, sketching and photographing. He moored his 210-ton schooner, Viking (which had a crew of twelve) at Parrog. A lifeboat station (now a private residence) was operated from a beach known as The Cwm to the west of Parrog in the early 20th century.

== Governance ==
At the local level, the electorate of the community elects up to eleven town councillors to Newport Town Council, who meet monthly.

Newport is also an electoral ward to Pembrokeshire County Council, electing one county councillor. Like many wards in the county, Newport has been represented by Independent councillors with no party affiliation.

== Areas ==
=== Town ===
Newport town has a compact but varied shopping centre with most facilities including a post office, a wide range of retail premises and ancient buildings including the castle (not open to the public).

=== Parrog ===
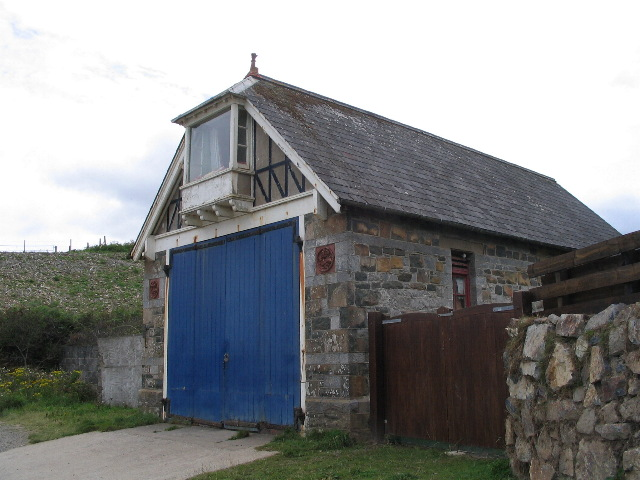
Old lifeboat station, The Cwm

The old port area contains much of historic interest, including some of the old quay walls and two former lime kilns. There are moorings for small craft and a number of holiday lets and eating places. It is possible, with caution, to cross the river on foot at low tide. Parrog has two beaches, a golf course, a windsurfing and dinghy sailing club, pubs, hotels and camping grounds.

== Listed buildings ==
In the community, there are more than 60 listed buildings.

== Amenities ==
=== Worship ===
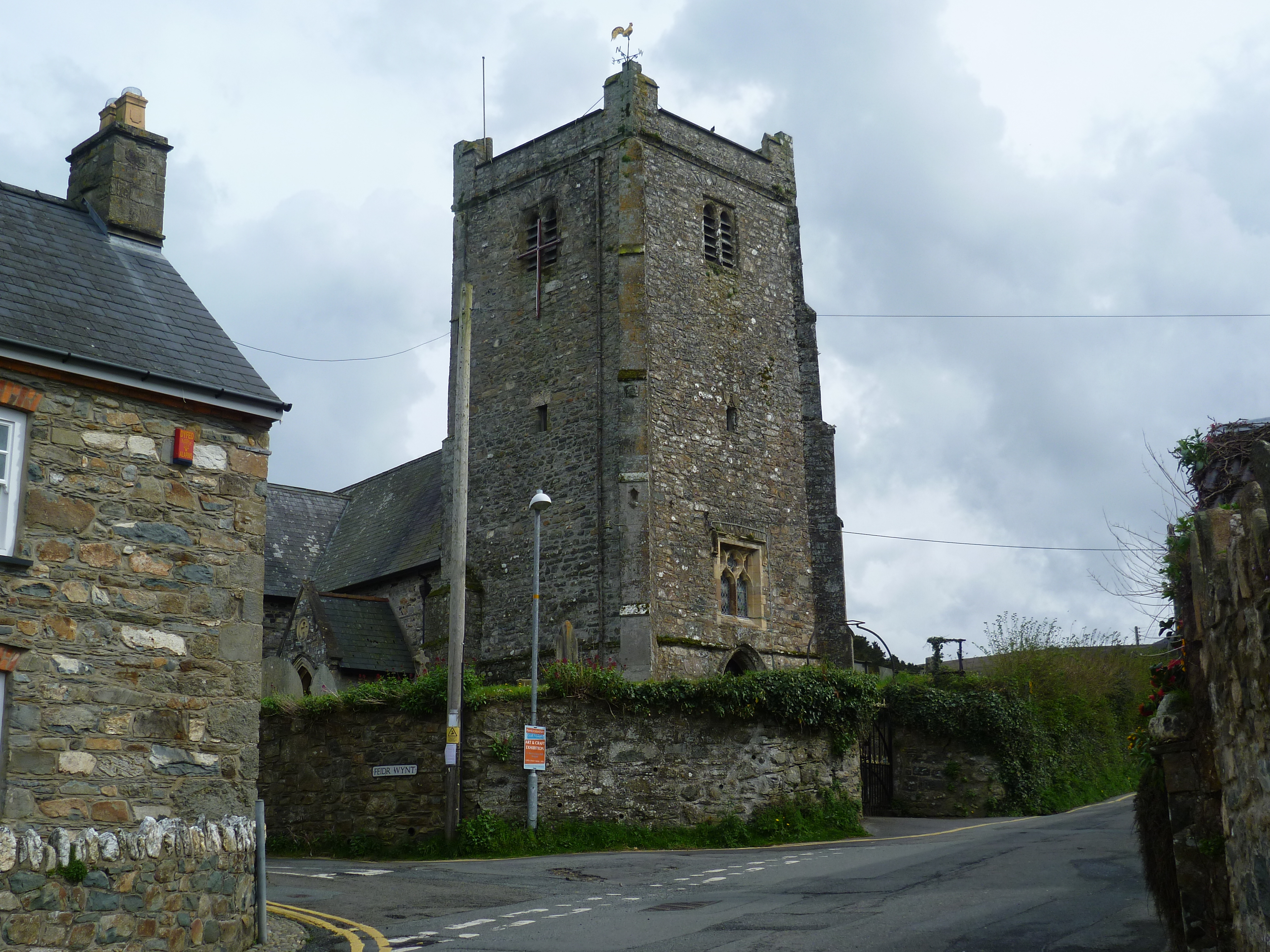
The tower of St Mary's Church

The church of St Mary's, situated below the castle though within the town, dates from the FitzMartin era, and the outside east apse bears their arms ("Argent, two bars gules"). It is a Grade II* listed building. The church was the subject of an 1860 photograph by notable early Welsh photographer John Thomas (1838–1905).

Other religious buildings include Bethlehem Chapel and the Tabernacle Chapel.

=== Hostelries ===
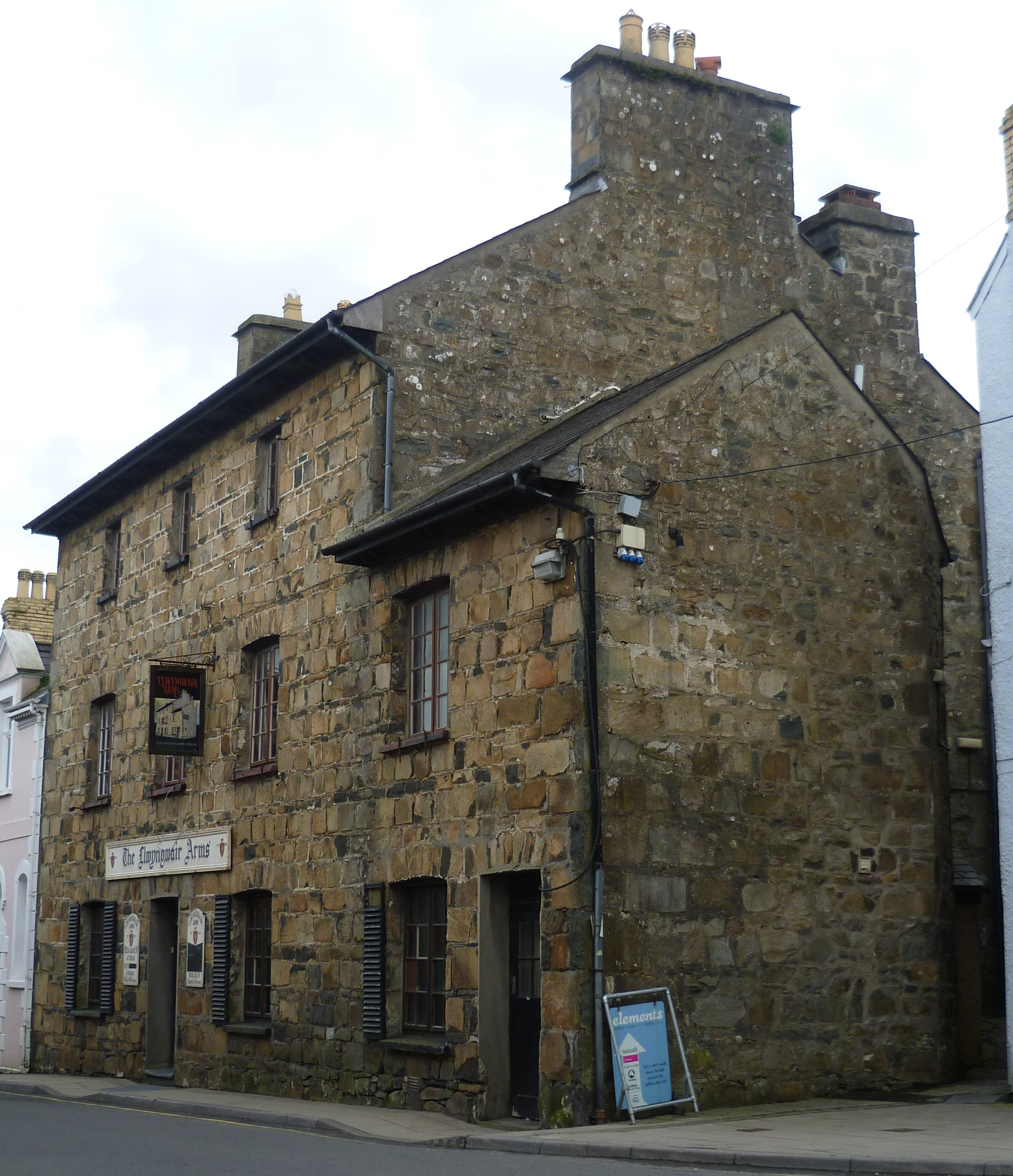
Llwyngwair Arms

The town's hostelries include Llwyngwair Arms, the Castle Inn, the Royal Oak, the Golden Lion and Cnapan Hotel, a Georgian hotel and restaurant. Tides restaurant, and the Canteen pizza restaurant are located on Market Street in the centre of town.

=== Sailing ===
Newport Sailing Club is housed in an old warehouse. As well as facilities for members, it has a non-members' bar.

=== Sports ===
Newport Pembs Tennis club formed by local residents in 1984 is located at the end of Long street, by the River Nevern estuary. Across the estuary to the North of the town is Newport Links Golf Club, formed in 1925.

=== Walking ===
Newport is on the Pembrokeshire Coast Path, part of the Wales Coast Path, and is popular for walks in the Preseli Hills. Carn Ingli hill, an Iron Age hillfort with Bronze Age hut circles, lies just outside the town. Nearby are the Carreg Coetan Arthur burial chamber and the West Wales Eco Centre.

A little to the north of Newport lie Newport Cliffs, a Site of Special Scientific Interest managed by Natural Resources Wales.

== Notable people ==
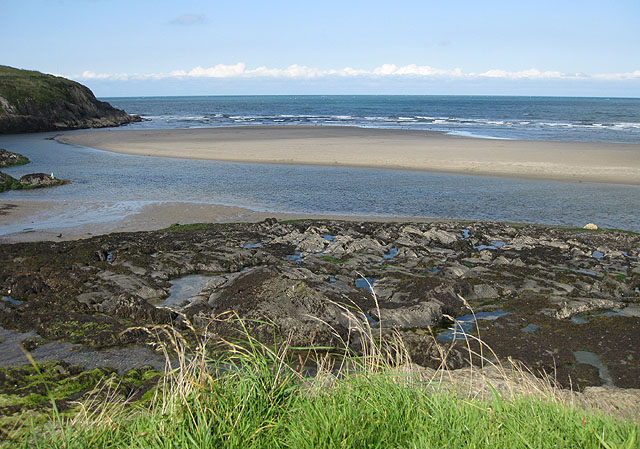
Newport Bay across Traeth y Bettws and Afon Nyfer - viewed from the Pembrokeshire Coast Path.

- Robert FitzMartin, (ca.10??–ca.1159), Norman knight and first Lord of Cemais, founded Newport Castle.
- John Grono, (ca.1767–1847), settler, sailor, ship builder, ship captain, sealer, whaler and farmer, born in Newport, died in Australia.
- James Bevan Bowen (MP) (1828–1905), of Llwyngwair, was High Sheriff of Pembrokeshire in 1862
- W.B. Gallie (1912-1998), the philosopher, retired from his post of Professor of Political Science at Peterhouse, Cambridge University and with his wife, the novelist Menna Gallie (1919-1990), settled in Newport.
- John Seymour, (1914–2004), author, lived at a farm near Newport between 1963 and 1980.
- Brigadier John Bellman MC (1920-1998), ADC to Queen Elizabeth II.
- Dillwyn Miles (1915–2007), writer and teacher, was born in Newport.

== See also ==
- Felin Llwyngwair

== Twinning ==
Newport is twinned with the village of Plouguin in Finistère, Brittany and Annapolis, Maryland, USA

== Other sources ==
- The Lords of Cemais, Dillwyn Miles, Haverfordwest, 1996.
- Cemais, Dillwyn Miles, Haverfordwest, 1998.
- Echoes and Shadows: tales and traditions of Newport and Nevern, Brian John, Newport, 2008.
- Carningli: land and people, Brian John, Newport, 2008.

Panoramic image from Carn Ingli with Newport bay in the far right distance
