= Temperley (surname) =

Temperley is a surname. Notable people with this surname include:

- Alan Temperley, British author
- Alice Temperley (born 1975), British fashion designer
- Edward Temperley Gourley (1826–1902), English coal fitter, shipowner and politician
- George Temperley (1823–1900), British-born Argentine landowner, founder of Temperley, Argentina
- Georgina Temperley (1880–1936), Australian recruiting officer in WWI
- Harold Temperley (1879–1939; Harold William Vazeille Temperley), British historian
- Harold Neville Vazeille Temperley (1915–2017; "Neville Temperley"), British applied mathematician and physicist, co-creator of the Temperley–Lieb algebra
- Iris Temperley (died 2010), Australian murder victim
- Joe Temperley (1929–2016), Scottish jazz saxophonist
- John Ridley Temperley (19th century), inventor of the Temperley transporter overhead crane
- Jorge Temperley (19th century), founder of Temperley, Argentina; see Buenos Aires Great Southern Railway#Temperley stationTemperley station
- Kavyen Temperley (born 1978, "Kav Temperley"), Australian musician
- Nicholas Temperley (1932–2020), American musicologist
- Rosemary Charlotte Holcroft (née Temperley) (1942–2000), South African illustrator
- Thomas Temperley (1845–1918) newspaperman in New South Wales, Australia

== Fictional characters ==
- Fictional characters that are members of the House of Temperley in the eponymous 1913 film, The House of Temperley, Lady Temperley, Charles Temperley, Jack Temperley
