= H. W. Timperley =

English historian and author

Harold William Timperley (1890–1964) was an English author of local history and topographical studies, the most notable of which was illustrated by L. S. Lowry. In later life he worked with his wife Edith Brill, who later published her own books on the Cotswolds.

== Early life ==
Harold was born at Madeley, Shropshire in 1890 to Samuel Timperley—a picture framer— and Sarah Chamberlain (née Ward). He was the second son, being just two years younger than his brother Horace, and older brother to Ernest born in 1892. The family moved to Chorlton, a southern suburb of Manchester, where his sister Violet was born when he was aged 13 so she played little part in his childhood.

== Work ==
Timperley's first book was a selection of natural history essays entitled English Scenes and Birds. It was published by Jonathan Cape in 1929.

Cape commissioned L.S. Lowry to make twelve pencil drawings to illustrate A Cotswold Book, which was published in 1931. On the basis of this Noel Carrington asked Timperley to provide an introduction to the collection of articles that he published in April 1933 to promote the Lygon Arms hotel in Broadway, Worcestershire. Timperley's 1947 Shropshire Hills describing his walks was illustrated by Albert T. Pile with thirty line Drawings and sixteen plates in line and wash. Vale of Pewsey was published in 1954 as part of Robert Hale's Regional Books series.

Timperley's work with his wife on the ancient trackways of Wessex made extensive use of earlier sources and proposed the existence of several previously unidentified routes. Some of these proposals, such as a North Hampshire Ridgeway, were not accepted by archaeologists because the routes were not associated with any ancient settlements and their theories are now discredited.

== Bibliography ==
- H.W. Timperley, English Scenes and Birds, (London: Jonathan Cape, 1929)
- H.W. Timperley, (ill. L.S. Lowry), A Cotswold Book, (London: Jonathan Cape, 1931)
- Noel Carrington (ed.), Broadway and the Cotswolds. With an introduction on the Cotswold scene by H. W. Timperley. (Printed & Published for the Lygon Arms Broadway, 1933)
- H.W. Timperley, Ridge Way Country, (London: JM Dent, 1935)
- H.W. Timperley, (ill. Albert T. Pile), Shropshire Hills, (London: JM Dent, 1947)
- H.W. Timperley, Vale of Pewsey, (London: Robert Hale, 1954)
- H.W. Timperley & Edith Brill, Ancient Trackways of Wessex, (London: Phoenix House, 1965)
