= Robert Hale (publishers) =

London book publishers

Robert Hale Limited
- Founded: 1936; 90 years ago
- Founder: Robert Hale
- Defunct: December 1, 2015; 10 years ago
- Successor: The Crowood Press
- Country of origin: United Kingdom
- Headquarters location: London

Robert Hale Limited was a London publisher of fiction and non-fiction books, founded in 1936, and also known as Robert Hale. It was based at Clerkenwell House, Clerkenwell Green. It ceased trading on 1 December 2015 and its imprints were sold to The Crowood Press.

== Robert Hale ==
Robert Hale was born in Norwich in 1887, the son of a pub landlord, and worked in publishing from leaving school. He was at John Long Ltd., a London firm taken over by Hutchinson & Co. in 1926, when he had become manager there. After the takeover he was managing director of the subsidiary. He moved to Jarrolds Publishing, working with the accountant S. Fowler Wright, another imprint of Hutchinson & Co. In the later 1920s he was a friend of Margery Allingham, a Jarrolds author, and her husband Philip Carter.

Hale left Hutchinson & Co. in 1935, founding a company of his own. It was noted for its prolific list, and tight management. His choice of telegraphic address, "Barabbas", reflected publishing industry cynicism. The partners stated in 1939 were: H. Robert Hale, James Eric Heriot, Theodore MacDonald, and Desmond I. Vesey. Robert Hale died on 20 August 1956, aged 68.

His son, John Hale, then took over the company and expanded the list, adding genres and acquiring imprints. John Hale closed the company in 2015 and transferred the list to The Crowood Press.

== Early books ==
Robert Hale and Company early published authors including Wyndham Lewis. The Vulgar Streak (1941) contained an explanation by Lewis of fascism, as he explained in a letter to Hale; it was a commission from 1937, working title Men at Bay. In the meantime The Mysterious Mr Bull (Robert Hale, 1938), a satire against the political left, had appeared.

Berthold Brecht's Threepenny Novel appeared in English translation (by Desmond Vesey) in 1937, published by Robert Hale as A Penny for the Poor. Vesey denied to Brecht, on behalf of the publisher, that its political content had been toned down. The Spanish Arena (1938) by William Foss and Cecil Gerahty had a preface by Jacobo Fitz-James Stuart, 17th Duke of Alba, then representative in London of Francisco Franco. Its claims of a "Jewish conspiracy" among journalists opposed to Franco led to legal action by Reuters. Hale withdrew the book, and an edited edition was published by the Right Book Club.

Farewell Leicester Square by Betty Miller was published in 1941. The company went on to publish her three final novels. The firm also published many of the later novels by Eunice Buckley (pseudonym of Rose Laure Allatini).

Robert Hale published in hardback in the UK the first four Harold Robbins titles, 79 Park Avenue, Never Love a Stranger, A Stone for Danny Fisher and Never Leave Me. In 1986 it published Robert Goddard's first novel, Past Caring. Other authors published in the UK include James Hadley Chase, John D. MacDonald and Edward Storey.

== Authors ==
Robert Hale and Company published all 90 of the novels of Jean Plaidy, the pseudonym of Eleanor Hibbert. The Tivington Nott, a semi-autobiographical novel by Alex Miller, was published by Robert Hale, after the appearance of its sequel Watching the Climbers on the Mountain. Robert Hale also published the first book by the social scientist Dr Leo Ruickbie in 2004, a non-fiction socio-historical work called Witchcraft Out of the Shadows.

The 1965 translation The White Rose of the 1929 German work by B. Traven was criticised.

== Topographical works ==
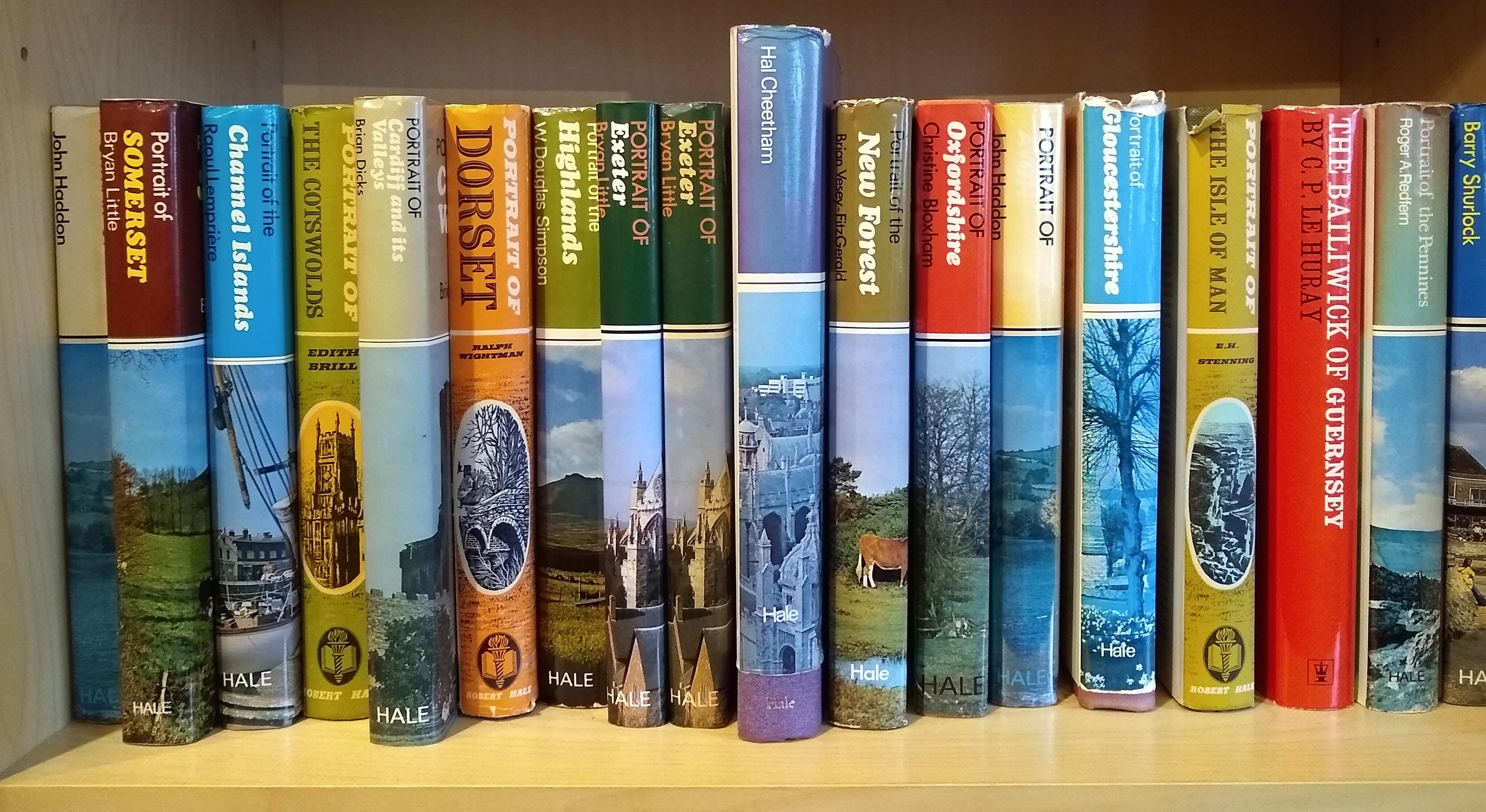
Volumes from Hale's "Portrait of" series

Hale were known for their series on British topography such as the County Books series, The Regions of Britain series, and the Portrait of series. They also published Cecil Keeling's Pictures of Persia, which contained memoirs from his wartime service there alongside 30 colour plates.

== Genre fiction ==
The company is now known in particular as a specialist genre fiction publisher. In the romance novel genre, many Robert Hale authors then moved on to Mills & Boon. Over the period 1968 to 1982, the company produced an extended series of hardback science fiction titles, for the public library market. Most of these works were published in the 1970s; they included editions of prominent American writers, some less-known authors, and a number of pseudonymous works. In the field of juvenile travel and adventure literature the company published the World Adventure Series (1958–59).

== Western stories ==
Robert Hale has published many western stories in the Black Horse Western series in hardback editions, sold mainly to libraries in the UK. Some of these later appeared in large print editions published by Linford in their Linford Western Library series. Lauran Paine has had some of his writings published by Robert Hale. The Crowood Press ceased publication of Black Horse Western books in November 2020 after experimenting with soft cover and ebook editions and determining the imprint was no longer viable.

== Premises ==
In the early days the company address was 102 Great Russell Street. It later moved to 63 Old Brompton Road. The company moved to 45–7 Clerkenwell Green in 1974–5.

== Imprints ==
JA Allen and NAG Press are its imprints. J.A. Allen, founded in 1926 and known for equestrian and hunting titles, was acquired by Hale in 1999. NAG Press (horological and gemmological titles) was acquired earlier.

Jill Norman brought her list to Robert Hale in the 1980s, including works by Elizabeth David; but was dismissed from the company in 1984 by John Hale, her name remaining as an imprint. Norman moved on to Dorling Kindersley.

== See also ==
- County Books series
- Portrait of series
- Regional Books series
- The Regions of Britain
