= Crichton Porteous =

Writer in the Peak District, England

Leslie Crichton Porteous (1901–1991) was a writer (writing under the name of Crichton Porteous) of fiction and non-fiction – books, articles and short stories – many of them about life in the Peak District of northern England, and often set in specific Peak locations (Toad Hole and Broken River, for example, are set in the Derwent Valley).

Born in Leeds, Porteous grew up near Manchester, but spent a lot of time in the Peak during holidays as a child, and later moved to live there, firstly to Combs, Derbyshire, near Chapel-en-le-Frith, and later to Darley Dale, near Matlock, where he lived until his death, aged 89.

As a boy, Crichton Porteous had a great interest in reading and writing, and from the age of fourteen he kept a daily journal; these journals later proved a useful reference for his work. After working on farms he moved into newspapers, working his way up to become assistant editor of the Northern Daily Mail. As a freelance writer, his first book, Farmer's Creed, was published in 1938. This book recounted his memoirs about his time as a farm worker on Werneth Low.

Today his work has been opened to a new audience through the show entitled In the Footsteps of Crichton Porteous, which toured widely in England, and particularly in the north-west. The show used his books to retrace some of the locations featured.

== List of published books ==
- Farmer's Creed (1938)
- Teamsman (1939)
- Land Truant (1940)
- The Cottage (1941)
- The Farm by the Lake (1942)
- The Snow (1944)
- The Earth Remains (1945)
- Sons of the Farm (1948)
- Pioneers of Fertility (1948)
- The Beauty and Mystery of Well Dressing (1949)
- Changing Valley (1950)
- Derbyshire (1950)
- Wild Acres (1951)
- Caves and Cavern (1951)
- Call of the Soil (1953)
- Chuckling Joe (1954)
- Peakland (1954)
- Man of the Moors (1954)
- Battle Mound (1955)
- Death in the Field (1956)
- Broken River (1956)
- Great Men of Derbyshire (1956)
- Lucky Columbel (1959)
- Toad Hole (1960)
- Pill Boxes and Bandages (1960)
- Plays: Batchelor Love and Dickies Scull (1960)
- Strike (1962)
- Portrait of Peakland (1963)
- Man of the Fields (with S. Looker) (1965)
- Pictorial Derbyshire (1970, 1977)
- Ancient Customs of Derbyshire (1960, 1985)
