= List of alumni of Girton College, Cambridge =

This is a list of alumni of Girton College, Cambridge.

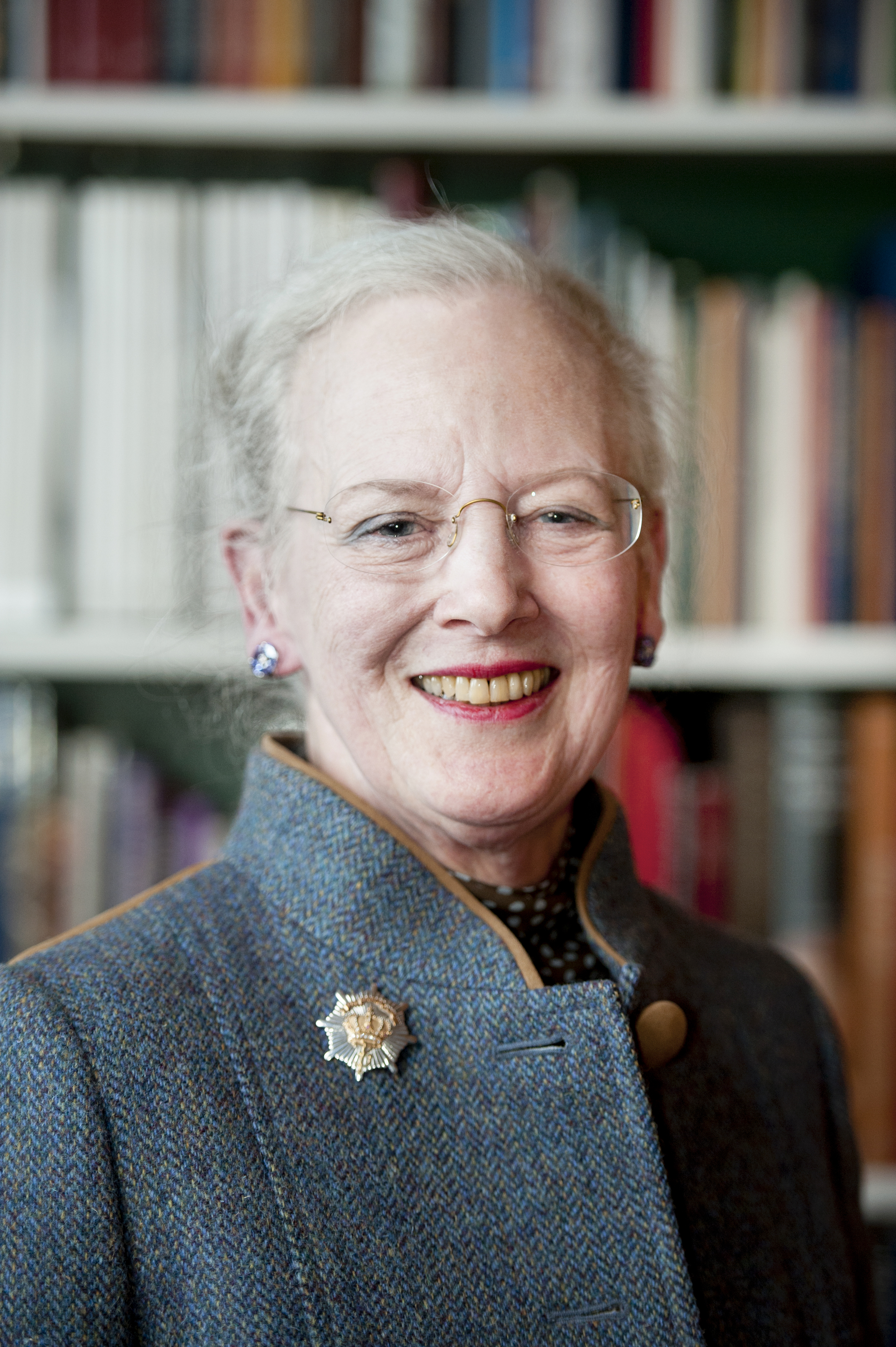
Margrethe II of Denmark

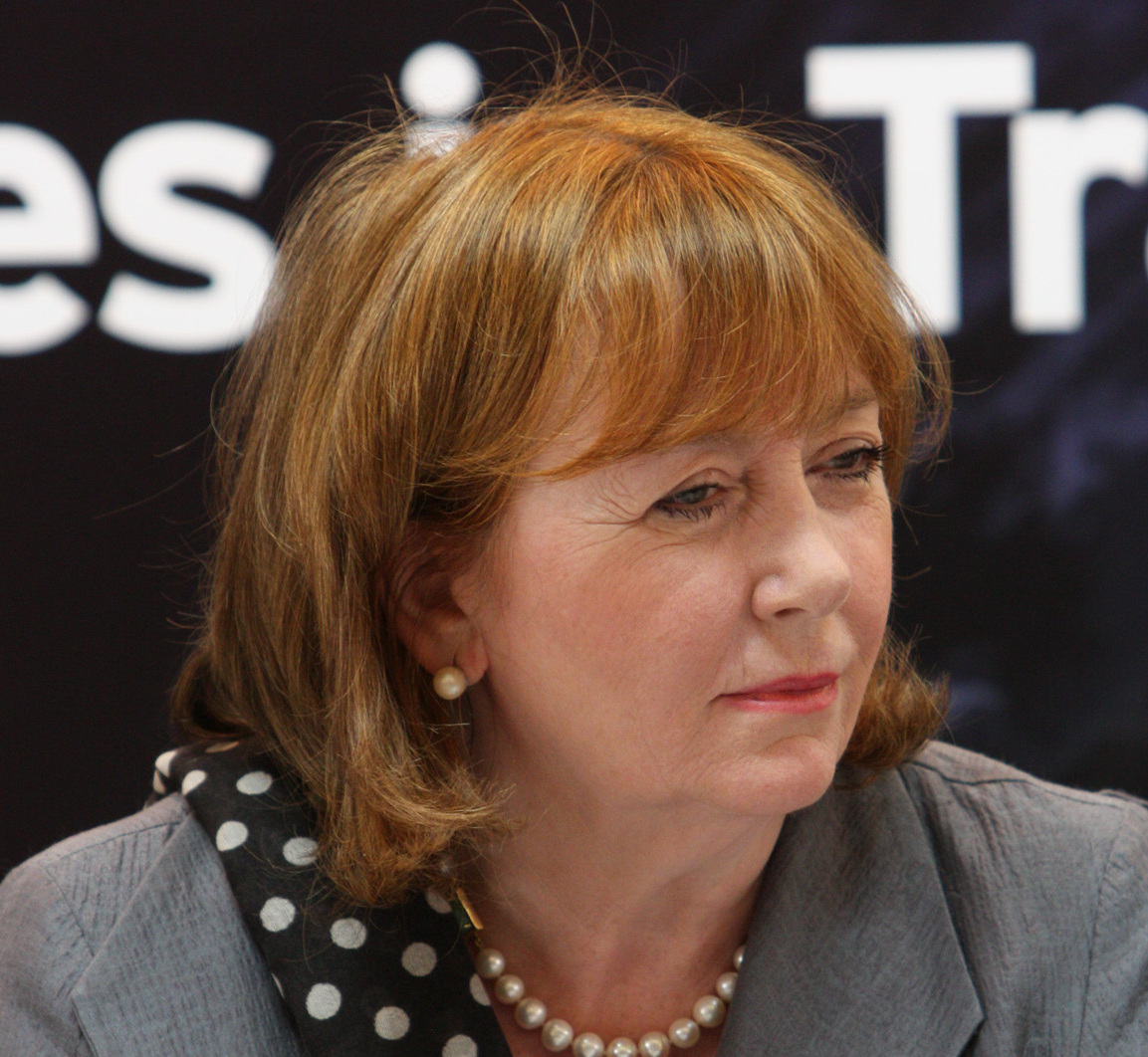
Elizabeth Symons, Baroness Symons of Vernham Dean, British peer

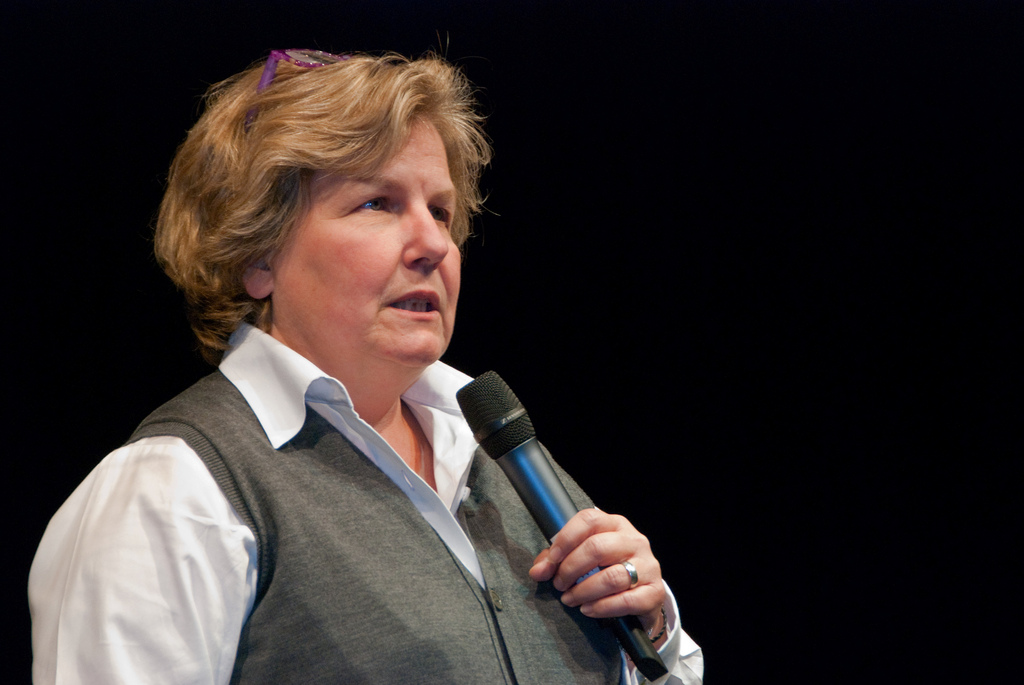
Sandi Toksvig, comedian and author

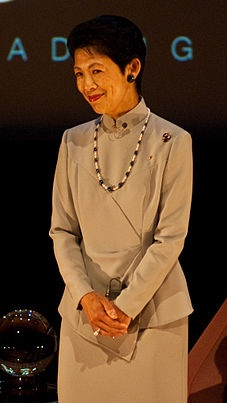
Hisako, Princess Takamado, member of the Japanese Imperial Family

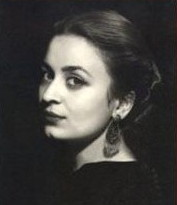
Dina bint 'Abdu'l-Hamid, Queen consort of Jordan

Name	Birth	Death	Career/Notable attainments
Margaret Alford	1868	1951	Classical scholar
Adelaide Anderson	1863	1936	Labour activist
Margaret Swainson Anderson	1902	1952	First woman academic appointed at Girton to teach geography
Mary Arden	1947		Lord Justice of Appeal
Hertha Marks Ayrton	1854	1923	Electrical engineer
Anne Bayley	1934	2024	Surgical oncologist in Zambia and HIV/AIDS researcher
Janet Ruth Bacon	1891	1965	Principal, Royal Holloway College, University of London 1935-44
Sally Beauman	1944	2016	Author
Florence Bell	1913	2000	Scientist, first X-ray diffraction photograph of DNA
Mary Berry	1917	2008	Conductor
Dina bint 'Abdu'l-Hamid	1929	2019	Queen consort of Jordan
Ann Bishop	1899	1990	Protozoologist
Alistair Brownlee	1988		Triathlete (left to study at University of Leeds)
Agnata Frances Butler née Ramsey	1867	1931	Only first in 1887 Classics Tripos, honoured in Punch (magazine) cartoon 'Ladies Only'
Margaret Canovan	1939		Professor of political theory
Anthony Carrigan	1980	2016	Scholar in postcolonial literature and cultures
Janet Elizabeth Case	1863	1937	British classics teacher and journalist
Wendy R. Childs	1943		Professor of Later Medieval History at the University of Leeds
Patricia Clarke	1919	2010	Professor of microbial biochemistry
Sarah Clarke	1965		Former president of the Royal College of Physicians of London and cardiologist
Vicky Clement-Jones	1948	1987	Physician
Tina Cooper	1918	1986	Paediatrician
Isabel Cooper-Oakley	1854	1914	Theosophical writer
Gwendolen Crewdson	1872	1913	Egyptologist
Elizabeth Dawes	1865	1954	Classical scholar, educational reformer, first woman to receive a DLitt degree from the University of London
Mary Clara Dawes	1862	?	Classical scholar, first woman to receive an MA degree from the University of London (in 1884)
Delia Derbyshire	1937	2001	Musician, composer
Athene Donald	1953		Physicist
Tom Fordyce			BBC Sports journalist
Veronica Forrest-Thomson	1947	1975	Poet
Jane Fraser	1967		President of Citigroup
Olive Fraser	1909	1977	Poet and novelist
George Freeman MP	1967		British politician
Zahra Freeth	1925	2015	Author on Middle Eastern topics
Jane Grenville	1958		British archaeologist and academic
Brenda Hale, Baroness Hale of Richmond	1945		Justice of the Supreme Court of the United Kingdom
Phil Hammond	1962		Comedian and Doctor
Rosalyn Higgins	1937		President of the International Court of Justice
Gertrude Himmelfarb	1922	2019	American cultural historian
Judith A. Hill	1959		Historian
Arianna Huffington	1950		Political author and activist, founder of The Huffington Post
Wendy Holden	1965		Novelist
Patricia Hollis, Baroness Hollis of Heigham	1941		Peer and historian
Dorothy Jewson	1884	1964	British politician
Denise Kingsmill, Baroness Kingsmill			Labour Peer
Julie Kirkbride	1960		Former MP
Gabrielle Lambrick	1913	1968	Civil servant, historian, teacher
Beatrice Lindsay	1858	1917	Zoologist
Jean Lindsay	1910	1996	Historian, Teacher
Rosamond Lehmann	1901	1990	Novelist
Lorna Lloyd	1914	1942	Second World War diarist
Rachel Lomax	1945		Former Deputy Governor of the Bank of England
Sheila Scott Macintyre	1910	1960	Mathematician
Ada Isabel Maddison	1869	1950	Mathematician
Margrethe II of Denmark	1940		Queen regnant of Denmark
Annie Scott Dill Maunder	1868	1947	Astronomer
Anna Maxted	1969		Novelist
Constance Maynard	1849	1935	British feminist, educator
Rod McAllister	1961		Architect
Marion McQuillan	1921	1998	Metallurgist
Margaret Mountford	1951		Former Herbert Smith partner, now star of BBC's The Apprentice
Jennifer Moyle	1921	2016	Biochemist
Sarojini Naidu	1879	1949	Poet, politician
Joseph O'Neill	1964		Novelist, non-fiction writer
Philippa Pearce	1920	2006	OBE FRSL, author of children's books best known for Tom's Midnight Garden
Karen Pierce	1959		Permanent UK representative to the UN
Sheila Pim	1909	1995	Novelist and biographer
Eileen Power	1889	1940	British economic historian and medievalist
Emily James Smith Putnam	1865	1944	Educator, historian
Kathleen Raine	1908	2003	Poet
Helene Reynard	1875	1947	Economist and college administrator
Nancie Clifton Reynolds	1903	1931	Domestic advice writer, lecturer, BBC broadcaster
Gisela Richter	1882	1972	Classical archaeologist, art historian
Eirlys Roberts	1911	2008	Classical scholar; consumer campaigner; editor of Which?
Joan Robinson	1903	1983	Economist
Diana Ross	1910	2000	Author
Sao Sanda	1928		Shan royalty and the last princess of Yawnghwe
Ethel Sargant	1863	1918	Botanist
Wendy Savage	1935		Gynaecologist
Charlotte Angas Scott	1858	1931	Mathematician
Matthew Schellhorn	1977		Concert pianist
Rosamund Flora Shove	1878	1954	Botanist
Gavin Shuker MP	1981		British politician
Sasha Siem	1984		Singer-Songwriter and Composer
Charlie Siem	1986		Violinist
Caroline Skeel	1872	1951	Educator
Salma Sobhan	1937	2003	Barrister
E. Millicent Sowerby	1883	1977	Bibliographer
Irene Spry	1907	1998	Economic historian
Christopher Steele	1964		Spy
Alice Stewart	1906	2002	Epidemiologist
Marilyn Strathern	1941		Social Anthropologist
Steph Swainston	1974		Writer
Bertha Swirles	1903	1999	Physicist
Elizabeth Symons, Baroness Symons of Vernham Dean	1951		Peer, former General Secretary of the FDA trade union
Princess Takamado	1953		Princess of Japan
Mary Taylor Slow	1898	1984	Physicist
Sandi Toksvig	1958		Author and broadcaster
Dorothy Wedderburn	1925	2012	Principal, Royal Holloway and Bedford New College, University of London
Sarah Woodhead	1851	1912	First woman to take, and to pass, the Mathematical Tripos exam, which she did in 1873; headmistress of Bolton High School for Girls
Barbara Adam Wootton	1897	1988	Social scientist, economist
Wilmer Cave Wright	1868	1951	Classical philologist
Dorothy Wrinch	1894	1976	Mathematical biologist
Grace Chisholm Young	1868	1944	Mathematician
