= Gladys Colton =

Gladys Madge Colton FRSA (1909 – 24 April 1986), was an English schoolmistress and educationist. She was head mistress of the City of London School for Girls from 1949 to 1972 and a Fellow of the Royal Society of Arts.

== Life ==
The elder daughter of William Henry Colton, Gladys Colton was educated at Wycombe High School and University College London, where she graduated BA in History, then took a postgraduate Diploma in Education.

Colton was a schoolmistress at Slepe Hall, St Ives, from 1932 to 1937, then taught at Beaminster Grammar School in Dorset from 1937 to 1941, when she was appointed as senior history mistress at Ealing Grammar School for Girls. She was deputy second mistress there when in 1949 she was chosen as head of the City of London School for Girls. One of her students later described her as "a tall, elegant lady; the epitome of dignity". She retired in 1972 and is remembered at the school as an outstanding administrator.

Colton was elected a Fellow of the Royal Society of Arts and between 1969 and 1973 was a member of its Council. She was also a member of the Governing Body of the City of London College from 1957 to 1962 and of the St Bartholomew's Hospital Nurse Education Committee from 1962 to 1972.
