= Beaminster Grammar School =

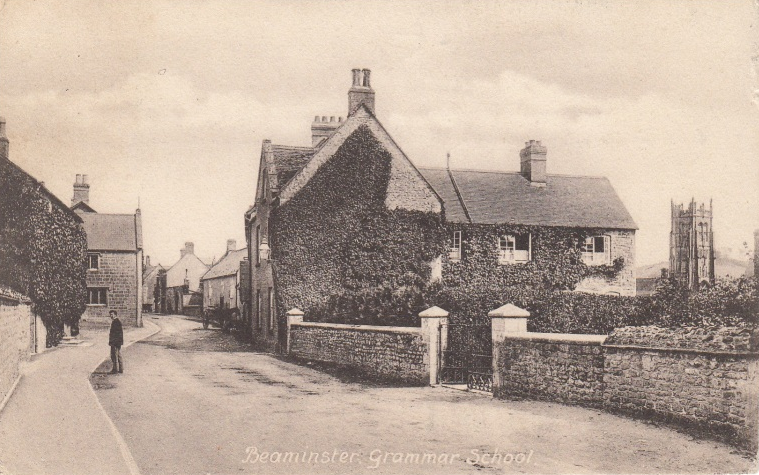
- School House, late 19th century

Location
- Beaminster, Dorset; England
- 50°49′N 2°44′W

Information
- Type: grammar school
- Established: c. 1868
- Closed: 1962
- Age: 11 to 18

Beaminster Grammar School, known in its final years as Beaminster and Netherbury Grammar School, was a small grammar school in the town of Beaminster, in Dorset, England, founded about 1868 and closed in 1962.

== History ==
An earlier Beaminster Grammar School existed in the town in the 18th century, and one of its Masters, the Rev. Samuel Hood, was the father of two admirals, Samuel Hood, 1st Viscount Hood (1724–1816) and Alexander Hood, 1st Viscount Bridport (1726–1814). This school had closed by 1820.

The later grammar school was founded after the closure of a school called the Beaminster Classical and Commercial School, which came to an end in 1868. Originally for boys only, the new school took boarders as well as day boys.

In 1904, Dorset County Council made the school a specialist centre for agriculture. A fund was opened to provide more accommodation, and the local member of parliament, Colonel Robert Williams, donated £300. Writing about the 1910s fifty years later, old boy Ralph Wightman recalled that "The masters were kindly, and corporal punishment was almost unknown. I was at Beaminster under two Headmasters, and the second, Mr L. Skyrm, did not cane anyone..." He remembered that in those days most children had gone to school by bicycle, but about eight had ridden in on horses, “…and the way home usually started with a race.” This continued into the 1920s.

After the First World War, the school merged with a similar establishment in neighbouring Netherbury and was renamed the Beaminster and Netherbury Grammar School. It was by then co-educational, which was unusual for a secondary school in the first half of the 20th century. In 1923, an Old Boys' and Old Girls' Association (OBOGA) was founded. In the 1930s, the number of pupils was about 130.

In the 1950s there were both weekly and termly boarders, the boys sleeping at School House in Hogshill Street, the girls at Tucker House on the other side of the road, until later the girls were transferred to a house called Woodlands on the Bridport Road and Tucker House became a second boys' house. There was a flourishing Combined Cadet Force. The school was successful at cricket, and day children had their school lunches at a nearby inn, the Red Lion. However, in December 1962 the school was closed, largely because its small size of about 150 pupils made it relatively expensive to operate. A new comprehensive school replaced it.

The old school association, OBOGA, was still going strong in 2013, when it celebrated its 90th annual reunion. Since the 1960s School House has been subdivided into 49A and 49B Hogshill Street, with a new development at one side called School House Close.

== Headmasters ==
- 1868: Rev. Thomas Neave
- 1916–1933: Llewellyn Skyrm (died 1965)
- 1933–December 1935: I. M. B. Stuart, formerly a master at St Paul's and Harrow, and an international rugby footballer for Ireland, later head of Portora Royal School.
- January 1936 – 1938: H. H. Abbott, previously second master of Hymers College.
- 1938–1940: Francis Morier Porter (born 1900)
- 1943–1962: Francis Morier Porter, reappointed after Territorial Army war service (died 1983)

Other staff

- Gladys Colton (1909–1986), schoolmistress at Beaminster 1937 to 1941, later head at the City of London School for Girls
- Margaret Barnes (1920–1987), history mistress, previously at Yeovil High School

== Notable former pupils ==
- Ralph Wightman (1901–1971), journalist, author, and regular guest on Any Questions?
- Sir John Toothill (1908–1986), general manager of Ferranti electronics
- Sir John Saint (1898–1987), agricultural chemist, chairman of the Barbados Public Service Commission

== See also ==
- List of English and Welsh endowed schools (19th century)
