= John Toothill (industrialist) =

Sir John Norman Toothill CBE (11 November 1908 – 5 July 1986) was an English electrical engineer who rose to be Managing Director of Ferranti.

He was the author of the ground-breaking Toothill Report of 1961 and was one of the creators of the modern Scottish electronics industry.

== Life ==
He was born on 11 November 1908 at 13 Trafford Road in Leicester, the only son of John Harold Toothill, an engineer's fitter, and his wife, Helena Gibbins.

Educated at Beaminster Grammar School in Dorset, Toothill left school at the age of seventeen to be apprenticed to Tilling Stevens Ltd, a company in Maidstone which made buses. From there he moved on to Hoffman Manufacturing and then to Harris Lebus, a furniture manufacturer. In 1935 he was appointed as chief cost accountant to Ferranti, which was then a company making electrical instruments, and in 1942 became manager of its new works in Edinburgh. He remained as general manager of Ferranti Scotland until 1968, promoting the company's development into precision engineering and playing a large part in the creation of a Scottish electronics industry. He remained a director of Ferranti until 1975 and in the 1970s and 1980s was also a director of R. W. Toothill Limited, W. A. Baxter & Sons Limited, Fochabers, Moray. He was chairman of AI Welders of Inverness and of Highland Hydrocarbons from 1979 until his death.

In 1947 Toothill was chosen as chairman of the Research Committee of the Scottish Council for Development and Industry, and later chaired its Finance Committee. In 1956 he became a director of Ferranti. He was appointed to an Inquiry into the Scottish Economy, and in 1961 his Toothill Report on the Scottish Economy was published, recommending new investment in the country's less prosperous areas. In the 1964 New Year Honours he was knighted.

== Honours ==
- Commander of the Order of the British Empire, 1955
- Companion, Institution of Electrical Engineers
- Honorary Companion, Royal Aeronautical Society
- Knighthood, 1964
- Honorary LLD, University of Aberdeen, 1966
- Honorary DSc, Heriot-Watt University, 1968
- Honorary DSc, Cranfield Institute of Technology, 1970
