= Wycombe High School =

Location
- Marlow Road; High Wycombe, Buckinghamshire, HP11 1TB; England; 51.6196°N 0.7626°W

Information
- Type: Academy Grammar school
- Motto: Fortiter, Fideliter, Feliciter (Courageously, Faithfully, Joyfully)
- Established: 1901
- Specialist: Mathematics and Computing College
- Department for Education URN: 136723 Tables
- Ofsted: Reports
- Headteacher: Nicola Renyard
- Gender: Girls
- Age: 11 to 18
- Enrolment: 1348
- Houses: Austen; Brontë; Curie; Parks; Pankhurst; Nightingale
- Colours: Blue and Burgundy
- Website: Official website

Wycombe High School is a girls' grammar school in High Wycombe, Buckinghamshire taking girls from the age of 11 to 18. The school became an academy in 2011, and in 2020 had 1,308 pupils.

== History ==
=== Formation ===
The school was the first state grammar school for girls in Buckinghamshire when it opened in 1901 with eighteen pupils.

In 1901, the school was housed in the Clock House in Frogmoor, High Wycombe. At that time, enrolment was 18 fee-paying pupils and three staff. Miss Mary Christie M.A. was the first headmistress.

The school moved to Benjamin Road in 1906 where it remained for 50 years, except for a time during the First World War when it was evacuated to the old grammar school so that the Benjamin Road buildings could be used as a military hospital. By 1922 the school had 300 pupils and was rapidly expanding.

=== Second World War ===
Ealing County Girls' School (now The Ellen Wilkinson School for Girls) was evacuated to Buckinghamshire until July 1942.

The Ealing County Boys' School was evacuated to Aylesbury Grammar School.

=== Expansion after the war ===
The school acquired its status as a Voluntary Controlled girl's grammar school in 1944. By 1956 the number of girls wishing to attend the school was so great that the school moved again to new premises that were built at the present site on Marlow Hill.

It won the BBC Radio quiz show Top of the Form in 1958 and 1980.

In September 2005, the Department for Education and Skills (DfES) awarded the school specialist school status in Mathematics & Computing.

=== Buildings ===
Over the years, buildings have been added to the school, such as Technology, Sport and Drama blocks. These were built to allow for the extra 300 pupils and staff that arrived when Lady Verney High School joined with Wycombe High in 1993. The most recent addition is a new music centre which opened in the summer term in 2015.

The school houses a well-resourced library, conference facilities, and the school archive.

== Curriculum ==
Subjects taught at Wycombe High School from Year 7 are: English, Maths, Science, Art, Spanish, History, Geography, French, Computing, Latin, Religious Studies, Physical Education, Drama and Technology (alternating between Graphics, Textiles and Food throughout the year).

== Headteachers ==
- 1945 Anne Burrans, née Downs, she died on August 14 1992, aged 91
- September 1961 Beryl Muriel Miller, history teacher, she died on November 10 2012
- 1977 R. Ann Baylis
- 1985 Muriel N Pilkington
- 1998 Elizabeth Duffy
- 2008 Sharon Cromie
- 2022 Nicola Renyard

== Notable former pupils ==
- Julia Bone, tennis player
- Rachel Burden, journalist and radio / TV presenter
- Rita Clifton CBE, advertising executive
- Gladys Colton, headmistress of City of London School for Girls, 1949 to 1972
- Monica Felton, writer, town planner, feminist and social activist
- Isa Guha, England cricketer
- E. L. James, author of Fifty Shades of Grey; she joined the sixth form, with a few others on a scholarship in 1979
- Penny Jamieson, Bishop of Dunedin, New Zealand
- Shan Morgan CMG, British diplomat
- Marion McQuillan (1921 – 1998), British metallurgist who specialised in the engineering uses for titanium and its alloys
- Lady ('Molly') Mary Frances Wallis, née Bloxam, (September 12 1904 - January 1 1986), the wife of Sir Barnes Wallis for 54 years; her daughter Elizabeth (born 1933) is still alive; her son Christopher London Wallis married a former WHS girl in June 1963 in High Wycombe; Molly is featured in The Dam Busters 1955 film; Molly adopted her eldest sister Barbara's two sons, John (aged 10) and Robert McCormick (aged 8), in 1940 when Barbara (who also attended WHS) was killed, aged 37, with her dental surgeon husband Hurley McCormick, aged 39, and Molly's father Arthur Bloxam, aged 74, in a German air raid at 19 Links Road in Epsom, on November 7 1940
