= Grace Golden =

English illustrator and historian

- Born: 2 April 1904; London, England
- Died: 3 June 1993 (aged 89); London, England
- Education: Chelsea College of Art; Royal College of Art; Regent Street Polytechnic
- Known for: Painting, illustration

Grace Lydia Golden (2 April 1904 – 3 June 1993) was an English illustrator and historian. Raised in London, she began illustrating books in the early 1930s and began painting exhibition pieces after becoming the recipient of a small legacy in 1934, working in watercolours and oil paint.

== Early life ==
Grace Golden was born to a working-class family in east London. After her education at the City of London School for Girls, she won a scholarship to the Chelsea College of Art, where she studied from 1920 to 1923. She progressed from there to the Royal College of Art, where she first studied and later taught from 1926 to 1927. She also studied at the Regent Street Polytechnic for a time.

== Career ==
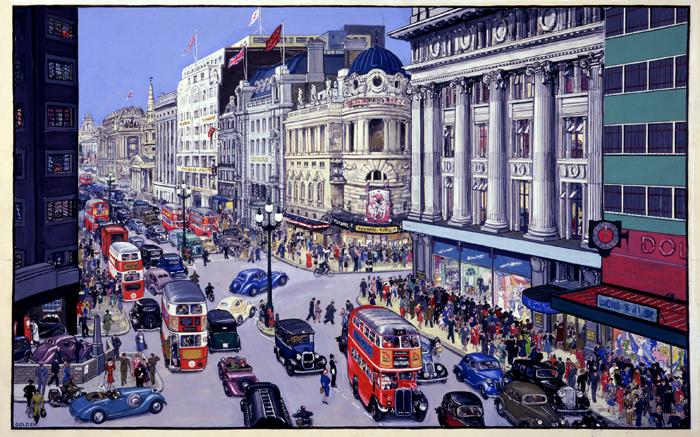
"A West-End London Street Scene" (ca 1945); clearly depicting Regent Street, Golden imagines future post-war prosperity

Golden's career in book illustration began in the early 1930s. She received a small legacy in 1934 which enabled her to work on exhibition pieces. Working in both watercolours and oil paint, she exhibited at the Royal Academy, as well as the Fine Art Society and Leicester Galleries.

Golden received a commission from The Pilgrim Trust to make illustrations of historic buildings and landmarks during World War II, as well as her work appearing in touring exhibitions. Golden received a sketching permit from the War Artists' Advisory Committee, WAAC, which allowed her to draw and paint in public during the war. WAAC also purchased her painting An Emergency Food Office which showed people queuing for ration books. Later, she worked for the Ministry of Information – painstakingly producing illustrations which were used to aid the reading of educational books. Posters promoting safe working practice were produced from her illustrations, many of which were used to stress the hazards of a mixed-sex workforce within wartime manufacturing environments, with slogans such as "Keep your mind on the job – and save your knuckles".

Golden had always been interested in the working life of the Thames. She had witnessed the lives of the industrious people who were employed near and on the river from the age of five, when her parents had moved to a five-storey house at the City End of Southwark Bridge. This fascination led to her producing her book Old Bankside which contained some fifty-one illustrations of the wharfs and alleys alongside the Thames between Blackfriars Bridge and London Bridge. Years later, Sam Wanamaker invited Golden to become the honorary archivist to his Globe Theatre project, which was based in the same part of London. Her work also frequently appeared in the Swift annual (1957–1961).

== Final years ==
Golden died on 3 June 1993, aged 89 at the Royal Free Hospital in north London. She had, during her last years, become something of a recluse, having closed herself off from the world around her and living a life of frugality and simplicity. Her work, which was popular with many writers, including Enid Blyton, will be remembered for its attention to detail, which now makes her work of distinctive historical value.

Some of her work is exhibited at the Tate Gallery and The National Archives. At Golders Green Crematorium, London, there is a commemorative plaque to her.

== Selected books illustrated by Golden ==
- The Voyage of the Landship (1947)
- Towpath Pad (1951)
- Wings over Dulcia (1954)
- The Wonderful Winter (1956)
