= John Saint (agricultural chemist) =

English agricultural chemist

Sir Sidney John Saint
- Born: 16 September 1897; Weymouth, Dorset, England
- Died: 15 June 1987 (aged 89); England
- Occupation: Agricultural chemist
- Parent(s): Charles Saint; Fanny Grist

Sir Sidney John Saint CMG OBE FRSC (16 September 1897 – 15 June 1987) was an English agricultural chemist who spent most of his working life in Barbados, where he was Director of Agriculture, Controller of Supplies, a member of the island's Executive Council, and a Privy Counsellor.

After retiring in 1963, he returned to England and lived in Sussex.

== Life ==
Saint was educated at Beaminster Grammar School in Dorset and the University of Reading, where he graduated MSc. He also gained the London degrees of BSc and PhD.

In 1916, during the First World War, Saint joined the Royal Flying Corps, and he remained in the new Royal Air Force until 1919. He held a Salter research fellowship for two years from 1920, then was a lecturer in Agricultural Chemistry at the University of Leeds from 1922 to 1927. That year, he went out to Barbados as a Chemist in the Department of Agriculture, and in 1937 was appointed as the colony's Director of Agriculture, a post he held until 1949. While Director, he was also chairman of the British West Indies Sugar Cane Breeding Station. During the Second World War he was Controller of Supplies in Barbados. In 1947 he was appointed as a member of the Executive Council of Barbados, in which he remained until 1961, when he became a Privy Counsellor for Barbados. In 1963 he retired to England, settling at Hurstpierpoint, Sussex.

Saint's other appointments included serving as President of the Barbados Technologists Association from 1939 to 1942, and again from 1950 to 1963, as General Chairman of the International Society of Sugar Cane Technologists from 1950 to 1953, as Chairman of the Barbados Public Service Commission, 1952 to 1957 and of the Barbados Development Board and the Interim Federal Public Service Commission, 1956 to 1959. He was President of the Barbados Museum and Historical Society, 1946 to 1959 and one of it Journal's (JBMHS) earliest editors.

In 1923, he married Constance Elizabeth Hole, and they had two sons and one daughter. He died on 15 June 1987, aged 88.

== Honours ==
- Officer of the Order of the British Empire, 1942
- Companion of the Order of St Michael and St George, 1946
- Knighthood, New Year Honours List, 1950
- Honorary Freeman of the City of Bridgetown, Barbados, 1963
- Fellow of the Royal Society of Chemistry

== Publications ==
- Composition of Feeding Stuffs (University College, Reading, Faculty of Agriculture and Horticulture Bulletin 31, 1921)
