= James Francis Tait =

English physicist and endocrinologist (1925–2014)

James Francis Tait (1926 – 2014) was an English physicist and endocrinologist. He worked with his wife, Sylvia Agnes Sophia Tait from 1948 until her death in 2003, a partnership described by the Oxford Dictionary of National Biography as "one of the most successful examples of husband-wife collaboration." Together, they discovered and identified the hormone aldosterone.

== Early life ==
Tait was born in Stockton on Tees in 1925, the son of Herbert and Constance Tait. His parents ran a small bakery, but his father died when he was 10. Tait attended Darlington Queen Elizabeth 1 Grammar School, where he took physics, chemistry, maths and English literature for the Higher School Certificate. He went to Leeds University to read physics, graduating in 1945. He joined Whiddington's research group at Leeds. completing his PhD thesis entitled The energy distribution of electrons in discharge tubes in 1947.

== Career ==
Tait joined the department of medical physics at Middlesex Hospital Medical School, London, as a lecturer, where he started to work on adrenal steroids, building on work by Ralph Dorfman. They discovered a biologically active compound that they called electrocortin (later renamed aldosterone), in collaboration with Swiss chemist Tadeus Reichstein who had received the Nobel Prize for similar work on cortisol. The discovery was published in 1952.

In 1958, the Taits moved to the Worcester Foundation for Experimental Biology in Shrewsbury, Massachusetts, where they worked with Gregory Pincus. Tait developed mathematical methods to calculate hormone secretion rates from changes in the ratio of radioactively labelled to unlabelled hormone in urine. This developed into a new field of study – hormone dynamics.

Tait undertook periods of leave at the Physiology Department at the University of Melbourne in Australia and at the Florey Institute of Neuroscience and Mental Health at UM. Following Pincus' death, Tait became joint chairman of the scientific council of the Worcester Foundation. In 1970, the Taits returned to the Middlesex Hospital as joint heads of the Biophysical Endocrinology Unit. Tait was also Joel Professor of Physics as Applied to Medicine. They worked on adrenal zona glomerulosa cells.

The Taits retired in 1982 and moved to East Boldre where they continued their scientific research using two Apple IIe computers running in parallel. In 2003, a scientific meeting was organised in London to celebrate the 50th anniversary of the discovery of Aldosterone, but Sylvia died shortly beforehand and Tait was undergoing diabetes treatment in the Royal Bournemouth Hospital. Tait subsequently moved to Harrogate and continued his scientific interests and writing. He authored or co-authored over 150 scientific papers during his career.

Tait died in Harrogate hospital on 2 February 2014.

== Awards and honours ==
- Tait and his wife were both elected Fellows of The Royal Society in 1959. They were only the second married couple to become FRSs (after Queen Victoria and Prince Albert) and the first married couple to be elected on the same day for their joint scientific achievements.
- Society for Endocrinology Medal 1969
- Tadeus Reichstein Award of the International Endocrine Society 1976
- Gregory Pincus Memorial Medal 1977
- Ciba Ward, Council for High Blood Pressure 1977
- Dale Medal, Society for Endocrinology 1979
- Honorary D.Sc. University of Hull 1979
- The R Douglas Wright Lecture and Medallion 1989

== Sources ==
- A quarter of Unlikely Discoveries Sylvia As Tait and Tames F Tait 2004 Athena Press. ISBN 1 84401 343X
- Brain drain couple to return The Times, London, 2 June 1970,
- Husband and wife amongst top medical scientists in country Lymington Times 15 March 2003
- Molecular and Cellular Endocrinology Vol 217, Nos 1–2, pp 1–270 March 31, 2004. Special Issue Proceedings of the 2003 International Symposium on Aldosterone.
- The Independent newspaper Obituary 22 February 2014 John P Coghlan and Gavin Vinson
- Royal Society honour husband and wife The Times, London 20 March 1959
