= Ralph Wightman =

English lecturer, author, and broadcaster (1901–1971)

Ralph Wightman (26 July 1901 – 28 May 1971) was an English lecturer, journalist, author, and radio and television broadcaster.

He wrote many books on farming and the countryside and in the 1950s and 1960s became a well-known national figure, especially as a regular guest on the BBC radio programme Any Questions?

== Life ==
A younger son of Tom Wightman, a farmer, and butcher of Piddletrenthide in Dorset, Wightman was educated at Beaminster Grammar School and Armstrong College, Newcastle, part of the University of Durham, where he graduated BSc in agricultural chemistry.

From 1923 to 1927, he was a lecturer on agriculture for Devon County Council, then from 1927 to 1930 for Wiltshire County Council, before, in 1930, he returned home as Senior Agricultural Adviser to Dorset County Council. He gave up that work in 1948 to become a freelance writer and broadcaster, having begun to give talks on radio in the 1930s.

During the Second World War, Wightman began to broadcast once a week to the United States on English country life, and he gave 290 such "Trans-Atlantic talks". His radio work nearer home included a feature on the BBC Home Service programme Country Magazine, which focuses on country life in a different place around England every week. As a broadcaster specializing in farming and the countryside, Wightman was soon seen as the natural successor to his mentor A. G. Street, and from the 1950s on, he established himself as a national figure, known for his books, his column in The Guardian, and his radio and television work. On 15 April 1957, he was Roy Plomley's guest on Desert Island Discs, choosing music by Elgar, Vaughan Williams, Mendelssohn, Strauss, Parry, Paul Robeson, and Bill Haley.

In 1924, Wightman married Margaret Dorothy Wiggins. He died on 28 May 1971 at Dorchester Hospital after a severe fall in which he had broken his skull. His address at the time was Tudor House, Puddletown.

== In popular culture ==
Wightman was the model for the countryman Arthur Fallowfield, a comic character created by Kenneth Williams in Beyond Our Ken, notable for his Dorset accent and his catch-phrase "the answer lies in the soil".

== Books ==
- Moss Green Days: talks on English country life (Westhouse, 1948)
- My Homeward Road (London: 1950)
- Arable Farming (Country Books No. 5, 1951)
- Watching the Certain Things (London: Cassell, 1951)
- Livestock Farming (Country Books No. 7, 1952)
- Days on the Farm: with an introduction by Francis Dillon (London: Hutchinson, 1952, illustrated by Clifford Webb)
- The Seasons (London: Cassell, 1953)
- The Wessex Heathland (London: Robert Hale, 1953)
- Revolution on the Land (Newman Neame, 1956)
- Rural Rides: with Ralph Wightman through Cobbett's England (London: Cassell, 1957)
- Hayfork and Combine (Newman Neame, 1960)
- Abiding Things (London: Cassell, 1962)
- Portrait of Dorset, (London, Robert Hale, 1st edition 1965)
- Take Life Easy (Pelham Books, 1968)
- The Countryside Today (Pelham Books, 1970)
- Wallace's Ground (Pelham Books, 1971)
