= Sara Nathan (journalist) =

English journalist and newspaper columnist

- Born: 3 September 1977 (age 48); England, United Kingdom
- Years active: c. 2000–present

Sara Nathan (born 3 September 1977) is an English journalist and newspaper columnist.

She helped launch The Sun's successful TV Biz column in 2003 and was editor from 2005 to 2009. She joined the Daily Mail newspaper as showbusiness editor in October 2009 after 10 years at The Sun. She studied at the City of London School for Girls and City University.

In September 2012, she moved to New York City and was MailOnline's U.S. showbusiness editor-at-large until March 2015. She was executive editor at People, where she revamped the website, before joining the New York Post as editor-at-large in 2018.
