= Royal Motor Company =

Defunct American motor vehicle manufacturer

Royal Motor Car Company Royal Tourist Car Company
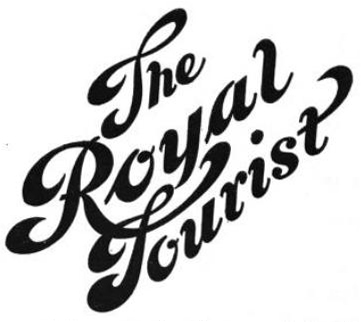
- First among the Best

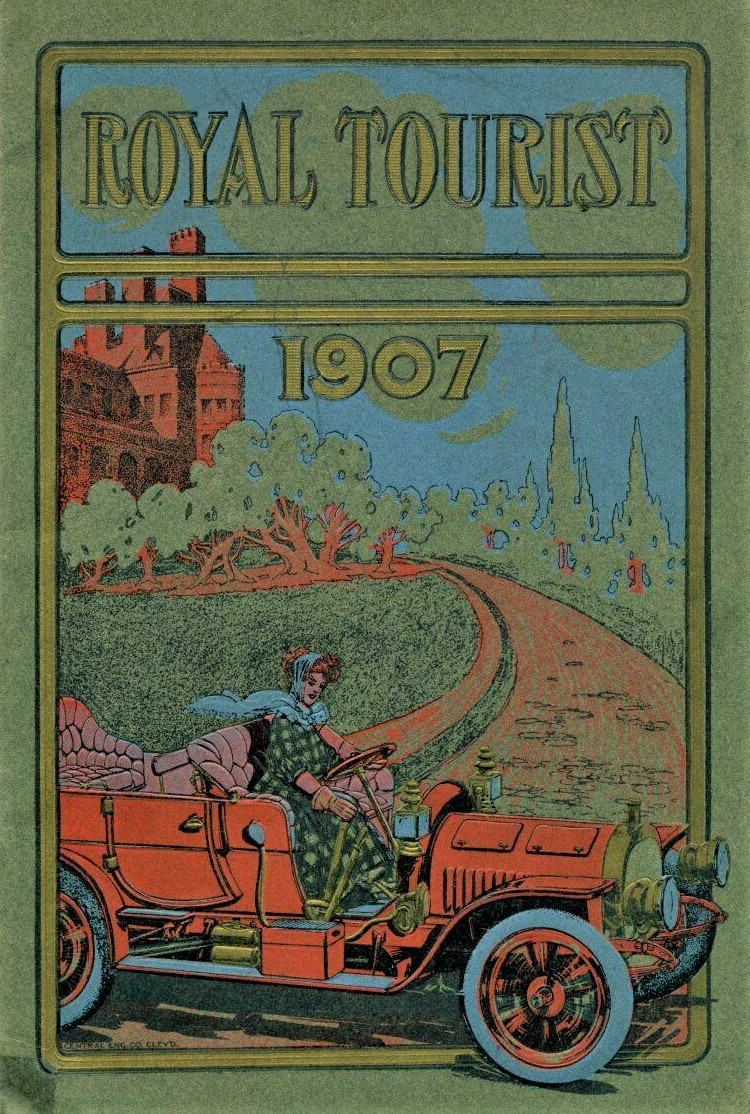
- 1907 Royal Tourist brochure cover
- Industry: Automotive
- Predecessor: Hoffman Automobile Company
- Founded: 1904; 122 years ago
- Founder: Edward Schurmer
- Defunct: 1911; 115 years ago
- Fate: Merger
- Successor: Consolidated Motor Car Company
- Headquarters: Cleveland, Ohio, United States
- Key people: Edward Schurmer, Robert Jardine, George Dunham
- Products: Automobiles

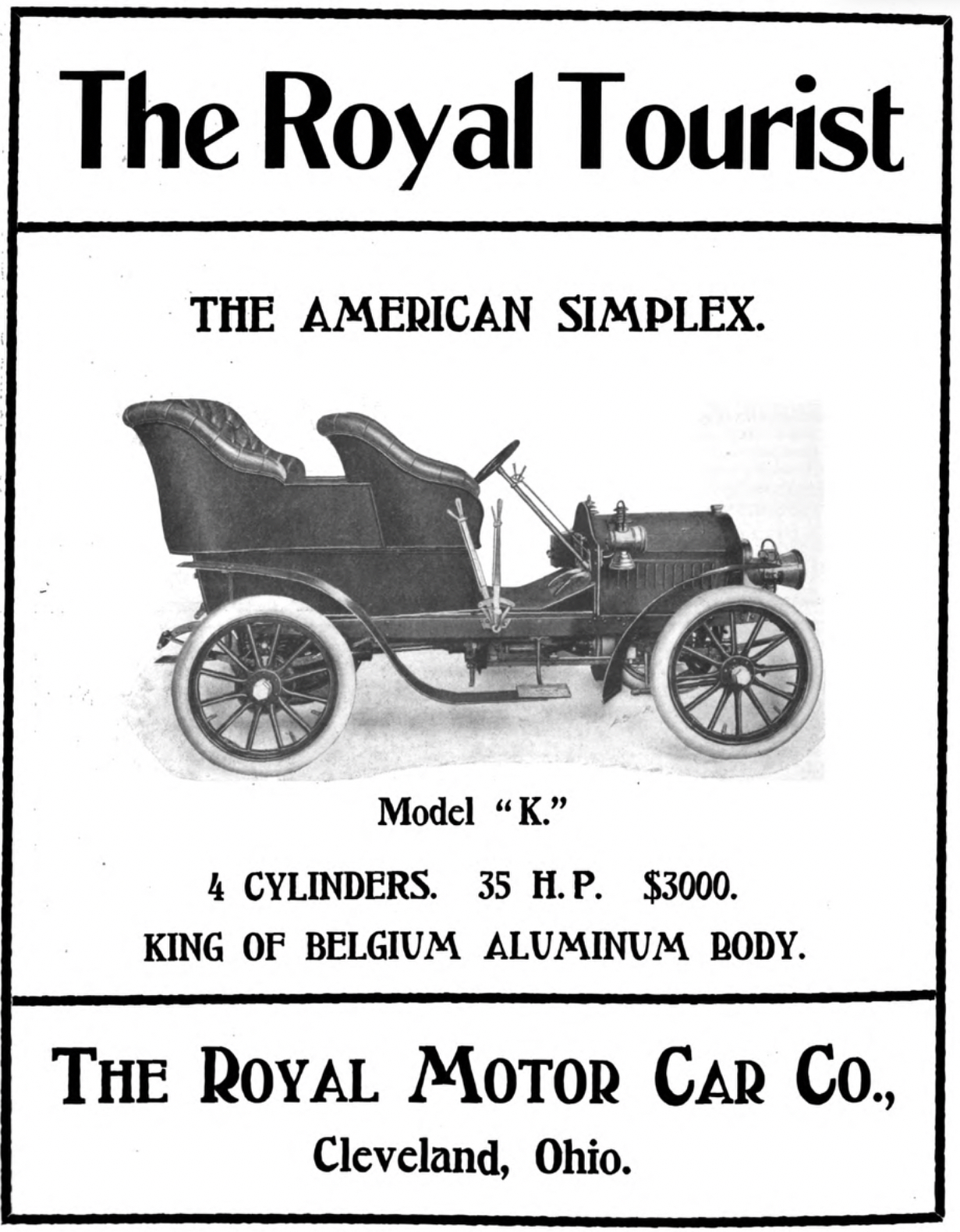
Royal Tourist Model K (1904)

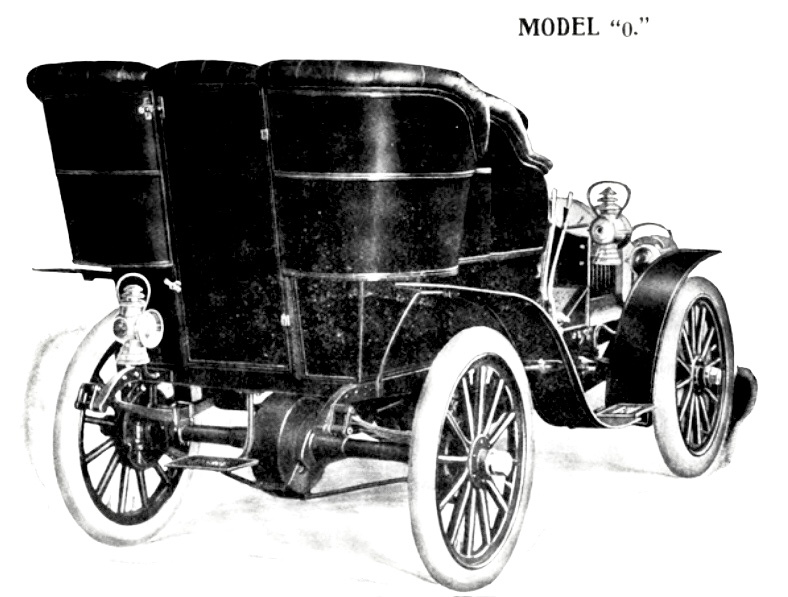
Royal Tourist Model O (18 HP) (1904)

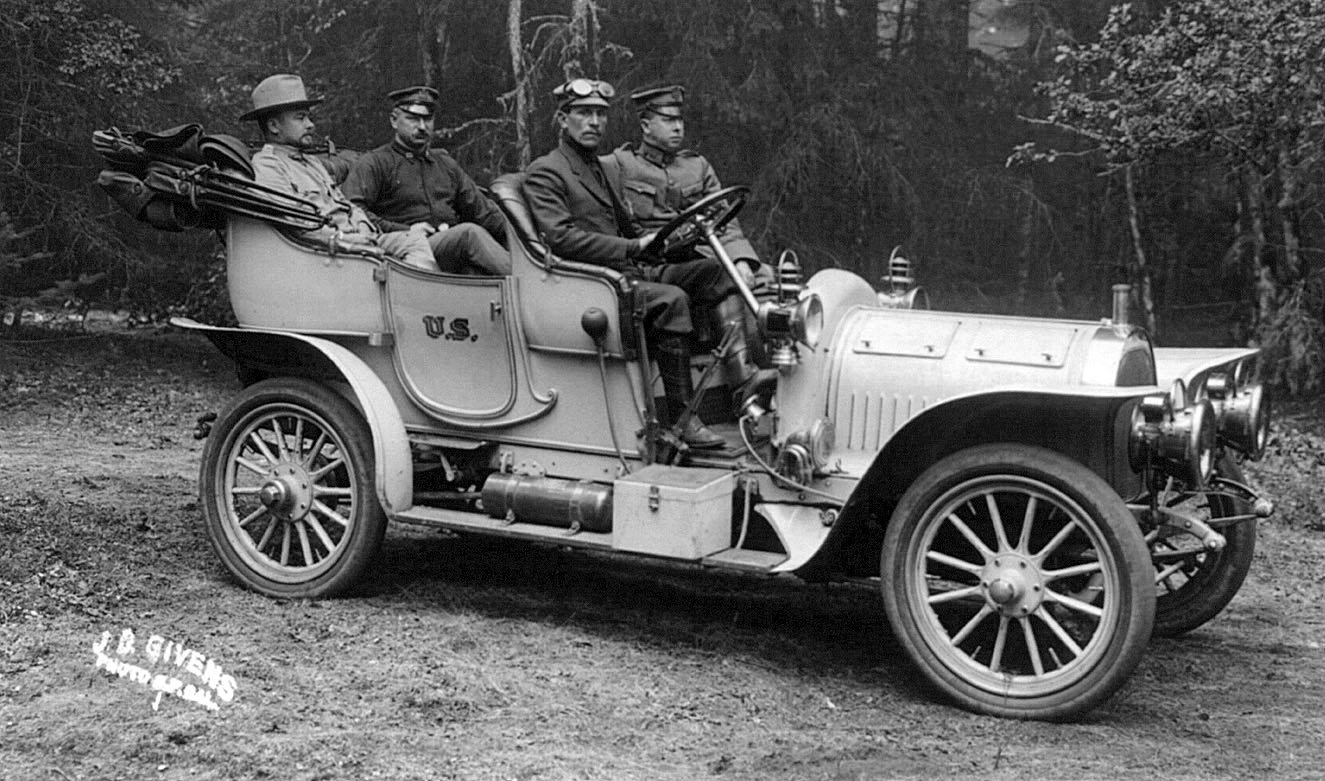
A Royal Tourist of the US Army, used by General Frederick Funston.

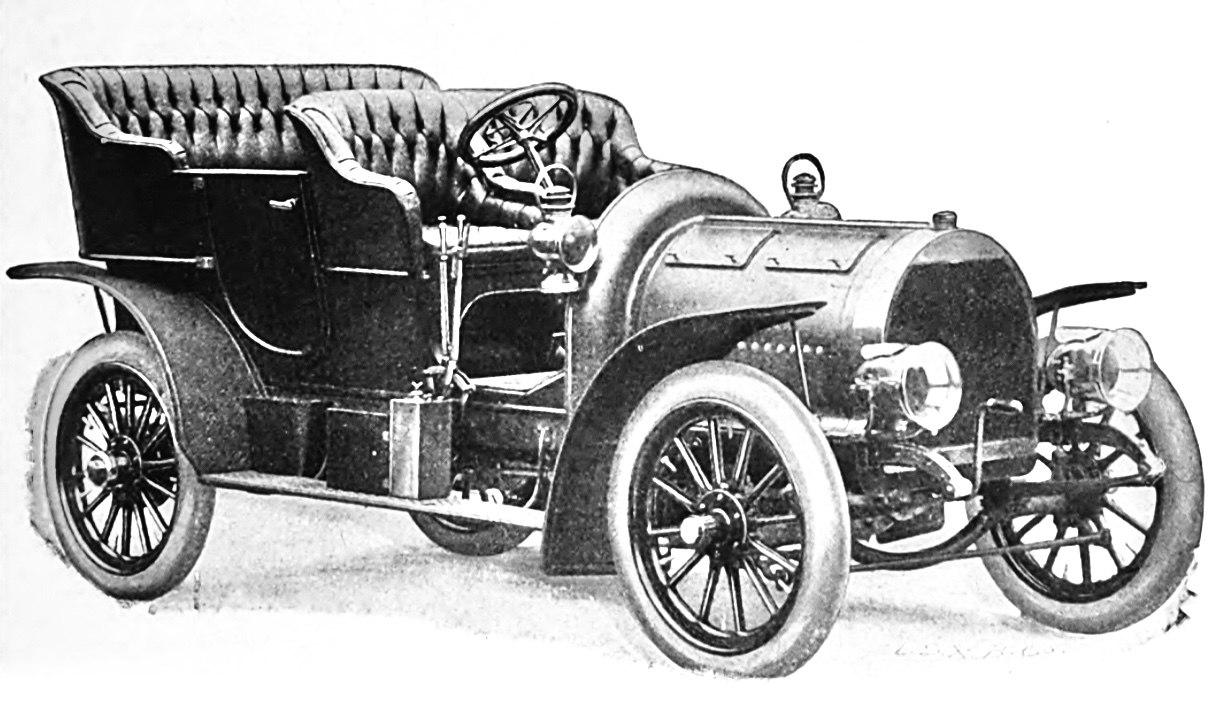
Royal Tourist Model F (32/38HP) 1905

Royal Motor Car Company was a Brass Era manufacturer of luxury automobiles in Cleveland, Ohio, in business from 1904 to 1911. It was the result of a reorganization of the Hoffman Automobile Company.

== History ==
In November 1903, Edward Shurmer took over the Hoffman Automobile Company and reorganized it as the Royal Motor Car Company. For 1904 the new company introduced the Royal Tourist, a touring car model. Equipped with a tonneau, it could seat five passengers and sold for $2,300, equivalent to $82,417 in 2025. The Model O has a vertically mounted water-cooled straight-twin, situated at the front of the car and producing 16 hp (11.9 kW). A three-speed sliding transmission was fitted and the pressed steel-framed car weighed 1700 lb (771 kg). A modern cellular radiator was used, and the car rivaled the offerings of cross-town rival, Peerless.

Later that same year a 4-cylinder 32/35-hp Model K was introduced on the same chassis, priced at $3,000, and for 1904 total production was 100 cars. Robert Jardine, a Frenchman with extensive European experience was hired as the chief engineer.

The twin-cylinder was dropped and the company built successively larger motor cars, increasing to 40 and 45-hp and priced from $3,500 to $4,000. In 1907 a $5,000 (equivalent to $172,768 in 2025) limousine was introduced. In 1905 a factory Royal Tourist participated in the Vanderbilt Cup trials but was not selected for the race. The Royal Tourist was extensively advertised as the car that placed third in the trials.

Royal Tourists were known as big, luxurious and reliable cars and used the slogan "The Pink of Perfection” in early advertising. The roundness of radiator, hood and cowl was a distinguishing design of the Royal Tourist for all of its production. In 1906, the first reorganization occurred and the company was renamed the Royal Motor Car & Manufacturing Company.

In September 1907 the Royal Tourist moved into a new factory. In November 1907, with the effects of the Panic of 1907, the company went into receivership. In December 1908, a court judge authorized the sale of the company's assets to a new corporation named the Royal Tourist Car Company, headed by Bostonian, George Dunham.

Robert Jardine had developed a six-cylinder motor for the Royal Tourist but the financial issues resulted in its cancellation. A novel idea for 1909 Royal Tourist's was Its horn placed under the hood, with only the bulb for sounding it at the center of the steering wheel hub. This was claimed as a first.

In March, 1911 Royal Tourist Car Company merged with Croxton Motor Car Company of Cleveland and the Acme Body & Veneer Company of Rahway, New Jersey to form the Consolidated Motor Car Company. Herbert Croxton was president and Edward Schurmer was treasurer. Robert Jardine left and joined the engineering department of Jeffery in Kenosha, Wisconsin. Within a few months the merger fell apart and the Royal Tourist was discontinued. The F. B. Stearns Company of Cleveland purchased many of the assets.

== Production models ==
- Royal Motor Company Model N
- Royal Motor Company Model G
- Royal Motor Company Model H
- Royal Motor Company Model J
- Royal Motor Company Model M
- Royal Tourist Model O
- Royal Motor Company Tourist Runabout
- Royal Motor Company Model X
- Royal Motor Company Model Y
- Royal Motor Company Model MC

== Advertisements ==
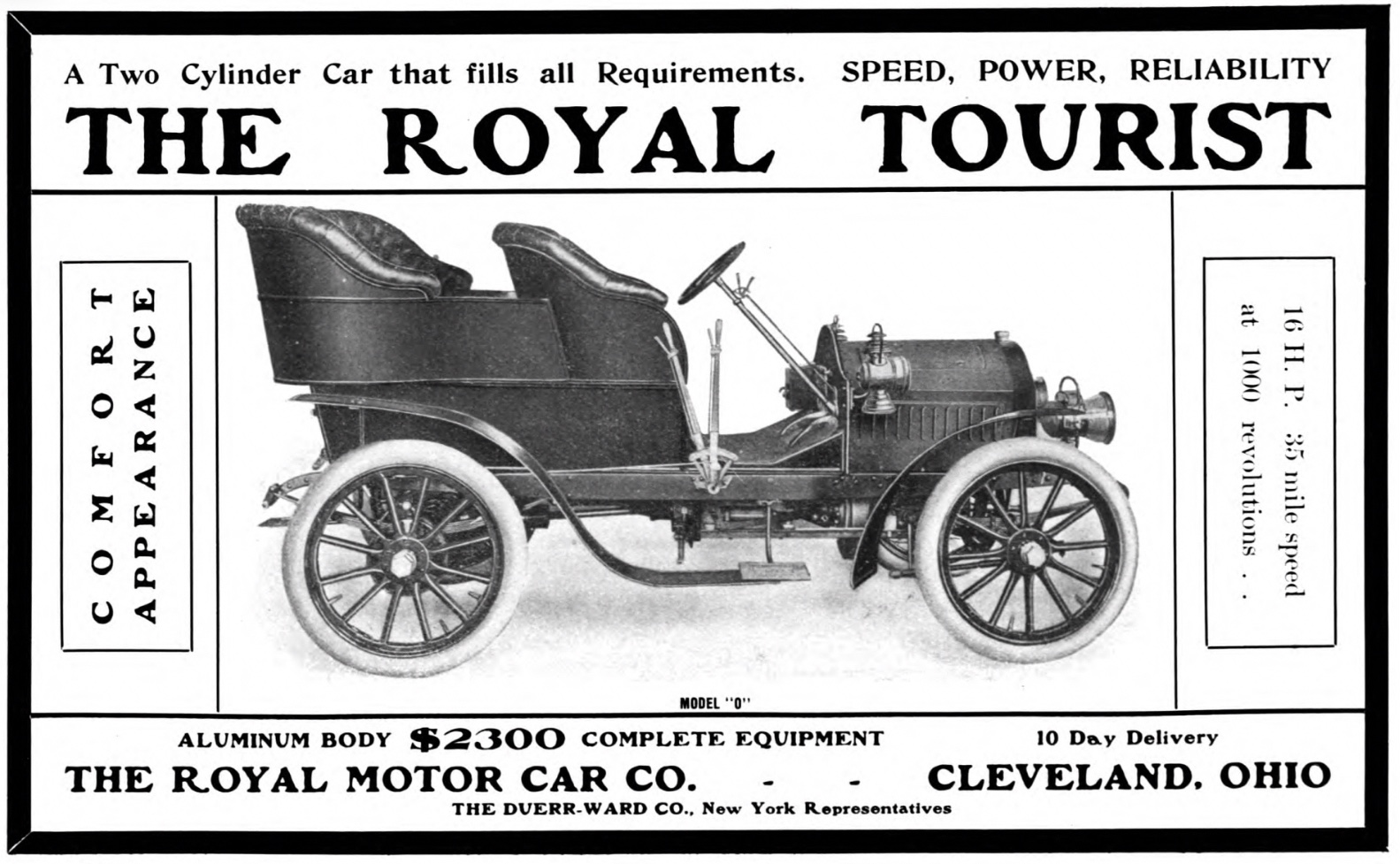
Royal Tourist Model O (1904)

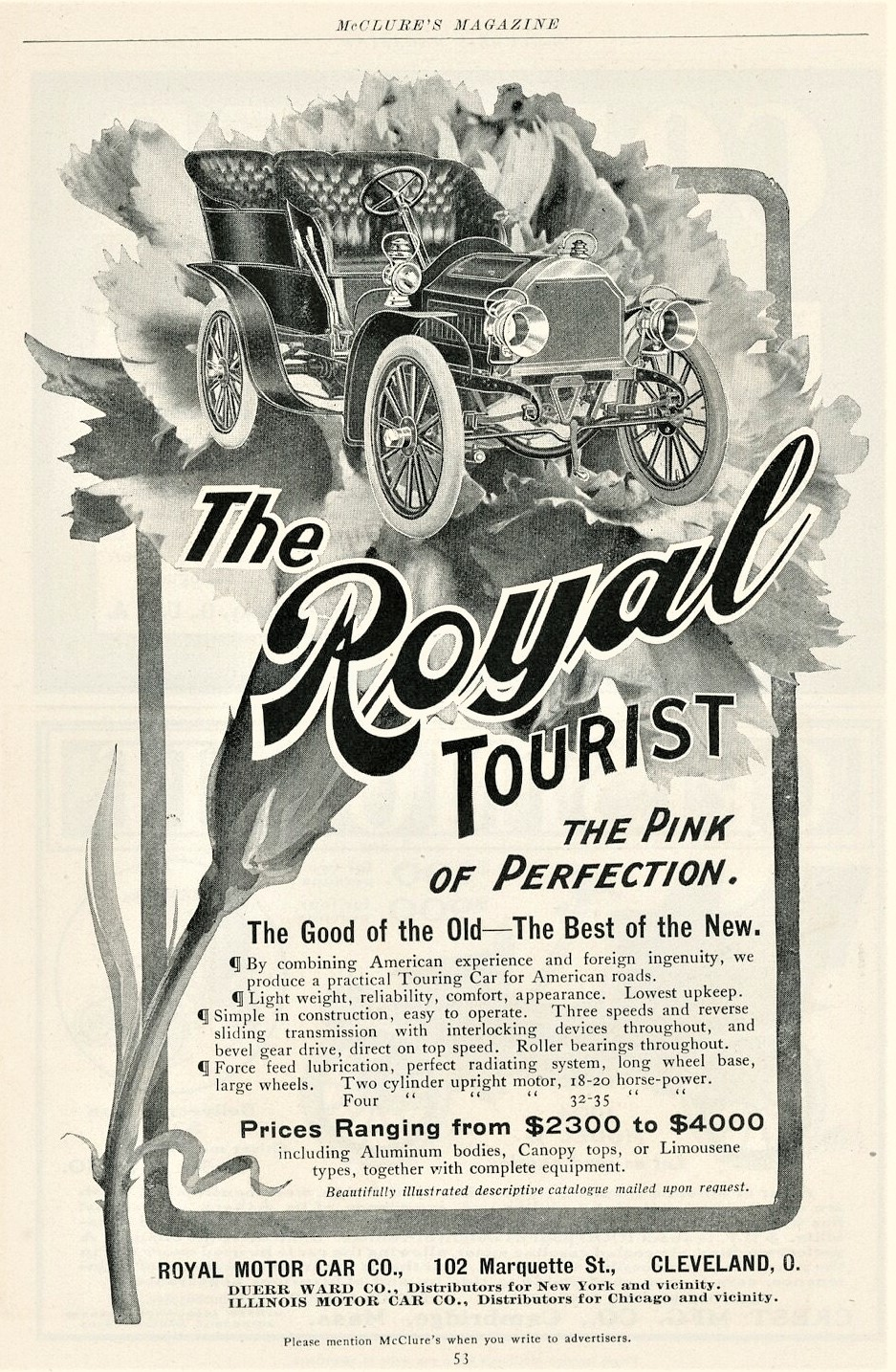
1904 Royal Tourist advertisement

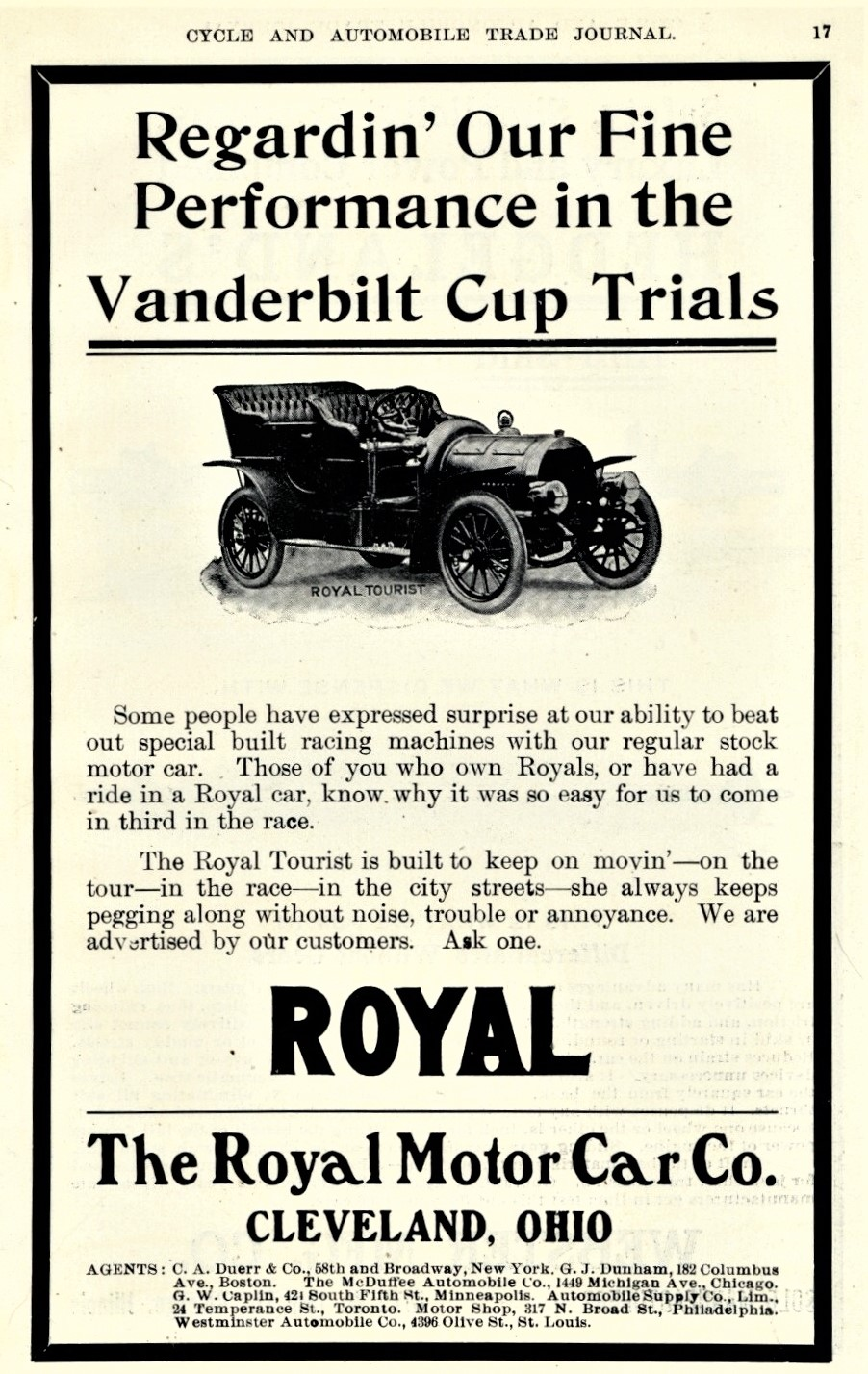
1906 Royal Tourist advertisement

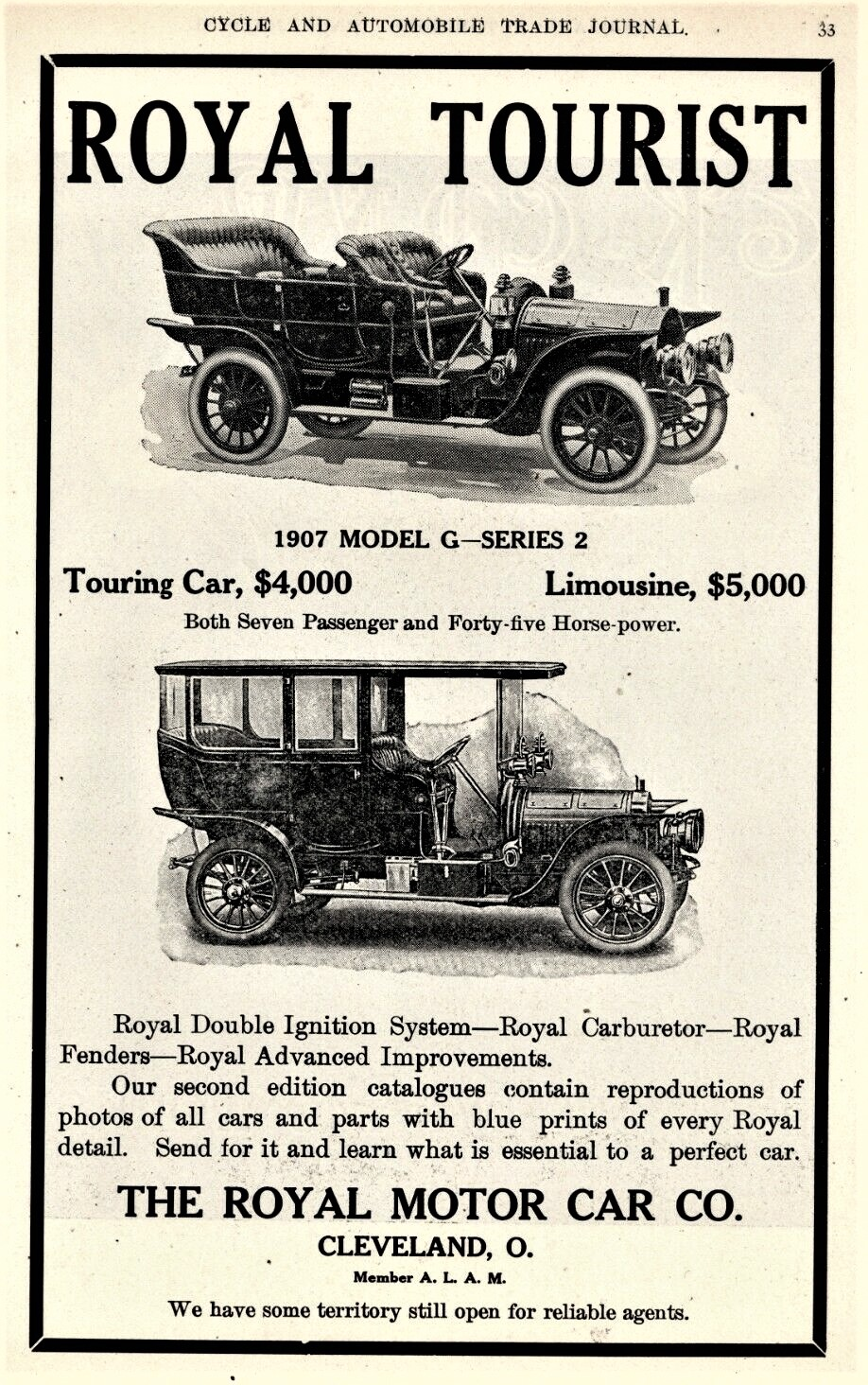
1907 Royal Tourist advertisement

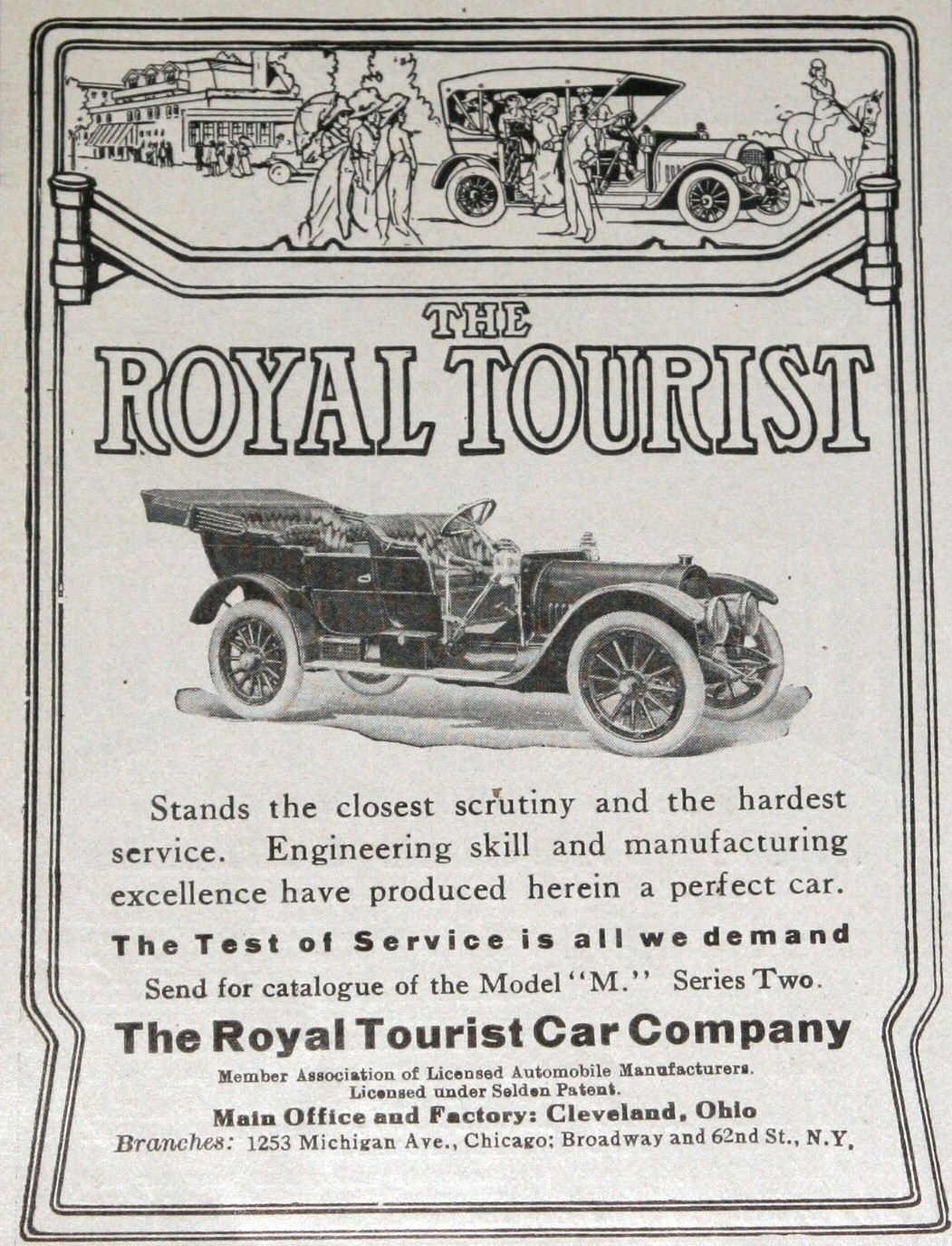
1910 Royal Tourist advertisement

== Model Gallery ==
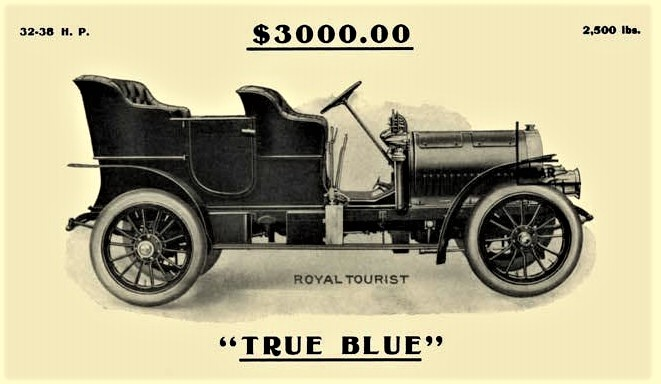
1905 Model F 32/38 hp 4-cylinder Touring Car

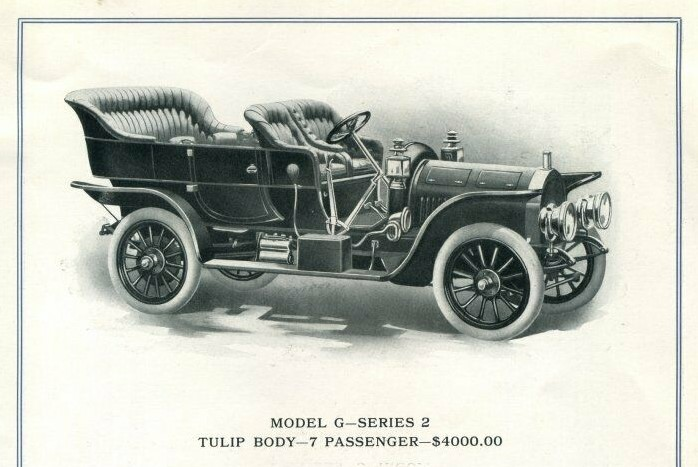
1907 Model G 45 hp Tulip Body Touring Car

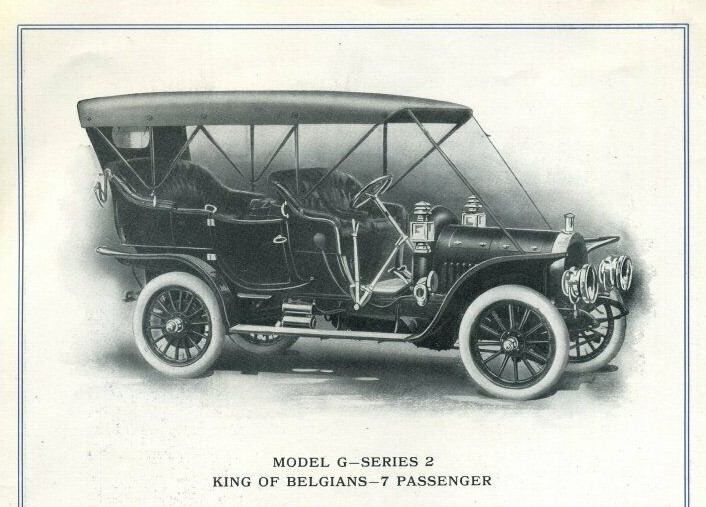
1907 Model G 45 hp 'King of Belgians' Body Touring Car

== See also ==
- The Royal Tourist in the Vanderbilt Cup Races
- Royal Tourist at ConceptCarz
- Frank Leslie's Popular Monthly (January, 1904)
