= Sylvia Agnes Sophia Tait =

English biochemist

- Born: Sylvia Wardropper; 8 January 1917; Tyumen, Siberia
- Died: 28 February 2003 (aged 86); Lymington, Hampshire
- Education: King's College, London; University College London
- Spouses: Anthony Simpson (1940–41); James Francis Tait (m. 1956)
- Scientific career
- Fields: Endocrinology
- Workplaces: Courtauld Institute of Biochemistry

Sylvia Agnes Sophia Tait (née Wardropper, 8 January 1917 – 28 February 2003, known as Sylvia Simpson from 1941 to 1956) was an English biochemist. She worked with her second husband, James Francis Tait, from 1948 until her death in 2003, a partnership described by the Oxford Dictionary of National Biography as "one of the most successful examples of husband-wife scientific collaboration". Together, they discovered and identified the hormone aldosterone, the last of a series of naturally occurring biologically potent steroid hormones to be isolated and identified between the 1920s to the 1950s, after the androgens, oestrogens, and glucocorticoid hormones. Aldosterone is part of the mechanism that regulates blood pressure, and causes conservation of sodium, secretion of potassium, increased water retention, and increased blood pressure. It is thought to be responsible for 15 per cent of cases of high blood pressure.

== Early life ==
Tait was born in Tyumen in Siberia, the daughter of Scottish agronomist and trader James Wardropper and his Russian wife Ludmilla. Her mother had obtained a degree in mathematics from the University of Moscow in the Russian Empire.

She returned with her family to the UK in 1920, living in Ealing, and her father became a civil engineer. She was educated at Ealing County School for Girls, specialising in languages. She spoke fluent Russian, and improved her German by spending time with relatives in Germany before the Second World War. She suffered a knee injury playing netball at school, and later underwent three knee replacements.

She continued her language studies at King's College, London, and but then moved to University College London and graduated with a degree in zoology in 1939. She married Anthony Simpson, a fellow zoology student at University College London and a pilot with RAF Coastal Command, in 1940. He was killed in Norway in October 1941.

== Academic career ==
She started to use her married name, Simpson, and joined the team of Professor J. Z. Young in Oxford around 1941, undertaking scientific research on nerve regeneration.

In 1944, she moved to the Courtauld Institute of Biochemistry at Middlesex Hospital Medical School in London, working on synthetic analgesics to replace opiates, in a team that included Peter Claringbould Williams, Edward Charles Dodds and Wilfrid Lawson. She also worked on oestrogens with Williams and A. E. Wilder-Smith, developing expertise in bioassays. She started to work on adrenal steroids with James Francis Tait in 1948, building on work by Ralph Dorfman. They developed techniques to detect adrenal steroids on paper chromatograms using ultraviolet light. They were a part of an international collaboration that discovered a previously unknown biologically active compound, which they called electrocortin. It soon became clear that this was a new hormone, secreted by the mammalian adrenal gland, later renamed aldosterone after its structure was determined. Their collaborators included the eminent Swiss chemist Tadeus Reichstein, who was one of the recipients of the Nobel Prize in Physiology or Medicine in 1950 for similar work on cortisol. The discovery was published in Nature in a paper, "Isolation of a highly active mineralocorticoid from beef adrenal extract" in 1952.

She married a second time, to James Tait, in September 1956, and adopted her new married surname Tait for professional purposes, causing some confusion. She and her second husband both became Fellows of the Royal Society in 1959. They were the second married couple to become FRSs, after Queen Victoria and Prince Albert, and the first married couple to be elected to Fellowship on the same day.

The Taits continued to undertake scientific research together, and moved to the Worcester Foundation for Experimental Biology in Shrewsbury, Massachusetts, working with Gregory Pincus. There they worked on adrenal zona glomerulosa cells. They spent some time at the Physiology Department at the University of Melbourne in Australia in about 1960 and at the Howard Florey Institute. They returned to Middlesex Hospital Medical School in 1970, where James Tait became Professor of Physics as Applied to Medicine and they were co-directors of the Biophysical Endocrinology Unit.

== Later life ==
The Taits retired in 1982 and moved to East Boldre in the New Forest, but continued scientific research using simulations on using two Apple IIe computers running in parallel.

Tait suffered from leg ulcers in her later years, and then developed a heart condition. She died of renal and heart failure at Lymington Hospital in Hampshire, less than two months before a meeting in London in April 2003 to celebrate the 50th anniversary of the discovery and identification of aldosterone. Her husband also missed the meeting as he was under treatment for diabetes in Royal Bournemouth Hospital.

At the time of her death, she was the most senior woman FRS living in Britain (Martha Vogt, then living in San Diego, was the senior woman fellow). She was also a member of the British Society for Endocrinology, the American Endocrine Society and the American Association for the Advancement of Science.
