= Melinda Camber Porter =

English painter

- Born: Melinda Camber; 18 September 1953; London, England, UK
- Died: 9 October 2008 (aged 55); Sag Harbor, New York, U.S.
- Known for: Painting, Journalism, novelist, poet
- Movement: Modernism

Melinda Camber Porter (18 September 1953 – 9 October 2008) was an English artist, author, poet, journalist and filmmaker, a modernist who worked in oils, watercolor and ink. She was known for combining the mediums of film, painting and writing.

Her works have been shown at The School of Visual Arts in New York, Oxford University, the Embassy of France, La Maison Francaise and Lincoln Center's Clark Theatre. Her paintings, poetry and films have been critically well received. As a journalist, Porter interviewed renowned writers, artists and filmmakers over several decades for The Times.

== Early life and education ==
Melinda Camber was born on 18 September 1953 in London and grew up on Wimpole Street. Her father was a psychoanalyst who kept his offices in the family home in the center of London's medical district. From early on, she was exposed to the arts, frequenting the National Gallery, and immersing herself in drawing and painting.

She attended school at the City of London School for Girls, and was awarded scholarships to both Oxford and Cambridge. In honour of this, the school granted the students a day off, a privilege normally reserved only for the death of royalty. She chose Oxford and earned a First Class Honours degree in Modern Languages (French and Latin), graduating from Lady Margaret Hall in 1974. After graduation, she met John Robert Porter, the son of Sir Leslie Porter and Dame Shirley Porter; the couple wed in Paris and lived on the Quai Voltaire overlooking the Louvre.

== Family life ==
Camber Porter married her second husband, Joseph Flicek, on 2 July 1985 in his native South Dakota, and they honeymooned in China. She based a series of paintings and the novel Floating Boundary on the trip to China. Frequent visits with Flicek's family in South Dakota inspired her novel Badlands. The couple divided their time between Manhattan and Sag Harbor. Porter and Flicek had two sons. After Porter was diagnosed with ovarian cancer, the family took up permanent residence in Sag Harbor for her convalescence. Porter died on 9 October 2008 at the age of 55.

== Early career ==
While in Paris, Porter was a French cultural correspondent for The Times. She interviewed many notable figures including François Truffaut and Louis Malle. She profiled directors Mike Nichols and Ingmar Bergman. A number of these interviews became part of her book, Through Parisian Eyes: Reflections on Contemporary French Arts and Culture.

== Publications ==
=== Fine arts ===
- Fashion in the Time of Queen Elizabeth I (Blake Press, 2015)
- Luminous Bodies: Circles of Celebration (Blake Press, 2015)
- Luminous Bodies: Circles of Mourning (Blake Press, 2015)

=== Non-fiction ===
- Melinda Camber Porter in Conversation with Eugenio Montale (Blake Press, 2015)
- Melinda Camber Porter in Conversation with Wim Wenders (Blake Press, 2015)
- Melinda Camber Porter in Conversation with Roy Lichtenstein (Blake Press, 2015)
- Melinda Camber Porter in Conversation with Octavio Paz (Blake Press, 2016)
- Melinda Camber Porter in Conversation with Joyce Carol Oates (Blake Press, 2017)
- My Polaroid Selfies, 1981 (Blake Press, 2017)
- Through Parisian Eyes: Reflections on Contemporary French Arts and Culture (Blake Press, 2017)
- Art of Love: Love Poems and Paintings (Writers and Readers Publishing, Inc., 1993)
- The Arousal of Nature (2004)
- Visions on Film: Portraits of Leading Contemporary Film Directors (2009)
- William Blake Illuminates the Works of Melinda Camber Porter (2006)

=== Novels ===
- Frank – foreword by Saul Bellow
- Boat Child: A Comedy (pub. 1994)
- Badlands (Writers and Readers Publishing, Inc., 1996) Book of the Month Club selection
- Imogen
- Floating Boundary – Book One: Hong Kong
- Floating Boundary – Book Two: China Arrives
- Floating Boundary – Book Three: Freedom or Tyranny
- Child of the Western World

=== Poetry ===
- St Julian. With a drawing by Rigby Graham (Cog Press, 1973)

=== Stage plays ===
- Journey to Benares’ A Rock Opera (perf. Asia Society Museum, NY)
- Night Angel (perf. Lincoln Center's Clark Theater)
- Boat Child (perf. Denver Center for the Performing Arts)

=== Documentary films ===
- Vision on Film: Michael Apted (shorts I and II)
- Luminous Journey (short)
- The Art of Love: Paintings and Writings of Melinda Camber Porter (public television program 1994–1998)
- Sacred Journey (television – Vision Television and APTN Canada 2001–2004)
- Joyce Beroneo on Photography
- The Kitchen (Paris in the 1970s)

=== Unfinished works ===
- Martin Scorsese – Visions on Film (documentary feature)
- Michael Apted – Visions on Film (documentary feature)
- Wim Wenders – Visions on Film (documentary feature)
- Recuperation Series – watercolors, oils, poetry
- A New Cosmology in Modern Art: Melinda Camber Porter (biography on the artist)

Following Porter's death in 2008, her husband Joe Flicek organised an informal advisory committee to help organise and publish her work.

== Public exhibitions ==
- British Consulate New York – A Retrospective of Ms. Porter's Art and Literature – 2006
- School of Visual Arts New York – Because of William Blake a New Art −2006
- Paul Labrecque Salons New York – The Art of Horses and Lovers – 2005
- Walter Wickiser Gallery New York – The Arousal of Nature – 2005
- Art for Healing Gallery New York – The Art of Healing – 2005
- Oxford University UK – William Blake Illuminates Ms. Porter's Works (lecture by Robin Hamlyn, Senior curator of prints and drawings for Tate Museum) – 2004
- Asia Society and Museum New York – Journey to Benares, a Rock Opera – 2003
- Southampton College Southampton, NY – Native America Spirituality – 1999
- The Nicolaysen Art Museum Casper WY – Art of Horses and Lovers – 1997
- The Sioux Falls Civic Fine Arts Center SD – Badlands, Horses and Lovers – 1996
- The Salon Des Artistes New York – The Film Censor's Step-Daughter – 1996
- The Foothills Art Center Golden, CO – Badlands, Horses and Lovers – 1996
- Lincoln Center New York – Night Angel, a One-Woman Musical – 1996
- The West Hartford Art League – Ms. Porter's French Art, Film & Literature – 1995
- L'Alliance Française de New Orleans – Ms. Porter's French Art, Film & Literature – 1995
- The Embassy of France Washington DC – Ms. Porter's French Art, Film & Literature – 1994
- L'Alliance Française de Miami – Ms. Porter's French Art, Film & Literature – 1994
- L'Alliance Française de San Francisco – Ms. Porter's French Art, Film & Literature – 1994
- L'Alliance Française de Houston – Ms. Porter's French Art, Film & Literature – 1994
- L'Alliance Française de Chicago – Ms. Porter's French Art, Film & Literature – 1994
- The French Library in Boston – Ms. Porter's French Art, Film & Literature −1994
- National Theatre Conservatory of Denver – Boat Child, a Comedy – 1993
- The French Cultural Embassy New York – Ms. Porter's French Art, Film & Literature – 1993

== Journalism ==
Melinda Camber Porter reported on French cultural life for The Times in the 70s and 80s. Many of these pieces were later included in the book Through Parisian Eyes.

- Marcel Carné Paris, 1978.
- Marguerite Duras Paris, 1975.
- Eugène Ionesco Oxford, 1974.
- Roy Lichtenstein
- Louis Malle Paris, 1975.
- Andre Malraux Paris, 1975.
- Eugenio Montale Milan, 1976.
- Marcel Ophuls Paris, 1977.
- Octavio Paz Mexico, 1982.
- Alain Resnais Paris, 1985.
- Alain Robbe-Grillet Paris, 1974.
- Eric Rohmer Paris, 1975.
- Francoise Sagan Paris, 1978.
- Jean-Paul Sartre Paris, 1977.
- Bertrand Tavernier Paris, 1985.
- François Truffaut Paris, 1975.
- Roger Vadim Paris, 1975.
- Wim Wenders Paris, Texas, 1983.

== Critical praise ==
- The New York Times – "The subject of the sensual—what a human being can experience through the physical self and the senses, and the profound effect of that experience is at the heart of Ms. Camber Porter's output as both an artist and writer. . . This painter-novelist draws a line between erotic and obscene".
- The New York Times – "Sensuality is at the heart of Porter's work. Badlands is a narrative with a weighty sensuality".
- San Francisco Chronicle – "For those passionate about French arts and culture, Melinda Camber Porter's Through Parisian Eyes is like a daylong trip to the candy store. Porter's eclectic gathering provides an area of interest for almost every palate. A well-rounded, intelligent look at the contemporary Parisian spirit".
- Boston Sunday Globe – "Through Parisian Eyes is a particularly readable and brilliantly compiled collection. The voices of French intellectuals mingle in this uniquely constructed volume of interviews and commentary".
- Philadelphia Inquirer – "Through Parisian Eyes is an inviting opportunity to tap into Paris' thinking... thanks to Porter's willingness to listen well and challenge when necessary".
