= Rachel Burden =

British radio presenter

Rachel Mary Ann Cecilia Burden (born 22 January 1975 in Marlow, Buckinghamshire, England) is a newsreader, radio news reporter and presenter. She has presented the BBC Radio 5 Live weekday breakfast show since 2011. She is also one of the main weekend presenters of BBC Breakfast.

== Early life ==
The fourth of five children, Burden is the only daughter of former BBC journalist Paul Burden and his wife, and the niece of the actor Hugh Burden. Her maternal grandmother was from Skerries, County Dublin. One of her three older brothers was hit by a train, late at night on December 8 1987, a week after his 16th birthday, and killed.

She went to school from 1987 to 1993 at Wycombe High School, a girls' grammar school in High Wycombe, taking English, History, Politics and Practical Music at A-level. After graduating from Trinity College, Dublin, she studied broadcast journalism at Cardiff University.

== Career ==
Burden began her career as a reporter at BBC Radio Suffolk, and 15 months later joined BBC Radio Bristol where she co-hosted the early morning breakfast show, working alongside Nigel Dando, the brother of murdered presenter Jill Dando. She joined Radio 5 Live in 2003, the day before her father retired from the BBC. She took over the weekday breakfast show from Shelagh Fogarty in May 2011, alongside co-presenter Nicky Campbell. Burden made her debut on the BBC Breakfast television programme as a relief presenter on Saturday 23 August 2015.

In May 2025, Burden presented VE Day 80: We Were There; a BBC2 documentary which was part of the BBC's VE Day 80th anniversary celebrative programming.

== Personal life ==
Burden has been married to journalist Luke Mendham since 2004 and they have four children. The family live in Marthall, Cheshire.
