= Barbados Museum & Historical Society =

Coordinates: 13°4′56″N 59°36′9″W

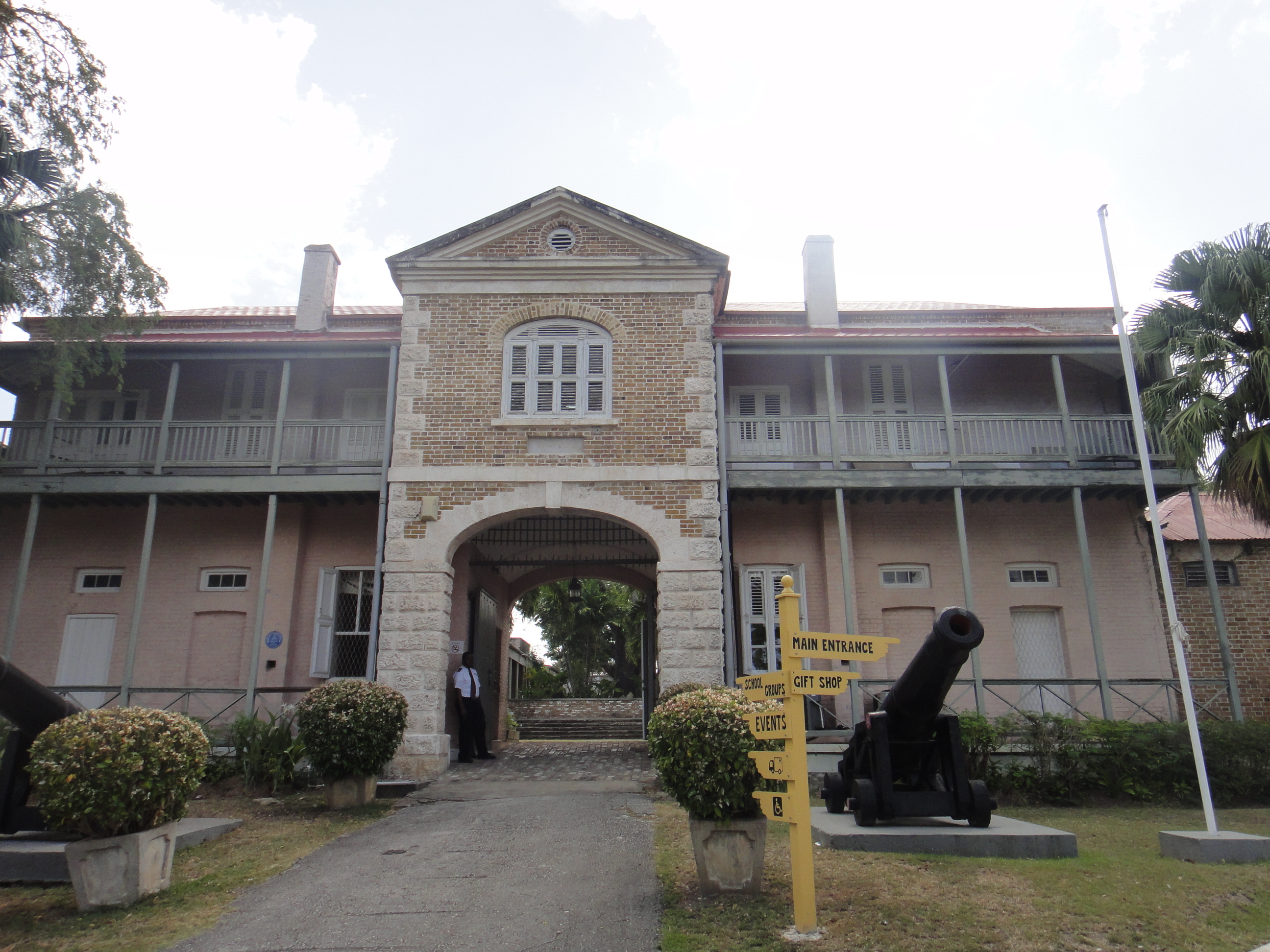
Barbados Museum & Historical Society.

The Barbados Museum & Historical Society is a private organization with public collections. Established in 1933 in the old Military Prison at the Saint Ann's historic Garrison, the museum has more than 500,000 artifacts that depict the island's rich history and natural history. Inclusive of some of these artifacts are antique maps of the island and paintings.

Notable members include Sir John Saint, who was President of the Society from 1946 to 1959.

In 1993 the BMH&S acquired the Newton Slave Burial Ground site located in Christ Church.
