= The Ellen Wilkinson School for Girls =

Foundation school in West Acton, Greater London

The Ellen Wilkinson School for girls

Location
- Queen's Drive; West Acton, Greater London, W3 0HW; England; 51.517064°N 0.286493°W

Information
- Type: Foundation school
- Established: 1974
- Local authority: Ealing
- Department for Education URN: 101941 Tables
- Ofsted: Reports
- Head teacher: R Kruger
- Gender: Girls
- Age: 11 to 19
- Enrolment: 1410
- Former name: Ealing Grammar School for Girls
- Website: www.ellenwilkinson.ealing.sch.uk

The Ellen Wilkinson School for Girls is a comprehensive, foundation secondary school for 1400 girls aged 11–19 years, located in the London borough of Ealing. The school is named after Ellen Wilkinson, one of the first female MPs in Britain, and the first female Minister for Education. It is near North Ealing tube station and West Acton tube station.

== History ==
=== Grammar school ===
It was known as Ealing County [Grammar] School for Girls. The school was evacuated to Wycombe High School in Buckinghamshire until July 1942.

=== Comprehensive ===
It became the Ellen Wilkinson School for Girls in 1974, a comprehensive school, from three schools – St Ann's Secondary Modern, the Wood End and The Grange schools. In April 1992 it became a grant-maintained school. In 1999 it became a foundation school.

== Academic ==
The current Headteacher is Ms R Kruger, who became head teacher in 2014, succeeding Ms C Sydenham.

== Buildings ==
In 2023, the school was one of those identified as having buildings that could be structurally unsound because reinforced autoclaved aerated concrete (RAAC) had been used in their construction. The areas out of action are the science blocks, the hall, canteen and old gym. However, works are undergoing to prop these up so will be safe for use soon.

== Notable former pupils ==
- Tina Daheley - journalist, newsreader and presenter

=== Ealing Grammar School for Girls ===
- Shirley Becke OBE - police officer
- Honor Blackman - actress
- Tina Daheley - BBC reporter
- Leonie Elliott - actor
- Dame Wendy Hall CBE - Professor of Computer Science since 1994 at the University of Southampton
- Maxine Nightingale - singer
- Gloria Obianyo - actor, nominated in the Ian Charleson Awards 2022
- Gillian Rose - philosopher
- Jacqueline Rose - Professor of English since 1992 at Queen Mary, University of London
- Sylvia Tait - biochemist and endocrinologist
