= Rosamund Flora Shove =

English botanist (1878–1954)

Rosamund Flora Shove FLS
- Born: c. 1878
- Died: 17 October 1954 (aged 76); Richmond, Greater London, England
- Education: Girton College, Cambridge
- Occupation: Botanist
- Employer: Maria Grey Training College
- Organization: Linnean Society of London

Rosamund Flora Shove FLS (c. 1878 – 17 October 1954) was an English botanist and science educator. She was a fellow of the Linnean Society of London, taught at Maria Grey Training College and published a paper on the stem of the angiopteris evecta fern.

== Biography ==
Shove was born c. 1878. Educated at Blackheath High School, she won a Pfeiffer Scholarship to study natural sciences Girton College, Cambridge from 1889 to 1896, before women were permitted to be granted degrees by the institution. She therefore received her MA from Trinity College, Dublin. She was trained in research by Albert Seward.

In 1900, Shove published a paper on the stem of the angiopteris evecta fern in the Annals of Science.

Much of Shove's career was spent teaching science in schools, including Notting Hill High School. She then taught botany and hygiene at universities and training colleges, including the University of Leeds, where she served as honorary secretary for a society to promote scientific discussion. From 1921 to 1938, she was a lecturer in Biology at the Maria Grey Training College in Isleworth, Middlesex.

In 1937 she became honorary secretary of the School Nature Study Union, and was credited with sustaining the Union through World War II. She edited its journal from 1940–1953, also contributing her own articles and film and book reviews as a member of a volunteer panel which viewed natural history films at the British Film Institute.

Shove was elected as a fellow of the Linnean Society of London, serving on the Society's council from 1943 to 1947.

Shove died on 17 October 1954 in Richmond, Greater London, England, aged 76. Her collection of plants was accepted into the collection of Kew Gardens.
