= Nancie Clifton Reynolds =

English domestic advice writer and broadcaster

- Born: Agnes Margaret Warden Hardie; 1903; Hampstead, London, England
- Died: 27 December 1931; Liverpool, England
- Education: Girton College, Cambridge
- Occupations: Domestic advice writer, lecturer, BBC broadcaster
- Known for: Promoting efficient household management and kitchen design
- Spouse: Clifton George Reynolds

Agnes Margaret Warden Hardie (1903 – 27 December 1931) kown as Nancie Clifton Reynolds was a British domestic advice writer, lecturer, and BBC broadcaster who championed efficient household management and modern kitchen design in the early 20th century.

== Early life and education ==
Agnes Margaret Warden Hardie was born in 1903 in Hampstead, London. She attended Girton College, Cambridge from 1923 to 1926, studying Economics for two years and History for one year. While at Cambridge, she met businessman Clifton George Reynolds (1891–1969), whom she married in 1926. After marriage, she began publishing under the name Mrs. N. Clifton Reynolds, or Nancie Clifton Reynolds.

== Career ==
After graduating, Reynolds worked with her husband at a factory in Merton, Surrey, manufacturing aluminium products including cooking utensils. The couple later opened a shop in Streatham called "Better Housekeeping".

Reynolds became an expert on applying scientific principles to household management, particularly addressing the needs of "servantless housewives". She wrote books and articles, gave demonstrations, and made radio broadcasts on domestic science topics.

Between 1927 and 1930, Reynolds made eight BBC radio broadcasts on domestic science, known as "Household Talks". The Radio Times noted that Reynolds' own home was "equipped with every modern convenience and laboursaving device".

Reynolds authored the book "Easier Housework by Better Equipment", published by Country Life in 1929. In this work, she championed the use of kitchen cabinets and other modern appliances to improve efficiency in the home. She was a strong proponent of the kitchen cabinet, a free-standing wooden cupboard with multiple doors and drawers that essentially functioned as a compact kitchen.

== Personal life and death ==
Nancie and Clifton George Reynolds had two daughters. The couple separated in 1931, with Reynolds relocating to Liverpool with their daughters Ann (2) and Jean (1). Nancie died on 27 December 1931 in Liverpool at the age of 28 due to sepsis following a bout of tonsillitis. Her youngest daughter, Jean, died ten days later.
