= Marion McQuillan =

British metallurgist

- Born: 30 October 1921; Watford
- Died: 24 June 1998 (aged 76)
- Other names: Marion Katharine Petch McQuillan; Marion Katharine Blight; Marion Katharine Petch
- Education: Girton College, Cambridge
- Occupation: metallurgist
- Known for: understanding the alloys of titanium

Marion McQuillan (30 October 1921 – 24 June 1998) was a British metallurgist who specialised in the engineering uses for titanium and its alloys. She researched jet engine metals and was on the first team to research titanium for the Royal Aircraft Establishment Farnborough (RAE).

== Biography ==
Marion Katherine Blight was born in Watford in 1921. Her mother worked in domestic service while her father was a shop assistant. McQuillan attended Wycombe High School before getting a scholarship to Henrietta Barnett’s School. McQuillan went to University in 1939 where she graduated from Girton College, Cambridge with a degree in metallurgy and natural sciences. She got her first job in 1942 in the Royal Aircraft Establishment Farnborough (RAE) in 1942. McQuillan researched jet engine metals and was a member of the first team to research titanium.

In 1946 she travelled through Germany and Austria as member of one of the many teams sent by the British Intelligence Objectives Sub-Committee, collecting technical information from universities, research establishments and factories.

She also worked at the Atomic Energy Research Establishment at Harwell, working on some of the early metallurgical problems of nuclear energy. From 1948–1951 she was at the Australian Royal Aircraft Establishment in Melbourne.

McQuillan returned to the UK where she began to work for ICI Metals (also known as IMI), in the Titanium Alloy Research Department where, within two years later she was head of the section. With her husband, McQuillan wrote the seminal book Titanium in 1956. During the 1960s McQuillan registered 8 titanium alloy patents. In 1967 McQuillan was appointed technical director of the New Metals Division and by 1978 she became the first woman managing director of Imperial Metal Industries subsidiary, Enots.

== Publications ==
Jun 1943. Further report on the use of aged chromate baths to specification DTD 911, Bath iii (30 minute hot chromate bath). Petch M K. RAE MR7147(A). Met/RTN/22

Feb 1944. Variations in corrosion properties over magnesium alloy sheet. Jones E R W Petch M K. RAE MR6858. Met/RTN/21, also in J. Inst. Metals, Nov. I946

Feb 1944. Protection of magnesium alloy sheet to specification DTD 118 by a modified form of the I.G. acid dip (bath iv of specification.DTD 911). Petch M K. RAE MR7588. Met/RTN/23

Mar 1944. Protection of magnesium alloys against corrosion by electrolytic chromate films. Petch M K. RAE MR3726(D). Met/RTN/17

Nov 1944. The protection of magnesium alloy components against corrosion by sprayed coatings of "Thickal" Latex. Petch M K. RAE MR7290. Met/RTN/22

1949. Some Observations on the Behaviour of Platinum/Platinum-Rhodium Thermocouples at High Temperatures. M K McQuillan. Journal of Scientific Instruments, Volume 26, Number 10

1956. Titanium - Metallurgy of the Rarer Metals – 4. by McQuillan MK.; Publisher: London, Butterworths, 1956.

1956. Titanium. McQuillan, A. D.; McQuillan, M. K.; Castle, J. G.Physics Today, vol. 9, issue 10, p. 24. Publication Date: 00/1956

1956. Titanium. Alan Dennis McQuillan; Marion Katharine McQuillan. Publisher: New York : Academic Press; London : Butterworths Scientific Publications, 1956.

1957. Titanium. Alan D MacQuillan; Marion Katharine Macquillan. Publisher: London Butterworth [1957]

1958. Titan. Alan Denis McQuillan; Marion Katharine McQuillan; Sergej Georgievič Glazunov; Leonid Pavlovič Lužnikov.Language: Russian. Publisher: Moskva: Gosudarstvennoe Naučno-Tehničeskoe Izdatel'stvo Literatury po Černoj i Cvetnoj Metallurgii, 1958.

1978. McQuillan, Marion. Graduate Engineers in Production. Cranfield Inst of Tech, 1978.

1979. Graduate myth. Production Engineer (Volume: 58, Issue: 4, April 1979 )

== Patents ==
- GB772534A Improvements in or relating to titanium base alloys
- CH457874A Verfahren zur Wärmebehandlung einer Titanlegierung
- GB929931A Titanium-base alloys and their heat treatment
- US3007824A Method of heat treating a ti-be alloy
- US3118828A Electrode structure with titanium alloy base
- FI35168A Sätt att framställa en elektrod
- DE1112838B Verfahren zum Oberflaechenhaerten von (ª‡ú½ª‰) Ti-Legierungen

== Awards ==
McQuillan was awarded the Rosenhain Medal in 1965. She was on the Interservices Metallurgical Research Council until 1989 and in 1967 served as vice-president of the Institute of Metals. In 1968 she was fundamental to the First International Conference on Titanium in London.

== Personal life ==
She married fellow metallurgist Norman Petch whom she met in Cambridge but they divorced in 1944. She went on to marry metallurgist, Alan Dennis McQuillam in 1947. Her husband died in 1987. McQuillan died in Gloucestershire in 1998.
