= Hoffman (Cleveland automobile) =

Defunct American motor vehicle manufacturer

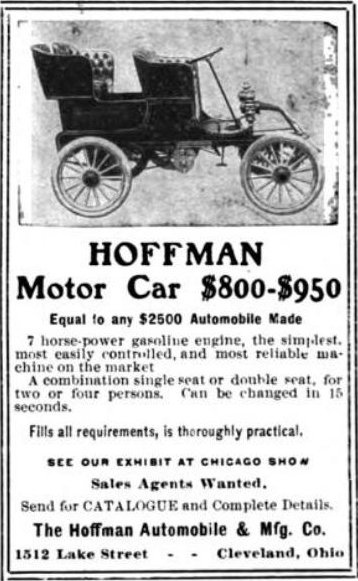

The Hoffman Automobile and Manufacturing Company was founded in 1900 by French immigrant Louis Hoffman and based in Cleveland, Ohio. The first cars went on sale in 1902. The original versions ran on steam, but the business eventually accepted the internal combustion engine. Hoffman departed the company in 1903.

It was later renamed the Royal Motor Company.

== Surviving examples ==
An open-top 1903 Hoffman is on display at the Crawford Auto-Aviation Museum. One of 100 Hoffmans made that year, it sported a single-cylinder gasoline engine and sold for $925 in 1903.
