= City of London School for Girls =

Private school in London, England

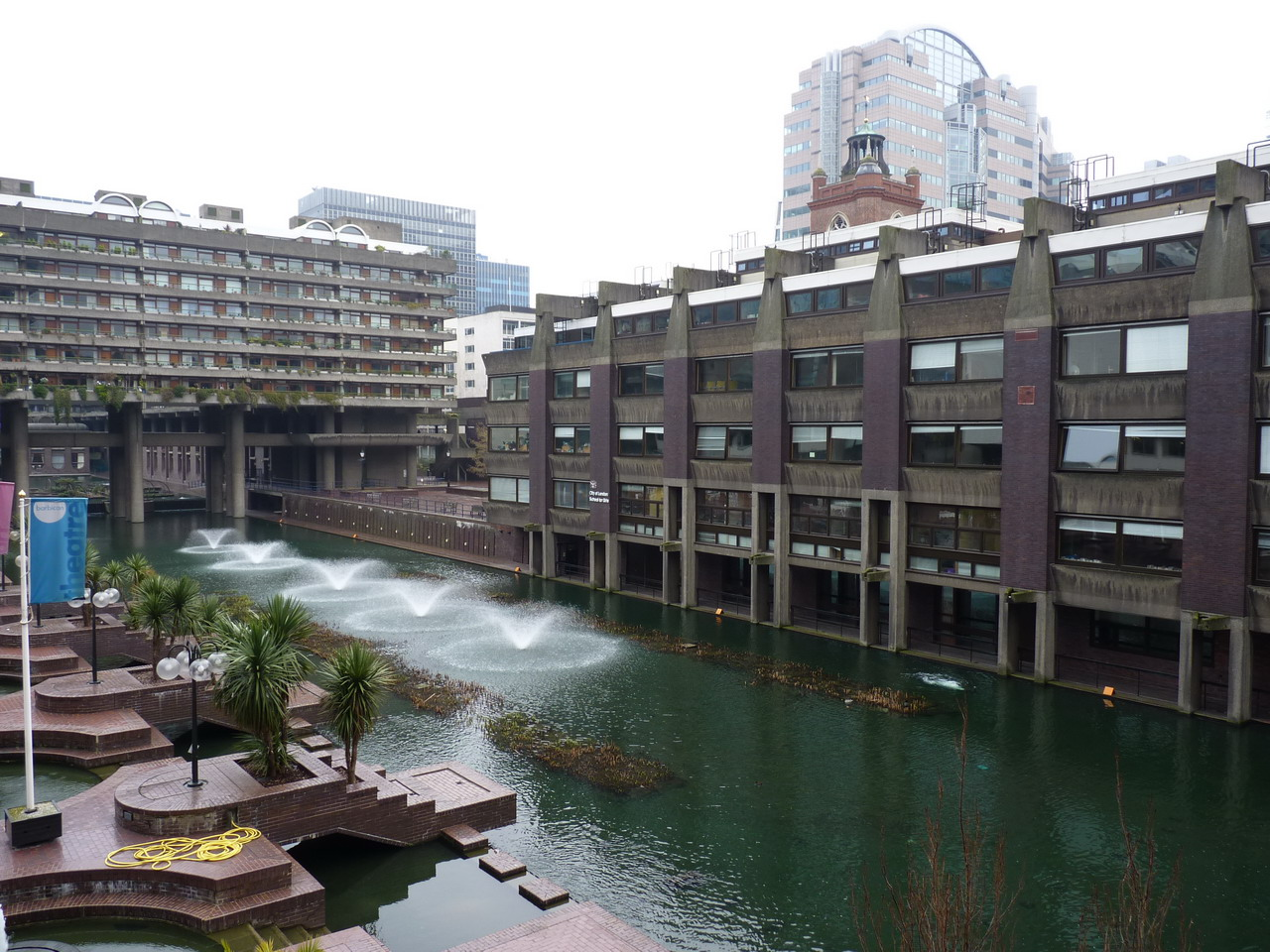
- The School, seen on the right, facing the waterway and fountains of the Barbican Centre

Location
- Barbican; London, EC2; United Kingdom; 51°31′09″N 00°05′40″W

Information
- Type: Private day school
- Motto: Latin: Domine Dirige Nos (O Lord Direct us)
- Established: 1894
- Founder: William Ward
- Local authority: City of London
- Department for Education URN: 100001 Tables
- Headmistress: Jenny Brown
- Gender: Girls
- Age: 10 to 18
- Enrolment: 707
- Houses: Fleet, Tudor, St. Bride & Ward
- Colour: Red
- Alumnae: City of London Old Girls
- Website: clsg.org.uk

The City of London School for Girls (CLSG) is a private school adjacent to the Barbican Centre, part of the Barbican Estate, in the City of London. It is the partner school of the all-boys City of London School and the City of London Freemen's School. All three schools receive funding from the City's Cash. It is a member of the Headmasters' and Headmistresses' Conference (HMC) and the Girls' Schools Association.

== History ==
The school was founded using a bequest by William Ward, a merchant of Brixton, in 1881 and opened in Carmelite Street in 1894. It was his conviction that girls should be given a broad and liberal education with an emphasis on scholarship; he left a third of his fortune to the City of London to fund the foundation of a girls' school. The school is still administered by the Corporation of London, and the Board of Governors is appointed by the Court of Common Council. The school also receives financial support from the City Livery Companies as well as banks and other City firms. The school has strong links with the all-boys City of London School, 15 minutes' walk away, which likewise is run by the Corporation.

The school moved to new buildings in the Barbican Estate in 1969.

== General ==
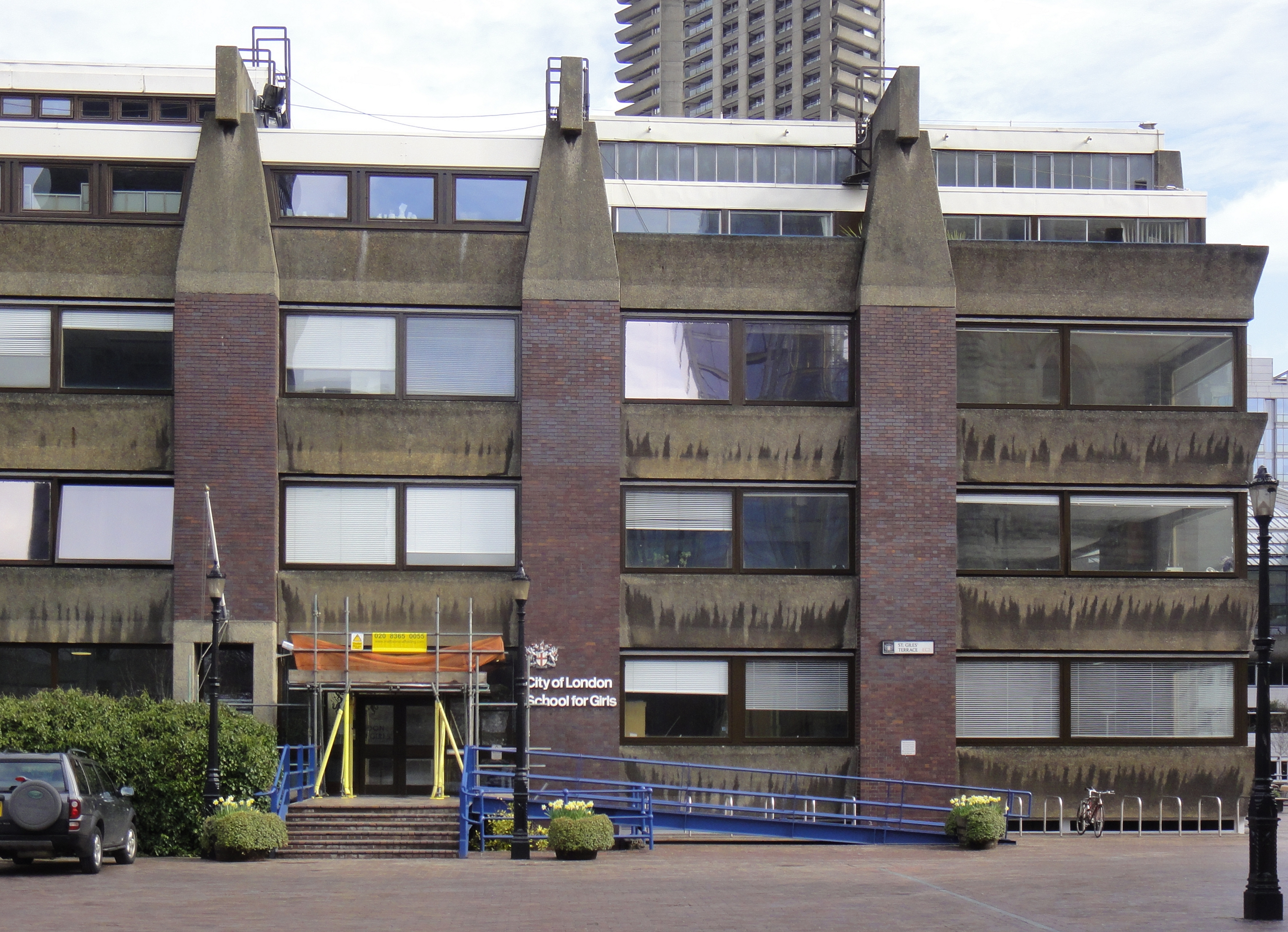
City of London School for Girls

In 2018, it was rated by The Sunday Times as the second-best independent school in the UK, based on GCSE and A-Level results. It has previously topped The Times A-level league table of England's independent schools and its table of prep schools. It has contributed two female participants to UK International Mathematical Olympiad teams.

The Good Schools Guide describes City as having a "famously diverse mix of pupils and staff as befits the school's situation in the heart of the city". The school previously had a small prep school, but this was dissolved in 2022 to form part of the new City Junior School. The school admits some students at 16.

Fees are currently £7,926 per term for the senior school exclusive of school lunches, and entrance is by examination. Approximately 25% of students receive bursary assistance of some kind, including full bursaries.

The school is secular, yet has mildly Christian traditions, with an optional annual Carol Service in the neighbouring St Giles' Church. There is a Jewish Society as well as an Asian Society, an Oriental Society and an African-Caribbean Society.

City has a house system which consists of four houses. The four houses are Fleet (after Fleet Street), Tudor (after Tudor Street), St. Bride (after St. Bride church on Fleet Street), Ward (after William Ward, the founder of the school). There are a variety of inter-house competitions, including Drama, Debating, Maths, Art, Music, the Inter-House Quiz and at Sports Day, as well as several other sports competitions throughout the year.

There have been 12 headmistresses of the school; as of April 2024 the headmistress is Jenny Brown.

== Extracurricular ==
The school is next to the Barbican Arts Centre and the Guildhall School of Music and Drama, and has a focus on the arts. The school offers joint music scholarships with the Guildhall Music School. Since 2005, the school has held a drama festival called Moat Fest.

The school has a swimming pool, a lecture theatre, two netball/tennis courts, a drama studio, an all weather playing field and an indoor gym with climbing wall, as well as a gym complete with exercise equipment such as treadmills and weights. The school has several times won the national European Youth Parliament competition and has a debating programme.

It is the only school to have won the international Kids' Lit Quiz twice, in 2010 and 2014.

== Buildings ==
The school is situated in a Grade II listed building in the Barbican.

The school has attracted controversy with recent expansion plans. In January 2018 plans were advanced to expand prep school for four- to seven-year-olds in an underground car park of an adjoining tower block, Thomas More House. The plans met with significant local opposition. A further plan for expansion was prepared by Nicholas Hare Architects, again meeting with strong opposition, and was subsequently abandoned.

== Head Mistresses ==
- 1894–1910 Alice Blagrave
- 1910–1927 Ethel Strudwick
- 1927–1932 Hilda Doris Bugby (died in office)
- 1932–1937 Julia Elizabeth Turner
- 1937–1949 E. D. M. Winters
- 1949–1972 Gladys Colton (1909–1986)
- 1972–1986: Lily M. Mackie
- 1986–1995: Lady Valerie France
- 1995–2007: Yvonne Burne
- 2007–2014: Diana Vernon
- 2014–2019: Ena Harrop
- 2019–present: Jenny Brown

== Notable alumnae ==
For a fuller list, see Category:People educated at the City of London School for Girls

- Wilhelmina Hay Abbott, suffragist
- Dido Armstrong, singer
- Anna Blundy, journalist
- Margaret Boden, scientist
- Fiona Caldicott, psychiatrist and psychotherapist, Principal of Somerville College, Oxford
- Hilary Cass, president of the Royal College of Paediatrics and Child Health
- Daisy Christodoulou, educationalist
- Jean Dawnay, fashion model
- Elizabeth Emanuel, fashion designer
- Romola Garai, actress
- Grace Golden, artist
- Florence Harmer, historian
- Sarah B. Hart, mathematician, first female Gresham Professor of Geometry
- Sahar Hashemi, entrepreneur
- Tin-Tin Ho, table tennis player
- Phyllis Margaret Tookey Kerridge, scientist
- Hermione Lee, professor of English at the University of Oxford, President of Wolfson College, Oxford
- Megan Lloyd George, politician
- Tasmin Lucia Khan, ITV news presenter
- Georgina Mace DBE FRS, Conservation scientist
- Sara Nathan, journalist
- Mary Nighy, actress
- Melinda Camber Porter, artist, journalist, & filmmaker
- Ella Purnell, actress
- Claire Rayner, journalist
- Dinah Rose, barrister, President of Magdalen College, Oxford
- Dorothy Spiers, first female actuary in the UK
- Margaret Stacey, sociologist
- Tabby Stoecker, Olympic gold medallist in skeleton
- Olivia Sudjic, novelist
- Margaret Turner-Warwick, first female president of the Royal College of Physicians
- Alison Weir, historian, writer
- Claudia Winkleman, television presenter
- Sophie Winkleman, actress
