= Beattie Casely-Hayford =

Ghanaian engineer, entrepreneur and media expert (1922–1989)

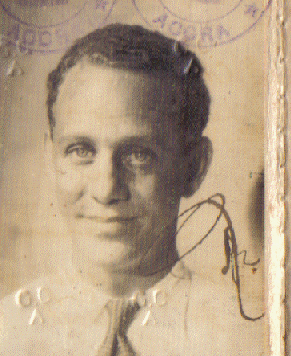
- Born: June 1922; Sekondi, Gold Coast
- Died: 6 August 1989 (aged 67)
- Occupations: Engineer, entrepreneur, broadcasting and media expert
- Parent: Archibald Casely-Hayford
- Relatives: J. E. Casely Hayford (grandfather); Louis Casely-Hayford (brother); Gus Casely-Hayford (nephew)

Beattie Casely-Hayford (June 1922 – 6 August 1989) was a Ghanaian engineer. He was the first director of the Ghana Arts Council, a co-founder of the Ghana National Dance Ensemble, and a director of the Ghana Broadcasting Corporation (GBC).

== Family ==
Beattie Casely-Hayford was the eldest son of Essie and Archibald Casely-Hayford, a lawyer, Gold Coast nationalist and former Minister of Agriculture and Natural Resources in Ghana's First Republic.

His brother was Louis Casely-Hayford, an engineer and former CEO of Volta River Authority in Ghana.

Casely-Hayford was a member of the prominent Casely-Hayford family; his grandparents were Beatrice Madelene (née Pinnock) and Joseph Ephraim Casely Hayford, a Gold Coast lawyer, author, journalist, educator, politician and Pan-Africanist.

== Early years ==
Casely-Hayford was born in Sekondi, Ghana, which was then the Gold Coast, and educated at Forrest Hill House School and Dulwich College, England. His education in England was interrupted when he returned to the Gold Coast at the onset of World War II.

Casely-Hayford was self-employed at this time. He extracted coconut oil to make soap and ran two garages that repaired and spray-painted cars.

== Career ==
Casely-Hayford trained for a year in England as a Totalisator Technician for the Kumasi Race Course; and worked at the Kumasi Institute of Technology (present-day Kwame Nkrumah University of Science and Technology) as the Maintenance Officer. Later, he served as the Director and Operations Manager for Ghana Poultry Farm, Nungua; Director of the Arts Council of Ghana; Director of Ghana Broadcasting Corporation's Television division (GBC TV); Technical Director of Modern Signs; and then finally settled into private business.

He owned and operated Caselyco Sound Studio, Signals and Controllers, Intek Engineering, and finally Televid Video and Audio.

== Ghana Arts Council ==
Casely-Hayford's interests included art and science. Ghana's former Prime Minister Dr. Kwame Nkrumah asked Nana Kobina Nketsiah to have Casely-Hayford start up the Arts Council of Ghana after the British relinquished the then Roger Club, an elite social club that was located on Accra's Atlantic coast.

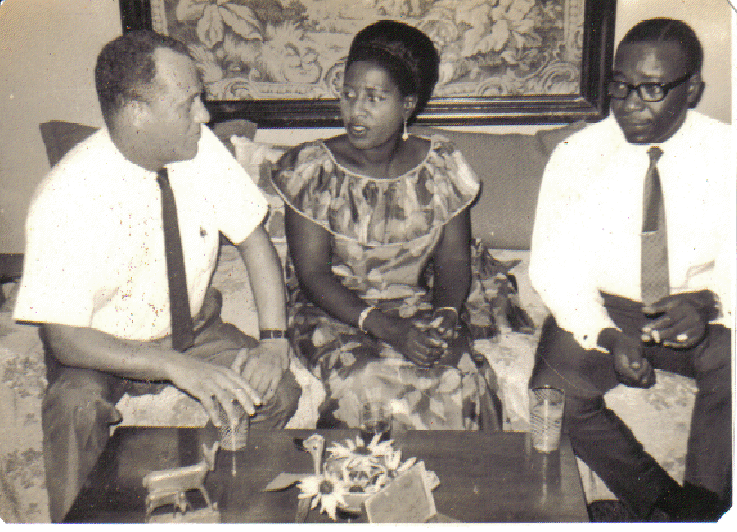
Casely-Hayford with Sylvia George and friend at a party in Accra

Casely-Hayford became the first director of the Ghana Arts Council. He was responsible for bringing to the fore the early concert party groups and plays. He also had the British Council sponsor drama performances and movies of Shakespeare plays. He collaborated with the artist and musician Saka Acquaye, who succeeded him as the director of the Ghana Arts Council.

Saka Acquaye's plays were featured at the Accra Arts Centre, including his most important and popular musical, The Lost Fisherman. The original Wulomei – a traditional folk music group that Saka Acquaye managed – was introduced to a national audience at the Accra Arts Centre.

Master drummer, percussionist and musician Guy Warren (Kofi Ghanaba) was prominently featured on several weekends. The classical musician Victor Gbeho also had the National Orchestra rehearsing and performing at the Accra Arts Centre. Many foreign cultural exchange shows were also put on at the Accra Arts Centre. For instance, troupes from Russia and from China performed, the Chinese troupe singing a song in Twi, the local Ghanaian language.

== Louis Armstrong and other American performers ==
Casely-Hayford was instrumental in the arrangements during the 1956 visit of Louis Armstrong, with his wife Lucille, and band to Ghana. Casely-Hayford helped to arrange a durbar at Achimota School, where Louis and Lucille Armstrong and the band members were entertained by Ghanaian cultural dancers and musicians.

The US Information Service ("USIS") often sent performers to Ghana as part of a cultural relations programme. The jazz guitarist Charlie Byrd performed in one such show, and ended the show with a rendition of one of Jimi Hendrix's songs, "Hey Joe". Cozy Cole was another such performer.

A noted American resident in Ghana, dentist Robert Lee, who had relocated with his family to Accra from the US in 1956, taught voice and was also often on stage.

== Cultural shows and pop competitions ==
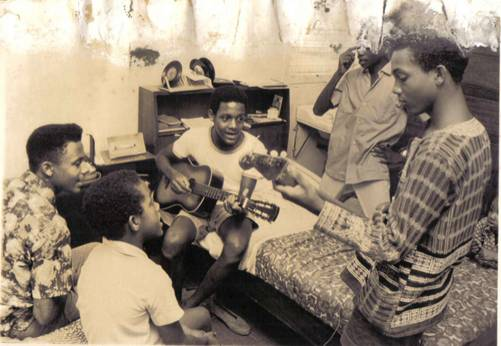
The Casely-Hayford boys playing guitar at Kanda

Casely-Hayford collaborated with Prof. Mawure Bertie Opoku of the Institute of African Studies at the University of Ghana, Legon, and together they established the Ghana National Dance Ensemble.

In the early 1960s, Casely-Hayford introduced the Do Show, a talent show that was open to all through auditions. One of the products of the Do Show is the Paris-based singer Bibie Brew.

The Ghanaian teens of the 1960s also had their chance and several pop music competitions were held at the Arts Centre. Casely-Hayford's five sons all played guitar in their teens. His oldest son, Ralph, a bassist, and a nephew, Roy, played in one of Ghana's professional pop bands, "The Saints", and they performed at the Accra Arts Centre.

== Broadcasting and puppetry ==
Casely-Hayford developed and promoted the craft of puppetry. In addition to puppet showsat the Arts Centre, he also had the puppetry team visit schools to give performances.

He was transferred to the Ghana Broadcasting Corporation (GBC) as the Cultural Liaison Officer under Shirley Du Bois. Eventually, he was appointed Director of GBC. One of the things he developed for GBC TV News (now GTV News) was the rotating globe that was used for years until computer graphics took over.

He also introduced puppet shows on GBC TV, some of them based on the popular traditional concert party theatre format.

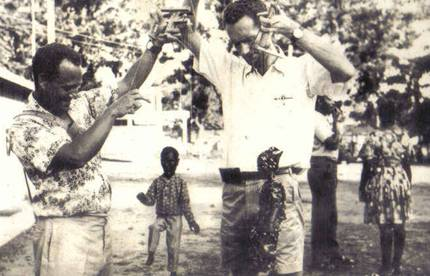
Casely-Hayford demonstrates puppets, 1968

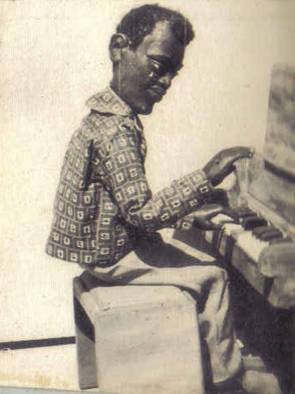
1968 GBC puppet show, developed by Casely-Hayford

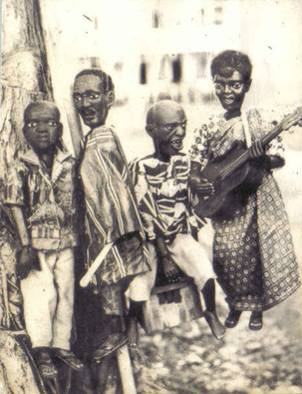
1968 GBC puppet show, developed by Casely-Hayford

== Music and literary work ==
Casely-Hayford was an active member of the Ghana Writers Guild and did a lot of work with the renowned poet and writer Atukwei Okai. Casely-Hayford was also a jazz pianist. His father, Archie, was a pianist and a composer and his mother, Essie, also played piano and loved to sing and perform.

The traditional guitarist Koo Nimo had a lasting relationship with Casely-Hayford and shared many recording hours in later years. Casely-Hayford gave several lectures on Ghana's highlife music; collaborated with the University of Ghana Music Professor John Collins; and served as a founding patron of Bokoor African Popular Music Archives Foundation, an NGO that Prof. Collins established in 1990, soon after Casely-Hayford's death in 1989.

== Engineering work ==
Casely-Hayford's true passion lay in manufacturing and engineering. Everywhere he lived with his family, he kept his cars outside the garage because he used the garage as an engineering workshop. He involved his five sons in his engineering work and projects.

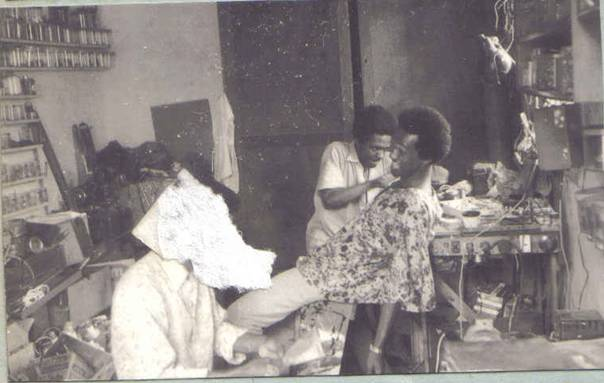
Garage Workshop, Kanda, Pinnock and Sydney Casely-Hayford, 1971

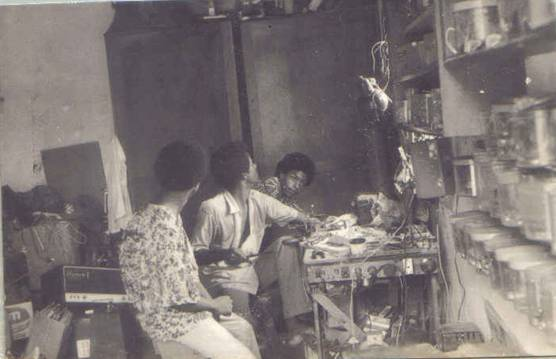
Garage Workshop, Kanda, Pinnock and Sydney, 1971

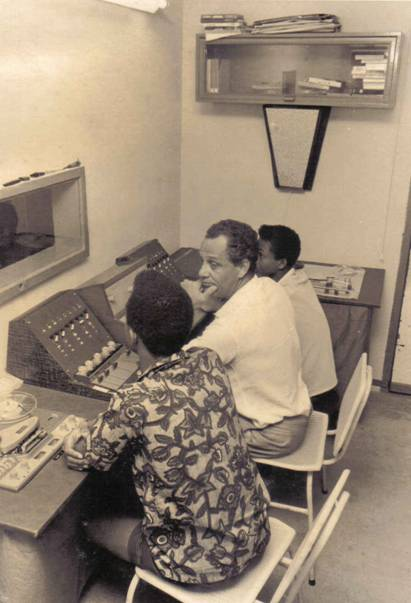
Casely-Hayford in his Caselyco Studio with sons Leo and Sydney

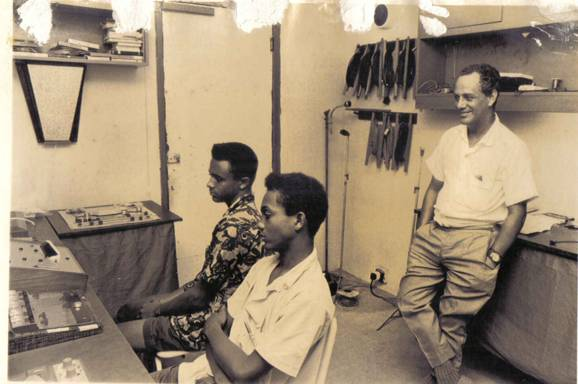
Casely-Hayford in his Caselyco Studio with sons Leo and Sydney

== Alternative energy ==
Casely-Hayford believed that the solution to Ghana's persistent energy problems lay in alternative energy. The last project he undertook before his death in 1989 was the installation of alternative energy windmills at Weija, in the western part of the Greater Accra Region.

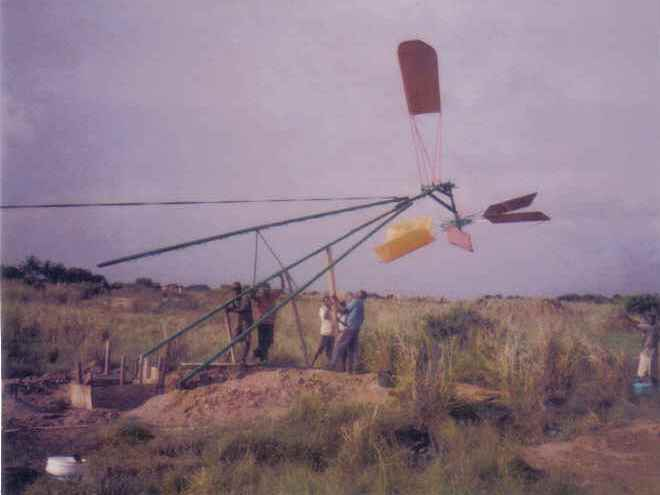
Windpump hoisting, Weija

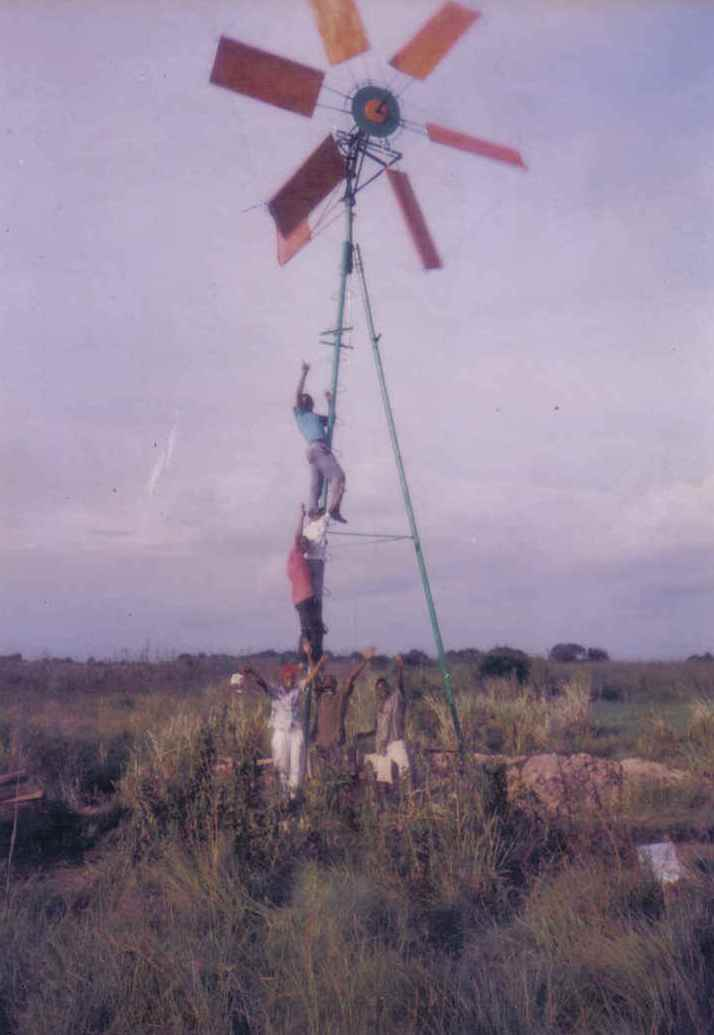
Windpump up and released, Weija

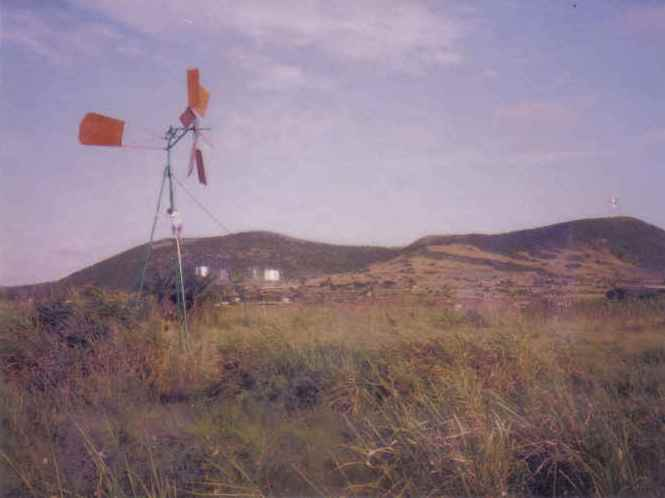
Windpump up and running, Weija

Wind Corpus Savonius, Accra

His son Pinnock Casely-Hayford, an engineer who worked closely with him, has continued his work in the alternative energy sector, through his company "Breeze and Windy".

== Social work ==
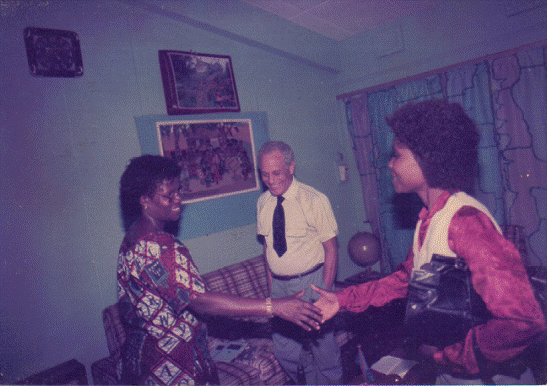
Casely-Hayford and Agatha Nketsiah deliver a Peace message to government official Aanaa Enin, 1986

From 1986 to 1989, Beattie Casely-Hayford worked with his son Pinnock Casely-Hayford to film the first HIV/AIDS patient at Korle-Bu Teaching Hospital's Fevers Ward that was operated by Dr. Neequaye. Later, Casely-Hayford collaborated with Professor Kwashi Quartey and Dr. Cecilia Bentsi as they visited and treated many AIDS victims. They travelled as far as Somanya and documented their visits on video.

== Final years ==
Casely-Hayford was a member of the Bahá'í Faith from 1973. In 1986, he led a Bahá'í delegation to deliver a Peace message to the Ghana government then led by Flt. Lt. Jerry Rawlings.

Casely-Hayford died in his sleep early on the morning of Sunday, 6 August 1989, at 67 years of age.
