= Charlie Casely-Hayford =

British fashion designer

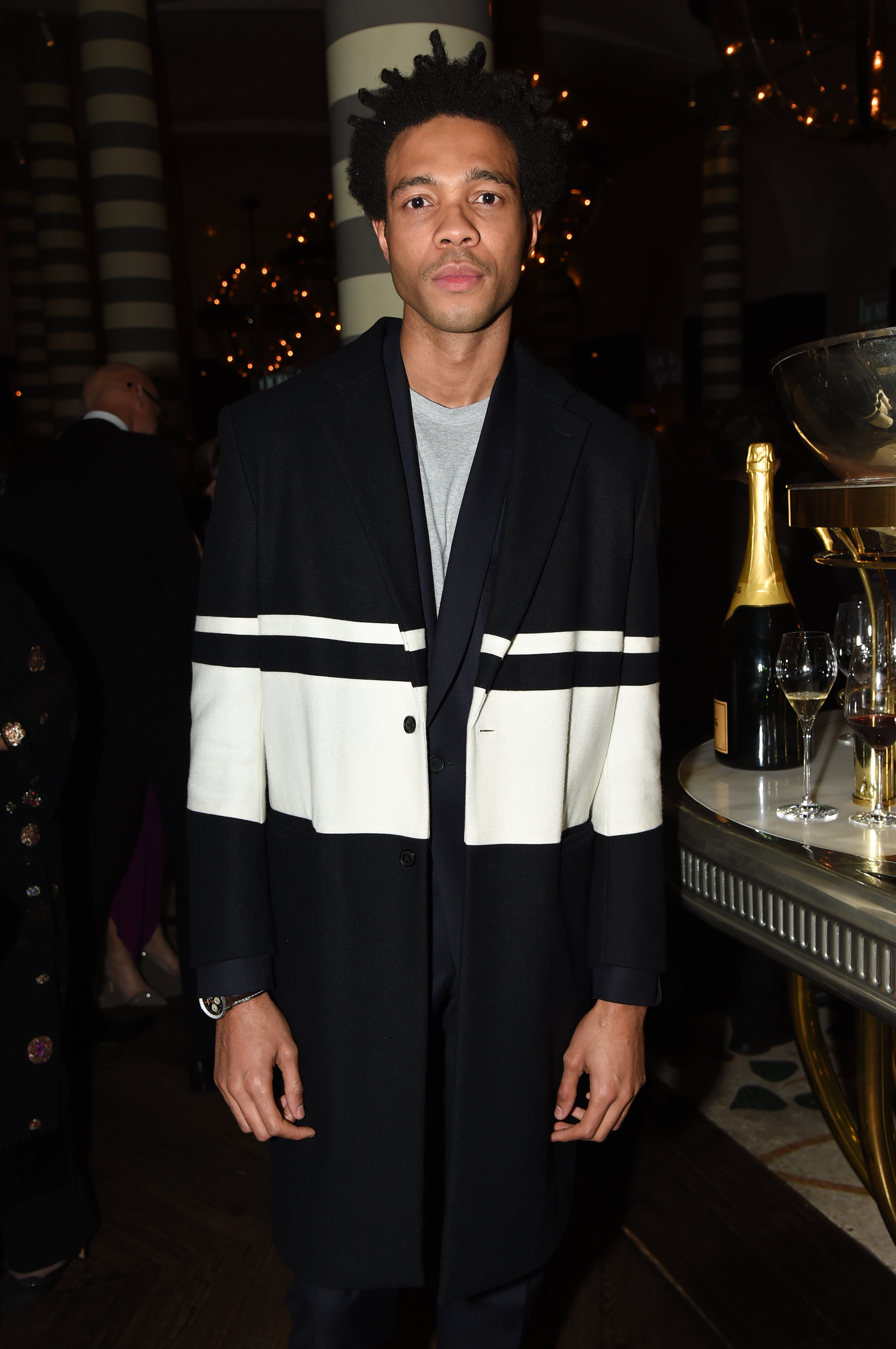
- Charlie Casely-Hayford at 20th-anniversary party for How to Spend It at Corinthia Hotel, London, 25 November 2014
- Born: 24 May 1986; London, England
- Education: Harrow School; Central St. Martins College of Art and Design; Courtauld Institute of Art
- Occupation: Menswear designer
- Spouse: Sophie Ashby
- Parent: Joe Casely-Hayford (father)
- Relatives: J. E. Casely Hayford (great-grandfather); Gus Casely-Hayford (uncle), Margaret Casely-Hayford (aunt)
- Website: casely-hayford.com

Charlie Casely-Hayford (born 24 May 1986) is a menswear designer based in London, England, where he was born. He founded the international menswear brand Casely-Hayford at the age of 22 with his father, the acclaimed British fashion designer Joe Casely-Hayford OBE.

== Early life and family ==
Charlie Casely-Hayford is the great-grandson of the respected politician and writer J. E. Casely Hayford MBE. The cultural historian Gus Casely-Hayford OBE is his uncle and the lawyer, businesswoman and public figure Margaret Casely-Hayford CBE is his aunt. In 2008 The Black Power List named the Casely-Hayford family the most influential black family in the UK.

=== Education ===
After leaving Harrow School, while studying at Central St. Martins College of Art and Design, Casely-Hayford began to contribute to a number of styling projects internationally. He has styled musicians varying from hip-hop artist Nas to UK band The xx and Grammy-award-winning artist Sam Smith. He has contributed to international publications, from GQ Style to i-D magazine.

== Career ==
In 2008, while studying for a degree in History of Art at the Courtauld Institute, Casely-Hayford joined his father to launch luxury menswear label Casely-Hayford, a brand based on English Sartorialism and British Anarchy. Casely-Hayford currently works between London and Tokyo where the collections are produced; they focus on the idea of duality as a foundation for the brand's ethos. International stockists include Dover Street Market, Colette, Corso Como, Barneys, I.T. Hong Kong and Isetan.

== Other work ==
In 2010, Casely-Hayford was made the global face of Converse's international ad campaign, which celebrates the 50th anniversary of the Jack Purcell Trainer. In 2008/2009 he modelled alongside Coco Sumner as the face of Dr. Martens.

In June 2010, Casely-Hayford was selected by Esquire Magazine as a "Brilliant Brit" in their prediction of 75 young talents shaping 2010. He was also selected to feature in i-D magazine's 100 most important portraits in fashion, shot by Nick Knight.

In June 2011, Premier Model Management signed up Casely-Hayford as the newest addition to their Special Bookings board.

He was named one of GQ's 50 best dressed men in Britain in 2013, 2014, and 2015. and one of the 40 best dressed men in the world by Esquire in 2017.

In 2015, he was named one of the most influential people under 40 by GQ magazine and one of the 25 people who matter most in Menswear by Style.com

In April 2017, Casely-Hayford collaborated with UK fashion brand Topman on a successful suiting collection titled Topman Fine Tailoring. The collection was sold through 30 stores in the UK and internationally.

== Personal life ==
Casely-Hayford is married to interior designer Sophie Ashby, founder of Studio Ashby.
