= Louis Casely-Hayford =

Ghanaian engineer (1936–2014)

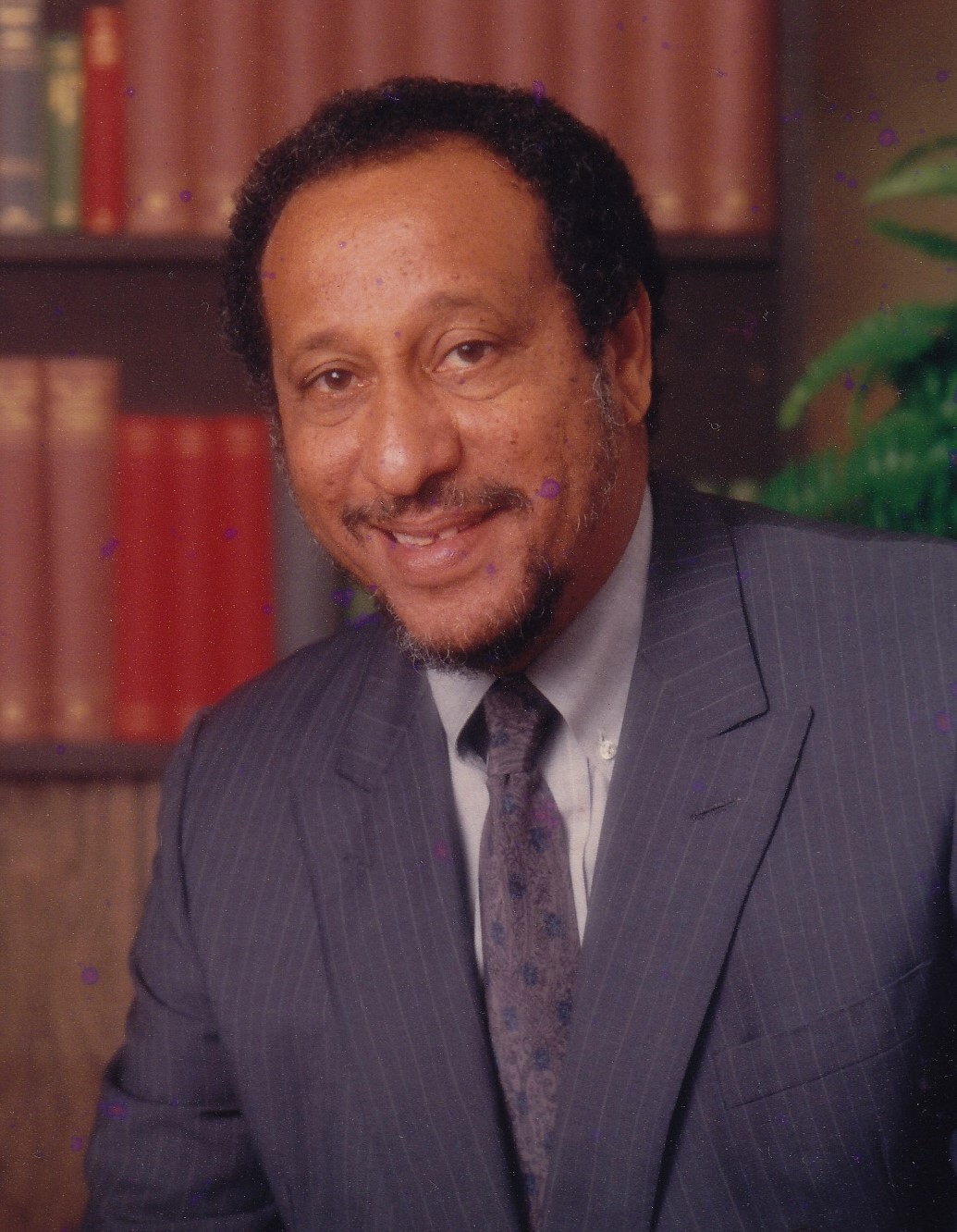

3rd CEO, Volta River Authority
- In office 1980–1991
- Preceded by: Dr Emmanuel L. Quartey
- Succeeded by: Erasmus Alexander Kwabla Kalitsi

Personal details
- Born: 13 July 1936 Takoradi, Gold Coast (present-day Ghana)
- Died: 24 November 2014 (aged 78) Ghana
- Parent(s): Archie Casely-Hayford and Essie Casely-Hayford
- Relatives: Joseph Ephraim Casely-Hayford (grandfather); Beattie Casely-Hayford (brother)
- Education: Adisadel College, 1948–52; Dulwich College, 1952–55; University of Manchester, 1956–69
- Occupation: Chartered engineer
- Awards: Honorary Doctorate, Kwame Nkrumah University of Science and Technology

Louis Casely-Hayford (13 July 1936 – 24 November 2014) was a Ghanaian chartered engineer who served as the third CEO of the Volta River Authority (VRA) from 1980 to 1991. He was CEO of the VRA when the master-plan for extension of electricity to the northern parts of Ghana was conceived. He led the creation of the VRA Training School, which trained engineers, technicians and other disciplines needed to support the power sector of Ghana. Casely-Hayford also played monumental roles as CEO in the development of Kpong Power Project.

== Early life ==
Louis Casely-Hayford was born in Takoradi, Gold Coast (now Ghana), on 13 July 1936 to Archie Casely-Hayford and Mrs Essie Casely-Hayford, and his siblings were Beattie Casely-Hayford and Desiree Casely-Hayford.

Louis was a descendant of a large and long lineage of extraordinary family members. His grandfather was Joseph Ephraim Casely-Hayford and his great-grandfather, the Reverend Joseph De-Graft Hayford, a Methodist minister, was an influential member of the Fante Confederacy of 1867. His grandfather, J. E. Casely Hayford, was one of the most celebrated Africans of his time, advocating the need for African countries to unite for their eventual emancipation – political, economic and social – which later found expression in the establishment of the Organisation of African Unity (OAU), now the African Union (AU).

Louis' grandfather was a family man who valued education and training of his children. As a result, Louis had 12 well educated uncles and aunts to look up to, in addition to his father Archie Casely-Hayford, who was a well-known barrister, a public figure and a consummate politician, the most famous of the Casely-Hayfords up till then.

== Family ==
Louis was married to Fredericka Casely-Hayford (née Lutterodt) and had five children: Josephine Casely-Hayford, Louisa Casely Hayford, Dennis Casely Hayford, Harold Casely Hayford and Sharon Casely Hayford.

== Education ==
Casely-Hayford attended Adisadel College, Cape Coast, from 1948 to 1952 and later went to Dulwich College, London, from 1952 to 1955. In October 1956, he entered the University of Manchester's Faculty of Technology, where he obtained his Bachelor of Science in Technology (BSc Tech, Hons) degree in July 1959 and his Master of Science degree in 1960.

== Working life ==
On 25 October 1962, after returning to Ghana, Casely-Hayford joined the Volta River Authority (VRA) as a Mechanical Engineer. His brilliance and tenacity of purpose propelled him through the ranks, from Mechanical Maintenance Engineer in 1964, Supervising Mechanical Maintenance Engineer in 1969, Acting Assistant Director of Power Operations in 1971 and confirmed assistant director of Power Operations (Generating and Plant Maintenance) in 1972. In 1974, he was appointed acting Director of Engineering and confirmed as Director of Engineering in 1975.

In 1977, he was appointed acting Deputy Chief Executive and confirmed the same year as Deputy Chief Executive. On 22 June 1980, he was appointed Chief Executive of the Volta River Authority. After a long and productive service, he retired from the VRA on 31 December 1990. He continued to serve the nation in various capacities until his transition.

He accumulated a lot of knowledge and experience by travelling to many power installations worldwide, including visits to the Hitachi Works in Japan in 1969 and the Snowy Mountains Engineering Corporation in Australia in 1976 to review the draft feasibility study report on the Bui Hydro Electric Project. He was on attachment to Ontario Hydro, Canada, in 1964 and again in 1978, where he participated in the Final Report of the Power Equipment Review Board of the Volta River Authority.

He also travelled on various assignments to Belgium, Benin, France, Great Britain, Italy, Kenya, Kuwait, Nigeria, Saudi Arabia, Sudan, Switzerland.

=== Volta River Authority ===
It is generally acknowledged that even though Louis was the third Chief Executive of the VRA after Mr Frank Dobson and Dr E. L. Quartey, he was the first staff member to have risen through the ranks to become the Chief Executive of the institution.

Casely-Hayford's distinct contributions to VRA and therefore, of Ghana's development process were numerous. He believed in the vision of beneficial sub-regional cooperation in West Africa and played a pivotal role in the realisation of the Ghana-Togo-Benin power interconnection project and the interconnection of the Ghana-Côte d'Ivoire electrical systems.

As chief executive officer of the VRA, he focused on man-power and leadership development. He created the VRA Training School that trained engineers, technicians and other disciplines needed to support the power sector. Casely-Hayford was the brain behind the extension of power to the Northern sector of the country and the transformation of Akosombo Township.

Casely-Hayford travelled extensively to canvass support and financing for the construction of a second hydroelectric project in Ghana. And having secured the funds, he oversaw the construction of the Kpong Generating Station and associated irrigation system.

His work with the VRA would result in the extension of power to the Northern sector of Ghana despite various challenges facing the country's Northern Region and would enable additional national electrification.

== Technological knowledge ==
As Chief Executive, Casely-Hayford oversaw the modernisation of the VRA's materials-management and information-technology systems, including the acquisition of computer equipment used to produce the authority's first newsletter.

The vision of the better future that Louis dreamt of was not limited to technical matters. He saw it as morally unacceptable for the large families of junior staff to be living in single-room accommodation called "2-in-1" while the predominantly small families of senior staff lived in three-room houses. He, therefore, introduced a policy in VRA for the provision of three-bedroom houses for all staff.

He was also disturbed by the squalid conditions of those who lived in the unplanned slum area, called "combine", which had developed at the entrance to Akosombo. Hence, when he became Chief Executive of VRA, he saw to their relocation and resettlement and therefore, achieved his vision of a future Akosombo with everyone in decent housing.

Beyond the VRA world, his sense of corporate social responsibility was exemplified by his inputs to the development of the Medical Services and the Akosombo International School, among other initiatives.

A chartered engineer, Casely-Hayford also held the qualifications of Associate of the Manchester College of Science and Technology (AMCST), Member of the Institute of Mechanical Engineers (M.I. Mech. E) and Fellow of the Ghana Institute of Engineers (F.Gh.1. E.).

== Other capacities ==
In addition to his role at the VRA, Casely-Hayford served the nation in various capacities such as a member of the Government Technical Advisory Committee on Energy (1979), the Ghana Tourist Development Company, Government Committee for the renegotiation of the Volta Master Agreement and simultaneously the National Energy Board (1985–89). He was also Chairman on several Committees such as the Technical Audit Committee into Public Corporations (1981) and the Special Committee appointed by Government to recommend the reorganisation of the Petroleum Industry in Ghana (1987).

He was one of the prominent Ghanaians who took the idea of mentoring younger colleagues very seriously. In fact, there are quite a lot of Ghanaians currently holding important positions both in the private and public sectors who considered Louis as their main mentor. He was a philanthropist who was especially compassionate to the poor and the needy in and around his local community.

Casely-Hayford was a former chairman of the Kwame Nkrumah University of Science and Technology governing council. He also served in the capacity of chairman of the tertiary board of education of Ghana.

== Honours ==
In recognition of his various contributions to Ghana, he was presented with a Certificate of Honour in 1987 on the occasion of the 50th Year Reign of Odeneho Kwafo Akoto II, KMC. Louis was elevated to the position of Barima in recognition of his selfless and dedicated service to the Akwamu Traditional Area. In 2003, he was awarded a Doctorate of Science (DSc) Honoris Causa by the Kwame Nkrumah University of Science and Technology. The accompanying citation described him as a patriot, scholar, management consultant and engineer par excellence.

In 2011, the VRA presented him with an Award of Merit on the occasion of the 50th Anniversary for his significant contribution to the implementation of the Akosombo Project and operation of the Power facilities.

== Death ==
Casely-Hayford died on 24 November 2014. A remembrance service was held for him by the VRA.
