= Casely-Hayford =

Surname list

Casely-Hayford is an English language patronymic surname that is native to Ghana. It is most commonly borne by the Casely-Hayford family, descendants of the 19th century Euro-Fante and Pan-Africanist, J. E. Casely Hayford of Cape Coast. The family is one of Ghana's most prominent families, and in recent times, its members have also risen to positions of influence in the Black British elite. In 2008, the Casely-Hayfords were named on "The Black Powerlist" as the most influential black family in the UK.

== Origin of the surname ==
The surname was originally simply Hayford. Archie Casely-Hayford was the first member of his family – a cadet branch of the royal dynasty of Cape Coast – to use the compound name, adding one of his forenames to the original to form Casely-Hayford.

== Notable members of the family ==
The Casely-Hayfords have been prominent in the law, politics, the arts, and academia. Notable members include:

- Joseph de Graft Hayford (1840–1919), Wesleyan Methodist minister on the Gold Coast
- Ernest James Hayford (1858–1913), second African on the Gold Coast to become a physician and later a lawyer on the Gold Coast
- Joseph Ephraim Casely Hayford, MBE, (1866–1930) was a Gold Coast journalist, editor, author, lawyer, educator and Pan-Africanist politician
- Adelaide Casely-Hayford, MBE née Smith (1868–1960), was a Sierra Leone Creole advocate, cultural nationalism activist, educator, school founder, short-story writer, and feminist
- Archie Casely-Hayford (1897–1977), Ghanaian barrister and nationalist politician in the Gold Coast, municipal member for Kumasi and Minister of Agriculture and Natural Resources during the First Republic
- Gladys May Casely-Hayford (1904–1950), Gold Coast-born Sierra Leonean writer and pioneer of Krio language literature
- Beattie Casely-Hayford (1922–1989), Ghanaian engineer, the first Director of the Ghana Arts Council, a co-founder of the Ghana National Dance Ensemble, and Director of the Ghana Broadcasting Corporation (GBC)
- Louis Casely-Hayford (1936–2014), Ghanaian engineer and CEO of Volta River Authority
- Joe Casely-Hayford, OBE (1956–2019), British fashion designer
- Margaret Casely-Hayford (born 1959), British lawyer, chair of ActionAid UK
- Gus Casely-Hayford, OBE (born 1964), British curator and cultural historian
- Charlie Casely-Hayford (born 1986), British fashion designer

== See also ==
- Bartels (Ghanaian family)
- Ofori-Atta
