= Joe Casely-Hayford =

British fashion designer (1956–2010)

Joe Casely-Hayford OBE
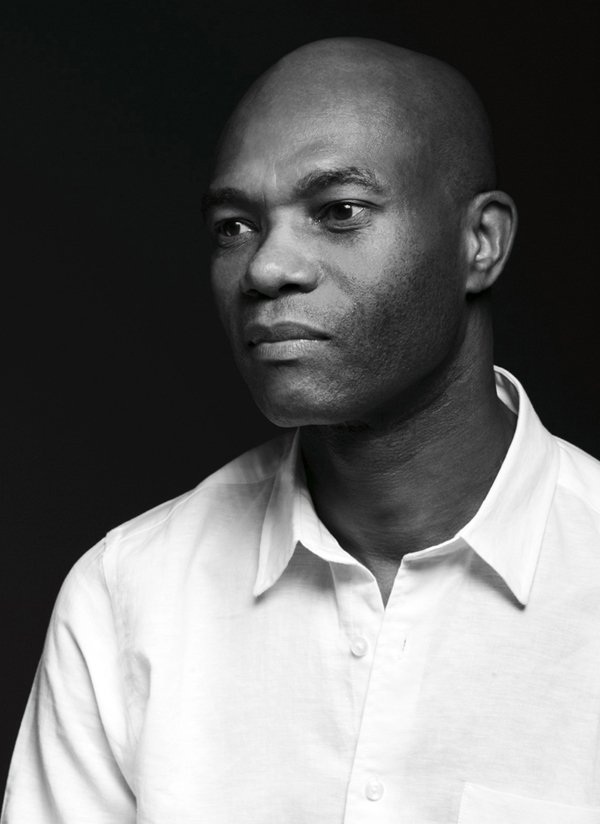
- Casely-Hayford in 2008
- Born: Joseph Ephraim Casely-Hayford; 24 May 1956; Kent, England
- Died: 3 January 2019 (aged 62)
- Education: Saint Martin's School of Art; Institute of Contemporary Arts
- Occupation: Fashion designer
- Spouse: Maria Stevens (m.1980)
- Children: Alice Casely-Hayford; Charlie Casely-Hayford
- Relatives: J. E. Casely Hayford (grandfather); Gus Casely-Hayford (brother), Margaret Casely-Hayford (sister)

Joseph Ephraim Casely-Hayford OBE (24 May 1956 – 3 January 2019) was a British fashion designer. Beginning in the mid-1980s he established an international reputation as one of the UK's most respected and consistently relevant designers of men's and womenswear clothing. He was appointed an Officer of the Order of the British Empire, for services to the fashion industry, in the 2007 Birthday Honours.

== Personal life ==
In 1976 Casely-Hayford met Maria Stevens at Saint Martin's School of Art. They married in 1980, and were life and business partners until his death in early 2019.

In 2008 The Black Power List named the Casely-Hayford family the most influential black family in the UK. In 2006 his sister, Dr Margaret Casely-Hayford CBE, became the General Counsel, Director of Legal Services at The Waitrose – John Lewis Partnership, a company with 70,000 employees. In 2014 she was appointed chair of ActionAid UK. In July 2017 she was named Chancellor of Coventry University. In February 2018 she was announced as The chair of the board of Shakespeare's Globe, taking over from Lord Bichard. He was the brother of cultural historian and director of the Smithsonian Institution's National Museum of African Art, Dr Gus Casely-Hayford OBE, and Peter Casely-Hayford, whose film company, Twenty Twenty has made some of the UK's most popular television programmes, such as The Choir, Brat Camp and First Dates. He was son of Victor Casely-Hayford, an accountant who had trained as a barrister, and was the grandson and namesake of the eminent lawyer and statesman J. E. Casely Hayford, MBE, whose 1911 novel Ethiopia Unbound was one of the first novels to be published in English by a black African, greatly influencing Pan-African politics and the leading civil rights activists of its time.

Joe Casely-Hayford had two children: Charlie Casely-Hayford, a designer and stylist, and Alice Casely-Hayford, the Digital Editor of British Vogue magazine.

On 3 January 2019, Joe Casely-Hayford died aged 62, following a three-year battle with cancer.

== Training and education ==
Casely-Hayford's formal training began at the Tailor and Cutter Academy in London (1974–75), where students were taught to draft and construct garments from scratch. He spent time in the workrooms of the celebrated Mount Street tailor Douglas Hayward before attending Saint Martin's School of Art in 1975. He then completed Diana Weir's History of Art course at the ICA, where he studied European art and history (1979–81).

== Career ==
Casely-Hayford began producing collections in 1983 under the label name KIT, selling to small specialist fashion stores in London such as Demob in Beak Street, Axiom and New Masters in the King's Road, Chelsea. His first collections were made from recycled WWII army tents that were taken apart and then cut into jackets, trousers, skirts and tops. After construction, these garments would be industrially washed, creating a worn and distressed appearance. This look was hugely successful; however, making clothes from used tents was labour-intensive. Casely-Hayford discovered R&J Partington mill in Manchester who were weaving incredibly robust cotton shirting. He began making shirts from this fabric. A shirt that opened at the front and back became an instant success and launched the Joe Casely-Hayford brand proper in 1984. Now selling to international designer stores such as Jones, Joseph and Crolla in London. also Susanne Bartsch, Charivari and Bloomingdale's in New York City.

Casely-Hayford was nominated for Womenswear British Designer of the Year in 1989, and also Innovative Designer of the Year in 1991. He also worked as a freelance creative director with Piero Panchetti in Italy, and wrote and styled pages for major publications including The Face, i-D, Arena Homme +, The Independent, How to Spend It and Senken Shimbun in Japan. In 1991, for Sock Shop, along with Vivienne Westwood, he designed a range of women's tights featuring the brands playing card motif and contributed clothes to the Derek Jarman film Edward II. In 1993 he was the first designer to be approached to create ranges exclusively for Topshop, and he also designed special collector's pieces for the Joseph label.

In 2002, he designed a limited edition T-shirt in collaboration with the Turner Prize-winning artist Chris Ofili. In 1995, as a departure from the nature of his previous commissions, Casely-Hayford undertook the design of the hugely successful and critically acclaimed exhibition The Art of African Textiles – Technology, Tradition, and Lurex at London's Barbican Centre museum. The exhibition was a major feature of the "Africa '95" programme in the United Kingdom. Casely-Hayford contributed definitive pieces of work to many fashion and art related exhibitions around the globe, as well as being the subject of exhibitions himself. "Through the Ages", a retrospective of his work, was held at "The Edge" space in Tokyo, September 1996.

Joe Casely-Hayford pieces are kept in permanent collections by the Victoria and Albert Museum, Fashion and Textile Museum in London, the Museum of London and the Museum at FIT Fashion Institute of Technology in New York City.

Casely-Hayford produced his own brand label for men and women continuously between the mid-1980s and 2005, and showed his collections on the runway in Paris, London and Tokyo. In addition, he undertook work for film, ballet, and bespoke commissions for bands and artists in the music industry, dressing many leading celebrities. His clientele included The Clash, Lou Reed, Liam Gallagher, Jarvis Cocker, Take That, Suede, Benedict Cumberbatch, and Michael Fassbender. Casely-Hayford designed the stage wardrobe for U2 from 1991 to 1993. This led to his having created seminal outfits for the band during their two-year world tour and for the albums Achtung Baby and Zooropa.

U2's Bono photographed wearing Joe Casely-Hayford was the first man to be featured on the cover of Vogue in December 1992. This cover was also selected as one of Alexandra Shulman's top 20 covers.

Casely-Hayford's signature style of original yet wearable clothing has been sold through more than 150 stores worldwide, the majority being in Japan. From 1993 to 2004, his collections were distributed through Look Inc., also the distributors for Marc Jacobs' Look. The collections have been sold in prestigious stores and select shops throughout Japan such as Beams; United Arrows; Edifice; History; Deuxième Classe; Tomorrowland; Robehouse; and Dressterior. International stockists have included Selfridges, Barneys, Liberty, b-Store and colette.

Casely-Hayford is featured in the book Fashion Now, which lists the 150 designers in the world considered most important to i-D, edited by Terry Jones, and published by Taschen in 2003. He is also included in the second edition, issued in 2005, called Fashion Now 2, and the third edition, Icons, published in 2006. In February 2007, Joe Casely-Hayford was named in the Independent newspaper as one of "The Fabulous Fifty" most influential fashion creatives in London.

Casely-Hayford worked in his own right on limited-edition collections for specialist stores in the Japanese market, which began with a capsule range in 2004 for B2nd menswear. He worked with Jun Co. Ltd on a menswear collaboration label with Adam et Ropé, using traditional Japanese artisan dyeing techniques combined with modern styling. The range was distributed through the leading Adam et Ropé stores across Japan. Following the launch of the Casely-Hayford collection in 2009, he designed an exclusive Sartorial collection for Barneys New York Japan.

In 2005, Joe Casely-Hayford became creative director of Gieves & Hawkes, the 200-year-old Savile Row house. In January 2006 the new Gieves collection was launched on the runway in Paris. Casely-Hayford was credited with bringing the 200-year-old house into the 21st century.

In 2008, he was approached to form a collaboration with Sir Terence Conran for the launch in London's Shoreditch area of a new boutique hotel, restaurant and deli called Albion (www.theboundary.co.uk). The first stage of the project opened it doors on 1 January 2009. Casely-Hayford was responsible for the creative direction of all the clothing throughout the development.

In Spring/Summer 2009, he launched a new luxury menswear brand called Casely-Hayford, in collaboration with his son Charlie Casely-Hayford. The brand philosophy reflects the Casely-Hayford spirit with duality at its core, combining "English heritage" with "British anarchy", Savile Row tailoring methods with modern-day sportswear. It is the first time in high fashion where both father and son actively partnered at the creative helm. The collection is sold through world leading specialist boutiques and department stores such as Selfridges, Dover Street Market, Harvey Nichols, Liberty (department store), United Arrows, and Barneys New York Japan. i-D magazine said of the launch of the collection: "The most accomplished debut London Collections: Men will ever see".

In June 2014, Joe Casely-Hayford was appointed a Visiting Fellow of the University of the Arts London.

In January 2015, Vogue magazine included Casely-Hayford in a list of the "25 people who matter the most in menswear right now". In 2016, The Financial Times magazine How to Spend It said that "few British menswear designers sell London to the world better than Joe and Charlie Casely-Hayford".
