= Lilian Charlesworth =

Headmistress and promoter of international understanding

- Born: 15 March 1897; Stockwell
- Died: 20 November 1970 (aged 73); City of Westminster
- Occupation: headteacher
- Known for: leading Sutton High School

Lilian Edith Charlesworth CBE (15 March 1897 – 20 November 1970) was a British headmistress of girls' schools and promoter of international understanding. She led Sutton High School in Greater London for twenty years and she was President of the Headmistresses Association.

== Life ==
Charlesworth was born in Stockwell in London in 1897. Her parents were Sarah Elizabeth (born Bragg) and Jonathan Charlesworth who was a teacher. She attended Streatham and Clapham High School which was run by the Girls' Day School Trust. In 1918 she graduated in "Classics" from Royal Holloway College, London. She went straight into teaching at Acton Boys' School and then in Clapham and then for two years she was at Roedean school in Brighton.

In 1931 she took her first headship leading the Kensington High School for the Girls' Day School Trust.

In 1939 she was appointed as the head of Sutton High School which was also a Girls' Day School Trust school.

From 1948 to 1950 when she was the President of the Headmistresses Association. In 1951 she was invited onto British television (the BBC) to discuss the education of girl's with the broadcaster E. Arnot Robertson and the documentary maker Jill Craigie.

In 1954 she became a Commander of the British Empire.

She retired in 1959 and the school named a building after her. In her retirement she took a mule and went walking in the Himalayas.

== International ==
She was sent to Paris three time to represent the UK at general conferences of UNESCO. Her contributions to the Council for Education in World Citizenship in particular were appreciated. In 1948 she went to look at the USA and five years later she was visiting the Gold Coast to see the important boarding-school Achimota which educated many post colonial leaders. Two years later she was in Sudan giving advise and learning. When she returned she told her school's pupils about UNESCO, politics, the importance of women's education and the Mahdi.

Charlesworth died in hospital in the City of Westminster in 1970.
