= Elizabeth Llewellyn =

Elizabeth Llewellyn MBE
- Born: Elizabeth Lorraine Davidson; 1973 or 1974 (age 52–53); South London, England
- Genres: Opera
- Occupation: Musician
- Instrument: Singing
- Years active: 2010–present
- Website: elizabethllewellyn.com

Elizabeth Lorraine Llewellyn MBE (née Davidson; born 1974) is an English opera singer who debuted with the English National Opera in 2010. She was named the "Best newcomer" in 2010 by The Daily Telegraph for her performance as Mimi in Giacomo Puccini's La bohème, and according to Mary Ann Sieghart of the BBC is "set to become one of the great stars of opera."

== Early life ==
The daughter of Jamaican parents, Llewellyn was born Elizabeth Davidson near Brixton, South London. and showed interest in music at an early age, playing both the piano and the violin as well as singing while attending Streatham and Clapham High School. Partly influenced by the recordings of opera great Jessye Norman, she chose to pursue singing, and gained a place at the Royal Northern College of Music in Manchester. Due to consistent illness which affected her voice, she stopped singing at twenty-two, and soon started work in recruitment and training at an information technology company.

== Opera career ==
Ten years after leaving Royal Northern, Llewellyn returned to music by joining a local amateur operatic society. There, a Guildhall répétiteur encouraged her to return to music. After studies with vocal coach Lillian Watson, and a summer opera course in Italy, she joined the Glyndebourne Festival Opera Chorus. While at Glyndebourne, she chose to change her surname from Davidson to her grandfather's name Llewellyn as the actors' union Equity already had a member named Elizabeth Davidson. Llewellyn continued her training at the National Opera Studio, with support from the Peter Moores Foundation. She was awarded the Sir Willard White Trophy as winner of the inaugural Voice of Black Opera competition in Birmingham in 2009.

In 2010, she received an invitation from the English National Opera to play the main part, Mimi, in Jonathan Miller's production of La Bohème. Her performance was widely acclaimed by the press. The Guardian qualified her as "gorgeously toned and rapturous, the evening's real star." In 2011, at 36 hours' notice, she sang the Countess in Fiona Shaw's production of The Marriage of Figaro at the English National Opera. Writing in Opera News, George Hall commented: "Best of all was the Countess, Elizabeth Llewellyn, whose rich-toned, agile soprano offered a level of vocal quality too often missing elsewhere; her performance was the more remarkable given that she was a late replacement, announced only on the day of performance. ...Llewellyn here confirmed her potential as a rising star of the U.K. soprano firmament." In November 2012, she played Micaela in Carmen, a performance which Tim Ashley of The Guardian saw as her going "from strength to strength". In March 2013, she performed Amelia in Verdi's Simon Boccanegra. Rupert Christiansen wrote that, shining brightly, she succeeded in "negotiating one of Verdi's trickiest arias with elegant aplomb."

On 13 October 2019, Llewellyn performed the role of Bess in her Metropolitan Opera debut in New York City in George Gershwin's opera Porgy and Bess.

May 2021 saw the release of Llewellyn's debut album Heart & Hereafter: Songs of Samuel Coleridge-Taylor

Llewellyn was appointed Member of the Order of the British Empire (MBE) in the 2022 Birthday Honours for services to music.
