= Sheila Kanani =

British astronomer

Sheila Kanani MBE
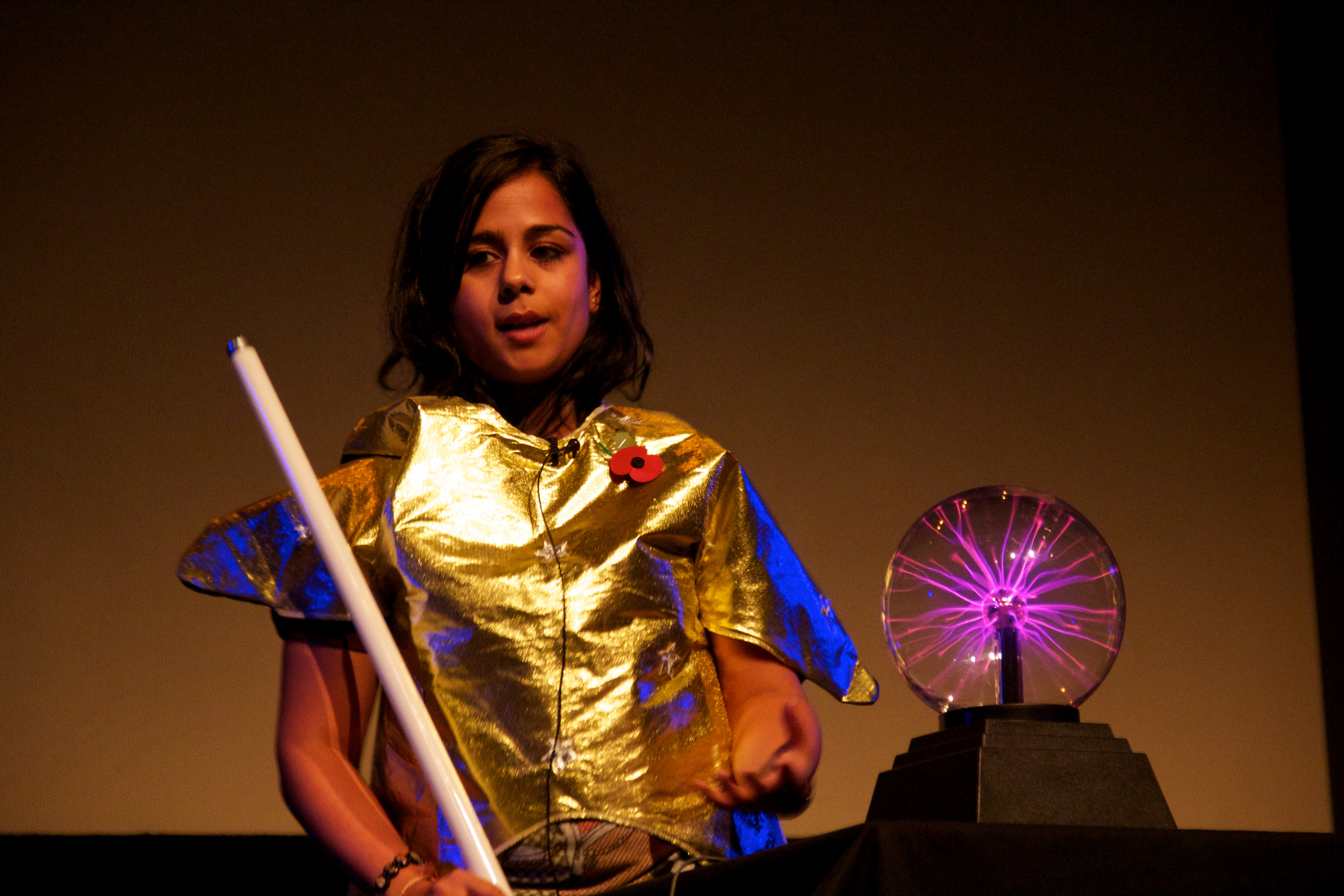
- Kanani at Bright Club London in 2011
- Education: University of Manchester University College London
- Organization: Royal Astronomical Society
- Known for: Astronomy Science Communication

Sheila Pearson MBE (née Kanani) is a British astronomer and the Education, Outreach and Diversity Officer at the Royal Astronomical Society. She is the sister of Nikita Kanani.

== Education ==
Kanani attended Wimbledon High School in South London. She studied Physics with Astrophysics at the University of Manchester, which she graduated from in 2006. Kanani completed several summer placements, working in Australia using the Parkes telescope to search for exoplanets, at Jodrell Bank Observatory using pulsar astronomy. She attended a Space Camp in Houston, Texas. In 2012 she earned her PhD, which saw Kanani working with the Cassini spacecraft, analysing Saturn's magnetosphere from the Mullard Space Science Laboratory. Whilst there, she received a NASA Group Achievement Award.

== Career ==
Kanani spent five years as an astronomer. She briefly became a school physics teacher at Ashton Community Science College in Preston, Lancashire, under head of science Gary Anderton, before taking up her post at the Royal Astronomical Society in 2014. That year, she won the Inspiring Women in Technology award. She has always been interested in public engagement with astronomy. She has become a regular face in the national discussion of science.

Kanani is dedicated to improving the representation of girls and women in physics. In 2017, she wrote an astronomy guide with Elle Magazine. She is identifying new ways to take astronomy and physics to underrepresented communities. Her children's book, 'How To Be An Astronaut and Other Space Jobs', illustrated by illustrator and graphic designer Sol Linero, was published by Nosy Crow in 2019 and was shortlisted for the Blue Peter Book Award.

Kanani wrote ‘Can you GET Jellyfish in SPACE?’, illustrated by Liz Kay, published by Puffin Books for World Book Day 2024.

Kanani was appointed Member of the Order of the British Empire (MBE) in the 2022 New Year Honours for services to astronomy and diversity in physics.

== Personal life ==
Kanani lives in Lytham St Annes.

She is married and has two children.
