= Dorothy Jessie Bartlett =

British chemist (1887 – 1941)

Dorothy Jessie Storey
- Born: Dorothy Jessie Bartlett; 31 July 1887; Brixton, London, England
- Died: 20 January 1941 (aged 53); Manchester, England
- Education: King's College London
- Spouse: William Armstrong Storey

Dorothy Jessie Storey (née Bartlett; 31 July 1887 – 20 January 1941) was a British chemist and pharmacist.

Storey is known for being one the earliest female chemists to win a number of prizes and scholarships from the Pharmaceutical Society. She received a J. C. Hewlett scholarship, a Burroughs scholarship, and a Redwood scholarship, which allowed her to carry out research with Henry Greenish at the Pharmacognosy Research Laboratories. Her research with Arthur William Crossley, another supporter of early women chemists, resulted in a publication on o-Xylene. She then worked as a research chemist at Burgoyne, Burbridges & Co. She was elected an Associate of the Institute of Chemists in 1913.

== Personal life ==
Storey was born in 1887 to Willy Hugh Bartlett, a clerk at a shipping company, and his wife Emily Sophia Bartlett (née Osbourne) in Brixton, London. She attended Streatham Hill High School in Streatham, London. She studied science at the School of the Pharmaceutical Society, where she won several prizes and passed the Major examination to qualify as a pharmacist in 1911. She received a Bachelor of Pharmacy from King’s College London the same year.

On 17 April 1915, she married fellow chemist William Armstrong Storey, and they had a daughter born April 2, 1916.

Storey died on 20 January 1941 in Manchester.
