= Anne Szarewski =

- Born: 1 September 1959; London, England
- Died: 24 August 2013 (aged 53); West Hampstead, London, England
- Citizenship: United Kingdom
- Education: Middlesex Hospital
- Known for: HPV testing
- Spouse: Lester Venter
- Scientific career
- Fields: HPV, cervical cancer
- Workplaces: Imperial Cancer Research Fund; Queen Mary University of London

Anne Szarewski (1 September 1959 – 24 August 2013) was a doctor who helped improve how cervical screening samples are tested and was involved in developing the human papillomavirus (HPV) vaccine.

== Early life and education ==
Anne Szarewski was born in London in 1959, the only child of older Polish parents. She went to Streatham and Clapham High School for Girls before studying medicine at London's Middlesex Hospital, graduating MBBS in 1982.

== Career ==
Szarewski began her career as a doctor at the Whittington Hospital and Royal Free Hospital. She then moved into family planning and sexual health, joining the Margaret Pyke Centre in 1986. She trained in colposcopy at the Royal Northern Hospital under Mr Albert Singer. It was here she developed her interest in cervical cancer detection and screening.

Her academic career began in 1992 at the Mathematics, Statistics and Epidemiology Laboratory of the Imperial Cancer Research Fund, one of the forerunners of Cancer Research UK and continued after 2002 at the Wolfson Institute of Preventive Medicine, Queen Mary University of London.

Szarewski became the editor of the Journal of Family Planning and Reproductive Health Care in 2003.

== Research ==
Szarewski gained her PhD in ‘The effect of cessation of smoking on cervical lesion size and immune cell parameters’, where she showed that, in the absence of treatment, early signs of cervical disease that were picked up through screening in smokers were much more likely to disappear if women gave up smoking. While completing her PhD she also worked on HPV testing for cervical cancer with Jack Cuzick. Szarewski was the clinical lead on the study that showed that testing for the presence of HPV DNA in cells taken during cervical screening would pick up cases of pre-cancer that were missed by the routine test.

This work was followed by a larger trial testing HPV screening – the HART study. Published in 2003, evidence from this played a role in the decision of the International Agency for Research on Cancer (IARC) to recommended that HPV testing could be used in primary cervical screening in 2004.

Szarewski was also a chief investigator, principal investigator and author on key HPV vaccine trials, helping to develop the bivalent HPV vaccine, Cervarix.

== Books ==
Szarewski wrote several books:

- 1988: Cervical Smear Test
- 1989: The Breast Book
- 1991: Hormonal Contraception
- 1994: Contraception
- 1995: A woman's guide to the cervical smear test
- 1996: The cervical smear test
- 1998: Contraception
- 2003: Contraceptive dilemmas
- 2004: Contraception
- 2006: Contraceptive dilemmas

== Personal life ==
Szarewski married South African journalist Lester Venter when she was in her 40s. She loved reading, theatre, classical music and art exhibitions.

According to a tribute in The BMJ, Szarewski was a ‘lover of the arts’. Classical music was her first love, with Richard Wagner her favourite composer, but she also enjoyed David Bowie – one colleague said she had visited the David Bowie exhibition at the V&A museum twice because she enjoyed it so much.

== Death ==
Szarewski died unexpectedly in her sleep on 24 August 2013 at her home in West Hampstead, five days before her 54th birthday. An inquest later found that she had died of acute haemorrhagic pancreatitis.
