= Nikita Kanani =

General practitioner; first woman to be Director of Primary Care in the NHS

- Born: 18 August 1980 (age 46)
- Education: King's College London
- Occupation: Physician

Nikita "Nikki" Kanani MBE (born 18 August 1980) is a general practitioner and the former chief clinical officer of the Bexley Clinical Commissioning Group. In 2018 she became the first woman to be appointed medical director of primary care at NHS England.

== Early life and education ==
Kanani was born in London on 18 August 1980, the daughter of community pharmacists Jagdish Kanani and Keerti Kanani. Her father came to the UK as a refugee from Uganda in 1972, and her parents met at Sunderland Polytechnic. Kanani spoke Gujarati at home. She attended Sutton High School and Guy's, King's and St Thomas' Medical School, and received her BSc in neuroscience in 2001 and an MBBS in 2004. She graduated from King's College London with a postgraduate certificate in managing in health and social care in 2008 and from the University of Birmingham with an MSc in healthcare commissioning in 2014.

== Career ==
Kanani "wants to help provide the time and support for GPs and others working in primary care to develop and improve the services that practices provide". In 2017 she was appointed a Member of the Order of the British Empire (MBE) in the Queen's Birthday Honours for services to Primary Care. With her sister Sheila Kanani she set up STEMMsisters, which empowers people from disadvantaged backgrounds to study science, technology, engineering, mathematics, and medicine subjects and access mentoring and coaching opportunities. She is co-chair of The Network, an online community connecting medical students, doctors and other healthcare professionals. She is a member of the King's Fund General Advisory Group.

She is a general practitioner physician at Bellegrove Surgery in Welling. She is a Clinical Commissioning Champion for the Royal College of General Practitioners. In 2012 and 2013 she was selected by Pulse magazine as a "top up and coming GP". She was named by the Health Service Journal as a "rising star" - an award that celebrates the healthcare leaders of tomorrow and influencers of today.

Kanani is a strong believer in embracing social media within medicine. She is the lead of Quality Improvement at the Faculty of Medical Leadership and Management. She was appointed the interim NHS Director of Primary Care in August 2018.

In September 2019, Kanani was appointed as NHS England's Medical Director for Primary Care. She had previously held the post of Deputy Medical Director for Primary Care, and before that the Chief Clinical Officer of NHS Bexley Clinical Commissioning Group.

Kanani was appointed deputy lead for the NHS's vaccination programme during the COVID-19 pandemic (formally "Deputy Senior Responsible Officer, COVID-19 Vaccination Deployment Programme"), and in January 2021 was appointed to lead a team "to boost Covid vaccine uptake among minority groups by targeting staff from Black, Asian and minority ethnic (BAME) backgrounds". In September 2021, she briefly closed her Twitter account because of the "toxic and demoralising" atmosphere.

In 2021 the Girls' Day School Trust awarded her its Exceptional Contribution Award in recognition of her work on the COVID-19 vaccination programme.

In July 2022 Kanani took up a seconded post with NHS England as Director for Clinical Integration, leading the design and delivery of an integrated clinical model for the NHS.

== Personal life ==
Kanani has a son and a daughter.
