= Audrey T. Carpenter =

British biographer

Audrey T. Carpenter is a British biographer, after an earlier career as a scientific researcher, technical abstractor and librarian.

== Career ==
Audrey Taylor Smith was born in Dorking on 7 September 1935 and grew up mainly in Banstead. She attended Sutton High School from 1942 to 1953. While in Lower IVr she contributed an article about a visit to Cheddar Gorge in 1948.

In 1953 Smith was awarded a State Scholarship, and gained a place at the Imperial College of Science and Technology (now Imperial College London), to read chemistry; she graduated in 1956. She then studied for a PhD at St Mary's Hospital Medical School in Professor Albert Neuberger's Department of Chemical Pathology, under the supervision of J J Scott. She was awarded a PhD from the University of London in 1959.

In September 1961 Audrey and her husband John Carpenter sailed on the Queen Mary to the United States to undertake postdoctoral research. They were first at the New York-Presbyterian Hospital, part of Columbia University College of Physicians and Surgeons at W 168th St, New York. Audrey was in David Sprinson's department. The following summer Carpenter and her husband drove across the United States to the west coast and then back east to Detroit, where she undertook research in the Department of Chemistry at Wayne State University, in T T Tchen's group.

Carpenter returned to the UK in 1963 and in the following year she and her husband moved to Sandwich, Kent. In 1978 the family moved to Marly-le-Roi and later Fourqueux, 20 km west of Paris. Their two daughters attended the Lycée International de Saint-Germain-en-Laye, while John worked in Paris. Audrey had worked from home as a technical abstractor while in Sandwich and was a librarian at the Lycée.

In 1984 the family moved to a village near Loughborough. John had been appointed Technical Director at Riker Laboratories, later 3M Health Care, in Loughborough. Audrey decided to pursue a part-time degree in English at Loughborough University. She was awarded a BA degree in 1990 and went on to study for a PhD under the supervision of Professor Bill Overton. She was awarded her second PhD in 2010, on John Theophilus Desaguliers: her thesis title was "Ingenious Philosopher: John Theophilus Desaguliers (1683-1744), popularizer of Newtonianism and promoter of freemasonry". The thesis was the basis of a biography of Desaguliers, published in 2011.

Carpenter spent the next few years further researching 18th-century people of note, including her 5x great-grandmother, opera singer Giovanna Sestini and Sestini's grandson Joachim Hayward Stocqueler. Several of Carpenter's works have received favourable reviews. She also wrote Sestini's entry in the Oxford Dictionary of National Biography.

Her biography of Desaguliers has been listed by the Museum of Freemasonry in its "Learn about Freemasonry: 12 books to expand your knowledge".

== Personal life ==
Audrey met John G D Carpenter, who was also studying chemistry in the same year at Imperial. They were married at the register office, Epsom in August 1958. They have two daughters, born in Canterbury in 1966 and 1967. Audrey and John now live in Leicestershire.

== Selected publications ==
=== Books ===
- Carpenter, Audrey; Carpenter, John; Jarram, Tony (2007). The Lacemakers' Story: Loughborough, Luddites and Long Journeys. Loughborough: Friends of Charnwood Museum. p. 32. ISBN 9780955626807.
- Carpenter, Audrey T. (2011). John Theophilus Desaguliers: A Natural Philosopher, Engineer and Freemason in Newtonian England. Bloomsbury. ISBN 9781441182227.
- Carpenter, Audrey T. (2017). Giovanna Sestini: an Italian opera singer in eighteenth-century London. Kibworth Beauchamp: Matador. ISBN 978-1-788-03880-5.
- Carpenter, Audrey T. (2018). A Resourceful Rogue: Joachim Hayward Stocqueler (1801-1886). FeedARead.com. ISBN 9781788763707.

=== ODNB contribution ===
- Carpenter, Audrey T. "Sestini, Giovanna [married name Joanna Stocqueler] (1749–1814)". Oxford Dictionary of National Biography (online ed.). Oxford University Press. doi:10.1093/ref:odnb/106538. (Subscription, Wikipedia Library access or UK public library membership required.)

=== Journal articles ===
- Carpenter, Audrey T. (2015). "A "Most enchanting comic actress": Giovanna Sestini, an Italian opera singer in the London theatres". Theatre Notebook. 69 (3): 136–151.
- Carpenter, Audrey T. (Spring 2015). "From Soldier to Newspaperman: The Varied Experiences of Joachim Hayward Stocqueler in Bombay and Calcutta from 1819 to 1843" (PDF). Journal of the Families in British India Society. 33: 3–14.
- Carpenter, Audrey T. (11 April 2016). "Which is the Pseudonym: J.H.Stocqueler or J.H.Siddons?". Notes and Queries. 63 (2). OUP: 254–55. doi:10.1093/notesj/gjw055.
- Carpenter, A T (2016). "J T Desaguliers: 18th century experimental philosopher". The Huguenot Society Journal. 30. London: 4.
- Carpenter, Audrey T. (1 December 2017). "Is This Really a Poem by Lord Macaulay?". Notes and Queries. 64 (4). OUP: 620–22. doi:10.1093/notesj/gjx128.
- Carpenter, Audrey T (2018). "From Vocalist to "Inventor of the Dresses": Vincenzo Sestini's Career at the King's Theatre in the Haymarket". Theatre Notebook. 72: 27–39.
- Carpenter, Audrey T (2020). "Thomas Desaguliers, officer and equerry. Part 1: Development of a career in the Royal Artillery". Huguenot Society Journal. 33. London: 27–41.
- Carpenter, Audrey T (2021). "Thomas Desaguliers, officer and equerry. Part 2: Royal service and development of ordnance". Huguenot Society Journal. 34. London: 16–32.
- Carpenter, A. T. (2022). "Gamaliel Massiot: Artist and Teacher". The Huguenot Society Journal. 35. London: 98–99.
