= Archie Casely-Hayford =

Ghanaian politician and lawyer (1897–1977)

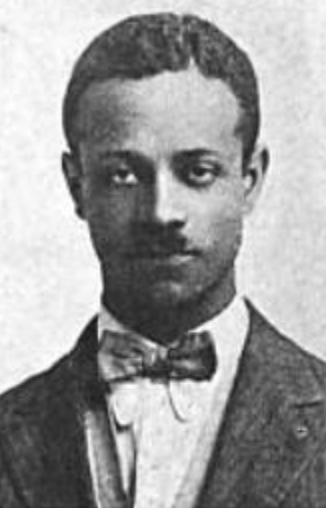
- Casely-Hayford, from a 1929 issue of The Crisis

Personal details
- Born: Archibald Casely-Hayford; 1897 Axim, Gold Coast
- Died: 20 August 1977 (aged 79–80) Accra, Ghana
- Party: Convention People's Party
- Children: Beattie, Louis, Desiree Casely-Hayford and Michael Casely-Hayford
- Parent(s): Beatrice Madelene (née Pinnock) and Joseph Ephraim Casely Hayford
- Education: Mfantsipim School; Dulwich College; Clare College, Cambridge
- Occupation: Barrister and politician

Archibald "Archie" Casely-Hayford (30 November 1897 – 20 August 1977) was a British-trained Ghanaian barrister and politician, who was involved in nationalist politics in the former Gold Coast (present-day Ghana). Having joined the Convention People's Party (CPP), in 1951 he was elected Municipal Member for Kumasi and was appointed by Kwame Nkrumah Minister of Agriculture and Natural Resources in the government of the First Republic. When Nkrumah declared Ghana's Independence on 6 March 1957, he was photographed on the podium flanked by Casely-Hayford, together with Kojo Botsio, Komla Agbeli Gbedemah, Nathaniel Azarco Welbeck and Krobo Edusei.

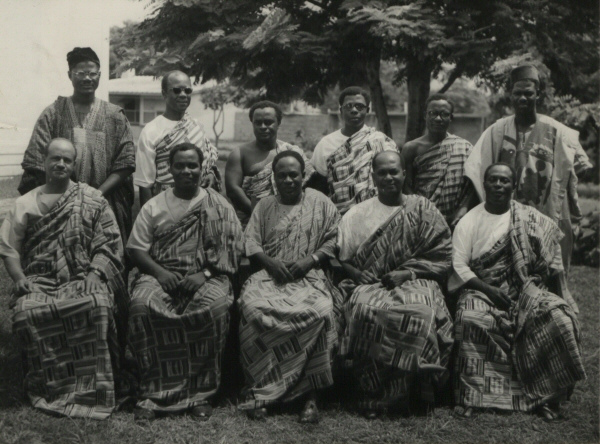
The Gold Coast cabinet, 6 March 1957. Front row, left to right: Archie Casely-Hayford, Kojo Botsio; Kwame Nkrumah; Komla Agbeli Gbedemah, Edward Okyere Asafu-Adjaye (Ghana High Commissioner in London). Back row, left to right: Joseph Henry Allassani, Nathaniel Azarco Welbeck, Kofi Asante Ofori-Atta, Ebenezer Ako-Adjei, John Ernest Jantuah, Imoru Egala, Minister of Industries.

== Biography ==
=== Early years and education ===
Archie Casely Hayford was born in Axim, Gold Coast, to Beatrice Madelene (née Pinnock) and respected pan-Africanist Joseph Ephraim Casely Hayford. He was educated at Mfantsipim School, Cape Coast, and then in Britain at Dulwich College, London. He subsequently studied at Clare College, Cambridge, graduating BA in law and economics, later promoted to MA.

Before leaving London, as Archibald C. Hayford he married Esther (Essie) Smith in May 1921.

After returning home to the Gold Coast, he practised as a lawyer from 1921 until 1936. He became a member of Sekondi Town Council in 1926, and was made a district magistrate in 1936, rising to be senior district magistrate by 1948, before resuming private legal practice.

=== National politics ===
Entering nationalist politics, he joined Kwame Nkrumah's Convention People's Party (CPP), and before the 1951 elections acted as defence counsel for Nkrumah and other CPP leaders, thereby earning the title "Defender of the Verandah Boys". In Nkrumah's first government, Casely-Hayford was appointed Minister of Agriculture and Natural Resources in 1951, and later became Minister of Communications and, in 1954, Minister for the Interior.

=== Honours ===
Casely-Hayford was honoured by Ghana with the Grand Medal and was awarded the Queen's Coronation Medal from Britain.

=== Death and family ===
At the time of his death, at the Ridge Hospital, Accra, on 20 August 1977, he held the post of Chancellor of the University of Cape Coast. In the years prior, he also had been serving as the head of the wider Casely-Hayford family. His eldest son Beattie Casely-Hayford became the first director of the Ghana Arts Council, and his other son Louis Casely-Hayford was a chartered engineer who served as CEO of the Volta River Authority. His youngest son Michael Casely-Hayford is a media consultant. His daughter Desiree was living in Australia as of 2013.
