= Sutton High School, London =

Private girls' school in Sutton, England

Sutton High School GDST

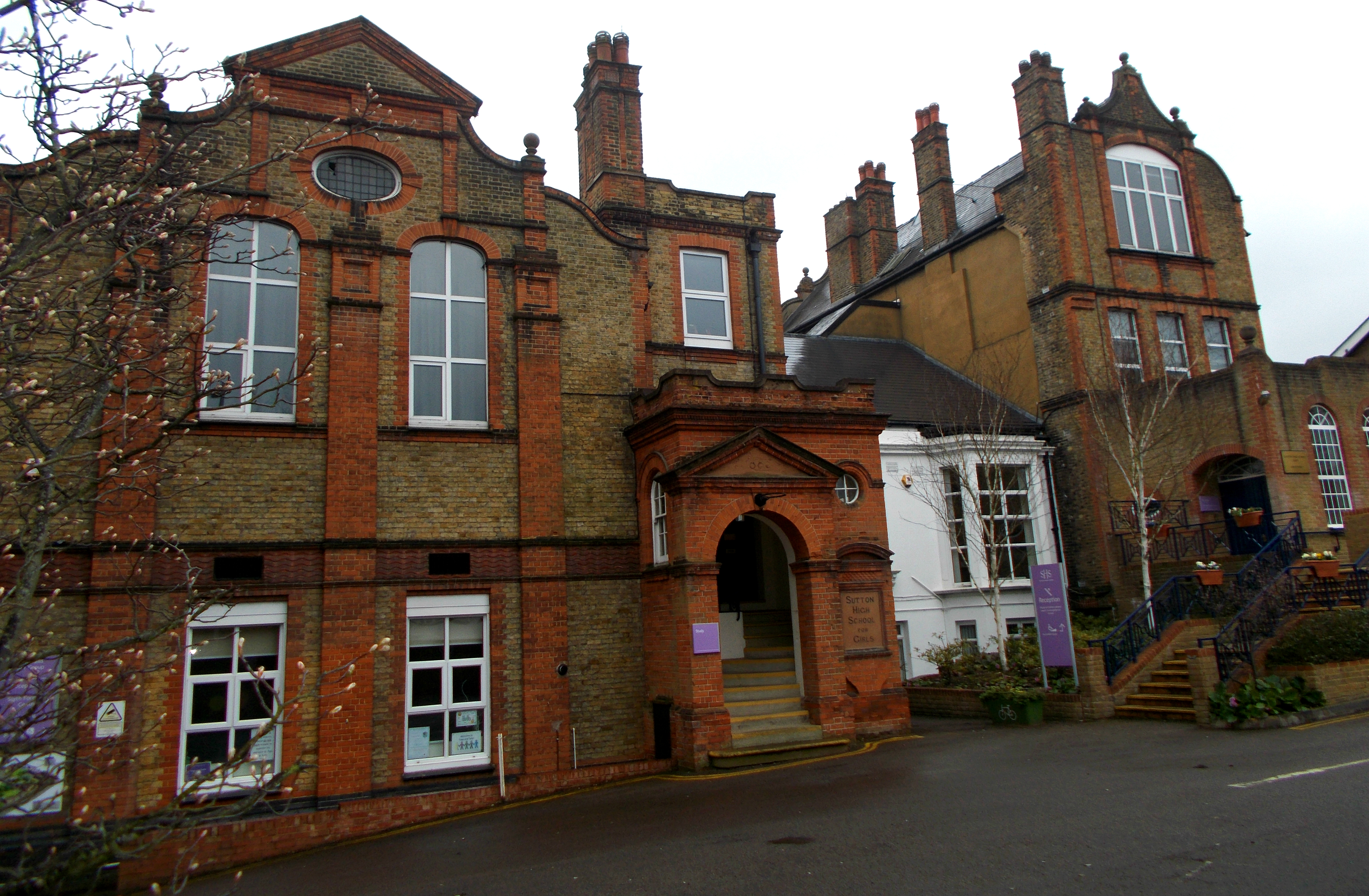
- The school's oldest buildings including the 1886 front door which inspires the logo

Location
- 55 Cheam Road; Sutton, Greater London, SM1 2AX; England
- Coordinates: 51°21′39″N 0°11′51″W

Information
- Type: Private, GDST
- Motto: Fortiter, Fideliter, Feliciter (with courage, with truth, with joy)
- Established: 1884
- Local authority: Sutton
- Department for Education URN: 103022 Tables
- Head: Mrs Beth Dawson
- Gender: Girls
- Age: 3 to 18
- Houses: Dora Black, Frances West, Henrietta Stanley, Phyllis Mudford King
- Colour: purple
- Website: www.suttonhigh.gdst.net

Sutton High School is a private day school for girls aged from 3 to 18 in Sutton, Greater London. It is run by the Girls' Day School Trust (GDST).

It was founded in 1884 by the then Girls' Public Day School Trust (GPDST), and was a direct grant grammar school (some pupils having their fees paid by the local authority as in a state grammar school) until the system was abolished in 1976. The first headmistress was Miss Margaret Whyte, and there were 80 pupils on the opening day, 17 January 1884. It has been listed in "Top 100 Independent School" Sunday Times Parent Power Guide, November 2011.

== Buildings ==
The school's accommodation includes a mix of the purpose-built and the converted from a range of periods, and its oldest building predates the school's foundation in 1884.

The school opened in a residential property, Park House, in Cheam Road, which was rented by the Girls Day School Company. By 1886 this had been extended on both sides. This group of buildings is still at the core of the school, and the front door forms the basis of the school logo. In the period between the world wars the buildings were extended westward along Cheam Road, and in 1932 Suffolk House was acquired. The assembly hall was built in 1935, linking Suffolk House to the existing buildings. In 1930 Homestead House in the parallel Grove Road was acquired, to be followed by Hayes House and its neighbour, so that the school's grounds extended between the two streets. The Library was built in 1938, to the south of the core, and in 1959 the Lilian Charlesworth Room was added above it, named after Lilian Charlesworth who had been headmistress from 1939. A new science and language block was opened in 1971 and a swimming pool in 1972. In the 1990s a new "Garden Building" was built, and the former Dene Hotel was bought and converted into a sixth form unit. The school opened its new sustainability-built prep building, Fernwood House, and its new MUGA or multi use games area in September 2022.

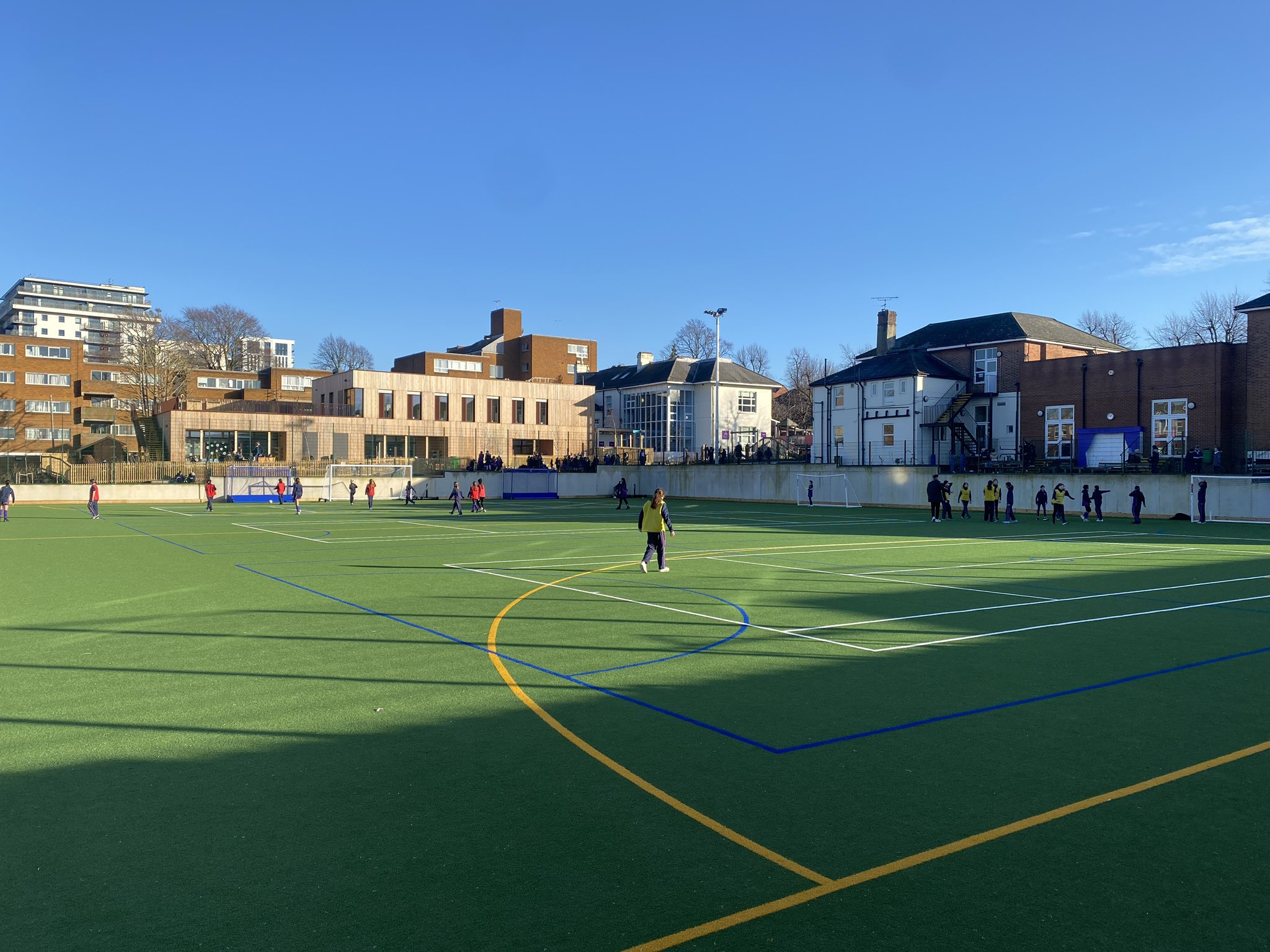
MUGA

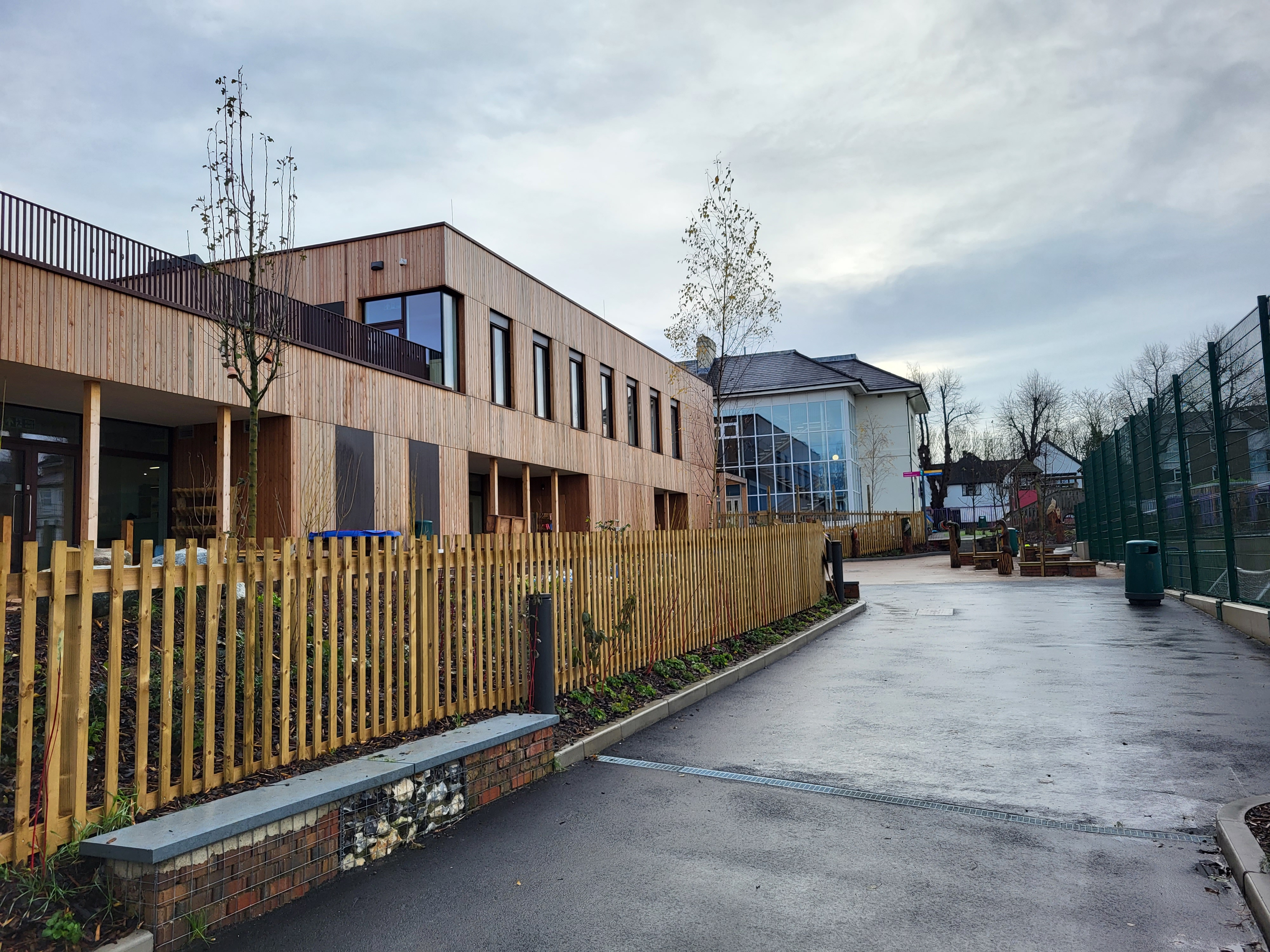
Fernwood House

== Notable former pupils ==
- Alice Embleton (1876–1960), biologist, zoologist and suffragist.
- Dora Russell (born Dora Black, 1894–1986), author, feminist and progressive campaigner
- Phyllis Mudford King (1906–2006), Wimbledon ladies doubles winner 1931
- Joan Hutt (1913–85), artist
- Audrey T. Carpenter (née Smith) (born 1935), author
- Susan Howatch (born 1940), author
- Helen Dunmore (1952–2017), novelist and poet
- Ruth Kelly (born 1968), politician
- Nikita Kanani (born 1980), medical director for Primary Care, NHS England and recipient of 2021 GDST Exceptional Contribution Award
- Marianna Spring (born 1996), BBC journalist

== House system ==
Since 2009 the school has had a house system. The four houses are named after women connected to the school:

- Dora Black (1894–1986), author, feminist and campaigner, former pupil; granddaughter-in-law of Henrietta Stanley
- Phyllis Mudford King (1905–2006), tennis player, former pupil
- Henrietta Stanley (1807–1895), campaigner for women's education and one of the founders of the GDST; grandmother-in-law of Dora Black
- Frances West (1875–1969), the first SHS pupil known to have attended university (Somerville College, Oxford), and later headmistress of St Winifred's and Raven's Croft schools in Eastbourne.

== Notes ==
- a: "Greater London" is not part of the postal address. The school lists its postal address as "55 Cheam Road, Sutton, Surrey SM1 2AX", reflecting the pre-1965 county boundary. The correct postal address as given by the Royal Mail is "55 Cheam Road, SUTTON SM1 2AX"
