= Streatham and Clapham High School =

Coordinates: 51.4351°N 0.1381°W

Streatham & Clapham High School
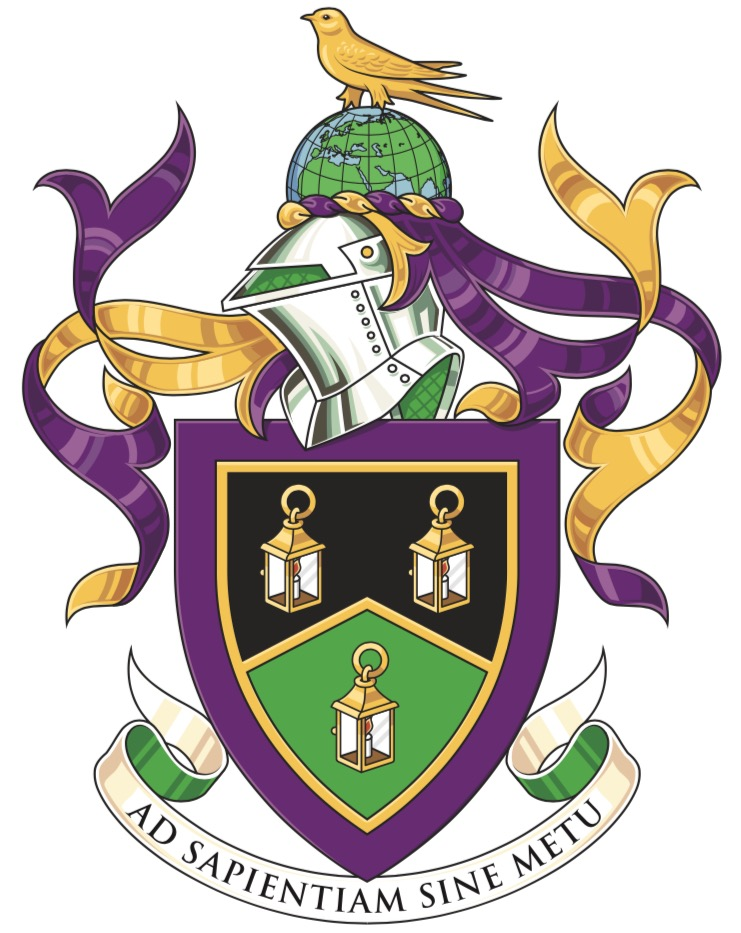
- The school's coat of arms, granted by the College of Arms in 2017

Information
- Type: Private day school
- Motto: ad sapientiam sine metu
- Established: 1887
- Department for Education URN: 100648 Tables
- Chairman of Governors: Jane Rankin
- Head: Cathy Ellott
- Gender: Girls
- Age: 3 to 18
- Houses: Carter, Franklin, Fawcett, Paston Brown, Knights
- Colours: green, purple, grey
- Affiliations: HMC, GSA, GDST
- Head of Prep School: Helen Loach
- Location (Senior School): 42 Abbotswood Road, Streatham, London. SW16 1AW
- Location (Prep School): Wavertree Road, Streatham Hill, London. SW2 3SR
- Website: http://www.schs.gdst.net/

Streatham & Clapham High School is a private day school for girls aged 3 to 18, in south London. The school was founded in 1887 by the Girls' Public Day School Company, which established schools for girls providing academic, moral and religious education.

The Head is Cathy Ellott.

The ability profile of the school is above the national average, with a proportion of pupils being far above the national average. The 2019 Independent Schools Inspectorate report awarded the school the highest grade in both categories inspected ('Excellent'): the quality of pupils' academic and other achievements and the quality of their personal development.

The school is located on two sites, the Prep School in a Victorian building in Wavertree Road, London SW2, and the Senior School (including the Sixth Form) in buildings designed in the 1930s by J. E. K. Harrison.

== History ==
'Brixton Hill High School' began in February 1887 in a house at 260 Brixton Hill. Continued expansion led in 1894 to a temporary move to a home in Palace Road to await the completion of the new building in Wavertree Road, Streatham Hill (now the location of the Junior School). The building was opened by H.R.H. Princess Louise, Duchess of Argyll in 1895, and the school was soon renamed Streatham Hill High School. In 1938 Streatham Hill merged with (but essentially took over) the older Clapham High School (established in 1875, with Mary Jemima Alger as its first head), and was renamed 'Streatham Hill and Clapham High School'.

During the Second World War some girls were evacuated from London, while others continued their schooling in often difficult conditions. A V-1 bomb damaged the school on 27 July 1944, and though parts of the building were still usable, the operation of the school had to be split between four separate sites. Two of the sites were 'Winchester House' on Upper Tulse Hill and 'Courtlands' on Christchurch Road. The contract for rebuilding was signed in 1949, and then followed three years of demolition and reconstruction.

On 22 October 1952, Princess Alice, Duchess of Gloucester, as Patroness of the Girls' Public Day School Trust, opened the new Wavertree Road building. The further expansion of the school led to the GPDST's purchase in 1993 of a new site (for the Senior School) at Abbotswood Road, the former buildings of the Battersea Grammar School, purchased from London South Bank University.

Since then the Abbotswood Road site has been expanded with the Millennium Building, comprising an Art Suite, Music Suite and a Recital Hall, and a Sports Hall. In January 2017, a new Sixth Form Centre opened on the newly built fourth storey on the Harrison building, followed in April 2018 by a new dining hall, reception and fountain atrium. These additions to the school, designed by Cottrell and Vermeulen Architecture, won the Royal Institute of British Architects' London Award and the Retrofit Award in the School Project category, and were also shortlisted for the Education Architect of the Year Award.

== Findings of the ISI Inspection 2019 ==
The Independent Schools Inspectorate inspected Streatham & Clapham High School in October 2019 and awarded the school the highest grade ("Excellent") in both categories inspected: the quality of pupils’ achievements and the quality of pupils’ personal development.

== Heads of Streatham and Clapham High School ==
- Miss Alice Tovey (1887–1898), Headmistress
- Miss Reta Oldham (1898–1923), Headmistress
- Miss Ruth Gwatkin (1923–1938), Headmistress
- Miss Marjorie Jarrett (1938–1947), Headmistress
- Miss Margaret Macaulay (1947–1963), Headmistress
- Miss Agnete Wulff (1963–1973), Headmistress
- Mrs Nancy Silver (1973–1978), Headmistress
- Miss Gillian M. Ellis (1979–2002), Headmistress
- Mrs Susan Mitchell (2002–2011), Headmistress
- Mr Richard Hinton (2011), Acting Head Master
- Dr Millan Sachania (2012-2022), Head Master
- Mr Richard Hinton (2022-2023), Acting Head Master
- Ms Cathy Ellott (2023–Present), Head

== Notable past pupils ==
- Professor Wendy Atkin OBE, researcher whose work led to breakthrough in bowel cancer screening
- Dame Beryl Paston Brown, Principal of Homerton College, Cambridge, and of the City of Leicester Training College at Scraptoft
- Angela Carter, the twentieth-century novelist
- Margaret Casely-Hayford CBE, lawyer, businesswoman and public figure
- Lilian Charlesworth, leading headteacher and internationalist
- Philippa Fawcett, the first woman to lead the Mathematical Tripos at University of Cambridge
- Prof Eileen Hogan, artist
- Elizabeth Killick, first woman Fellow of the Royal Academy of Engineering
- Elizabeth Llewellyn, operatic soprano
- Maryam Moshiri, News Presenter, BBC News
- Elsie Owusu OBE, architect
- Bell Ribeiro-Addy MP, the member of parliament for Streatham since 2019
- Professor Nicola Rollock, academic and writer, Professor of Social Policy & Race, King's College London
- Margery Sharp, author of the 1959 The Rescuers which became a 1977 Disney film
- Sally-Anne Stapleford OBE, President from 1995 to 2006 of the National Ice Skating Association
- Anne Szarewski, cancer researcher
- Hannah Waddingham, actress and singer
- Dame June Whitfield, actress
- Valerie Sybil Wilmer, photographer and writer
- Dorothy Jessie Bartlett, research chemist

== Former teachers ==
- Dame Mary Green, Headmistress from 1954 to 1973 of Kidbrooke School, London's first main comprehensive school (taught from 1938 to 1940)
- Danielle de St. Jorre (taught French from 1967 to 1969)
- Margaret Kemp-Welch, artist and print maker, who taught art
