= Finding Fela =

2014 documentary film directed by Alex Gibney

- Promotional release poster
- Directed by: Alex Gibney
- Produced by: Alex Gibney; Jack Gulick
- Production companies: Jigsaw Productions; Okayafrica
- Release date: January 17, 2014 (Sundance Film Festival)
- Running time: 120 minutes
- Country: United States
- Language: English

Finding Fela is a 2014 American documentary film directed by Alex Gibney, portraying and analysing the life of Nigerian musician Fela Kuti. The film had its world premiere at the 2014 Sundance Film Festival on January 17, 2014.

== Synopsis ==
A look at the life and music of Nigerian singer Fela Kuti, interwoven with extended scenes of the development of the New York musical Fela! and interviews with its director Bill T. Jones.

== Reception ==
Finding Fela received mixed reviews from critics. Geoffrey Berkshire of Variety, said in his review: "This watchable but rather rote chronicle fails to find a compelling perspective on Kuti's significant life and legacy." David Rooney of The Hollywood Reporter praised the film by describing it as "An absorbing if not quite definitive patchwork of the life and legacy of an unorthodox artist."

Extracts from the film featured in the 2015 British Library exhibition West Africa: Word, Symbol, Song.

== See also ==
- List of films at the 2014 Sundance Film Festival
