= West Africa: Word, Symbol, Song =

2015–2016 exhibition in London

Coordinates: 51°31′46″N 0°07′37″W

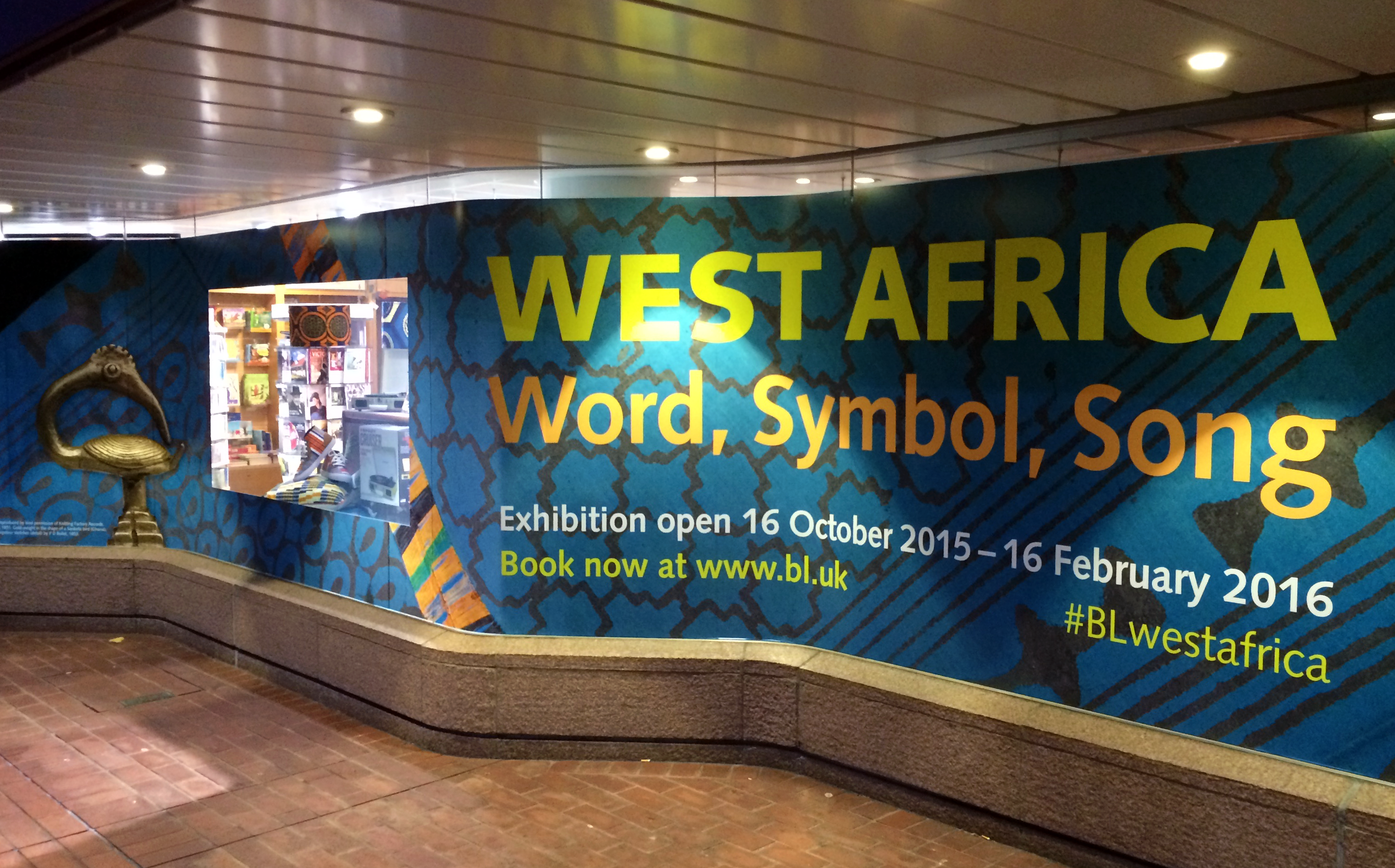
West Africa: Word, Symbol, Song at the British Library

West Africa: Word, Symbol, Song was a major four-month exhibition at the British Library in London, the first of its kind in the UK to explore in detail the cultural history of the region, through literature, artefacts, art, music and performance – which ran from 16 October 2015 to 16 February 2016.

== Background ==
Gus Casely-Hayford speaking at the opening of the exhibition (2015)

Co-curated by Marion Wallace (Curator of African Collections) and Janet Topp Fargion (Curator of World and Traditional Music), with an advisory panel chaired by Gus Casely-Hayford, the show spanned 2,000 years, 1,000 languages and 17 different countries: a broad definition of the region allowed for the inclusion of Benin, Burkina Faso, Cameroon, Cape Verde, Côte d'Ivoire, Guinea, Guinea-Bissau, The Gambia, Ghana, Liberia, Mali, Mauritania, Niger, Nigeria, Senegal, Sierra Leone and Togo.

The exhibition made use of manuscripts, historic film and sound recordings, books, photographs, and woven and printed textiles, to underline a literary culture that is centuries old, while co-existing with ancient oral traditions. Headphones delivered spoken-word recitals, songs and the sounds of musical instruments, as part of an audio-visual journey from the 14th-century epic poem about Sundiata, founder of the Mali Empire, through to the Notting Hill Carnival and a specially designed Bélé costume.

Among writers and artists celebrated in a variety of events were Nobel Literature Prize winner Wole Soyinka and his cousin, the musician and activist Fela Kuti, whom Soyinka called the "scourge of corrupt power, mimic culture and militarism" A room dedicated to Fela featured a letter written by him to the then Nigerian president General Ibrahim Babangida in 1989, agitating for political change, and extracts from the 2014 documentary Finding Fela. Geographical magazine stated: "Crucially, the exhibition boasts the philosophic writings of Kwame Nkrumah, first prime minister of Ghana, the articles of Mable Dove Danquah [sic], political journalist who was the first woman to be elected to a member of any African assembly, and textiles and writings dedicated to Chinua Achebe, the novelist and professor best known for his incendiary novel Things Fall Apart."

The exhibition was accompanied by an extensive programme of talks, events, performances and workshops, with participants including Lemi Ghariokwu, Kanya King, June Sarpong, Levi Roots, Yinka Ilori, Chibundu Onuzo, Aina More, Inua Ellams, Ade Solanke, Stephen Kelman, Jacob Sam-La Rose, and others.

== Critical reception ==
West Africa: Word, Symbol, Song received widespread and largely positive notices. A review by Richard Bourne in The Round Table: The Commonwealth Journal of International Affairs suggested that the exhibition might have been over-ambitious, but others considered that its scope was given coherence by the five threads it followed: Building States, Spirit, Crossings, Speaking Out and Story Now. It earned a five-star rating in Time Out for its coverage of "the empires of the Middle Ages, colonialism, independence and the game-changing writers and artists found in the region today" and its exploration of such themes as religion, protest and the power of words. In The Guardian, Thembi Mutch wrote: "The exhibition celebrates the complexity and diversity of west Africa’s heritage, while never sidestepping the more thorny issues of rebellion, protest and the transatlantic slave trade....Divided into five sections, the exhibition is unflinching, funny and a labour of impressive research. It involves collaborations with south London drumming groups, New York academics, west African lorry drivers, Nigerian scholars and community organisations. It gives a way to thread people, ideas and objects together – and explores African history from a non-institutional perspective."

Vincent Dowd of the BBC World Service noted that "the British Library has not created a dry display of dusty, ethnographic curiosities and folk literature. The display is helped hugely by the long tradition in West Africa of music, from the most ancient to the era of rap." The reviewer for Francophone Africa pointed out: "The main strength of this exhibition is the focus on having the stories and symbols of West Africa told by West Africans themselves rather than through a European lens. This is not always possible (for example some of the ethnographic recordings), but it does a fantastic job of not depriving the main actors of their voices." For Mark Beech of Dante magazine, "Some of the most powerful displays are by those who experienced exploitation and managed to escape. Ignatius Sancho, who was born on a slave ship and went on to become an influential intellectual figure, and Phillis Wheatley, who was enslaved as a child and went on to write Romantic poetry." Other highlights that drew comment from African reviewers included: "Most enlightening are the sections devoted to African orthography that pre-dates the introduction of the Roman alphabet by Europeans as well as newer scripts like N'ko, invented by Souleymane Kanté in 1947 and used by speakers of the Dioula, Bambara and Malinka languages.... 'The Building States' section is a heartening reminder that prior to the transatlantic slave trade and colonisation, West Africa was home to formidable empires such as those of Ghana (modern day Mauritania and Mali), the Songhai, the Wolof, Mali and the Kingdom of Asante."

The Londonist called it "a detailed and insightful look at the history of a culture which has had a massive influence on the world we live in today." Seeing it as "a landmark exhibition [that] finally explodes the colonial myth of Africa being the dark continent", A. J. James in Nigerian Watch said: "This unprecedented collection of exhibits rewrites history and puts on display a millennia of our glorious history.... This is a brilliant exhibition and a brilliant breakthrough. The last colonial chain is finally snapped. In similar vein, The Metropolist welcomed that the exhibition left "no room for previously held misconceptions about West Africa", and The Cultural Exposé concluded: "So if there was ever a question about the significance of Africa to the development of culture and civilisation, this exhibition is a metaphorical bomb drop. Prepare to be enlightened."

== Publication ==
The book West Africa: Word, Symbol, Song, edited by Gus Casely-Hayford, Janet Topp Fargion and Marion Wallace, was produced by the British Library to accompany the exhibition.

== Legacy ==
In 2018, in partnership with the British Library, the Aké Arts and Book Festival in Lagos, Nigeria, presented digital highlights of the exhibition in a "Memory Room".
