= Joseph de Graft Hayford =

Wesleyan Methodist minister on the Gold Coast

- Born: 1840
- Died: 1919 (aged 78–79); London, England
- Occupation: Wesleyan Methodist minister
- Spouse: Mary Ewuraba Brew
- Children: Josiah Hayford, Isaac Hayford, Ibinijah Hayford, Ernest James Hayford, Joseph Ephraim Casely Hayford, Mark Christian Hayford, Hester Hayford, Helen Mary Hayford, and Sydney Spencer Hayford

Joseph de Graft Hayford (1840–1919) was a Ghanaian Wesleyan Methodist minister who was a prominent figure in Fante politics and society in the Gold Coast. He was one of the founders of the Fante Confederation of 1867 and one of the first political detainees in Ghanaian history.

== Background ==
De Graft Hayford was a supporter of the Methodist church planter Thomas Birch Freeman and when Freeman was forced to resign from his post in 1857, de Graft Hayford also left the church; he later returned and became a preacher for the denomination.

He has been described as "one of the greatest politicians of his day, and the most active member of the Fanti Confederacy of 1867". When the Confederacy was declared illegal, he was one of the four leaders to be arrested on a charge of conspiracy, the others being James Hutton Brew, James F. Amissah and George Kunto Blankson.

== Family ==
Of the Anona clan of Cape Coast, he was the husband of Mary Awuraba Brew (daughter of the prominent Gold Coast trader Samuel Collins Brew and Adjuah Esson) and his children were: Rev. Josiah Hayford, Isaac Hayford, Ibinijah Hayford, Rev. Dr Ernest James Hayford, Rev. Mark Christian Hayford, Rev. Mark Christian Hayford, Joseph Ephraim Casely Hayford, Hester Hayford, Helen Mary Hayford and Sydney Spencer Hayford.

J. E. married Adelaide Casely-Hayford and the poet Gladys Casely-Hayford was Joseph's granddaughter.

His descendants continued to be leaders in law, politics and arts, and in 2008, the Casely-Hayfords were named as the most influential black family in the UK.
