= Lost Kingdoms of Africa =

- DVD cover
- Directed by: Sarah Howitt, Ian Lilley, Mark Bates
- Narrated by: Dr. Gus Casely-Hayford
- Country of origin: United Kingdom
- Original language: English
- No. of seasons: 2
- No. of episodes: 8

Production
- Executive producer: Rachel Bell
- Producers: Ross Harper, Michael Simkin
- Running time: 60 minutes
- Production company: IWC Media for BBC

Original release
- Network: BBC Four
- Release: 5 January 2010 – 20 February 2012

Lost Kingdoms of Africa is a British television documentary series. It is produced by the BBC. It describes the pre-colonial history of Africa. The series is narrated by Dr. Gus Casely-Hayford.

The series was originally commissioned as part of the Wonderful Africa Season on BBC Four in the lead up to the 2010 World Cup.

The first season of Lost Kingdoms of Africa was originally screened in the UK on BBC Four each Tuesday night over four weeks, starting on 5 January 2010. The second season of Lost Kingdoms of Africa was broadcast over four weeks, starting on 30 January 2012.

== Episode list: Season One ==
=== Episode 1: Nubia ===
First aired on 5 January 2010

- Art historian Gus Casely-Hayford explores the history of the old African kingdom of Nubia.

=== Episode 2: Ethiopia ===
First aired on 12 January 2010

- The Kingdom of Ethiopia.

=== Episode 3: Great Zimbabwe ===
First aired on 19 January 2010

- Great Zimbabwe, a symbol of African genius.

=== Episode 4: West Africa ===
First aired on 26 January 2010

- An investigation of 16th-century bronzes from the Kingdom of Benin.

== Episode list: Season Two ==
=== Episode 1: The Kingdom of Asante ===
First aired on 30 January 2012

- Asante, a kingdom that was built on gold and slaves.

=== Episode 2: The Zulu Kingdom ===
First aired on 6 February 2012

- The secrets behind the Zulus' cultural power and military strength.

=== Episode 3: The Berber Kingdom of Morocco ===
First aired on 13 February 2012

- Morocco, once the centre of a vast kingdom created by Berbers.

=== Episode 4: Bunyoro & Buganda ===
First aired on 20 February 2012

- How the Ugandan kingdom of Bunyoro saw its dominance challenged by the rise of Buganda.

== See also ==
- List of kingdoms in pre-colonial Africa
