= Elsie Owusu =

Ghana-born British architect

Elsie Owusu OBE RA RIBA FRSA
- Born: Elsie Margaret Owusu; Ghana
- Education: Streatham and Clapham High School
- Occupation: Architect
- Website: www.owusu.uk

Elsie Owusu is a Ghana-born British architect, a founding member and the first chair of the Society of Black Architects. She is also known to have co-led the refurbishment of the Supreme Court of the United Kingdom in 2009 and worked on Green Park tube station. She has been an elected Royal Institute of British Architects (RIBA) Council member since 2014, and vice-chair of the London School of Architecture.

== Education and career ==
Elsie Owusu was born in Ghana and in November 1953 moved with her parents to the UK, where her father was a diplomat in London. She attended Streatham and Clapham High School in London.

She has been working as an architect since 1986, founding her own architectural practice, Elsie Owusu Architects (EOA), of which she remains principal. EOA has worked with artist Sir Peter Blake on the low energy house, 60 Aden Grove, that was assembled in three days. As executive architect for this project, EOA has also designed houses and apartments for the Ujima Housing Association. EOA is currently working in partnership with Symbiotica and NS Design Consultants on the living space of UK/Nigerian artist Yinka Shonibare.

Owusu was a partner for 10 years with Fielden+Mawson, where she was co-lead architect for the UK Supreme Court and the master planning team for London's Green Park Station. Owusu, in partnership with Fielden+Mawson, also oversaw the accommodation of the Lammas Centre for St. Bernard's Hospital. As a conservation architect, she has also worked on public transport and regeneration projects in Ghana and Nigeria. She is a director of the UK company JustGhana, which promotes investment, sustainable development and constructive social engagement in Ghana, as well as a director of ArchQuestra, "formed to provide the best of British architecture, art and engineering to support emerging economies". In 2015, she was one of 12 to be named a "RIBA role models" in support of inclusivity and diversity.

She has been a board member of organisations including Arts Council England, the National Trust of England, and the UK Supreme Court Arts Trust, as well as being a trustee of the Council of the Royal Institute of British Architects (RIBA) and of the Architectural Association.

In 2017, to mark the 25th anniversary of the murder of Stephen Lawrence, who had hoped to become an architect, Owusu launched, with the Stephen Lawrence Charitable Trust, the RIBA+25 campaign to boost diversity in architecture, a profession that was reported by Architects' Journal in 2015 to be "one of the least diverse in the UK, with 94 percent of architects defined as white", and only 4,000 of RIBA's 27,000 chartered architects being women. After the "+25" initiative, which received support from such colleagues as David Adjaye, Alison Brooks and Richard Rogers, Owusu was no longer the sole non-white member of the RIBA governing council but one of 12.

In 2017, Owusu was announced as a candidate for the presidency of RIBA, nominated by more than 70 chartered architects including Sir David Adjaye OBE, Owen Luder CBE, Deborah Saunt and Yasmin Shariff, and endorsed by Baroness Doreen Lawrence. Owusu has spoken out about issues around institutional racism and sexism within the architectural industry.

In 2024, Owusu's forthcoming first book entitled, The World that Jack Built, was acquired by Faber & Faber for publication in 2027.

== Awards ==
She was voted African Business Woman of the Year in 2014.

She was appointed an OBE in the Queen's 2003 Birthday Honours list, and has said: "To my great pride my citation for my OBE was as chair of the Society of Black Architects. I am a campaigning architect. That’s what I do. It’s part of my architectural life." She has also been elected a Fellow of the Royal Society of Arts.

Owusu received a Recognition Award at the 2017 Women4Africa Award.
