= Ethiopia Unbound =

1911 book by J. E. Casely Hayford

Ethiopia Unbound: Studies in Race Emancipation
- Title page for Ethiopia Unbound: Studies in Race Emancipation (1911)
- Author: J. E. Casely Hayford
- Language: English
- Published: London
- Publisher: C. M. Philips
- Publication date: 1911; 115 years ago
- Media type: Print

Ethiopia Unbound: Studies in Race Emancipation is a 1911 book by J. E. Casely Hayford that is one of the first novels in English by an African writer and has been cited as the earliest pan-African fiction. It was first published by C. M. Philips in London. It has been described as "one of the most important contributions to the literature on African nationalism", which made a plea for a unified African nation.

== Background ==
Set in both Africa and England, Ethiopia Unbound relies on philosophical debates between an African and his English friend, as well as references to contemporary African events and ancient African history, to provide a context for its exploration of African identity and the struggle for emancipation.

=== Reception ===
The book's wide coverage on its initial publication ranged from comments in a letter from pan-Africanist Edward Wilmot Blyden — "The more I read 'Ethiopia Unbound', the more I see that it is not your book, but an inspiration. It has given me more joy and encouragement than anything I have seen for many years" — to a review in the New York Independent Weekly Magazine of 26 October 1911, describing it as "a volume in the guise of a story, which is but a disguise to set forth the way our Christian civilisation and our Anglo-Saxon arrogance appear to a black native of the Gold Coast of Africa ... who looks forward to seeing Africa belong to the Africans rather than to the Europeans who have partitioned it. The book is worth reading."

A review in the Journal of the African Society, noting how Casely Hayford had "cast his ideas on the subject of racial problems more or less into the form of fiction", concluded that the book afforded "interesting glimpses of native life, of the life of African students in London, and of officialdom on the Gold Coast as it impresses the native mind. The unusual point of view alone would make the book worth reading for Europeans, apart from the intrinsic interest of the problems under discussion; and the freshness and simplicity with which they are presented, even the occasional quaintness which reminds us that English is not the author's natural medium of expression, render it unusually attractive."

In the view of United Empire, journal of the Royal Colonial Institute, it is "a book that is worth careful reading and sympathetic study. There is much in it that will jar upon the European reader, and much that will even cause the incautious and rash to throw the book down unread. But if the reader will persevere to the end he will be amply rewarded." Publication ranging from the Jamaica Times to The Morning Post also praised the book.

The Pittsburgh Courier reviewer said: "It is a serious book, written in a happy, hopeful vein, and discusses with masterful ability, keen logic and philosophical reasoning the great world question—the relation of the darker races to the dominant races and the cause of the impotence and helplessness of the latter. The author points out a way which he thinks will have the effect of begetting more consideration and respect for those dark races, which are being used as shuttle-cocks by the dominant, grasping, greedy nations of the world. 'Ethiopia Unbound' is a remarkable book." As described by The National Watchman (Topeka, Kansas): "Mr. Hayford weaves romance, poetry, history, modern Christianity, the evolution of race persecution and recent striving into a plea for fidelity to racial ideals which will bring about the freedom of which he prophesies when Ethiopia unbound will be a reality.

Decades after the book's 1911 first publication in London by C. M. Philips, a second edition of Ethiopia Unbound was published in 1969 by Frank Cass & Co, with an Introduction by F. Nnabuenyi Ugonna, who stated: "Ethiopia Unbound is undoubtedly one of the most important contributions to the literature of African nationalism."

A centennial edition was subsequently issued in 2010 by Black Classic Press, edited by African-American scholar Molefi Kete Asante, who introduced it by writing: "This book is extraordinary in its optimism. One could approach the book as a novel, a philosophical treatise, a dialogue of rationalism an Edwardian romance, or as a meditation on love of self, family, and community. It is all of these and more because it is filled with Greek myths as reference and is a sound political tract on the contemporary strivings of the Turks and the Russians as well as British colonial life. Yet Hayford is certain in the end that there would be victory over the colonial oppression in the Gold Coast and that his people, the Fante, would enjoy their own freedoms and independence as citizens equal to any in the world. For him, this is the aim for the entire Ethiopian world, by which he means all of Africa. 'Rise, you mighty giant! Rise! Ethiopia will soon be unbound!' And so it was...."

== Legacy ==
The author's grandson, celebrated designer Joe Casely-Hayford (1956–2019), would cite Ethiopia Unbound as having influenced his creative process through its central concept that "an immigrant can be conversant in an alien culture while retaining their other self", functioning both inside and outside two contrasting cultures: "It was about the idea of duality and double-consciousness, what W.E.B. Du Bois talked about, that when you're black you’re never just one identity; you're aware of both yourself and how you're viewed by the majority at all times. My grandfather wore Kente cloth to study at Cambridge, and Savile Row to visit family in Ghana. He didn't make clothes, but what he wore was political. He was very much interested in the idea of African emancipation and black people thinking in much broader terms than they had been allowed to."
