= Margaret Casely-Hayford =

British lawyer, businesswoman and public figure (born 1959)

Margaret Casely-Hayford CBE
- Born: Margaret Henrietta Augusta Casely-Hayford; 1954 (age 71–72); London, England
- Education: Streatham and Clapham High School; Somerville College, Oxford; Inns of Court School of Law
- Occupations: Lawyer, businesswoman and public figure
- Relatives: J. E. Casely Hayford (grandfather); Gus Casely-Hayford and Joe Casely-Hayford (brothers)
- Website: margaretcasely-hayford.com

Margaret Henrietta Augusta Casely-Hayford CBE (born 1959) is a British lawyer, businesswoman and public figure who is active in the voluntary sector. She is at the forefront of working to create diversity on boards. Casely-Hayford was a candidate in the 2024 University of Oxford Chancellor election, described by The Times as an outside bet for the role, with William Hague eventually being elected.

== Biography ==
=== Background and education ===
Margaret Casely-Hayford was born in London, England, into the prominent Ghanaian Casely-Hayford family: she is the daughter of Victor Casely-Hayford, an accountant who had trained as a barrister, her grandfather was the Gold Coast lawyer, writer and politician J. E. Casely Hayford, and her brothers are historian Gus Casely-Hayford, designer Joe Casely-Hayford and Peter Casely-Hayford, formerly managing director of TV production company Twenty Twenty. In 2008, the Casely-Hayfords were named as part of the "Powerlist" as the most influential black family in the UK.

Casely-Hayford was educated at Streatham and Clapham High School, a private day school for girls; she studied law at Somerville College, Oxford, graduating in 1982, and did her Bar finals at the Inns of Court School of Law, being called to the Bar in 1983 (Gray's Inn).

She received an Honorary Doctorate of Arts from Coventry University in July 2025.

=== Career ===
Casely-Hayford worked for 20 years with the law firm Dentons, where she was made a Partner, becoming the first black woman to hold such a position in a City firm. She specialised in planning matters, and in 1995 wrote a book entitled Practical Planning: Permission and the Application.

From 2000 to 2008, she was a government-appointed trustee of Great Ormond Street Children's Hospital Charity and of the Geffrye Museum and was on the development board of the Young Vic theatre. During 2012–16, she was a non-executive director of NHS England, and on the Board of the British Retail Consortium. She also served on the Metropolitan Police panel overseeing the investigation into police corruption. She is in the forefront of working to create diversity on boards.

For nine years, until 2014, she was Director of Legal Services and Company Secretary for the John Lewis Partnership. She was also on the Board of the British Retail Consortium for four years to 2014.

She became Chair of the charity ActionAid UK in 2014, and in 2016 she became a member-nominated Director of The Co-op. She is an ambassador of Board Apprentice and is an Advisor to Ultra Education, working to develop young entrepreneurs. She is also a trustee of The Radcliffe Trust, one of Britain's oldest charities supporting classical music performance and training,

She chaired the diversity review conducted by CILIP in 2017 into the awarding of the Carnegie and Kate Greenaway Medals. Committed to encouraging all business leaders to promote diversity on boards, she has said: "That is the future. There is a whole slew of people who still feel that they aren't part of the game. We are a mixed society – that's what Britain has been for so long. We just need to be more positive rather than negative, and showcase it. We are now at a crossroads."

Additionally, she is the former mentor of rap artist and media entrepreneur Kelvyn Colt.

In July 2017, Casely-Hayford was named the new Chancellor of Coventry University, the first woman to hold the position. She was appointed for a second term in 2020 and stood down in 2024.

In February 2018, she was announced as the new chair of the board of Shakespeare's Globe, taking over the appointment from Michael Bichard. Casely-Hayford stood down from the role in 2024.

Following the murder of George Floyd, Casely-Hayford co-founded the Gallery of Living History.

In 2024, Casely-Hayford was named as a candidate in the running to be Chancellor of Oxford University.

In June 2024, Casely-Hayford became a Patron of the Girls' Brigade.

Margaret Casely-Hayford was appointed as a Non-Executive Director on the Department for Education Board in March 2025.

From 2026, she has been a member of the Oxford Street Development Corporation Board.

== Awards and recognition ==
In 2014, she was voted Black British Business Person of the Year at the Black British Business Awards (BBBA) founded by Melanie Eusebe.

In 2016, Casely-Hayford was awarded an honorary doctorate by Middlesex University.

She was appointed a Commander of the Order of the British Empire (CBE) in the 2018 Birthday Honours, for charitable services in the UK and abroad.

In October 2019, it was announced that Casely-Hayford would be featured in the 2020 Powerlist as one of the 100 most influential black people in the United Kingdom. The following year, Casely-Hayford was included in the 2021 edition of the Powerlist, for her contributions to the education sector.

In 2020, she was elected an Honorary Fellow of Somerville College, Oxford.

In 2021, Casely-Hayford was elected a Master of the Bench at Gray's Inn.

She was again named on the Powerlist in 2022, listed in the "Public, Third Sector & Education" category.
