= Senken Shimbun =

Japanese fashion newspaper

- Industry: Journalism, Fashion
- Founded: 1956
- Headquarters: Tokyo, Japan
- Area served: Worldwide
- Website: www.senken.co.jp

Senken Shimbun is a daily Japanese fashion newspaper, based in Tokyo, Japan.

It was founded in 1956 and has the world's largest circulation of any fashion industry newspaper. It provides news, research data and new business ideas and has a great influence over the fashion trade in Japan. Its core readership consists of people involved in the textile and fashion industries and related sectors.

Senken Shimbun regularly organizes fashion exhibitions, called JFW, which is a fashion industry exhibition, promoting the Japanese fashion industry. It helps fashion products throughout Japan to be distributed in Japan's domestic market, and also serves as a platform targeting overseas markets. Beginning in 2000, JFW-IFF, an international version of the exhibition, has been held twice a year.

In 2003, the company opened a branch office in Shanghai to better collect information from outside Japan. It has an English-language version, called The Senken, which is published quarterly.

Senken Shimbun has a daily circulation of 200,000 and is distributed through the Asahi Shimbun delivery network.
