= Ernest James Hayford =

Ghanaian physician (1858–1913)

Ernest James Hayford MD, MRCP(Eng), LRCP, BL
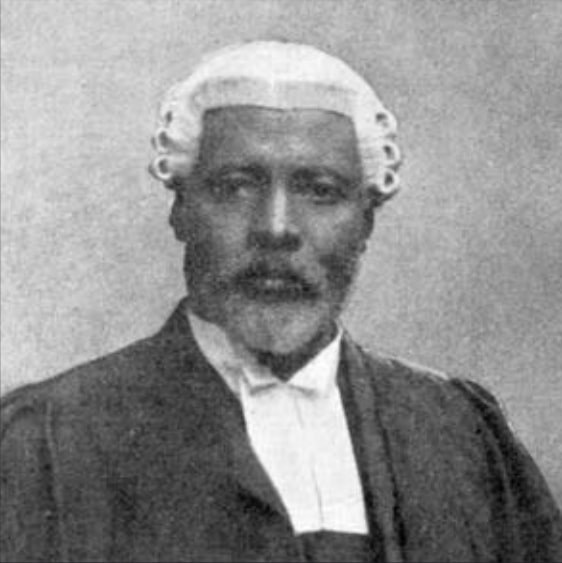
- Born: 23 April 1858; Anomabu, Gold Coast
- Died: 8 August 1913 (aged 55); London, U.K.
- Occupations: Physician and lawyer
- Parent(s): Joseph de Graft Hayford and Mary Brew
- Relatives: J. E. Casely Hayford (brother)

Ernest James Hayford, MD, MRCP(Eng), LRCP, BL (23 April 1858, Anomabu – 6 August 1913, London) was a physician and lawyer in the Gold Coast. He was the second African in the Gold Coast to become an orthodox medical doctor after Benjamin Quartey-Papafio.

== Life ==
Ernest James Hayford was the eldest son of the Rev. Joseph de Graft Hayford, a Methodist minister, and Mary Brew. J. E. Casely Hayford and Mark Christian Hayford were his younger brothers. He was educated at Anomabu in Cape Coast, and at the Wesleyan High School at Freetown, Sierra Leone.

He became an assistant missionary and head teacher at the Wesleyan Methodist church and school in Elmina, and headmaster of Cape Coast Government Boys School in 1882. After private medical study from 1882 to 1884, he studied medicine at St Thomas' Hospital in London, England, from 1884 to 1888. Specializing in gynaecology at the Rotunda Hospital in Dublin, he returned to private practice in Cape Coast.

He was an executive member of the Gold Coast Aborigines' Rights Protection Society, and his interest in politics led him to study law privately and then at Lincoln's Inn in London from 1910 to 1913. Called to the Bar in June 1913, he died in London later that summer.

Hayford married several times: there is written documentation of two marriages – to Anna Vitringa Coulon (c.1855–1912), daughter of Julius Vitringa Coulon, and Maria Hoogen (1835–1916) – and oral tradition of three other marriages. There were children from all marriages and from another relationship.
