= Gus Casely-Hayford =

British curator, historian and broadcaster (born 1964)

Gus Casely-Hayford OBE FSA
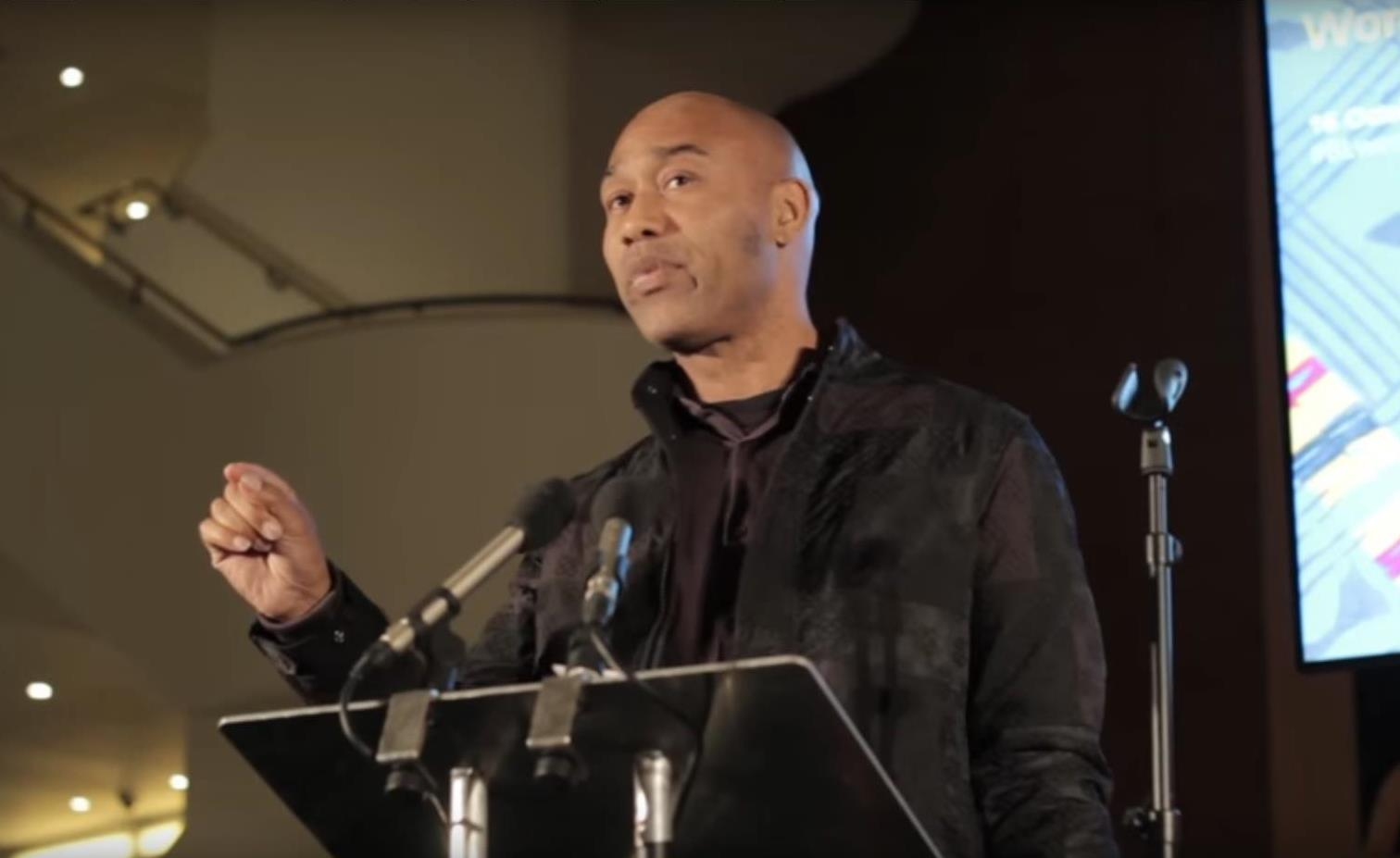
- Casely-Hayford (2015)
- Born: Augustus Lavinus Casely-Hayford; 1964 (age 61–62); Wandsworth, London, UK
- Education: SOAS University of London
- Occupations: Curator, historian, broadcaster, lecturer
- Relatives: J. E. Casely Hayford (grandfather); Joe Casely-Hayford (brother); Margaret Casely-Hayford (sister); Charlie Casely-Hayford (nephew)

Augustus Lavinus Casely-Hayford OBE FSA (born 1964) is a British curator, cultural historian, broadcaster and lecturer with ancestral Ghanaian roots in the Casely-Hayford family.

He is the director of V&A East and was formerly director of the Smithsonian National Museum of African Art in Washington, DC. He was appointed an Officer of the Order of the British Empire (OBE) in June 2018 for his services to arts and culture. and Professor of Practice at SOAS in 2021. He was commissioned to present a second TV series of Tate Walks for Sky Arts in 2017 featuring David Bailey, Helena Bonham Carter, Billy Connolly, Robert Lindsay, Jeremy Paxman and Harriet Walter. Casely-Hayford was awarded the Leader of the Year for Arts and Media by the Black British Business Awards 2017. He delivered a TED talk in August 2017. He has been awarded a cultural fellowship at King's College, London, and a fellowship at the University of London's School of Oriental and African Studies (SOAS).

In 2010, as part of the Wonderful Africa Season, he presented Lost Kingdoms of Africa, four 60-minute television programmes for BBC Two and BBC Four; in 2014, the series was broadcast by the French-speaking TV channel Histoire. He was commissioned to present a second series in February 2012. He wrote the book Lost Kingdoms of Africa in 2012, published by Bantam Press. He presented a study of William Hogarth and the 18th century for the television series The Genius of British Art, on Channel 4, in 2010 and hosted The Culture Show for BBC 2 in 2012. In 2016, Casely-Hayford presented the television series Tate Walks for Sky Arts. He is the author of a book on Timbuktu, published in 2018 by Ladybird/Penguin. Since 2022, he has hosted a reboot of the long-running archaeological television show Time Team, viewable on the Time Team Official Channel on YouTube.

== Early life ==
Born in London, England, into the prominent Ghanaian Casely-Hayford family, Gus Casely-Hayford attended the private Clayesmore School in Dorset from 1978 to 1980, and went on to gain a PhD in African History from the School of Oriental and African Studies (SOAS), University of London. His doctoral thesis was titled "A genealogical history of Cape Coast stool families".

== Career ==
He is the former executive director of Arts Strategy for Arts Council England. He was previously Director of inIVA (Institute of International Visual Art), a London-based arts organisation with a particular emphasis on international practice, which collaborates with partner venues throughout the UK and worldwide. Prior to this, he was the Director of Africa 05, the largest African arts season ever hosted in Britain, involving throughout 2005 more than 150 cultural organisations, including the BBC, the aim of which Casely-Hayford said was to create "sustainable change in the way the art world – and the public – thinks about Africa. ...We don't want this just to be about one year."

He also led the British Museum's diversity programme. He has advised the United Nations and the Canada Council, Council for Culture of the Dutch and Norwegian Arts Councils, and was commissioned to develop the future audience vision for the Tate family of galleries. In 2012, he was a Jury member of the National Open Art Competition and the National Portrait Gallery's BP Portrait Award. In 2013, he was the Chair of the Caine Prize judges. He was chair of the advisory panel for the 2015 British Library exhibition West Africa: Word, Symbol, Song and co-authored the accompanying book of the same title.

He has presented Tony Knox's award-winning South Bank Show about the "Flags of the Fante Coast", produced a documentary on Chris Ofili for Channel 4 and presented several series on African culture for BBC World Service. He has presented Brit Art – Where to Now? for BBC Four. He was a commissioner of arts for the Greater London Authority.

He lectures on world art at Sotheby's, Goldsmiths College and the University of Westminster, and is a consultant for organisations such as the United Nations, the Arts Council and the BBC. He is a Clore Fellow and is a Trustee of the National Trust, a member of English Heritage's Blue Plaque Group and a member of Tate's "Tate for All Board". He is a Judge for the Art Fund's "Museum of the Year" in 2016. He was formerly a Trustee of the National Portrait Gallery and a Council Member of Tate Britain. He also sits on the Caine Prize Council and is a spokesperson for the National Archives' Explore Your Archive programme. Casely-Hayford is a supporter of Sense International.

In 2019, he was named as the inaugural director of the forthcoming V&A East, due to open in east London in 2025, with Yinka Shonibare as an ambassador for the new museum. This museum complex in London’s Olympic Park designed to engage younger and more diverse audiences through inclusive cultural programming. In November 2025, it was announced that V&A East in London’s Olympic Park would open in April 2026 under the direction of Gus Casely-Hayford, as part of the £1.1 billion East Bank cultural district, with a focus on inclusive and diverse programming aimed at younger audiences.

In February 2022, Casely-Hayford was announced as the new presenter of the online revival of Time Team, alongside Natalie Haynes.

== Personal life ==
He is the brother of fashion designer Joe Casely-Hayford, OBE (1956–2019), and of lawyer Margaret Casely-Hayford, and (as son of Victor Casely-Hayford, an accountant who trained as a barrister) the grandson of J. E. Casely Hayford (1866–1930), the great Gold Coast thinker, writer and politician. He is married and has one daughter, and lives in London with his family.

== Awards and honours ==
- 2016: Honorary Fellowship of SOAS University of London
- 2018: Officer of the Order of the British Empire (OBE)
- 2018: Cultural Fellow King's College London
- 2022: Bencher of Inner Temple
- 2023: Honorary Professor in School of Education, Western University, Sydney, Australia
- 2023: Honorary Doctorate in Civil Law from the University of East Anglia
- 2023: Honorary Doctorate from the University of the Arts London
- 2024: Honorary Doctorate from Kingston University, London
- 2024: Fellow of the Society of Art Historians
- 2024: Fellow of the Society of Antiquaries

== Bibliography ==
- Timbuktu. London: Ladybird Books. 22 March 2018. ISBN 978-0-7181-8910-5. Illustrated by Angelo Rinaldi.
- Co-edited with Janet Topp Fargion and Marion Wallace, West Africa: Word, Symbol, Song (accompanying British Library exhibition of the same name), British Library Publishing Division, 2015. ISBN 978-0712309899.
- The Lost Kingdoms of Africa: Discovering Africa's hidden treasures, Transworld Publishers, 2012. ISBN 978-0593068144.
- A genealogical history of Cape Coast stool families. PhD Thesis. London, The School of Oriental and African Studies, 1992.
