= J. E. Casely Hayford =

Gold Coast journalist and activist (1866–1930)

J. E. Casely Hayford MBE
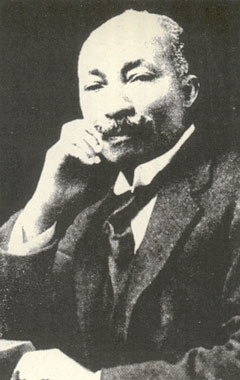
- Born: Joseph Ephraim Casely Hayford; 29 September 1866; Cape Coast, Gold Coast
- Died: 11 August 1930 (aged 63)
- Other names: Ekra-Agyeman; Casely Hayford
- Education: Wesley Boys' High School; Fourah Bay College; Inner Temple; Fitzwilliam Hall, Cambridge
- Occupations: Journalist; lawyer; educator; politician
- Notable work: Ethiopia Unbound (1911)
- Spouses: Beatrice Madeline Pinnock; Adelaide Casely-Hayford
- Children: Archie Casely-Hayford; Gladys May Casely-Hayford
- Parent(s): Joseph de Graft Hayford and Mary Ewaraba Brew
- Relatives: Ernest James Hayford (brother); Joe Casely-Hayford (grandson); Margaret Casely-Hayford, Connie Elizabeth Casely-Hayford (granddaughters); Gus Casely-Hayford (grandson)

Joseph Ephraim Casely Hayford, MBE (29 September 1866 – 11 August 1930), also known as Ekra-Agyeman, was a prominent Fante Gold Coast journalist, editor, author, lawyer, educator, and politician who supported pan-African nationalism. His 1911 novel Ethiopia Unbound is one of the earliest novels published in English by an African. He wrote mostly as Casely Hayford, using the name Casely as his first name.

== Biography ==
Joseph Ephraim Casely Hayford was born on 29 September 1866 in Cape Coast, in the British Gold Coast colony, now Ghana.

His family, part of the Fante Anona clan and descendants of a dynasty of omanhenes and okyeames, was part of the Fante coastal elite. His father, Joseph de Graft Hayford (1840–1919), was educated and ordained as a minister in the Methodist church, and was a prominent figure in Ghanaian politics. His mother, Mary de Graft Hayford, was from the Brew family, descended from the 18th-century Irish trader Richard Brew and his African "country wife", the Fante princess and daughter of Eno Baisie (Beesie) Kurentsi (known to Europeans as “John Currantee”), the Omanhene (chief) of Anomabu. Brew settled in this area about 1745 and was involved in the Transatlantic slave trade.

Casely was one of Joseph's middle names, used as his main forename; his brothers were Ernest James Hayford, a doctor, and the Reverend Mark Hayford, a minister. His descendants later adopted Casely-Hayford as a hyphenated double surname.

=== Early life ===
Hayford attended Wesley Boys' High School (now known as Mfantsipim School) in Cape Coast, and Fourah Bay College in Freetown, Sierra Leone. While in Freetown, Casely Hayford became an avid follower of Edward Wilmot Blyden, the foremost pan-African figure at the time, who edited Negro, the first explicitly pan-African journal in West Africa.

Upon returning to Ghana, Hayford became a high-school teacher. He eventually was promoted to principal at Accra Wesleyan Boys' High School. He was dismissed from his position at the school for his political activism.

In 1885, Hayford began working as a journalist for the Western Echo, which was owned by his maternal uncle James Hutton Brew. By 1888, he was the editor, and he renamed the paper as the Gold Coast Echo. From 1890 to 1896, he was co-proprietor of the Gold Coast Chronicle. He also wrote articles for the Wesleyan Methodist Times.

== Inner Temple and the bar ==
In 1893, Hayford travelled to London to study law as a non-collegiate student at the University of Cambridge, where he was admitted at Easter 1893, and then as a student of the Inns of Court School of Law. He was called to the Bar as a barrister on 17 November 1896 from the Inner Temple. That same year, he returned with his recently married first wife to Ghana to a private law practice in Cape Coast, Axim, Sekondi and Accra. He also continued his work as a journalist, editing the Gold Coast Leader. In 1904, he helped found the Mfantsipim School. In 1910, he succeeded John Mensah Sarbah as president of the Aborigines' Rights Protection Society, the first anti-colonial organisation founded in the Gold Coast.

== Political activism ==
Hayford wrote several books, primarily as commentary and opposition to land management acts issued by the colonial government, such as the Crown Lands Bill of 1897, and the Forest Ordinance of 1911. His view was that African identity and African social stability were inextricably linked to conservation of existing conventions concerning land rights.

In his 1903 book Gold Coast Native Institutions, Hayford analysed Fanti and Asante governmental institutions, and argued for a self-governing Gold Coast within a federal greater Britain.

While visiting London to protest against the Forest Ordinance of 1911, Hayford was part of a group that gave financial assistance to Dusé Mohamed Ali to get his African Times and Orient Review off the ground. Others were Francis T. Dove and C. W. Betts from Sierra Leone and Dr. Oguntola Sapara from Lagos.

Hayford was also deeply involved in the political movement for African emancipation. He corresponded with W. E. B. Du Bois, and participated in Booker T. Washington's International Conference on the Negro in 1912. Hayford's correspondence with Washington fostered the pan-African movement in both Africa and the United States.

Hayford's career in public office began in 1916 with his nomination to the Legislative Council of the Gold Coast. As a legislator, he served on various public commissions, and was appointed an MBE in the 1919 Birthday Honours for services in aid of the Prince of Wales's Patriotic Fund. In the same year, he formed West Africa's first nationalist movement, the National Congress of British West Africa, one of the earliest formal organisations working toward African emancipation from colonial rule. He represented the Congress in London in 1920, to demand constitutional reforms from the colonial secretary, and address the League of Nations Union. He was criticised for accepting inadequate concessions from the colonial authorities. While promoting an African nationalism that demanded unity and cultural awareness among Africans, Hayford advocated only constitutional political reforms within the framework of Ghana remaining a colony. He became the first patron of the West African Students' Union in 1925, and was elected as municipal member for Sekondi in September 1927. The National Congress was dissolved shortly after Hayford's death in 1930.

He published a novel entitled Ethiopia Unbound (1911), which is one of the first novels in English by an African. It has been cited as the earliest pan-African fiction. The novel is set in both Africa and England. It relies on philosophical debates between an African and his English friend, as well as references to contemporary African events and ancient African history, to provide a context for its exploration of African identity and the struggle for emancipation.

== Personal life ==
In September 1896, in England, Hayford was first married to Beatrice Madeline Pinnock. Their son, born in 1897, who later took the name Archie Casely-Hayford, also became a barrister, and was a district magistrate and the first Minister of Agriculture and Natural Resources in the First Republic of Ghana. Hayford's first wife died in 1902.

While in London studying at the Inner Temple and lodging at a hostel for African bachelors in 1893, Hayford met Adelaide Smith, a young woman of Sierra Leonean Creole origins. She returned with him to the Gold Coast in 1896 after he was called to the bar. She became a prominent writer and established a Freetown girl's vocational school. They were married in Fulham, London, in September 1903, after the death of his first wife. With Adelaide, Hayford had a daughter, Gladys May Casely-Hayford (1904–1950), who was a teacher, an artist and a poet, publishing some of her poems under the pen name of Aquah Laluah.

Through his son Archie, who created the double-barrelled surname, Casely Hayford was the progenitor of the Casely-Hayford family of Ghana and Britain. His descendants have served as part of the latter country's Black British elite.

== Bibliography ==
- The Truth About The West African Land Question (1898. Reprinted, 1913. Reprinted London: Frank Cass, 1971)
- Gold Coast Native Institutions: With Thoughts Upon A Healthy Imperial Policy for the Gold Coast and Ashanti (1903. Reprinted London: Frank Cass, 1970, ISBN 0-7146-1754-7)
- Ethiopia Unbound: Studies in Race Emancipation (1911. Reprinted London: Frank Cass, 1969, ISBN 0-7146-1753-9. Black Classic Press, with an Introduction by Molefi Kete Asante, 2011)
- Gold Coast Land Tenure and the Forest Bill (1911)
- William Waddy Harris, the West African reformer (1915)
- United West Africa (1919)
- West African Leadership: Public speeches delivered by the Honourable J. E. Casely Hayford; edited by Magnus J. Sampson (1951)
