= Beata Doreck =

German educationist (1833–1875)

Beata Doreck (1833 – 1875) was a German educator and first president of the Froebel Society who worked to bring kindergartens to Britain.

== Career ==
She was born on 5 February 1833 in Mannheim, Grand Duchy of Baden. Despite her father's opposition to her becoming a teacher, she trained for three years at the normal school at Riboville, Alsace, and received her teaching diploma in Colmar at the age of nineteen.

In 1857, she began a three-year post as a governess in England, but was unhappy with the way she was treated by her employers. In 1866 she opened her own school at 1 Kildare Terrace, Bayswater, London, which moved to 63 Kensington Gardens, Bayswater in 1869.

In June 1871, she was elected to the council of the College of Preceptors at the suggestion of Frances Buss. She and Buss proposed a scheme to the college for the creation of a professorship of the science and art of education. This post was created in January 1873, and taken by Joseph Payne. In September 1873, Doreck and Buss became the first women to be elected fellows of the college.

Doreck served as president of the Schoolmistresses’ Association for the year 1873/4.

== Kindergarten work ==
Doreck added a kindergarten to her own school, but struggled to find staff for it as the concept was little understood outside of Germany. The kindergarten system had been proposed by Friedrich Fröbel and stressed the importance of play to children's education; most English kindergartens at the time were German-speaking. In November 1874, she held a meeting at her house in Kensington Gardens to bring together British educationists who were interested in kindergarten work. The next month, Doreck was elected the first president of The Froebel Society for the Promotion of the Kindergarten System, a society which also included Buss, Payne, Eleonore Heerwart, Caroline Bishop, Emilie Michaelis, and Adelaide Manning, and was soon joined by Emily Shirreff, who succeeded Doreck as president.

She died at the Hotel Interlaken in September 1875 on a recuperative trip to Switzerland, and was pronounced to have died of overwork. A Doreck scholarship in the theory and practice of education was offered by the College of Preceptors afterwards.
