= Alice Woods (educationist) =

British educationist and college head

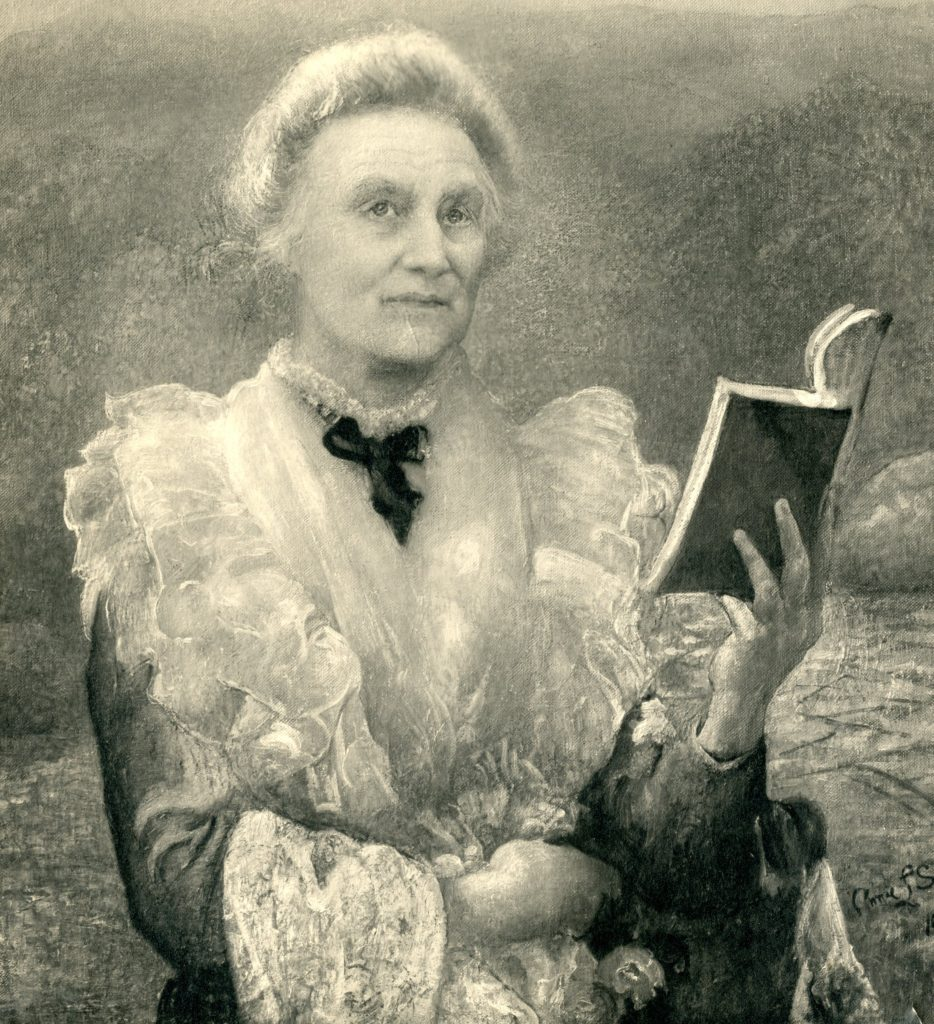
- by Annie Swynnerton
- Born: 6 August 1849; Walthamstow
- Died: 7 January 1941 (aged 91); Radlett

Alice Woods or Alice Augusta Woods (6 August 1849 – 7 January 1941) was a British educationist and college head. She was an advocate for co-education.

== Life ==
Woods was born in Walthamstow on 6 August 1849 and she was brought up as a Quaker. Her parents were Emma (born King) and Samuel Woods. Her cousin Mary Woods was a headmistress. Woods went to Girton College before joining teaching herself in Scotland for two years at St Leonards School in St Andrews.

Her first headship was at a school in Bedford Park, Chiswick. She head hunted Kindergarten expert Esther Lawrence in 1884 to lead the preparatory department of Chiswick High School. Alice became her lifelong friend - even after she left in 1893 to work with Emilie Michaelis.

In 1892, the Maria Grey Training College attracted Woods as its new head. This was the first college to train women teachers and it had just had new buildings. The college was in the same grounds as a high school. The college and high school were erected in 1892, designed by architect J. Osborne Smith, at a cost of £11,500 (£1.26 million as of 2025).

Her focus was less on administration than on raising the quality of the students’ work. The students hoping to teach in Kindergartens learnt about the teaching methods developed by Maria Montessori and Froebel, and were taught by teachers who all had their own degrees.

Woods was recognised as an expert on teaching and she was invited to speak abroad. She also served on leading committees to improve education.

Woods died in Radlett in 1941.

== Works ==
- Advance in Co-Education (1919),
- Educational Experiments in England (1920),
- George Meredith as Champion of Women and of Progressive Education (1937)
- On How to Grow Old (1940)
