= Friedrich Beust =

German soldier, revolutionary and political activist and Swiss reform pedagogue

Friedrich (von) Beust (August 9, 1817 – December 6, 1899), German soldier, revolutionary and political activist and Swiss reform pedagogue, was the son of Prussian Major Karl Alexander von Beust. Beust was born in the Odenwald, in whose great forests, as a young man, he observed Nature in her large and small aspects and collected her creatures. He learned to ride a horse in the royal stables. In 1834, he became an ensign in the 17th Prussian regiment. Under the guidance of a captain, he drew maps in his free time. He entered the division school at Düsseldorf where he was especially interested in geography, which students of Carl Ritter were teaching. He continued his studies of cartography and also science, especially anatomy. In 1845, he was ordered to Fortress Minden, where he came to the conclusion he could not fit into Prussian military discipline, bitterly resigned in 1848, and became a political activist.

In 1848 he was delegate from the Cologne Workers' Association to the Second Democratic Congress held in Berlin. At the Congress he spoke in favour of the "Demands of the Communist Party in Germany" which were written by Karl Marx and Frederick Engels. This was the Communist League's political programme for the revolution.

Beust took over the operations of the republican Neuen Kölnischen Zeitung when the previous publisher, Friedrich Annecke, was arrested for reporting on the Frankfurt Democratic Congress. Despite the efforts of Annecke's wife, Mathilde Franziska (née Giesler), the newspaper was suppressed. He got to know Ferdinand Freiligrath who was helping Frau Annecke put out the Westfälischen Jahrbuch, and who, anticipating the coming emigration which would be necessary, wrote him some letters of introduction to people in Paris. He also got to know the social democrat Karl Marx, who was putting out the Neuer Rheinischer Zeitung with Freiligrath. He took over the command of the Cologne militia, and when it interfered with the departure of Prussian troops to Düsseldorf to dissolve a regiment there, a state of siege — Belagerungszustand (in German) — was declared for Cologne and Beust's arrest was sought for high treason. At that point he emigrated to Paris. Later he was elected to the military commission for the Baden-Palatinate uprising. Beust soon saw that the chaotic leadership, among other things, would not allow the uprising to accomplish anything useful, and after the Ubstadt und Waghäusel battle, lost through ineptitude, he fled with a detachment across the Swiss border at Rheinfelden on June 15.

Beust settled in Zürich where he learned the trade of a pedagogue with the innovative teacher Meier while studying botany and chemistry at the university. He obtained an appointment at Karl (nephew of the famous Friedrich) Fröbel's school. Until 1850 another of the teachers at the school was Wilhelm Liebknecht, the Marxist founder of the Social Democratic Workers' Party of Germany (1869–1875).

At this point, he stopped using "von" when he gave his name, but he never formally renounced his claims to nobility. Seeing a return to Germany was out of the question, he joined A. Kirchner in the leadership of his establishment. In 1854 he married Anna Lipka, a cousin of Friedrich Engels. Then he founded his own school, and for the rest of his life devoted all his resources to that, and became a Swiss citizen. The school taught 25 children, and was attended by children living in Zürich and those of well-situated families in Germany. Among them was Ferdinand Fröbel, a grandson of Theodor a brother of Karl Fröbel. Emilie Michaelis, a leader of the Fröbel movement in England said of the school that it was a, 'truly remarkable institution' adding, after referring to Fröbel and Pestalozzi, that, 'this school stands alone in its complete fulfilment of these great educationists'

Beust remained active in socialist politics joining the International Workingmen's Association which became known as the First International in 1886. In 1894, Beust's son, Dr. Fritz von Beust (1856-1908), took over its direction. Beust was especially interested in the teachings of Johann Heinrich Pestalozzi and Fröbel on activities for children, and himself published works on early childhood education.

When he died, he was one of the last of the “48ers” living in exile.
