= Joyce Bishop =

English educator and headmistresses (1896–1993)

Joyce Bishop DBE
- Bishop in 1963
- Born: Margaret Joyce Bishop; 28 July 1896; Kings Norton, Worcestershire, England
- Died: 7 June 1993 (aged 96); Roehampton, London, England
- Occupation: Headteacher
- Years active: 1918–1984

Dame Margaret Joyce Bishop DBE (28 July 1896 – 7 June 1993) was an English educator who was head master of Holly Lodge High School for Girls in Smethwick from 1925 to 1935 and then of Godolphin and Latymer School for Girls in Hammersmith, West London between 1935 and 1963. She was associated with the primary school teacher training institute Froebel College, Roehampton and its associated Ibstock Place School of which she chaired the governors from 1964 to 1979. Bishop was appointed Commander of the Order of the British Empire in 1953 before being upgraded to Dame Commander of the Most Excellent Order of the British Empire ten years later.

== Early life ==
On 28 July 1896, Bishop was born at The Glen, Oxford Road, Moseley, Kings Norton, Worcestershire, Birmingham. She was the second of three children to the lacquer manufacturer and silver plating business owner Charles Benjamin Bishop and his wife, Amy Stewart, née Tindall. Bishop had an older sister. her family were of a middle-class background, and she was raised in the Christian faith. Illness halted her early education and thus she was privately educated at home until the age of nine. Bishop was then taught at Edgbaston High School, and came into contact with the working-class of Birmingham and Smethwick. In 1915, during the years of the First World War, she enrolled at Lady Margaret Hall, Oxford, where she read English. She frequently contributed to the college's dramatic productions and she gained a third-class degree in 1918 after suffering from illness during her final examinations. Bishop became a feminist at the college, seeking equal rights and opportunities for women.

== Career ==
Tutors personally recommended Bishop to The Hertfordshire and Essex High School, and she began teaching at the school in 1919. She remained at the school for the next six years, before at the age of 27, she was appointed head teacher at Holly Lodge High School for Girls in Smethwick, succeeding her sister. Bishop changed the attitudes and thoughts of those connected with the school, and nine pupils who went to the school were able to gain places at Oxbridge as well as other educational institutes within a decade. The conditions that she observed meant she became a campaigner for maintenance grants and free school dinners.

In 1935, Bishop accepted the invitation to become head teacher of the established, fee-paying Godolphin and Latymer School for Girls in Hammersmith, West London. At the school, she focused on developing strategic plans for planning and implementing projects. Bishop opted to evacuate the whole school to Newbury, Berkshire in September 1939 due to the threat of war. She eventually decided to return the school to London in July 1943. The school took on aided status following the passing of the Education Act 1944 but it remained an academic, selective school with no tuition fees.

Bishop was a member of the government working party that reported to the Ministry of Education in 1949 with wide recommendations seeking the recruitment of more women into the profession of teaching. She got involved in subsequent research to reverse the shortages caused by the decrease of unmarried graduate teachers, especially in girl's grammar schools, and the Association of Headmistresses and the Association of Assistant Mistresses was given the report in 1961.

She was chairman of the Association of Headmistresses from 1951 to 1952, delivering keynote speeches to the annual conferences that reflected her educational beliefs. Bishop was increasingly invited to sit on committees and governing bodies during this time. She served on the Secondary Schools Examinations Council, the National Advisory Council for the Training and Supply of Teachers and the University Grands Committee between 1961 and 1963 before retiring from Godolphin in 1963.

For ten years, Bishop worked as a supervisory tutor at King's College London. She argued against the Labour Party's plants to implement a comprehensive education system in 1965 and defended grammar schools and governing body's independence. The decision of Godolphin to go independent in 1976 as a result of local reorganization led Bishop to raise substantial bursuary funding for it through the Godolphin and Latymer Bursary Fund. Bishop was the United Kingdom's representative at the UNESCO conferences in Geneva and Montevideo in 1954. From 1958 until 1984, she was appointed to the governing board of the Royal Ballet School as a governor.

Bishop took a keen interest in education in the school's young pupils and was for several years associated with the primary school teacher training institute Froebel College, Roehampton and its associated Ibstock Place School, of which she became chairperson of the governors in 1964.

Froebel College's Principal Molly Brearley and Bishop obtained funding from the Leverhulme Foundation to create a short study titled Project for the Study of Educational Failure in Underprivileged Children in 1971. She and Brearley continued, in 1973, with the Froebel Nursery Research Project. They persuaded a lecturer Chris Athey to lead the work and the free nursery they had created. The project ran until 1978.

Bishop was an ardent opposer of the college amalgamating and reorganising when teacher training numbers decreased during the 1970s. She left in 1979. Bishop was also a member of the Council for Professions Supplementary to Medicine, the Television Research Committee of the Home Office, as well as the Committee of Vice Chancellors and Principals on University entrance requirements.

== Personal life ==
In the 1953 New Year Honours, Bishop was appointed Commander of the Order of the British Empire. Bishop was promoted to Dame Commander of the Most Excellent Order of the British Empire in the 1963 New Year Honours. On 7 June 1993, she died of bronchopneumonia at Queen Mary's Hospital, Roehampton. Bishop was cremated at Putney Vale Cemetery on the afternoon of 17 June 1993. On the afternoon of 4 October 1993, a memorial service was held for her in St Margaret's, Westminster.

== Legacy ==
The Bishop Centre at the Godolphin and Latymer School was named in her memory. A bromide print of Bishop taken by the photographer Walter Bird in February 1963 is held in the collection of the National Portrait Gallery, London.
