= Emilie Michaelis =

German-born pioneer of the kindergarten system in England

Emilie Louise Michaelis
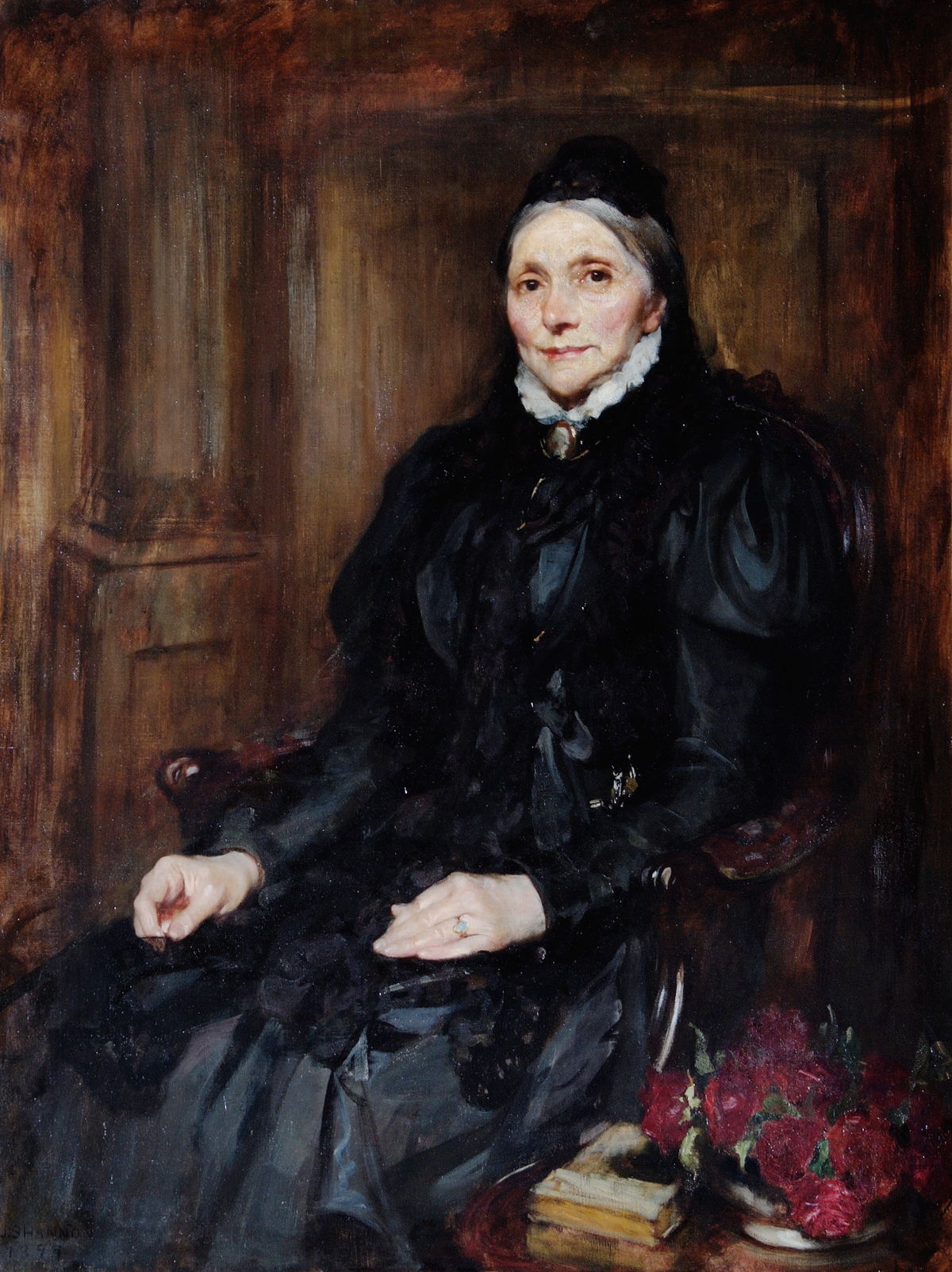
- Born: 1834; Thuringia, Kingdom of Prussia
- Died: 1904 (aged 69–70); Rotherfield, Sussex, England
- Citizenship: British
- Occupations: Teacher, educationist
- Organization: The Froebel Society (President)
- Known for: Promotion of the ideas of Friedrich Fröbel

Emilie Louise Michaelis (1834–1904) was a German-born pioneer of the kindergarten system in England, and a translator, editor, and promoter of Froebel's writings. In 1875, she started one of the first English kindergartens in Croydon, London, and later a training college for teachers, which became Froebel College. She was described as the 'chief exponent of Froebelianism in England' and coined the phrase 'nursery school' in translation from Froebel.

== Life ==
Emilie Michaelis was born in Thuringia, Kingdom of Prussia, and was a pupil of Bertha von Marenholtz-Bülow, who had herself been a student of Friedrich Fröbel.

Michaelis travelled to England in the 1870s, intending to promote the principles of kindergarten education. In 1875, she was a founding member of the Froebel Society of London, on a committee which included Emily Shirreff, Maria Georgina Grey, Frances Buss, Beata Doreck, and Adelaide Manning. She was president of the Society 1897–1900.

In 1891, Michaelis started a kindergarten and training college for kindergarten teachers in Notting Hill, which became the Froebel Educational Institute in West Kensington. The Froebel Educational Institute, on Talgarth Road, West Kensington, officially opened on 20 September 1894. Emilie Michaelis was its first principal, retiring in 1901. She was replaced as Principal by Esther Lawrence. Following Michaelis's retirement, she continued to actively promote the values of Froebelian education, lecturing and examining widely.

Emilie Michaelis died on 30 December 1904.
