= St Mary's Church, Stadtilm =

St Mary's Church
- German: St. Marien
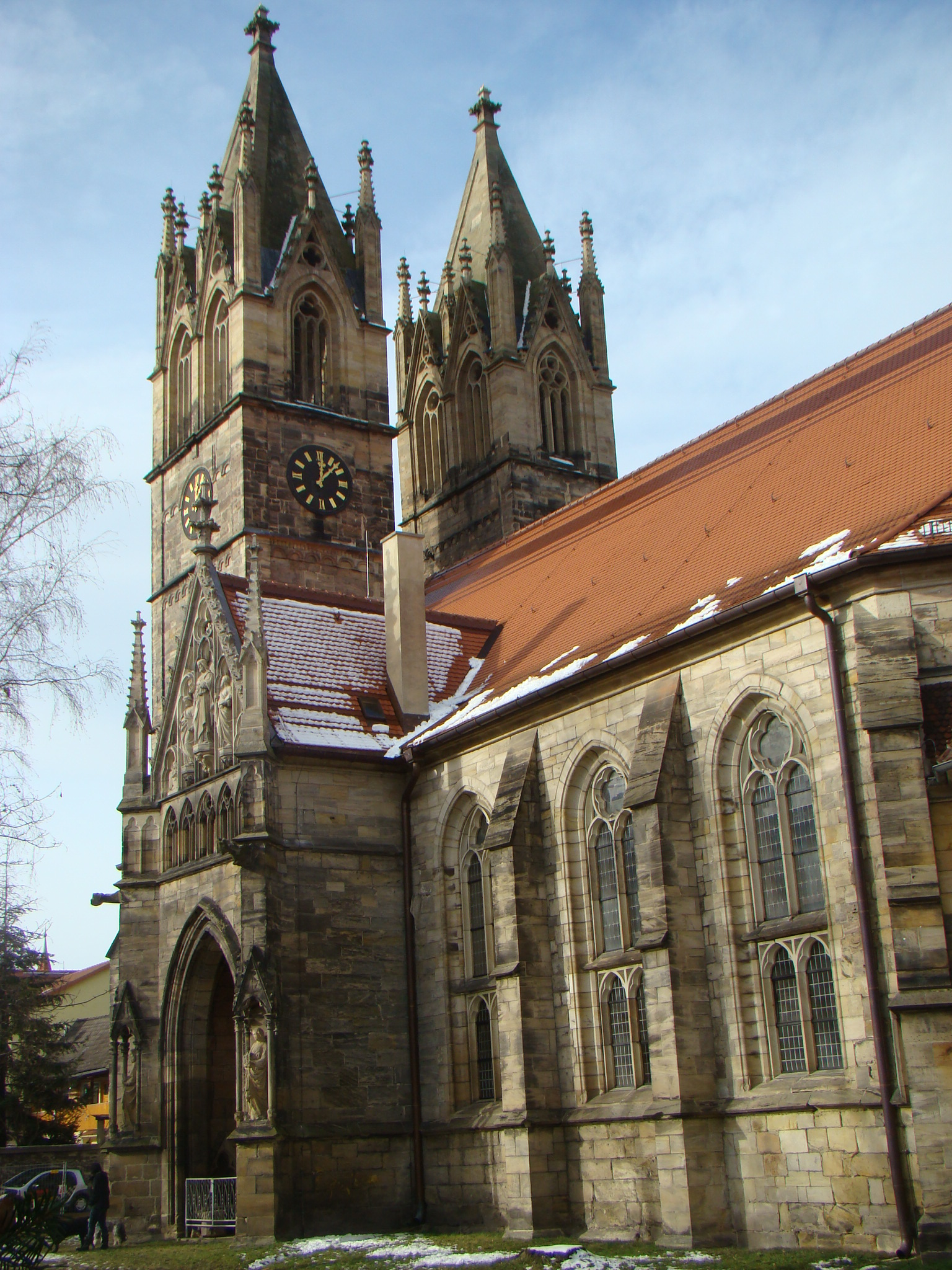

- Location within Thuringia Location within Germany
- 50.775°N 11.083°E
- Location: Johann-Sebastian-Bach-Straße; 99326 Stadtilm; Thuringia
- Country: Germany
- Language: German
- Denomination: Lutheran
- Previous denomination: Roman Catholic

History
- Status: Parish church
- Dedication: Mary, mother of Jesus
- Consecrated: 1235

Architecture
- Style: Romanesque, Gothic; Late Baroque (interior)
- Years built: 12th to 14th century

St Mary's Church (German: St. Marien) in the town of Stadtilm in Thuringia, Germany, is a Romanesque-Gothic church building and the landmark of the town. St Mary's Church is situated to the east of the market, separated by a row of houses. Its twin towers are 42 metres (138 ft) high and bear 2-metre-wide (6 ft 7 in) clock faces; the ringing has three bronze bells. Today, St Mary's Church is a Lutheran parish church; the parish belongs to the Arnstadt-Ilmenau district of the Evangelical Church in Central Germany.

== History ==
Construction work on the church began in the first half of the 12th century; it was consecrated in 1235 by Bishop Wilhelm von Havelberg. In 1533, the church adopted the Reformation.

On 1 August 1780, the church was considerably damaged by a town fire. Only the outer walls and the burnt-out towers remained. During the following nine years, the interior of the church was repaired in late-Baroque style. Still part of the original structure are the two-towered west façade, the straight chancel end as well as the north and south portals of the nave with their porches. After 1784, a radical change was made to the east section, whereby the eastern enclosing wall was demolished and a connecting wall was inserted at an obtuse angle to the choir, simplifying the shape of the nave and choir and providing both with lower outer walls and a gable roof. Inside, the nave and choir were given wooden ceilings and a new internal decoration. The altarpiece with Corinthian columns and pilaster arrangement as well as the organ case were renewed.

In the course of a historicist general renovation from 1899 to 1903 which intended to re-introduce Gothic forms of style, the south tower was equipped with a staircase. The wooden bridge which connected the towers at the height of the fifth storeys had become superfluous and was dismantled; nevertheless, together with the two towers, it has been preserved as the landmark of Stadtilm in the town's coat of arms. The pipes in the organ's front façade, which were melted down during the war, are still missing today; the gaps were filled with carvings. In 1947, work to repair the war damage began and was not nearly completed until 1984 when the church was reconsecrated. Among others, the German Foundation for Monument Protection supported the funding of renovation work to preserve the town church, for example on the south-west tower and nave.

== Architecture ==
=== Building ===
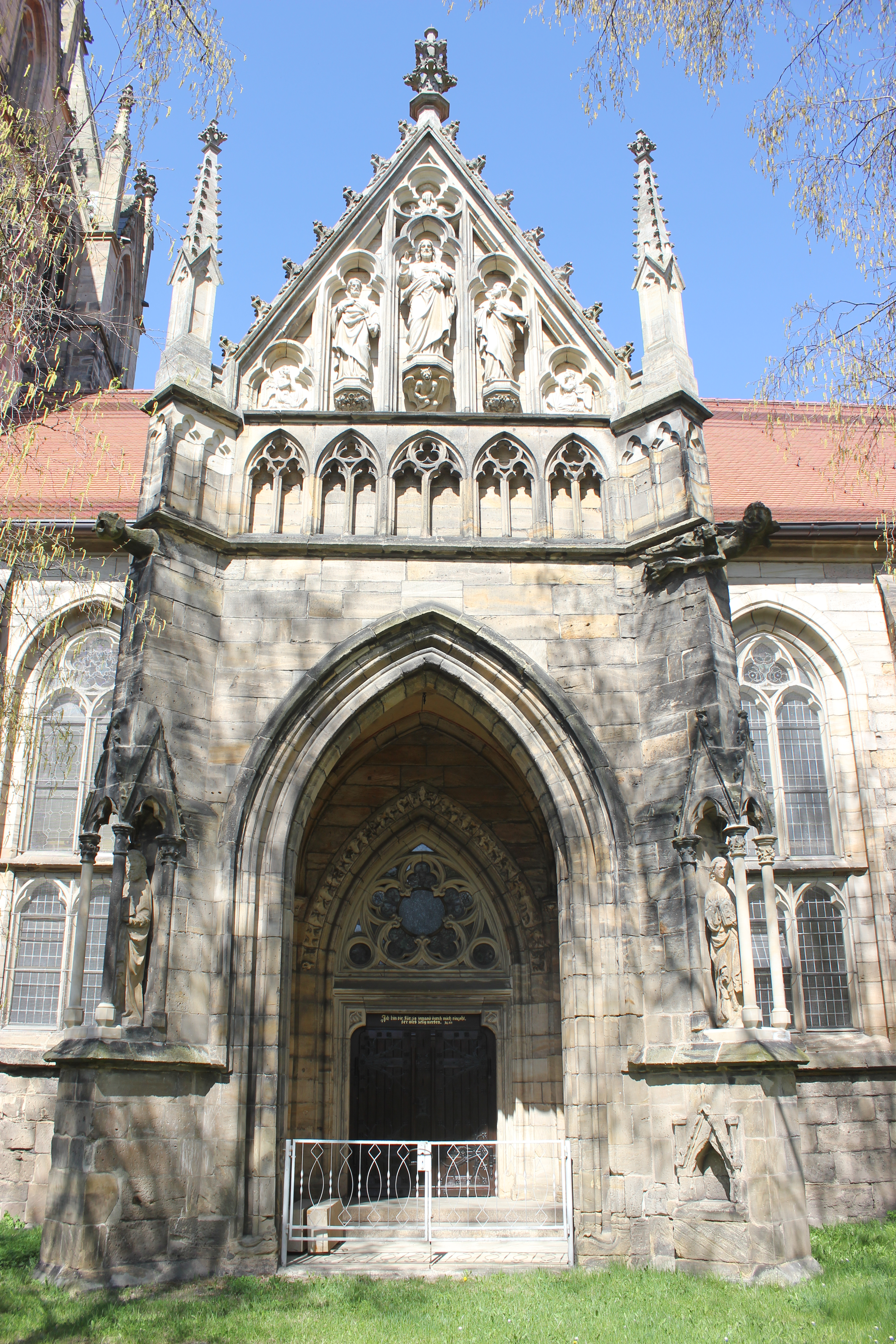
South portal

The architecture of St Mary's Church in Stadtilm combines elements of both the Romanesque and the Gothic style.

The massive double tower façade dominating the building was erected in several construction phases. The ground floor has a round-arched columned portal in the style of the Cistercian churches and shows on both sides of the stepped vaulting each three columns on bases with corner leaves and early-Gothic bud capitals on the right and tendril capitals on the left from the time after 1220.

The upper storeys of the towers date from the middle of the 14th century and show a storey division by double round-arched frieze and cornice, framed by vertically accentuating corner pilasters. The elaborately designed windows are partly trefoil-shaped with inserted small pillars and corner columns. The top storey was completed in the late 14th century and has three-light traceried windows on all sides, crowned by soaring wimpergs, as well as pinnacles at the tower corners. Both towers are finished with pyramidal stone spires and cross-flower finials.

The nave ends in a recessed choir and has lancet window panels with pairs of trefoil-shaped windows, one above the other, on the sides between buttresses; the three choir windows have been restored in simplified forms. The southern portal vestibule dates from around 1320. It has a pointed-arched gallery in front of the wall below its eaves and, above it, a gable from 1902 with a group of figures by Ernst Paul (1856–1931); next to the Saviour, the Evangelists Mark and Luke as well as two angel figures are depicted. In the tabernacles of the buttresses are statues of the apostles, which are stylistically related to those of the triangular portal at Erfurt Cathedral. The younger northern vestibule has two bays and a cross-ribbed vault. It opens to the north through a pointed arch and shows five blind niches on each of its inner walls with foliage consoles on the wimpergs; the two figures resemble those of the south portal. On the tower vaults, a late-Romanesque mural painting with biblical scenes (Sacrifice of Isaac, Christ as Judge of the World, Last Judgment, Mary with the Child, Assumption of Mary into Heaven and Saint Francis of Assisi) has been preserved.

=== Interior ===
Today, the nave is a low flat-roofed hall, whose central area is raised by the gallery supports. The choir and nave are separated by a barrier. The broad late-Baroque altarpiece was created in 1788. The organ is a work by Adam Eifert (1841–1910) from 1903; it has 32 stops on three manuals and pedal, the key and stop actions are pneumatic.

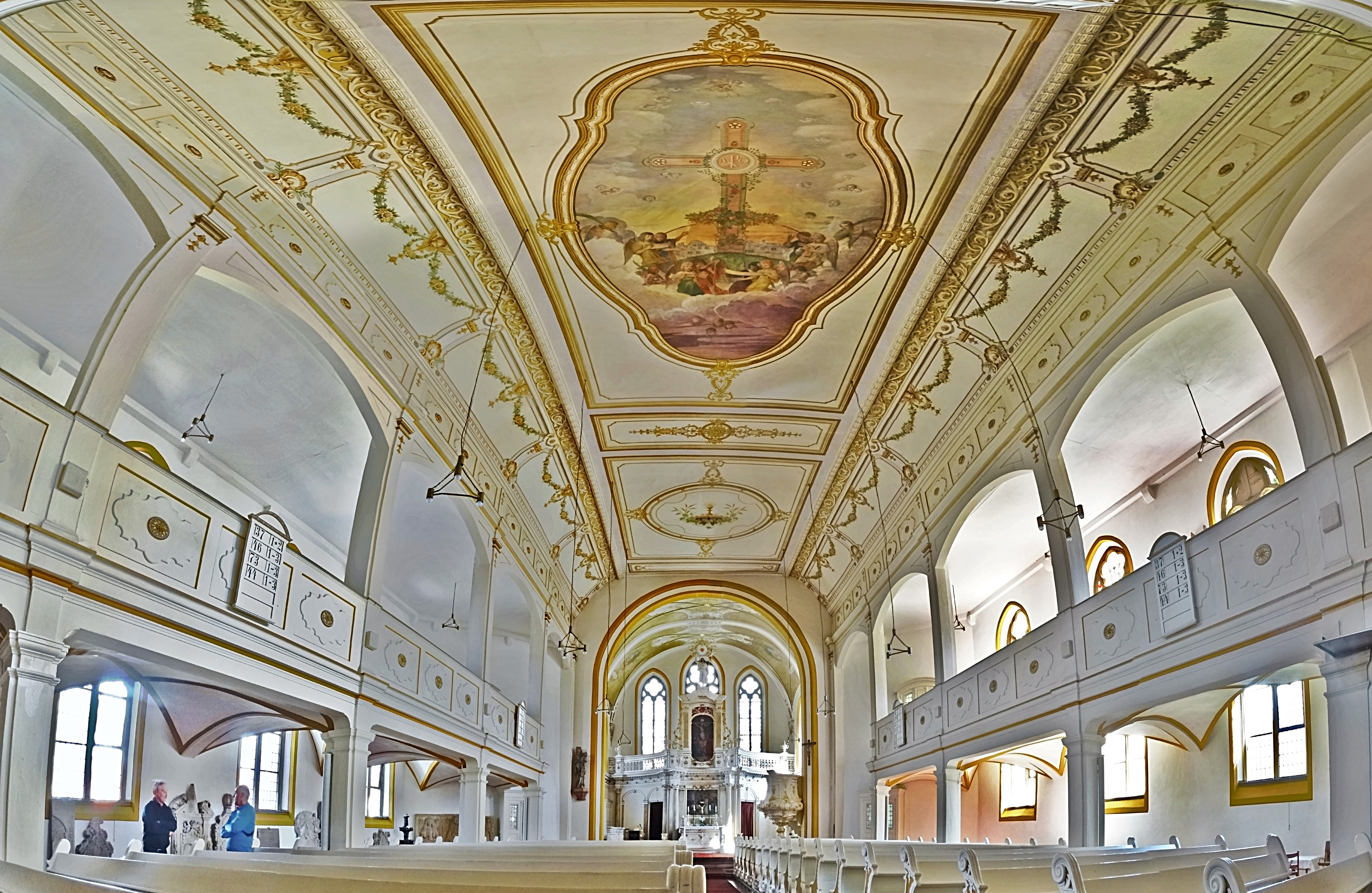
View to the east

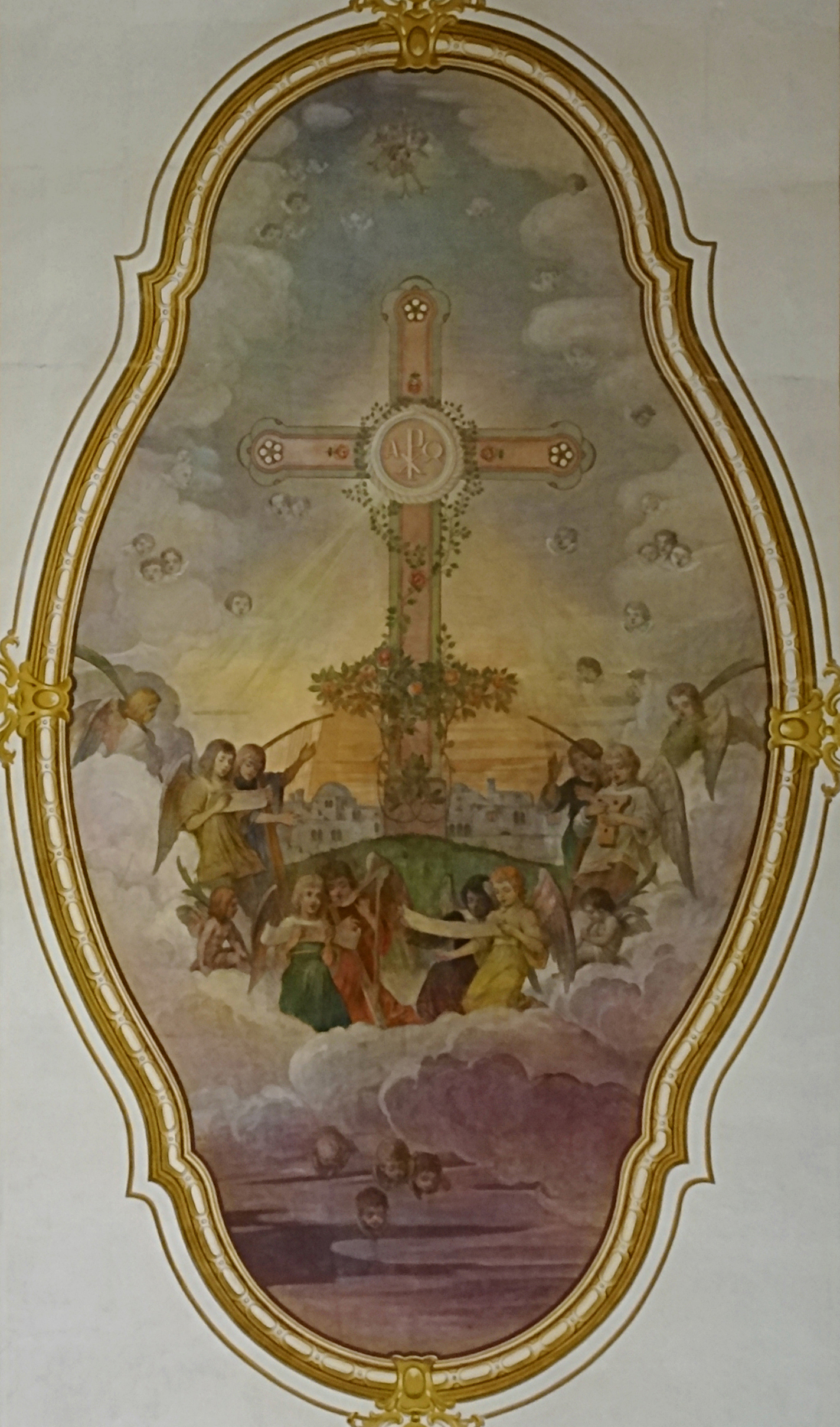
Ceiling painting

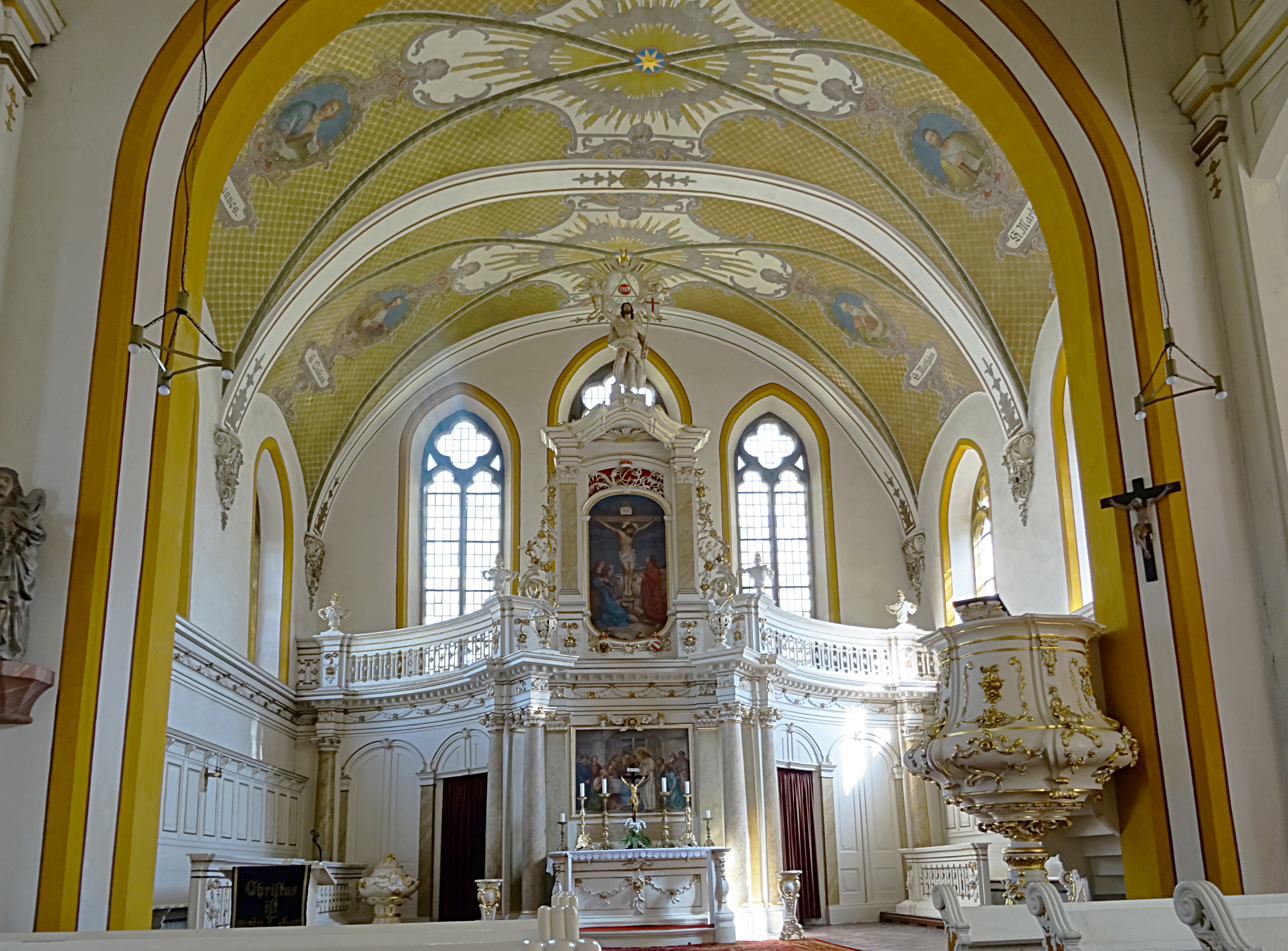
Choir

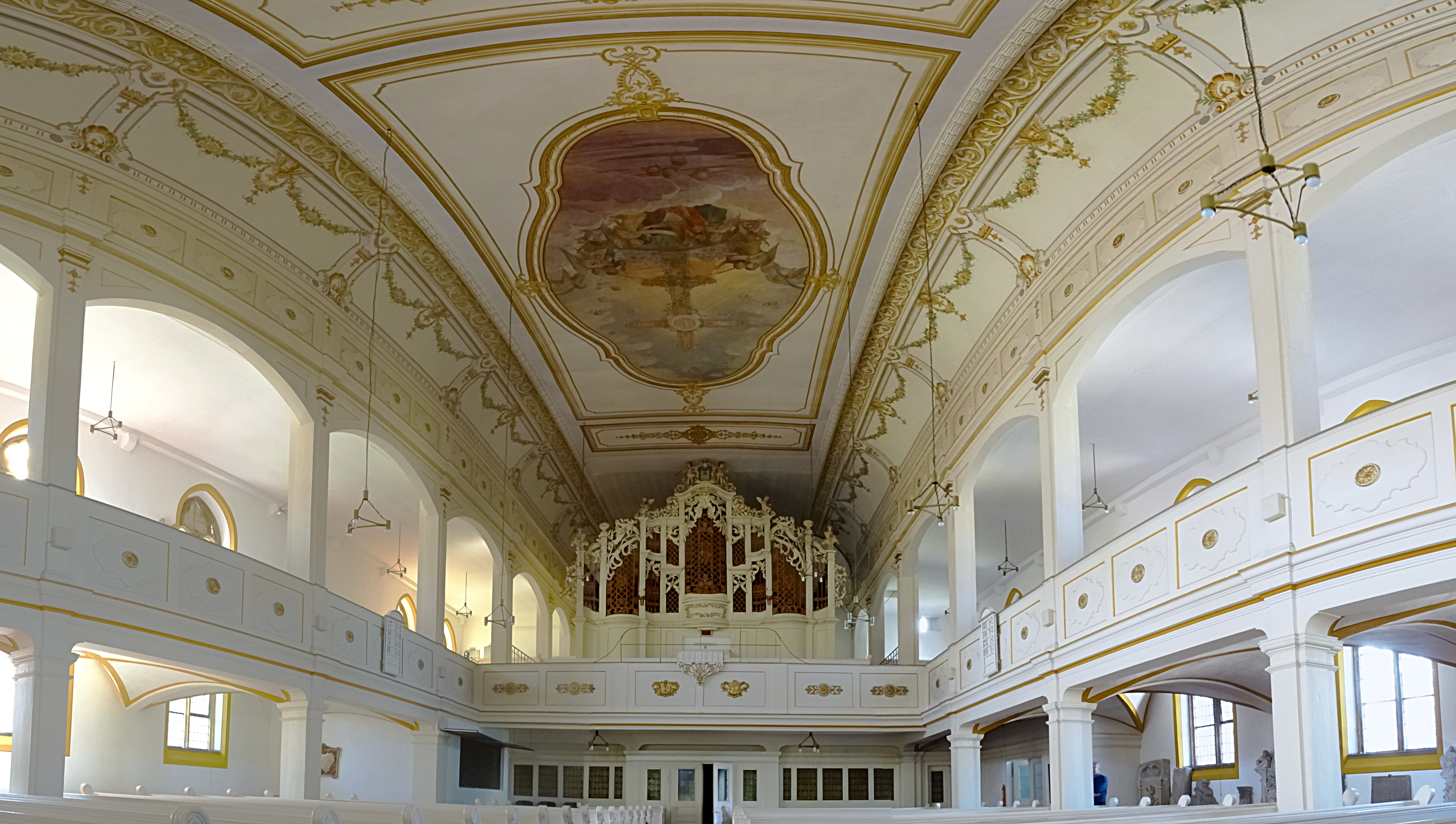
View to the west

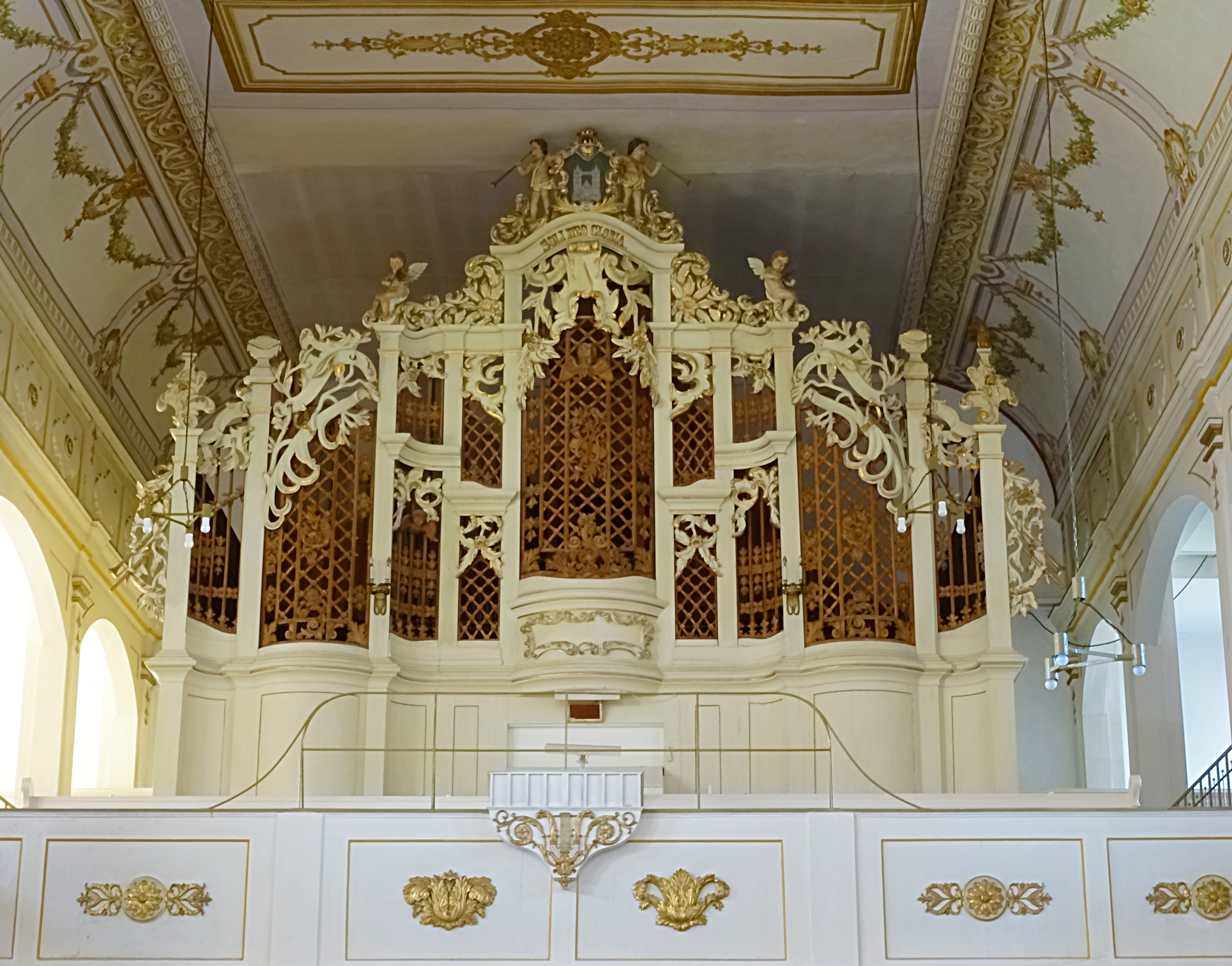
Organ

== Bibliography ==
- Dehio, Georg (1998). Handbuch der deutschen Kunstdenkmäler. Thüringen (in German) (1st ed.). München/Berlin: Deutscher Kunstverlag. pp. 1176–1177. ISBN 3-422-03050-6.
