= Ibstock Place School =

Private school in Roehampton, London

Location
- Clarence Lane; Roehampton, London, SW15 5PY; England; 51.45454°N 0.25241°W

Information
- Type: Private day school
- Established: 20 September 1894; 132 years ago
- Gender: Mixed
- Age: 4 to 18
- Houses: Brearley; Findlay; Montefiore; Paget
- Alumni: Stocks
- Website: www.ibstockplaceschool.co.uk

Ibstock Place School is a private co-educational day school for pupils aged 4–18 located in Roehampton, southwest London. It was founded as the Froebel Demonstration School due to its affiliation with the Froebel Institute and adherence to Froebelian pedagogy. Ibstock Place's campus sits on a ten-acre property at the edge of Richmond Park in Southwest London.

== History ==
=== 20th century ===
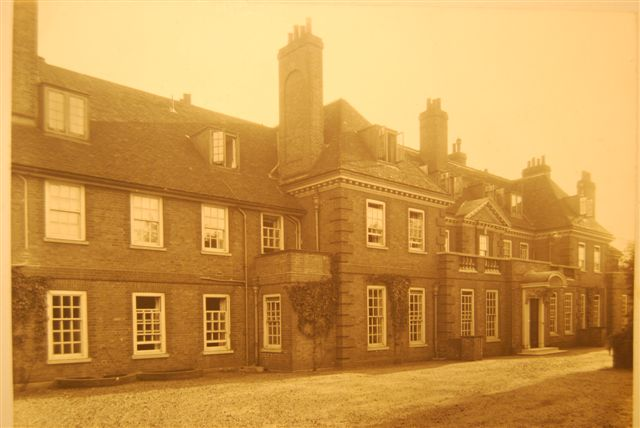
Froebel Demonstration School's Main House in the 1930s

Froebelian pedagogy was considered radical due to its emphasis on the educational experiences of young children. Nonetheless, the principles impressed Julie Schwabe, who spearheaded the opening of a teacher's training college and a demonstration school in England. Schwabe believed that Froebel's principles were crucial to social progress and had her friend Claude Montefiore appointed secretary of the inaugural Froebel Society. The Froebel Demonstration School officially opened on 20 September 1894 in West Kensington and its opening was acknowledged by Empress Frederick on 5 March 1896. Esther Lawrence served as the first headmistress and oversaw six pupils.

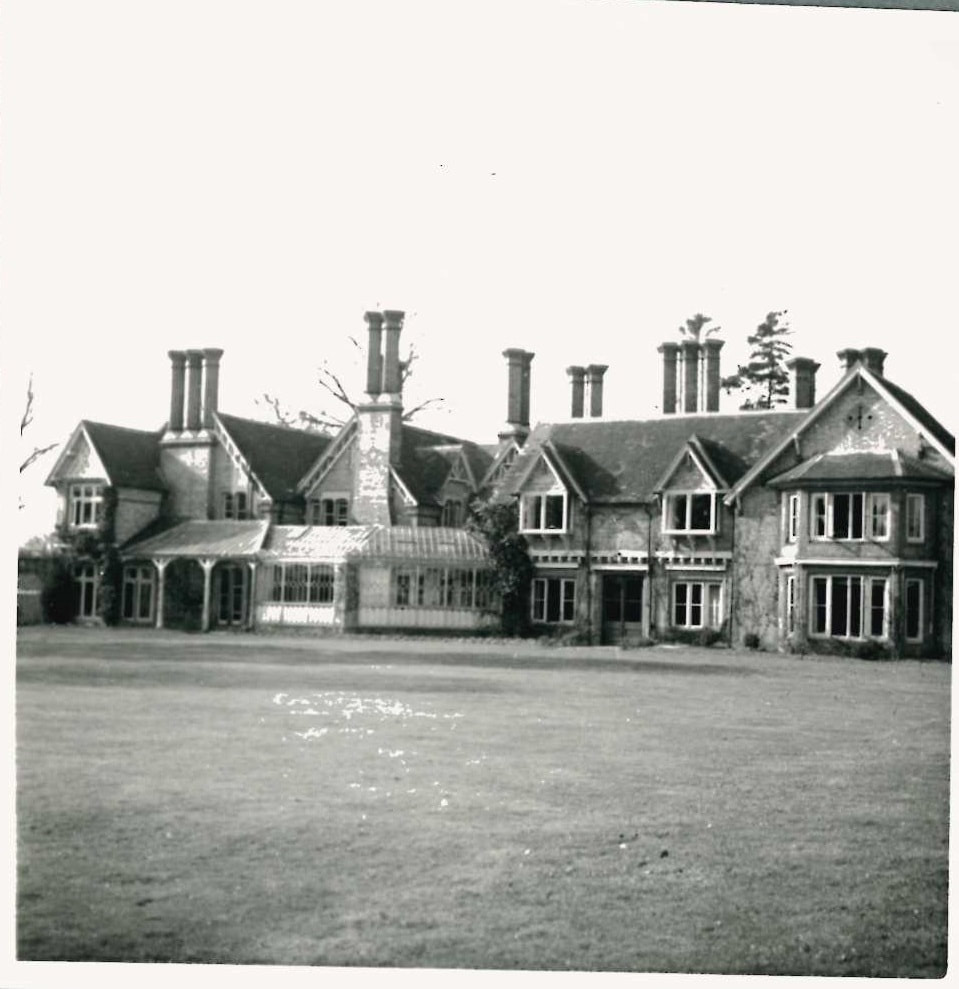
Froebel Demonstration School at Dennison House, 1930s

The Froebel Education College moved to Grove House in Roehampton in 1922, while the Incorporated Froebel Educational Institute moved to the Templeton area in London.

At the outbreak of World War II, Headmistress Barbara Priestman evacuated pupils and staff from London. Priestman had scouted several potential locations for the school to settle temporarily before deciding on a house in Little Gaddesden, Hertfordshire. In a letter about the relocation, Priestman described the Dennison House as newly renovated and redecorated and large enough to comfortably fit staff and students. It had main water and electricity, central heating, and a view overlooking Ashridge Park from atop the Chiltern Hills. She successfully persuaded school governors, and several staff and fifty pupils relocated in September 1939. Froebel Demonstration School became a boarding school out of necessity.

In summer 1945, Froebel Demonstration School purchased the Ibstock Place House in Roehampton from the Paget family, who had owned it since 1925 and named it after their ancestral home in Ibstock. The family, who included Mamaine Paget and her twin sister Celia, relocated to Oxfordshire in 1939 to wait out the wa and the house was requisitioned by the Ministry of Supply (MoS) in 1942. The MoS remained on the grounds, even as the date of the school's move approached. It was not until the Froebel Institute approached the Putney MP with a request to intercede that the MoS withdrew. However, even when the school moved onto the grounds and reopened in October 1946, the MoS was still residually present in makeshift huts until 1947. After the MoS vacated, these huts were designated for school use as a dining room, library, and additional classrooms. The name Ibstock Place School was taken on at this time.

Ibstock Place was built in the 1910s by Frank Chesterton. Millicent Dawes, Duchess of Sutherland, purchased the property in 1913 and made modifications, adding a vestibule between the wings of the H-shaped house, a two-storey addition including a ballroom and grand bedroom on the west side of the building, and an extended servants' quarters on the east side. She sold the property to the Pagets after becoming involved in the war efforts in France in 1925. The Froebel Education College was across the road.

The Ibstock Place campus underwent a number of developments in the 1950s, starting with the erection of the Long Corridor's classrooms. A gymnasium was added in 1964 and a dining room in 1968. The school continued to board students aged 5–12 until September 1977, when the school's age extension merited its closure. The age extension, which had been under consideration by the Governors since 1968, allowed admittance of students aged 13 and older. Due to increased enrolment, the boarding school was shuttered. Though some parents heartily supported the age extension, as it was no longer requisite to find a new school for their older children, others raised concerns. The main concern was that the Froebelian pedagogy would not be effective when teaching older students as it had been constructed to support younger children. Despite this, students could then remain at Ibstock Place up to their O levels.

In 1984, the school installed its first computers and a computer course was offered to Year 10 pupils. These were, however, destroyed in a fire the same year, decimating Priestman House where the class was held. The building was rebuilt and reopened in 1986. Enrolment continued to grow and an additional building for prep school pupils, Macleod House, was erected in 1988. Additional space in the Lodge and Main House was also dedicated to these students. The first school minibus was purchased in 1989; the ballroom in the Main House was converted into a library in 1991; the FSTC Building opened in 1992; a new sports pavilion opened in 1995; Roberts Hall was completed and opened in 1998; and an extension was added to the dining room to house a conservatory in 1999.

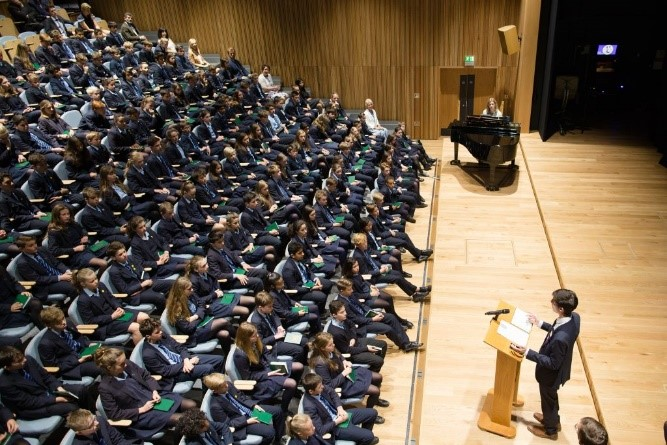
Internal Theatre - Ibstock Place School

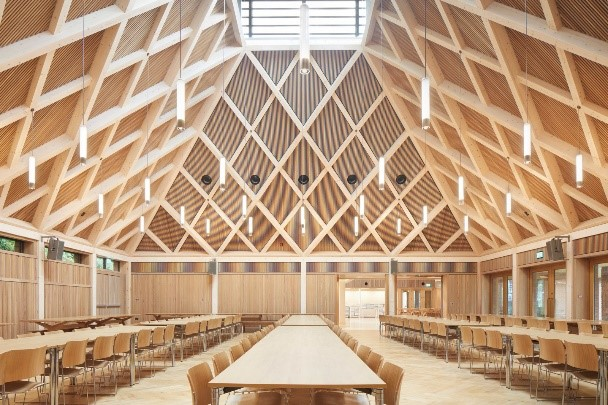
Refectory internal, Ibstock Place School 2021

=== 21st century ===
School enrolment reached 603 students by September 2000. Another age extension was established in 2005 and a Sixth Form was added, extending the accommodated age to 18 years. While the Senior School was added in the 1970s following the age extension to 16, it wasn't until 2005 that it was truly developed. Available clubs include 3-D printing, beekeeping, investing, the equality society, theatre productions, and sport in Richmond Park. 55% of pupils take instrument lessons. The Senior School enrols around 800 pupils; it is currently nearly a 50/50 split between girls and boys. The Sixth Form alone is made up of 180 students. Class sizes in 2024 ranged from 14 to 24 students. Around 85% of pupils from the prep school continue into the Senior School.

Projects overseen by Barnsley Hewitt and Mallinsons Architects included a new sports hall, opened in 2008; the New School, with a new library and classrooms, opened in 2011; and the Performing Arts Centre, opened in 2015. The Performing Arts Centre's main auditorium seats 300 people and contains a raised stage, a scenery workshop, and a 100-seat drama studio. The building also houses bathrooms, two bars, function rooms, offices, and changing rooms. The slope on which the centre was built presented challenges for the architecture firm but "gave rise to an exciting and luxurious set of internal and external spaces." Construction was still a success and has since hosted activities including plays, pantomimes, National Theatre Live, BBC Question Time, and guest lecturers. The Refectory, completed by Maccreanor Lavington and opened in 2020, includes a Great Hall, Small Hall, mezzanine, and a Sixth Form study centre. The design included laminated lattice, vaulted ceilings, and contrasting bronze handrails, door rails, and lights.

== Recent years ==
More than 1050 pupils from kindergarten to Year 13 attend Ibstock Place. The Good Schools Guide praised the school's academic rigor, esports and Innovation Centre, writing in 2021: "If you want an easy academic option, this ain't it." In 2021–22, school fees ranged from £21,492 to £27,465 annually. The school curriculum still focuses on Froebelian philosophies of child-centred learning. The three main characteristics are: playing and exploring; active learning; and creative and thinking critically. Kindergarteners are gradually exposed to more teacher-led activities to help prepare them for more formal learning in Year 1.

Ibstock Place is a member of the Headmasters' and Headmistresses' Conference.

== Headmasters and Headmistresses ==
Name	Years as Head	Ref
Esther Lawrence	1894-1898	
Boys-Smith and Hope-Wallace	1898-1899	
Grace Lucknow	1899-1900	
Annie Yelland	1900-1916	
Wigg	1916-1918	
Ethel Bain	1918-1933	
Barbara Priestman	1933-1958	
Sheila Macleod	1958-1974	
Clifford Green	1974-1981	
Aidan Warlow	1980-1984	
Franciska Bayliss	1984-2000	
Anna Sylvester-Johnson	2000-2020	
Christopher Wolsey	2021–present	

== Notable alumni ==
- Iris Murdoch (1919–1999), Irish-British novelist and philosopher
- Mary Berry (b. 1935), English food writer, chef, baker, and presenter
- Nigella Lawson (b. 1960), English food writer, chef, baker and television cook
- Nadhim Zahawi (b. 1967), British politician
- Jesse Wood (b. 1976), British musician
- Emily Blunt (b. 1983), British actress
- Daisy Dunn (b. 1987), English author and classicist
- Beatie Wolfe (b. 1988), English artist and musician
- Martha Hunt (b. 1989), American model
- Georgia May Jagger (b. 1992), British-American model and designer
- Suki Waterhouse (b. 1992), English model, actress, and singer
- Elliot Thompson (b. 1992), British athlete
- Tilly Ramsay (b. 2001), British Television presenter, cook, and influencer
