= Hastings Musical Festival =

Annual England festival

- Venue: White Rock Theatre
- Locations: Hastings, East Sussex
- Country: England
- Website: http://www.hastingsmusicalfestival.org.uk

Hastings Musical Festival is an annual festival of the performing arts held in the White Rock Theatre, Hastings, England.

== History ==
The Festival has been running since the early 1900s, when Dr Herman Brearley organised a festival "for the encouragement of choral singing". Brearley was a local music teacher who lived at "Rosebank", Priory Avenue, where he taught piano, singing, organ, harmony, theory of music and composition and is one of the few (if not the only) Festival held in a theatre.

The festival normally occupies three weeks in early March and occupies the whole of the White Rock Theatre.

Petula Clark became the festival's president in 2010.

== Categories ==
There are four main categories for entries:

- Singing
- Instrumental
- Dancing
- Speech and Drama

There is a prizewinners' concert toward the end of the Festival.

The Festival is a member of the Federation of Festivals and a qualifying Festival for the All England Dance.

== Grants ==
Every year the Hastings Musical Festival, which is a registered charity, distributes substantial sums to aspiring performers that meet the approval of the Judges and Executive committee and have applied for a grant. Funds for these awards come from the following trusts;

John Lockey Memorial Scholarship
Founded in 1935 as a memorial to John Lockey, who was the Secretary of the Hastings Musical Festival for the first 33 years of its existence.
Isabel Blackman Award
Founded in 1966
W. H. Dyer Award
Founded in 1980 as a memorial to W. H. Dyer, Chairman for 12 years and associated with the Festival for more than 50 years.
Avril Parry Prize Bursary
Founded by the President in 2005.

Judges often include household names in the performing arts.
