= Herman Brearley =

English cathedral organist

Herman Brearley CBE
- Born: Batley, Yorkshire, England
- Died: 1940
- Occupation: Cathedral organist
- Spouse: Mabel Daisy Root
- Children: 3, incl. Molly Brearley

Herman Brearley (died 1940) was an English cathedral organist, who served in Blackburn Cathedral.

== Background ==
Herman Brearley was born in Batley, Yorkshire. In 1905, he and his wife lived in Hastings.

He was a chorister and then assistant organist at Lichfield Cathedral.

He was appointed Conductor of the Preston Choral Society in 1918, and conductor of the Blackburn Philharmonic Choral Society in 1922. He was also the Conductor of the Meistersingers Society, the Northrop Male Voice Choir and the Grammar School Society.

He was the Organist and Master of the Choristers at Blackburn Cathedral from 1916 to 1939, the second longest holder of this position.

He was also Blackburn Borough organist, the first holder of the post, 1922 - 1930. His family moved to Blackburn in 1924.

He was also Music Master at Queen Elizabeth's Grammar School, Blackburn.

In 1935, he became teacher of singing, sight-singing and musical dictation at the Royal Manchester College of Music.

In 1937, he succeeded Harold Dawber as Chorus Master of the Hallé Choir.

He composed a setting of God Be In My Head which is still sung at Blackburn Cathedral, and Liverpool Cathedral.

== Private life ==
He married Mabel Daisy Root (1880–1962), who was a pianist and piano teacher. They had three children including Molly Brearley, who led the Froebel Educational Institute from 1955 to 1970.

== Career ==
Assistant Organist of:

- Lichfield Cathedral, ?–1895

Organist of:

- Halstead Parish Church, Essex, 1895–1901
- Holy Trinity, Hastings, 1901–????
- All Saints, Hastings, ?–1916
- Blackburn Cathedral, 1916–1939

Cultural offices
Preceded by Charles Hylton Stewart	Organist and Master of the Choristers of Blackburn Cathedral; 1916–1939	Succeeded by Thomas Lucas Duerden
