= Thomas Lucas Duerden =

English cathedral organist

Thomas Lucas Duerden (1898–1969) was an English cathedral organist, who served in Blackburn Cathedral.

== Background ==
Thomas Lucas Duerden was born in Blackburn in 1898.

He served in the Royal Navy towards the end of World War I.

He was music master of Hutton Grammar School, Preston 1932 to 1947, and Queen Elizabeth's Grammar School, Blackburn, 1938 to 1963.

He was awarded a Fellowship of the Royal School of Church Music in 1964.

== Career ==
Organist of:

- St. John's Church, Blackburn, 1919–1939
- Blackburn Cathedral, 1939–1964

Cultural offices
Preceded by Herman Brearley	Organist and Master of the Choristers of Blackburn Cathedral; 1939–1964	Succeeded by John Bertalot
