= White Rock Theatre =

Coordinates: 50.853733°N 0.572251°E

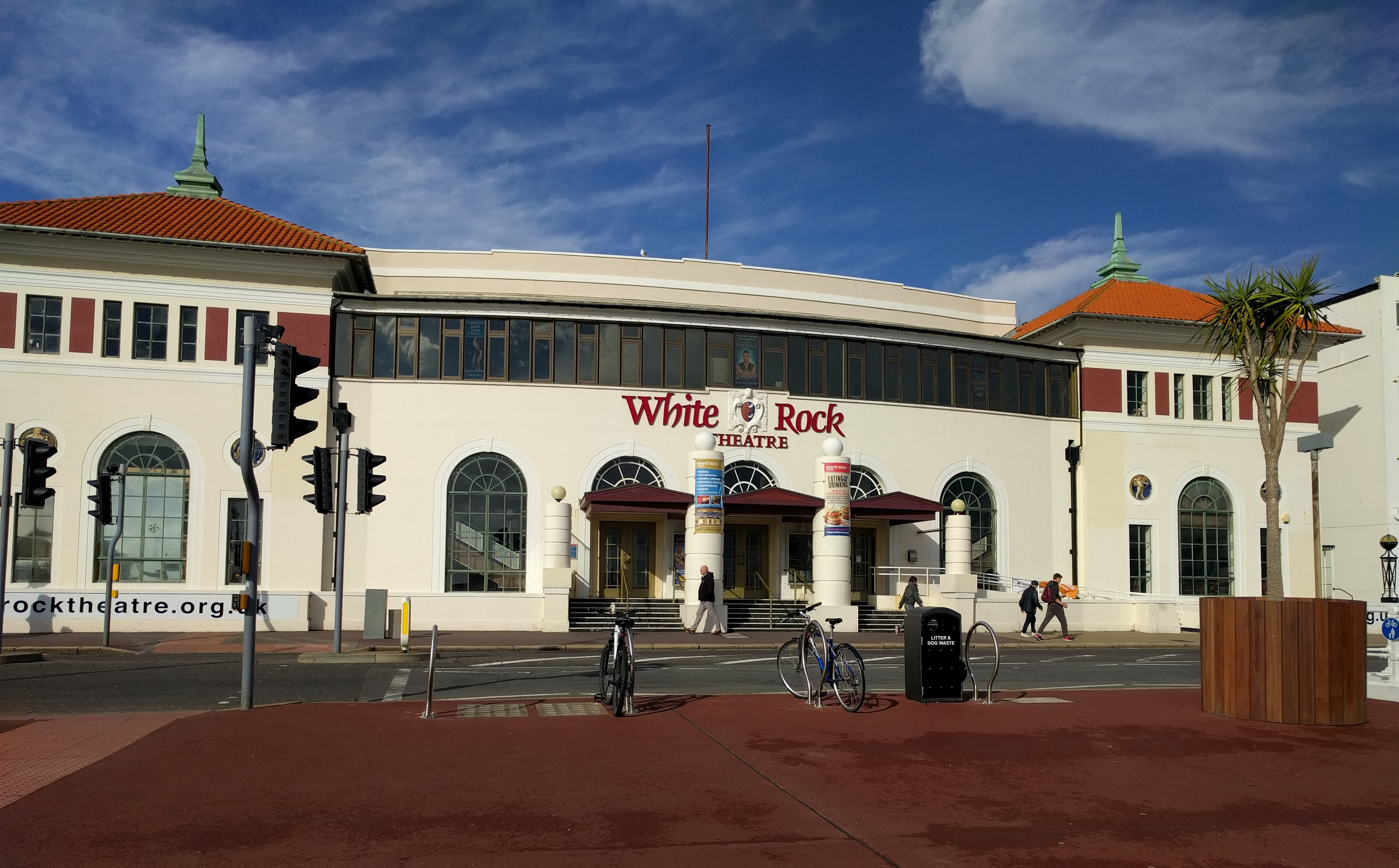
- Interactive map of White Rock Theatre
- Address: White Rock; Hastings, East Sussex; England
- Owner: Guildhall Trust (in partnership with Hastings Borough Council)
- Capacity: 1066 seated or 1670 standing/seated

Construction
- Opened: April 1927

Website
- www.whiterocktheatre.org.uk

White Rock Theatre is a medium-scale receiving house venue owned by Hastings Borough Council situated on the seafront of Hastings, East Sussex, on the south coast of England. It currently presents a varied programme of touring shows including opera, ballet, musicals, the Hastings Musical Festival and children's shows.

== History ==
The original East Sussex Hospital was replaced with the White Rock Pavilion which was opened by Edward, Prince of Wales in April 1927. It was built for the Hastings Municipal Orchestra. The pavilion underwent a further re-modification in 1939, when along with an electrical/electronics and acoustics upgrade, the seats were modified to be of the cinema 'folding' type and again in 1985 when it was renamed the White Rock Theatre.

The auditorium is split on two levels – The Stalls and The Circle with an overall capacity of 1082 seats or 1620 for standing/seated events. The Stalls is also split into flat and raked seating areas. The stage is 47 feet (14 m) wide and 31.6 feet (9.6 m) deep, with a 1/28 rake.

The seating capacity used to be 1066 (after the Battle of Hastings, but in early 2019 the capacity and layout was increased to allow more flexibility to the venue.

From its very beginning Hastings Borough Council ran the Theatre. As the years went by and the Theatre continued to run at a loss, the council decided to close the Theatre down. This announcement was met with the fierce opposition from local people and groups rallied round in support of the White Rock. In May 2002 Clear Channel Entertainment, a huge American organisation, took over management of the venue. In December 2005 Clear Channel Entertainment was spun off from the main body of Clear Channel and became Live Nation.

On February 1, 2009, HQ Theatres took over as operator of the White Rock in partnership with Hastings Borough Council. In March 2021, White Rock Theatre came under the control of Trafalgar Entertainment as part of their acquisition of HQ Theatres.

As of February 1, 2024, The Guildhall Trust took over the White Rock from Trafalgar Theatres (formerly HQ Theatres) and continues to operate it alongside Portsmouth Guildhall.

== Performances ==
The Theatre has seen a selection of entertainment over the years including Motörhead, Russell Brand, Hot Chocolate, Eartha Kitt, Al Murray, Geri Halliwell, Jools Holland, Derren Brown, Ricky Tomlinson, Tim Vine and Greg Davies. It also hosts an annual pantomime.

== Current activity ==
The venue houses a Café, the Stalls bar and the Circle Bar. Also part of the venue is the Campbell Room and Studio – both used for smaller shows, community groups, corporate hospitality and private functions.
