= Alison Peacock =

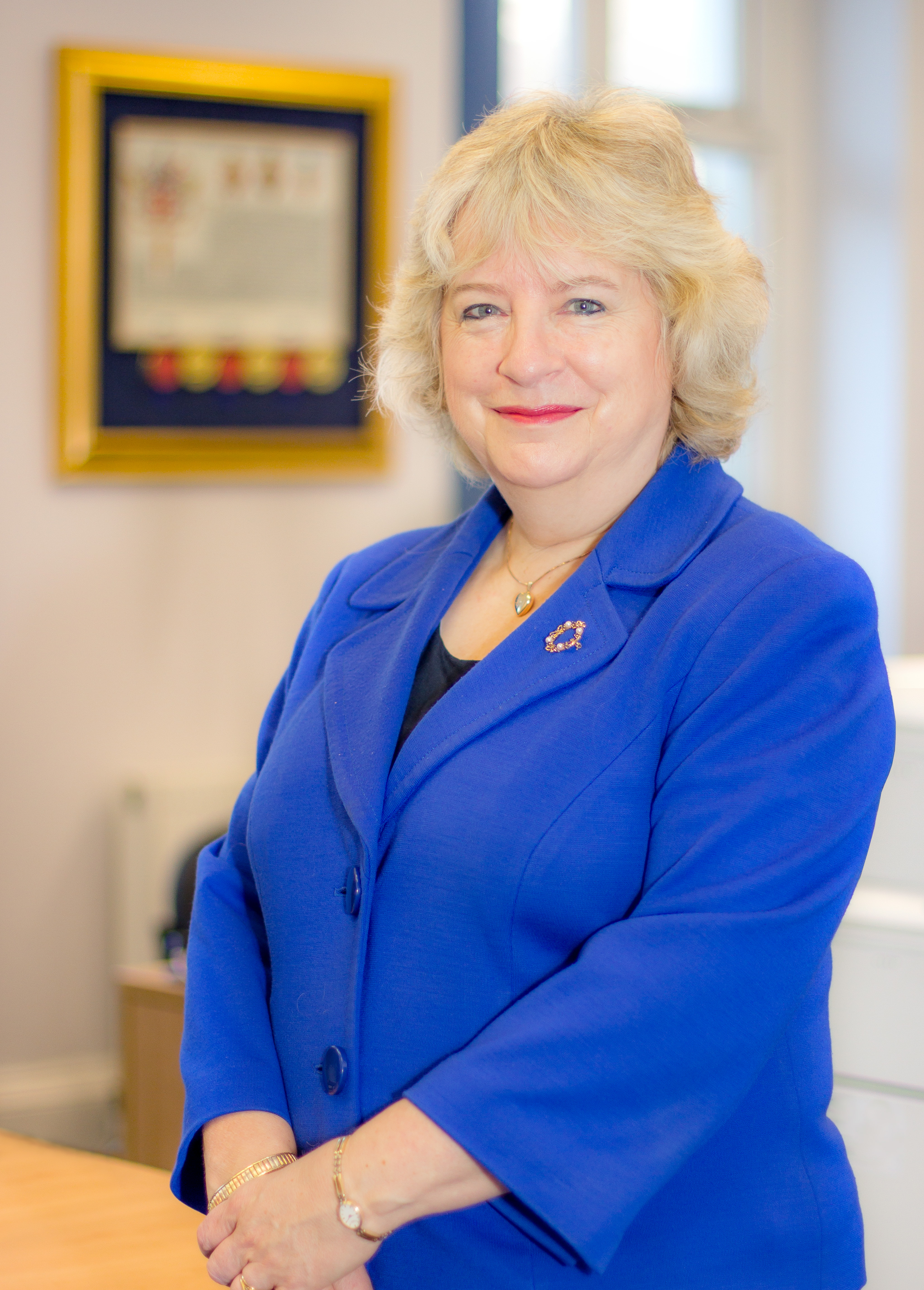
Dame Alison Peacock (11 January 2017)

Dame Alison Margaret Peacock, DBE DL FRSA (née Mann; born 17 October 1959) is a British educator and writer, known for the Learning Without Limits approach to education. She has been chief executive of the Chartered College of Teaching since 2017, and has also been a trustee of Teach First and a columnist for The Times Educational Supplement.

== Early life and education ==
Alison Margaret Mann was born in 1959 in London to Leslie and Patricia Mann, and educated at Oakthorpe and Hunsdon primary schools. She attended Hadham Hall School and the University of London, earning a BA degree in 1981. She attended the University of Warwick where she gained a PGCE in primary education in 1982. In 1996 she was awarded a MEd from Queens' College, Cambridge.

== Teaching career ==
She started her teaching career in secondary schools, then worked in Hertfordshire Teachers' Centres before moving into primary school education where she remained until the start of 2017. Her first teaching post was at Passmores Comprehensive, Harlow, Essex in 1992, which some years later featured in a fly-on-the-wall documentary, Educating Essex, for Channel 4.

She taught in one other secondary school, two Teachers' Centres and three primary schools before her last teaching appointment. In 2003 she was appointed Headteacher of The Wroxham School, Potters Bar, Hertfordshire, a single form primary school in 'special measures'. The school emerged from 'special measures' ten months later and within two and a half years was rated as 'outstanding' by Ofsted. Subsequently, when re-inspected in both 2009 and 2013 it was judged to be 'outstanding' in all categories.

In 2012, The Wroxham Foundation was established. The school generated international interest in its "Learning without Limits" inclusive, creative approach to school improvement and has hosted delegations from around the world. The school annually accepts students, as part of their teacher training, from Appalachian State University (USA) and Paderborn University (Germany).

== Honours, memberships and other educational roles ==
(the commented-out block is deleted; see the note below on what should be restored)

In July 2014 she was awarded the honorary degree of Doctor of Letters by the University of Brighton. In May 2015 she was appointed as a Deputy Lieutenant by the Lord Lieutenant of Hertfordshire, the Countess of Verulam. In December 2015 she was appointed as a visiting professor by the University of Hertfordshire.

In 2018, she became honorary fellow of Queens' College, Cambridge, one of five of the first ever female fellows admitted.

== Educational research ==
She has taken part in educational research projects since 1985. At Wreake Valley Community College, Leicester, in 1985 she participated in the ORACLE study led by Professor Maurice Galton, University of Leicester. In 1996 her master's degree thesis 'Situational integration is not enough' explored inclusion in primary classrooms through a case study approach.

The ESRC funded a project on Pupil Voice in which she led school based research from 1999 to 2001 together with Dr Sara Bragg and Professor Michael Fielding, University of Sussex.

From 2001 to 2003 she was one of nine teachers whose classroom practice and pedagogical approach was studied by a team of University of Cambridge researchers led by Professor Donald McIntyre. The research was published in 2004 as the book Learning without Limits.

From 2006 to 2009, Wroxham School formed the basis of research into teaching without labelling by ability. In 2012 she published the findings as co-researcher with Susan Hart, Mary Jane Drummond and Mandy Swann in Creating Learning without Limits. This work has been translated and published: in Spanish by Ediciones Morata and in Japanese by Josai University and the English Agency (Japan).

Assessment for Learning without Limits was published by McGraw Hill in July 2016.

== Personal details ==
She married on 6 August 1983, has two daughters and lives in Hertford, Hertfordshire.

== Publications ==
In addition to her books, Assessment for Learning without Limits and Creating Learning without Limits she has written several contributions to other books and numerous articles, some of these publications include:

- Working as a team. Children and Teachers at Wheatcroft Primary School Learning from Each other, FORUM (2001).
- Listening to Children FORUM (2001)
- Raising standards. What do we really want?, FORUM (2005)
- Escaping from the bottom set. Finding a voice for school improvement, School Improvement Journal (2006)
- If you go down to the woods today, FORUM (2007)
- Exploring the art of the possible, an irresistible invitation to all learners, NASEN (2009)
- The Cambridge Primary Review: a voice for the future, FORUM (2010)
- Beyond assessment levels: Reaching for new heights in primary education, NUT (2011)
- Developing outward facing schools where citizenship is a lived experience, The Gordon Cook Foundation (2012)
- Circles of Influence, Sanders, E (Ed) (2012); Moving beyond “What’s in it for me?”
- The art of the possible: creative principle leadership, Wilson, A (Ed) (2015); Creativity in Primary Education, Sage Publications Ltd., London
