= Daisy Dunn =

English writer and classicist

- Born: London, United Kingdom
- Occupations: Author and classicist
- Years active: 2016–present

Academic background
- Education: Ibstock Place School; The Lady Eleanor Holles School
- Alma mater: St Hilda's College, Oxford (BA); Courtauld Institute of Art (MA); University College London (PhD)
- Thesis: (2013)
- Website: www.daisydunn.co.uk

Daisy Florence Dunn is an English author and classicist who is known for making her specialty accessible to the public through radio and other media avenues.

== Early life and education ==
Daisy Dunn was born in London and attended Ibstock Place School in Southwest London and The Lady Eleanor Holles School in Hampton on an academic scholarship. She graduated in classics from St Hilda's College, Oxford in 2009, and won a scholarship to study for an MA in the History of Art at the Courtauld Institute, London, specialising in Titian, Venice and Renaissance Europe. She was awarded a PhD from University College London with a thesis exploring ekphrasis in Greek and Latin poetry and sixteenth-century Italian painting. She was long-listed in 2015 for the international £20,000 Notting Hill Editions Prize for the essay "An Unlikely Friendship".

== Writing ==
In 2016 she published her first two books, a biography of the Latin love poet Catullus and a new translation of his poems. The biography, entitled Catullus' Bedspread, received endorsements from Boris Johnson, Robert Harris and Tom Holland and was described as a "superb portrait" in The Sunday Times. Dunn's translation of one of Catullus' expletives resulted in a series of letters in The Times Literary Supplement and an article in The Times. In a 2016 article in The Guardian Simon Schama included Dunn in his list of leading female historians.

Dunn's 2019 dual biography of Pliny the Elder and Pliny the Younger, In the Shadow of Vesuvius: A Life of Pliny, published as The Shadow of Vesuvius in the US, was a New York Times Editor's Choice, a Waterstones Best History Book of 2019, and a Book of the Year in several publications. Dunn was interviewed ahead of its release by The Sunday Times.

Also in 2019, Dunn published an anthology of ancient stories in English translation, Of Gods and Men: 100 Stories from Ancient Greece and Rome, for which she was interviewed by Paul Ross on TalkRadio. A month later, she released Homer, part of a new "expert" series of Ladybird books.

In 2020, Dunn was awarded the Classical Association Prize, which recognises efforts to bring the classics to public attention.

Dunn's sixth book, Not Far From Brideshead: Oxford Between the Wars, a group biography of the classicists Maurice Bowra, E. R. Dodds and Gilbert Murray, was published in March 2022. In The Times, Laura Freeman wrote of Dunn's "gift for making the arcane accessible and the forbidding more friendly" and the book as being "a love letter to learning". It was described by Leo Robson in the New Statesman as "Lucid, agile, juicy, nuanced". It was listed as a book of the year by Waterstones, The Independent, and The Daily Telegraph, and longlisted for the Runciman Award.

In 2024, Dunn published The Missing Thread: A New History of the Ancient World through the Women who Shaped It, a New Yorker best book of the year. Lyta Gold for the New York Times noted that Dunn illuminated familiar stories like those of Caesar and Cato or Caesar and Brutus, by centering women like Servilia, who was Caesar's long-term girlfriend, Cato's half sister and Brutus's mother. The book was also longlisted for the Runciman Award.

== Journalism and broadcasting ==
Dunn is radio and podcast critic of The Spectator, as of 2020, and a commentator, critic and columnist for The Daily Telegraph, The Sunday Times and Literary Review, among other publications.

She is a regular contributor to BBC Radio 4, particularly the Today Programme, the BBC World Service, TalkRadio, Times Radio, BBC.com (Culture) and BBC 2, for which she participated in the 2016 Christmas University Challenge for notable alumni, with her team winning the series. In 2018 and 2019 she presented two short films on Ancient Wisdom for BBC Ideas. Dunn's other television credits include Queens of Combat (PBS, 2025), a documentary on ancient Rome's female gladiators, Troy Story (Sky History, 2025), on excavations at the site of the ancient city, and Rome: Rise and Fall of a Dynasty (Channel 5, 2024).

Dunn presents documentaries and podcasts for Dan Snow's media network History Hit.

== Young Leaders programme ==
In 2024 Dunn was elected to the inaugural UK-Italy Young Leaders' Programme, established by a memorandum signed by the British and Italian prime ministers.

== Works ==
- Catullus' Bedspread: The Life of Rome's Most Erotic Poet (HarperCollins/Harper Press, 2016) (UK Hardback ISBN 978-0007554331 and US Hardback ISBN 978-0062317025)
- The Poems of Catullus: A New Translation (HarperCollins, 2016) (UK Paperback) ISBN 978-0007582969
- In the Shadow of Vesuvius: A Life of Pliny (William Collins, 2019) ISBN 978-0008211097 (US title: The Shadow of Vesuvius: A Life of Pliny (Liveright, 2019) ISBN 978-1631496394)
- Of Gods and Men: 100 Stories from Ancient Greece and Rome (Head of Zeus, 2019) ISBN 978-1788546744
- Homer illus. Angelo Rinaldi (Ladybird Books, Michael Joseph, 2019) ISBN 978-0718188283
- Not Far From Brideshead: Oxford Between the Wars (Weidenfeld & Nicolson, 2022) ISBN 978-1474615570
- The Missing Thread: A Women's History of the Ancient World (Viking, 2024) ISBN 978-0593299661 LCCN 2024-23267
