= Esther Lawrence =

American educationist and school principal (1862–1944)

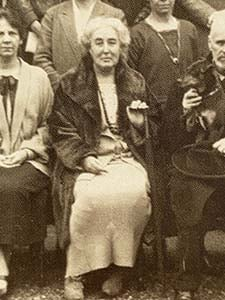
- Born: Esther Ella Lawrence; 1862; New York
- Died: July 23, 1944 (aged 81–82); Aldenham
- Known for: Principal of what is now Froebel College
- Predecessor: Emilie Michaelis
- Successor: Eglantyne Mary Jebb

Esther Ella Lawrence (1862 – July 23, 1944) was a New York born educationist and school principal. She took over from the founder and moved what would become the Froebel College to be a residential college in Roehampton to train kindergarten teachers over three years.

== Life ==
Lawrence was born in New York in 1862. She was the third child born to Emily and John M. Lawrence - they would have six more. Her mother was from Jamaica and her father was English ad they were both Jewish. The family moved to London where she attended South Hampstead High School. She was briefly at Bedford College before studying at the recently formed Tavistock Place Training College. The college was founded by the Froebel Society and Penelope Lawrence was the head. She left in 1883 and briefly ran her own kindergarten before she was head hunted by Alice Woods in 1884 to lead the preparatory department of Chiswick High School. Alice became her lifelong friend - even after she left in 1893 to work with Emilie Michaelis.

Emilie Michaelis had started one of the first English kindergartens in Croydon in 1875. Lawrence was to take charge of the kindergarten which would be called the Froebel Educational Institute in the following year. The facility existed because of the fund raising efforts of Julia Schwabe.

She had a four-year break from the institute when she went to Naples to work at the Froebel kindergarten there. She returned in 1899 and she was re-employed by the Froebel Educational Institute. In 1901 Emilie Michaelis retired and Lawrence was appointed as her successor. Under her management the courses extended to be three years in length at what became a residential college at Grove House, Roehampton.

Lawrence retired in 1931, and was an enthusiastic follower of the Tasmanian educationalist F. Matthias Alexander. She died in 1944 in Aldenham. There is a painting of her by Gerald Festus Kelly at Froebel College.
