= Molly Brearley =

English teacher and writer (1905–1994)

Molly Brearley CBE
- Born: 28 March 1905; Hastings, England
- Died: 27 March 1994 (aged 88); Warwick, England
- Education: Liverpool University
- Occupations: Educationalist and writer
- Known for: led the Froebel Educational Institute
- Parent(s): Mabel Daisy (née Root) and Herman Brearley

Molly Root Brearley CBE (28 March 1905–27 March 1994) was an English educationist, teacher and writer. She led the Froebel Educational Institute from 1955 and 1970. She established the Froebel Nursery and a matching Froebel Nursery Research Project. The 1969 book Fundamentals in the First School was created with her at the helm.

== Life ==
Brearley was born in Hastings, East Sussex, England, in 1905. Her parents were Mabel Daisy and Dr Herman Brearley and she was their first child. Her mother was a pianist and piano teacher and her father was an organist and a professor of music. Her schooling was excellent until she was eleven. She attended a small private school where the constant nature walks and discussions about paintings meant that the teacher never lost her interest. When she was eleven the family moved north where her father was Blackburn Cathedral's organist. Brearley went to Blackburn High School for Girls where she studied to enter university.

In 1928, she graduated from Liverpool University with an English degree and a teacher's certificate. Her first job was teaching at Kettering Girls' High School.

In 1955, she was appointed to lead the Froebel Educational Institute. The previous Principal was Eglantyne Mary Jebb. Brearley brought to a role a very wide range of experience. She had knowledge of Piaget and Froebel's work . She had taught and lectured and volunteered with the Girl Guides and the Brownies.

Brearley created courses where teachers could gain diplomas and the college became involved in cross-curricula Bachelor of Education courses. In their first year, students would learn about child development while at the same time learning about subjects like maths and science.

Brearley was honoured as a CBE in 1965 for her services to education. In the following year, A Teacher's Guide to Reading Piaget was published, a book she had co-written with Elizabeth Hitchfield.

The college's ideas were contained in Fundamentals in the First School, which was a book where Brearley chaired the authors and then she and Raymond Bott edited and published in 1969. The book included six generalisations that can be summarised as: (1) children are individuals; (2) pupils construct their mind through interactions; (3) learning is continuative and knowledge is cumulative; (4) the concept that children have "stages" is useful; (5) children who cooperate will collaborate to gain knowledge; and (6) the search for knowledge is self-propelling.

Brearley retired in 1970.

Molly Brearley and Dame Joyce Bishop obtained funding from the Leverhulme Foundation to create a one year study of Project for the Study of Educational Failure in Underprivileged Children in 1971 to 1972. Brearly and Bishop established a Free nursery in the college's grounds. The Froebel Research Nursery School started to be used in 1973 as part of the Froebel Nursery Research Project. They persuaded Froebel lecturer Chris Athey to lead the nursery and the work which ran until 1978. As a result Athey published Extending Thought in Young Children in 1990.

Brearley died in Warwick, one day short of her 89th birthday.
