= Eleonore Heerwart =

German kindergarten teacher, educator and writer

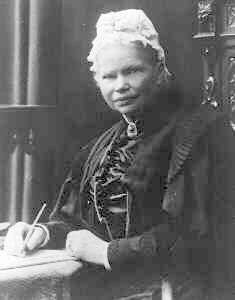
Eleonore Heerwart

Eleonore Heerwart (24 February 1835 – 19 December 1911) was a German kindergarten teacher, educator and writer.

== Biography ==
Eleonore Heerwart was born on 24 February 1835 in Eisenach, Germany. Her family moved to Mechterstädt after the early death of her father. She studied at the secondary school for girls in Mechterstädt. In 1852, following the death of her mother, she moved to Keilhau, located in the Thuringia region, where she took training as a kindergarten teacher from Friedrich Fröbel, Louise Fröbel and Wilhelm Middendorf.

After completing the training, she worked as a private tutor for few years. She later moved to Manchester in 1861, and started kindergarten teacher training.

She subsequently initiated similar activities in Dublin and London. She spent nearly two decades, and played important role in advancing kindergarten system in these places. Importantly she was the first to introduce kindergarten activities in Ireland. In London she was associated with the British and Foreign School Society, where she opened kindergarten training department.

In 1883 she returned to Germany. She published number of essays and monographs to advance the idea of kindergarten and Fröbelian pedagogy.She founded Froebel Museum at Eisenach. She also enlisted American support to advance kindergarten system in Germany through different projects.

She was the president of International Kindergarten Union.

She died in Eisenach on 19 December 1911.
