= Frances Buss =

British educator and feminist (1827–1894)

Frances Mary Buss
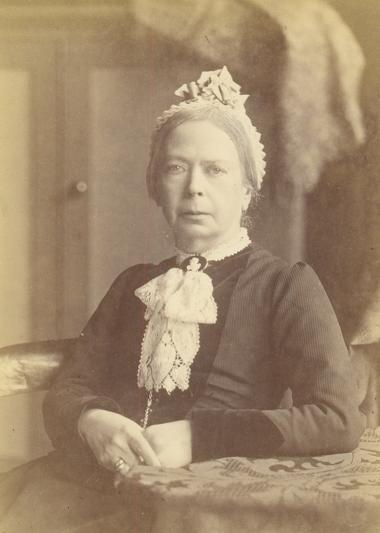
- Buss, c. 1882
- Born: Frances Mary Buss; 16 August 1827; London, United Kingdom of Great Britain and Ireland
- Died: 24 December 1894 (aged 67); London, United Kingdom of Great Britain and Ireland
- Occupations: Headmistress, pioneer
- Years active: 1848–1894
- Known for: One of the first headmistresses at North London Collegiate School for Ladies
- Parents: Robert William Buss; Frances Fleetwood

Frances Mary Buss (16 August 1827 – 24 December 1894) was a British headmistress and a pioneer of girls' education.

Buss became the first headmistress of the North London Collegiate School for Ladies in 1850, a position she held for the remainder of her life. She was a leading figure in campaigns to allow girls to sit public examinations and to enter universities, and in 1871 she founded the Camden School for Girls to extend affordable education to more girls. She served as the founding president of the Association of Head Mistresses from 1874 until her death in 1894, and played a central role in establishing the Cambridge Training College (later Hughes Hall) for teacher training in 1885.

In 1869 she became the first woman Fellow of the College of Preceptors. Buss was also a suffragist, participating in the Kensington Society and the London Suffrage Committee. Her educational values became a model for schools throughout the United Kingdom and overseas, and her name remains associated with that of her contemporary Dorothea Beale in a well-known satirical rhyme.

== Life ==
The daughter of Robert William Buss, a painter and etcher, and his wife, Frances Fleetwood, Buss was one of six of their ten children to survive into adulthood. Her grandparents, whom she was visiting in Aldersgate, sent her to a private school housed in the most basic accommodation "...to get me out of the way". Next she was sent to a similar school in Kentish Town which she remembered as simply consisting of children learning Murray's Grammar. Aged 10 she attended a more advanced school in Hampstead; by the age of fourteen she herself was teaching there and by sixteen she was occasionally left in charge of the school.

Her father's career as an artist being at times unsuccessful, to help the family finances her mother set up a private school in Clarence Road, Kentish Town, in 1845, at which Frances assisted, and which was based on the ideas of Johann Heinrich Pestalozzi.

During 1848–9, she attended evening lectures at the newly opened Queen's College in Harley Street, London. She was taught by F. D. Maurice, Charles Kingsley, and R. C. Trench, and gained certificates in French, German and Geography. To Dorothea Beale, a contemporary at Queen's, she described the education she had gained there as opening 'a new life to me, I mean intellectually'.

== Career ==
The school was renamed the North London Collegiate School for Ladies and moved to larger premises in Camden Street on 4 April 1850. Buss was its first headmistress and remained so for the rest of her life. Under her headship, and with the help of family members, the school became a model for girls' education. By 1865 the school had 200 day girls, with a few boarders, but was still run as a private, family concern, with her father teaching art and her brother Septimus, scripture.

In July 1870, Frances Mary Buss handed over the school to trustees, and in the following year she founded the Camden School for Girls with the aim of offering more affordable education for girls.

Buss was at the forefront of campaigns for the endowment of girls' schools (see Endowed Schools Act 1869), and for girls to be allowed to sit public examinations and to enter universities. She became the founding president of the Association of Head Mistresses in 1874, a position she held until 1894, and she was also involved in establishing the Teachers' Guild in 1883 and the Cambridge Training College (later Hughes Hall) for training teachers in 1885.

In 1869 she became the first woman Fellow of the College of Preceptors, helping to establish the College's professorship of the science and art of education along with her co-fellow Beata Doreck in 1872. Her election to a Fellowship of the College in 1873 was the only public recognition she ever received. She was also a member of the Council of the Teachers' Training and Registration Society.

Buss was a suffragist, participating in the Kensington Society, a woman's discussion society, and the London Suffrage Committee.

She is buried in the churchyard of Theydon Bois in Essex.

== Legacy ==
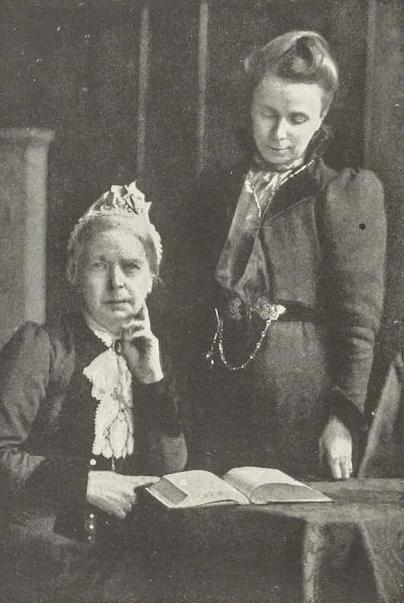
Frances Mary Buss and Sophie Bryant

Her name is associated with that of Dorothea Beale in a satirical rhyme:

Miss Buss and Miss Beale,
Cupid's darts do not feel.
How different from us,
Miss Beale and Miss Buss.

In the spring of each year North London Collegiate School, North London Collegiate School Jeju (in South Korea), North London Collegiate School Dubai (in United Arab Emirates), North London Collegiate School (Singapore), North London Collegiate School Ho Chi Minh City (in Vietnam), North London Collegiate School (in Japan) and Camden School for Girls all hold Founder's Day to commemorate Frances Mary Buss and her legacy. Pupils, staff and guests each carry a daffodil in memory of Miss Buss's favourite flower.

The educational values that Frances Mary Buss taught at the North London Collegiate School became the model for many schools throughout the UK and overseas. This included Bournemouth's Talbot Heath School started by Mary Broad and Pretoria High School for Girls, founded in South Africa by Edith Aitken, a former pupil of Miss Buss.
