= Joseph Payne (educationalist) =

Joseph Payne (2 March 1808, Bury St Edmunds – 30 April 1876, Bayswater) was an English educationalist and the first Professor of Education at the College of Preceptors in London.

== Early life ==
Payne was born in Bury St Edmunds in Suffolk. He came to prominence as one of the most vocal adherents of the methods of Joseph Jacotot in England, publishing in 1830 an exposition of Jacotot's methods and lecturing to other teachers about education while teaching at a school in the New Kent Road, London. In 1838 he established Denmark Hill Grammar School with David Fletcher.

== Career ==
In 1845 he opened the Mansion grammar school, at Leatherhead in Surrey. The school was very successful in exams and followed a detailed curriculum. Initially the pupils studied spelling and writing, history and geography, French, word and object lessons, arithmetic. As they progressed, English grammar, botany, and physics were added and at the age of 12, Latin German, mathematics, English literature, and physics were introduced. Chemistry would be added in the final two years.

He retired from teaching in 1868 and began to write various textbooks and criticized elementary education in the England. He was also heavily involved in reforms and believed education could transform society. He was a founding member of the College of Preceptors and became its first Professor of science and art of education in 1873. He was one of the founders of the Women's Education Union, and he was also one of the original shareholders of the Girls' Public Day School Company which was created by the Union. Payne was also a member of the council of the Social Science Association and of the committees of the Kindergarten Association. Payne and Caroline Bishop are credited with founding the Froebel Society.

== Family ==
He married Eliza Dyer in December 1837, and they had four children, John Burnell, Joseph Frank, Mary Eliza and William Payne. His wife died in October 1875 and he retired from the College of Preceptors in December 1875 due to ill health. He died a few months later in April 1876.

== Works ==
- Lectures on the History of Education, with A Visit to German Schools. Longmans, Green, & Co., 1893.
- Lectures on the Science and Art of Education. E.L. Kellogg, 1890.

The Archives of the Institute of Education, University of London holds the papers of Joseph Payne and his family and the records of the College of Preceptors.

== Sources ==
- Aldrich, Richard (1995). School and society in Victorian Britain: Joseph Payne and the new world of education.
- Chapman, J V (1985). Professional roots: the College of Preceptors in British society.
- College of Preceptors. (1896). Fifty Years of Progress in Education: A Review of the Work of the College of Preceptors from its Foundation in 1846 to its Jubilee in 1896. London: C. F. Hodgson Publishing.
