= Chartered College of Teaching =

UK learned society

- Formation: 1846; 180 years ago
- Headquarters: London, WC1N; United Kingdom
- Coordinates: 51°52′55″N 00°12′08″W
- Members: 42,000 worldwide
- President: Aimee Tinkler
- Treasurer: Marcus Richards
- Chief Executive Officer: Dame Alison Peacock
- Patron: Princess Beatrice
- Website: chartered.college
- Remarks: Motto: Pro Doctrines et Disciplinis ("For teaching and learning")

The Chartered College of Teaching is a learned society for the teaching profession in the United Kingdom. Founded in 1846, the college was incorporated by Queen Victoria into a royal charter as the College of Preceptors in 1849. A supplemental charter was granted in 1998 changing the name to the College of Teachers. A further supplemental charter granted in 2017 changed the society to its current name, and permitted the granting of Chartered Teacher status to members.

== History ==
The college was founded in 1846 by a group of private schoolmasters from Brighton who were concerned about standards within their profession. A provisional committee was set up in early 1846 under the chairmanship of Henry Stein Turrell (1815–1863), principal of the Montpelier House School in Brighton. After meetings in London and Brighton a general meeting was held at the Freemason's Tavern in Great Queen Street, London, on 20 June 1846. Some 300 schoolmasters attended, some 60 members enrolled and founding resolutions were passed, including:

That in the opinion of this meeting, it is desirable for the protection of the interests of both the scholastic profession and the public, that some proof of qualification, both as to the amount of knowledge and the art of conveying it to others, should be required, from and after a certain time to be hereinafter specified, of all persons who may be desirous of entering the profession; and that the test, in the first instance, should be applied to Assistant Masters only.
That in the opinion of this meeting, the test of qualification should be referred to a legally authorised or corporate body, or college, consisting of persons engaged in tuition.
That for the purpose of effecting this object – viz., the formation of a corporate body – the members of the profession who enrol their names at this meeting, do resolve themselves, and are hereby resolved, into the College of Preceptors; and that those persons now enrolled, shall incur no liability beyond the amount of their respective annual subscriptions.
That a Council, consisting of the members of the Provisional Committee, with power to add to their number, be now appointed for the purpose of conducting the business of the institution, and that Mr Turrell be appointed President of the Council.

The college created a system for the formal examination and qualification of secondary school teachers. It was also one of the first bodies to examine and provide certificates for secondary school pupils of both sexes, from all over England and Wales, in a wide variety of subjects. In 1873 it became the first institution to appoint Professors of Education.

During the 1870s the college helped to establish education as a subject worthy of study at university level, resulting in the appointment of Joseph Payne as the first Professor of Education in 1873. The power to appoint Professors of Education is recognised in the college's current royal charter. Frances Buss (1827–1894) and Sir John Adams (1857–1934) were also connected to the college. During the 1950s the college pioneered management training schemes for teachers (at the time these were known as school administration courses).

On 21 February 1981 the college was granted armorial bearings.

Until 2016 the college awarded a range of professional qualifications for teachers aligned to university qualifications up to and including doctoral fellowships.

The college's patron was Prince Philip, Duke of Edinburgh. Following his death, Princess Beatrice became the college's patron.

=== Objects ===
Under the 1849 Charter the objects of the college were:

'promoting sound learning and of advancing the interests of education more especially among the middle Classes by affording facilities to the Teacher for the acquiring of a sound knowledge of his Profession and by providing for the Periodical Session of a competent Board of Examiners to ascertain and give Certificates of the acquirements and fitness for their office of persons engaged or desiring to be engaged in the Education of Youth particularly in the Private Schools of England and Wales'

The current objects of the college, since 2017, are:

'the promotion of sound learning and the improvement and recognition of the art, science and practice of teaching for the public benefit'

=== Journals ===
- The Educational Times published 1847–1923
- Education Today published quarterly until December 2016
- Impact published termly from May 2017

=== Books ===
- College of Preceptors (1896). Fifty years of progress in education : a review of the work of the College of Preceptors from its foundation in 1846 to its jubilee in 1896. London: College of Preceptors.

== Membership designations ==
The Chartered College of Teaching has the following membership designations or post-nominals. These include:

- MCCT - ECT Membership
- MCCT - Full Membership
- FCCT - Fellowship

Fellowship of the college, must be nominated by a peer, and is based on the following criteria:

- Must hold high academic and educational oriented qualifications;
- Must be senior teachers of at least ten years' standing;
- Must have made a significant contribution to the teaching profession; and/or
- Must serve in educational management at a senior level.

Historic Affiliates

This is a closed category of membership, consisting of those members continuing in the grade of membership they previously held in the College of Teachers, whose membership of the College of Teachers dates from before 1 September 2015. They are legacy designation titles or post-nominals that are no longer awarded.

- Associate Member of the College of Teachers (AMCollT)
- Member of the College of Teachers (MCollT or MCollP)
- Fellow of the College of Teachers (FCollT or FCollP)

Prior to this as the College of Preceptors it also awardeded the earned levels of Associate (ACP), Licentiate (LCP) and Fellow (FCP) of the College of Preceptors. Each was awarded via examinations.

== Collections ==
The college archives are held by the Institute of Education (IOE) archives, University College London. They were acquired in 1991 with the help of Professor Richard Aldrich. Later accessions were made in 2003 when the college moved into the IOE.

== Other sources ==
- American Association for the Advancement of Science. 1887. The London College of Preceptors. Moses King, v.9:471.
- Balfour, Graham. 1903. The Educational Systems of Great Britain and Ireland. Clarendon Press, 185.
- Eve. H.W. 1899. Secondary Education and the Primary Examinations. British Medical Journal. Published by British Medical Association. vol.1:123.
- Chapman, J. Vincent. 1985, Professional Roots: The College of Preceptors in British Society. Theydon Bois Epping.
- College of Preceptors. 1847. The Mechanics' Magazine. Original from Oxford University, 443–46, 485–90.
- College of Preceptors. 1908. Journal of the Royal Society of Arts. Royal Society of Arts (Great Britain), published for the Society by George Bell, v.57 1908–09, 432.
- College of Preceptors. 1895. Report of the Commissioners ... Great Britain Royal Commission on Secondary Education. Great Britain:H.M. Stationery Off., by Eyre and Spottiswoode, 58.
- Montgomery, Robert John. 1967. College of Preceptors. Examinations: An Account of Their Evolution as Administrative Devices in England. University of Pittsburgh Press, 303.
- Monroe, Paul. 1913. Preceptors, The college of. A Cyclopedia of Education. Gale Research Co., v.5:26.
- The Teacher's Registration Bill. 1891. Hansard's Parliamentary Debates. Great Britain Parliament, Thomas Curson Hansard. v.350 1891 Feb–Mar, 1003.
- Winnipeg Science Fiction Society, Royal Society of Arts (Great Britain). 1873. The College of Preceptors. Winnipeg, v. 21:893.
