= Bertha von Marenholtz-Bülow =

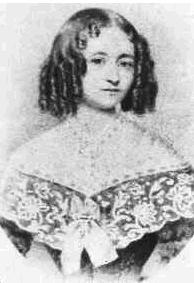
Bertha von Marenholtz-Bülow

Baroness Bertha von Marenholtz-Bülow (born 5 March 1810 in Brunswick; died 9 January 1893 in Dresden) was a German noblewoman and educator noted for her work in spreading the kindergarten concept through Europe.

== Biography ==
Bertha was daughter of baron Georg von Bülow-Wendhausen and countess Amalie Marie von Wartensleben. She married baron Wilhelm von Marenholtz, whom she left in 1847 without getting divorced.

She was attracted by the ideas of Friedrich Fröbel, whom she met in 1850. She became his disciple and devoted her life to founding kindergartens in Germany and many other European countries.

== Works ==
- Beiträge zum Verständnis Friedrich Fröbels (Contributions to understanding Friedrich Fröbel; 1876)

She wrote a number of pamphlets on the kindergarten, several of which have been translated into English.
