= Stadtilm =

- Town
- Coat of arms

- Location of Stadtilm within Ilm-Kreis district
- Interactive map of Stadtilm
- Location within Germany Location within Thuringia
- Coordinates: 50°46′30″N 11°4′51″E
- Country: Germany
- State: Thuringia
- District: Ilm-Kreis

Government
  - Mayor (2024–30): Lars Petermann (Ind.)

Area
  - Total: 120.26 km^{2} (46.43 sq mi)
- Elevation: 360 m (1,180 ft)

Population (2025-12-31)
  - Total: 8,312
  - Density: 69.12/km^{2} (179.0/sq mi)
- Time zone: UTC+01:00 (CET)
  - Summer (DST): UTC+02:00 (CEST)
- Postal codes: 99326
- Dialling codes: 03629
- Vehicle registration: IK
- Website: www.stadtilm.de

Stadtilm (German pronunciation: [ʃtatˈʔɪlm]) is a town in the Ilm-Kreis district, in Thuringia, Germany. It is situated on the river Ilm, 15 km northeast of Ilmenau, and 11 km southeast of Arnstadt. In July 2018 the former municipality of Ilmtal was merged into Stadtilm.

== Mayors ==
Term of office	Name	Party
2000–2012	Joachim Günsel	SPD
since July 2012	Lars Petermann	independent

== History ==
Within the German Empire (1871–1918), Stadtilm was part of the Principality of Schwarzburg-Rudolstadt.

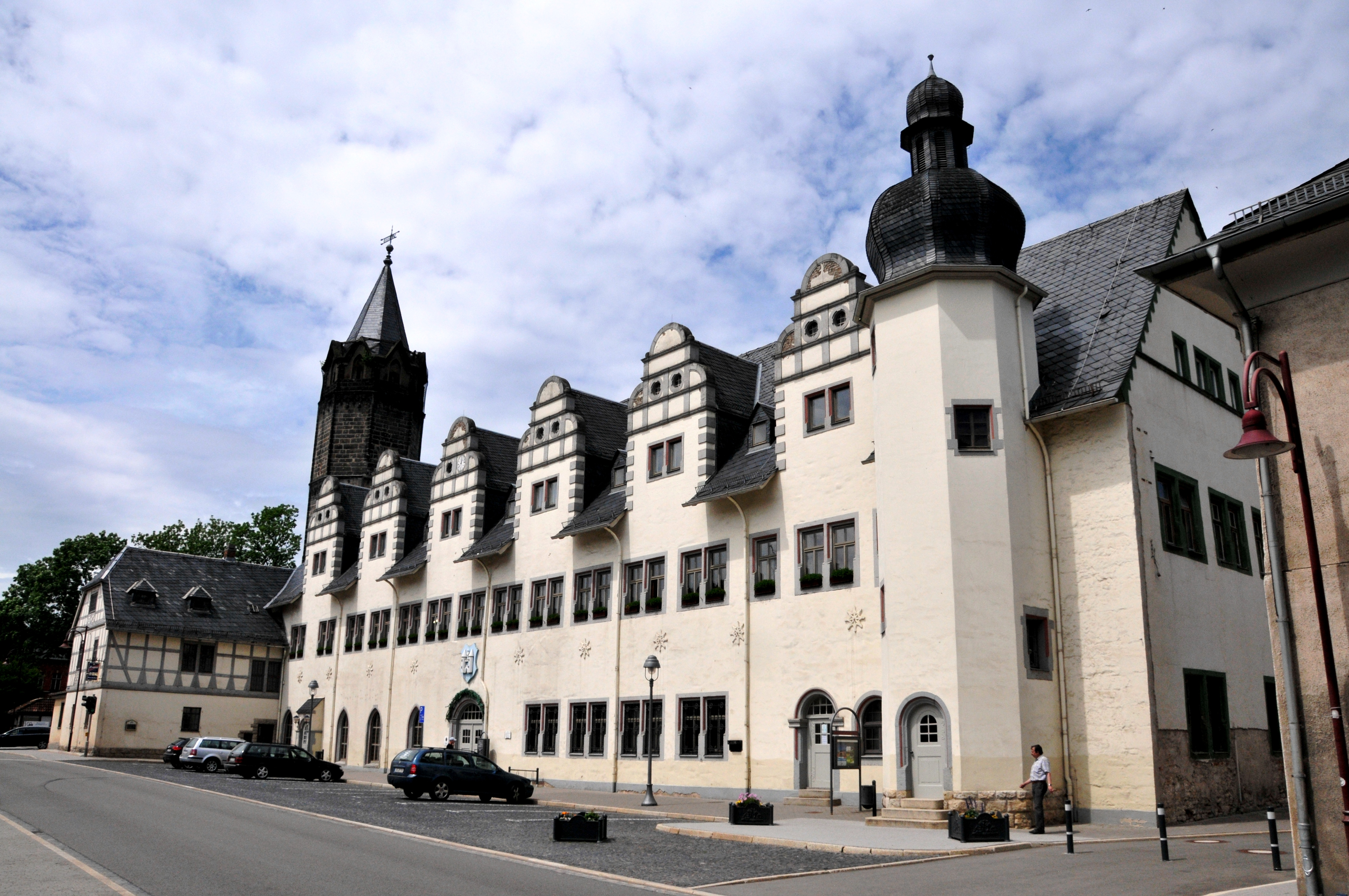
Stadtilm Town hall

== Notable people ==
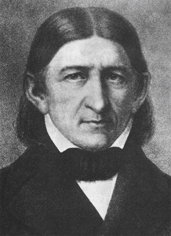
Friedrich Fröbel

- Friedrich Fröbel (1782–1852), educator, grew up after 1792 in Stadtilm
