= Ilmtal =

- Municipality
- Coat of arms
- Interactive map of Ilmtal
- Location within Germany Location within Thuringia
- Coordinates: 50°45′9″N 11°2′29″E
- Country: Germany
- State: Thuringia
- District: Ilm-Kreis
- Disbanded: 2018

Area
  - Total: 102.70 km^{2} (39.65 sq mi)
- Elevation: 370 m (1,210 ft)

Population (2016-12-31)
  - Total: 3,731
  - Density: 36.33/km^{2} (94.09/sq mi)
- Time zone: UTC+01:00 (CET)
  - Summer (DST): UTC+02:00 (CEST)
- Postal codes: 99326
- Dialling codes: 03629
- Vehicle registration: IK
- Website: www.ilmtal.eu

Ilmtal (German pronunciation: [ˈɪlmˌtaːl], lit. 'Ilm Valley') is a former municipality in the district Ilm-Kreis, in Thuringia, Germany. In July 2018, it was merged into the town Stadtilm.
