= National Froebel Foundation =

The National Froebel Foundation (NFF) was a foundation which validated examinations and set standards for teaching training courses at pre-school level in the United Kingdom. Named after German educator Friedrich Fröbel, it began in two separate bodies; the Froebel Society of 1874 and the National Froebel Union of 1887. In 1938, the two merged to form the National Froebel Foundation. The National Froebel Foundation continued until 2012 when it merged with the Froebel Educational Institute to form the Froebel Trust. The Froebel Trust continues as the UK's charity for the promotion of Froebelian education, funding research, training and educational conferences in the UK and outreach work overseas. The NFF's practitioner network continues as the National Froebel Network.

== Froebel Society ==
Professor Joseph Payne and Caroline Bishop are credited with founding the London Froebel Society. It was started in 1874 with Adelaide Manning amongst the early members. Caroline Bishop was advising the School board on the use of Kindergarten methods and Manning presented a paper on the same subject. The following year the society became national.

Its first President was Beata Doreck (1833–1875), an educationist from Mannheim Emily Shirreff was elected President in 1876, and continued for the rest of her life; she died in 1895. Later, in 1932, John Howard Whitehouse was President.
