= Froebel College =

College in Roehampton, London, England

Coordinates: 51.4557°N 0.2460°W

- University of Roehampton
- Location: Roehampton, London, England
- Motto: German: "Friede, Freude, Freiheit!"
- Motto in English: "Peace, Joy, Freedom!"
- Established: 1892; 134 years ago
- Named for: Friedrich Fröbel
- Principal: Simon Dorman
- Website: https://www.roehampton.ac.uk/colleges/froebel-college/

Froebel College is one of the four constituent colleges of the University of Roehampton.

== History ==
The college was founded as a women's teacher training college in 1892 by followers of Friedrich Fröbel. The Froebel Society had been formed in 1874 and in 1892 Julia Salis Schwabe led an initiative to found a college for training teachers. It was imperative that the trainee teachers should be allowed to practice whilst they were learning so a school/nursery was established in parallel. The college became co-educational in 1965.

Emilie Michaelis (1834–1904) was the First Principal of Froebel College serving from 1892 until 1901. She was succeeded by Esther Lawrence (1862–1944) who led for over 30 years finishing in 1932. The third Principal was Eglantyne Mary Jebb MA (1889–1978) who led until 1955 when she was replaced by her friend Molly Brearley.

Brearley created courses where teachers could gain diplomas and the college became involved in cross-curricular Bachelor of Education courses. In their first year, students would learn about child development, while simultaneously learning about subjects like maths and science. The college's ideas were contained in, Fundamentals in the First School, which was a book that Brearley and Raymond Bott edited and published in 1969. Brearley retired in 1970.

In 1975, the college became part of the Roehampton Institute of Higher Education, which became Roehampton University in 2004.

== People associated with the college ==
=== Notable alumna ===
- Christie Ade Ajayi (born 1930), Nigerian specialist in early childhood education

=== Notable alumnae of the kindergarten ===
- Helena Rosa Wright (1887–1982) was a doctor and a pioneer in birth control
- Margaret Lowenfeld (1890–1973) was a pioneer in child psychology and psychotherapy
