= Friedrich Fröbel =

German educator (1782–1852)

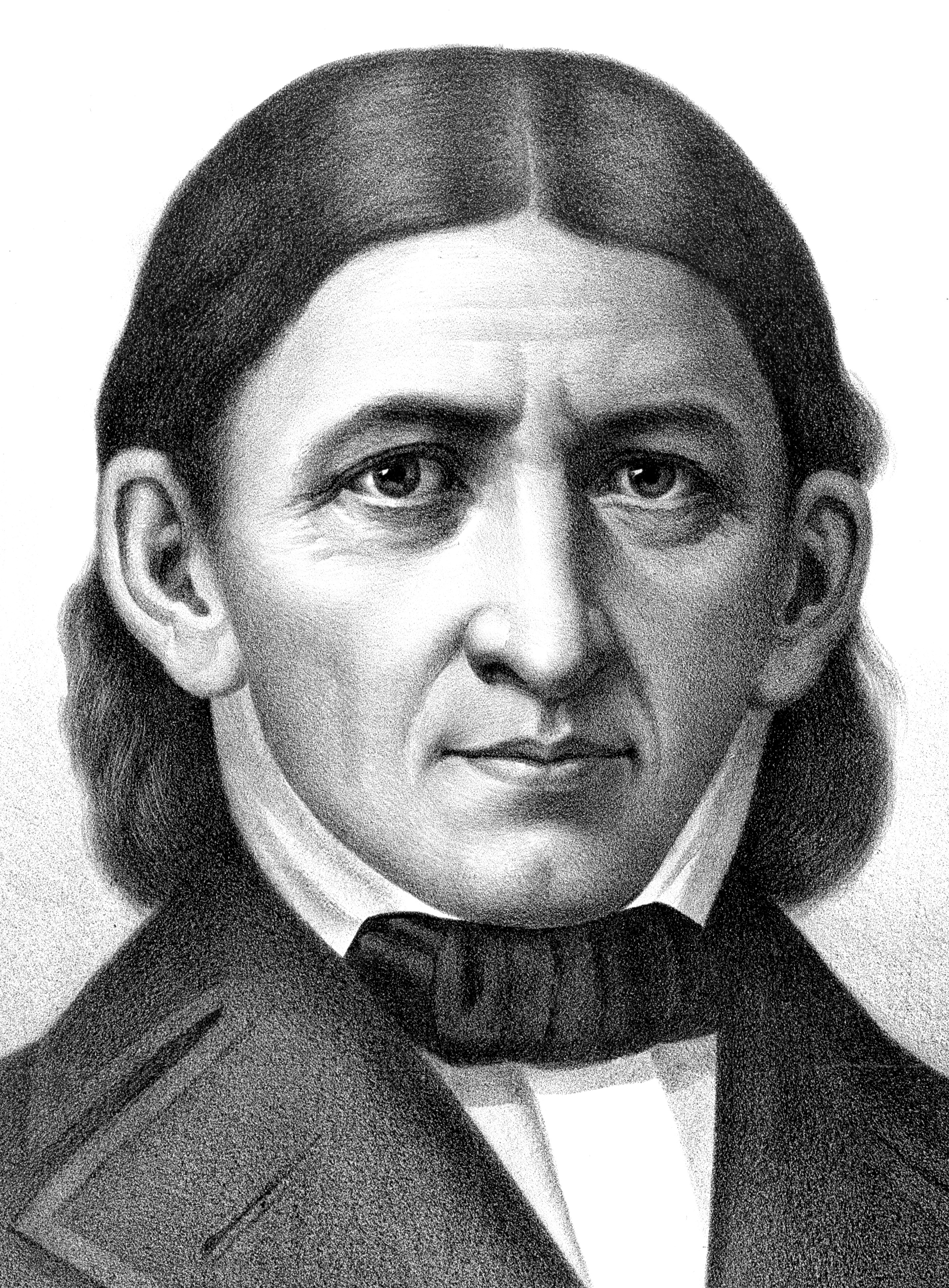
- Born: Friedrich Wilhelm August Fröbel; 21 April 1782; Oberweißbach, Schwarzburg-Rudolstadt, Holy Roman Empire
- Died: 21 June 1852 (aged 70); Schweina, Saxe-Meiningen, German Confederation

Philosophical work
- Era: Modern philosophy: 19th-century philosophy
- Region: Western philosophy: German philosophy
- Main interests: Pedagogy
- Notable ideas: Froebel gifts; Froebel star (disputed); Kindergarten

Friedrich Wilhelm August Fröbel or Froebel (German: [ˈfʁiːdʁɪç ˈvɪlhɛlm ˈʔaʊɡʊst ˈfʁøːbl̩]; 21 April 1782 – 21 June 1852) was a German pedagogue, a student of Johann Heinrich Pestalozzi, who laid the foundation for modern education based on the recognition that children have unique needs and capabilities. He created the concept of the kindergarten and coined the word, which soon entered the English language as well. He also developed the educational toys known as Froebel gifts.

== Biography ==
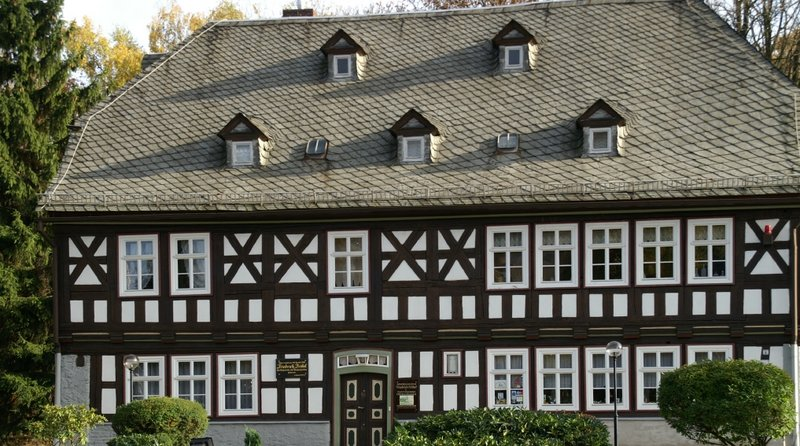
House in Oberweißbach where Fröbel was born

Friedrich Fröbel was born at Oberweißbach in the Principality of Schwarzburg-Rudolstadt in Thuringia. A cousin of his was the mother of Henriette Schrader-Breymann, and Henriette became a student of his. Fröbel's father, Johann Jacob Fröbel, who died in 1802, was the pastor of the orthodox Lutheran (alt-lutherisch) parish there. Fröbel's mother's name was Jacobine Eleonore Friederike (born Hoffmann). The church and Lutheran Christian faith were pillars in Fröbel's own early education. Oberweißbach was a wealthy village in the Thuringian Forest and had been known centuries long for its natural herb remedies, tinctures, bitters, soaps and salves. Families had their own inherited areas of the forest where herbs and roots were grown and harvested. Each family prepared, bottled, and produced their individual products which were taken throughout Europe on trade routes passed from father to son, who were affectionately called Buckelapotheker or "Rucksack Pharmacists". They adorned the church with art acquired from their travels, many pieces of which can still be seen in the renovated structure. The pulpit from which Fröbel heard his father preach is the largest in all Europe and can accommodate a pastor and 12 people, a direct reference to Christ's apostles.

Shortly after Fröbel's birth, his mother's health began to fail. She died when he was nine months old, profoundly influencing his life. In 1792, Fröbel went to live in the small town of Stadt-Ilm with his uncle, a gentle and affectionate man. At the age of 15 Fröbel, who loved nature, became the apprentice to a forester. In 1799, he decided to leave his apprenticeship and study mathematics and botany in Jena. From 1802 to 1805, he worked as a land surveyor.

On 11 September 1818, Fröbel wed Wilhelmine Henriette Hoffmeister (b. 1780) in Berlin. The union was childless. Wilhelmine died in 1839, and Fröbel married again in 1851. His second wife was Louise Levin.

=== Career ===
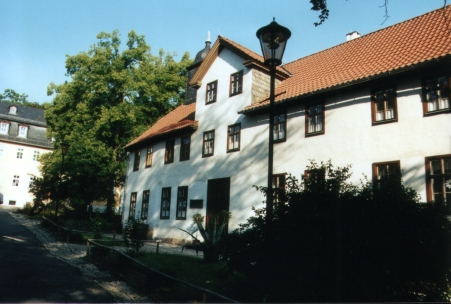
Allgemeine Deutsche Erziehungsanstalt in Keilhau, nowadays the Keilhau Free Fröbel School

Throughout his career, Fröbel would move between his interests in nature and in education. He began as an educator in 1805 at the Musterschule (a secondary school) in Frankfurt, where he learned about Johann Heinrich Pestalozzi's ideas. He later worked with Pestalozzi in Switzerland, where his ideas further developed. From 1806, Fröbel was the live-in teacher for a Frankfurt noble family's three sons. He lived with the three children from 1808 to 1810 at Pestalozzi's institute in Yverdon-les-Bains in Switzerland.

In 1811, Fröbel once again went back to school in Göttingen and Berlin, eventually leaving without earning a certificate. He became a teacher at the Plamannsche Schule in Berlin, a boarding school for boys, and at that time also a pedagogical and patriotic centre.

During his service in the Lützow Free Corps in 1813 and 1814 – when he was involved in two military campaigns against Napoleon – Fröbel befriended Wilhelm Middendorf, a theologian and fellow pedagogue, and Heinrich Langethal, also a pedagogue.

After Waterloo and the Congress of Vienna Fröbel found himself a civilian once again, and became an assistant at the Museum of Mineralogy under Christian Samuel Weiss during 1814–1816, studying and cataloging mineral crystals. He became fascinated with their structure, and later would write: "I continually proved to be true what had long been a presentiment with me, namely, that even in these so-called lifeless stones and fragments of rock, torn from their original bed, there lay germs of transforming, developing energy and activity. Amidst the diversity of forms around me, I recognised under all kinds of various modifications one law of development...And thereafter, my rocks and crystals served me as a mirror wherein I might descry mankind, and man’s development and history...Geology and crystallography not only opened up for me a higher circle of knowledge and insight, but also showed me a higher goal for my inquiry, my speculation, and my endeavour. Nature and man now seemed to me mutually to explain each other, through all their numberless various stages of development."

In 1816, he was offered a professorship in Stockholm, but he turned it down and instead founded the Allgemeine Deutsche Erziehungsanstalt (German General Education Institute) in Griesheim near Arnstadt in Thuringia. A year later, he moved the school to Keilhau near Rudolstadt. In 1831, work would be continued there by the other cofounders Wilhelm Middendorf and Heinrich Langethal.

In 1820, Fröbel published the first of his five Keilhau pamphlets, An unser deutsches Volk ("To Our German People"). The other four were published between then and 1823.

In 1826, he published his main written work, Die Menschenerziehung ("The Education of Man") and founded the weekly publication Die erziehenden Familien ("The Educating Families"). In 1828 and 1829, he pursued plans for a people's education institute (Volkserziehungsanstalt) in Helba (nowadays a constituent community of Meiningen), but they were never realized.

From 1831 to 1836, Fröbel once again lived in Switzerland. In 1831, he founded an educational institute in Wartensee. In 1833, he moved this to Willisau, and from 1835 to 1836, he headed the orphanage in Burgdorf, where he also published the magazine Grundzüge der Menschenerziehung (Features of Human Education). In 1836 appeared his work Erneuerung des Lebens erfordert das neue Jahr 1836 (The New Year 1836 Calls For the Renewal of Life).

He returned to Germany, dedicated himself almost exclusively to preschool child education and began manufacturing playing materials in Bad Blankenburg. In 1837, he founded a care, playing and activity institute for small children in Bad Blankenburg. From 1838 to 1840, he also published the magazine Ein Sonntagsblatt für Gleichgesinnte (A Sunday Paper for the Like-Minded).

In 1840, he coined the word kindergarten for the Play and Activity Institute he had founded in 1837 at Bad Blankenburg for young children, together with Wilhelm Middendorf and Heinrich Langethal. These two men were Fröbel's most faithful colleagues when his ideas were also transplanted to Keilhau near Rudolstadt. In 1840, the educator Emily Ronalds was the first British person to study Fröbel's approach and he urged her to transplant his kindergarten concepts in England.

Fröbel's ideas about childhood development and education were introduced to academic and royal circles through the tireless efforts of his greatest proponent, the Baroness (Freiherrin) Bertha Marie von Marenholtz-Bülow. Through her Fröbel made the acquaintance of the Royal House of the Netherlands, various Thuringian dukes and duchesses, including the Romanov wife of the Grand Duke von Sachsen-Weimar. Baroness von Marenholtz-Bülow, Duke von Meiningen and Fröbel gathered donations to support art education for children in honor of the 100th anniversary of the birth of Goethe. The Duke of Meiningen granted the use of his hunting lodge, called Marienthal (Vale of Mary) in the resort town of Bad Liebenstein for Fröbel to train the first women as Kindergarten teachers (Kindergärtnerinnen).

After suppressing the German revolutions of 1848–49, the Prussian government continued a crackdown on new ideas, banning kindergartens in 1851 (see below). This dismayed Fröbel, who died on 21 June 1852 in Marienthal, now a constituent community of Schweina. His grave can still be found in the cemetery at Schweina, where his widow, who died in Hamburg, was also buried on 10 January 1900.

== Philosophy ==
Fröbel's great insight was to recognise the importance of the activity of the child in learning. He introduced the concept of "free work" (Freiarbeit) into pedagogy and established the "game" as the typical form that life took in childhood, and also the game's educational worth. Activities in the first kindergarten included singing, dancing, gardening, and self-directed play with the Froebel Gifts. Fröbel intended, with his Mutter- und Koselieder – a songbook that he published – to introduce the young child into the adult world.

Fröbel's concept of a kindergarten grounded in self-directed play and games was grounded in his personal religious philosophy of panentheism. Fröbel considered play to be the natural way that children found their place in the universe. He outlined the means by which this was meant to take place, in particular having the child recognize the relation between the whole and its parts as a unity of opposites, and described the goal of the kindergarten as having children recognize their individual souls as Gliedganzes (his own coinage, meaning "linked into the whole") and humanity itself as Gliedganzes in relationship to the universe and God.

He designed the educational play materials known as Froebel Gifts, or Fröbelgaben, which included geometric building blocks and pattern activity blocks. Within Fröbel's panentheist philosophy, the Froebel Gifts allowed children to better perceive reality through understanding concepts of division, multiplicity (extension), and wholeness. Through the Gifts, the external world perceived by the child would properly reflect their own harmonious internal world, and thereby allow them to understand and comprehend the disharmonies outside their internal world. A book entitled Inventing Kindergarten, by Norman Brosterman, examines the influence of Friedrich Fröbel on Frank Lloyd Wright and modern art.

== Legacy ==
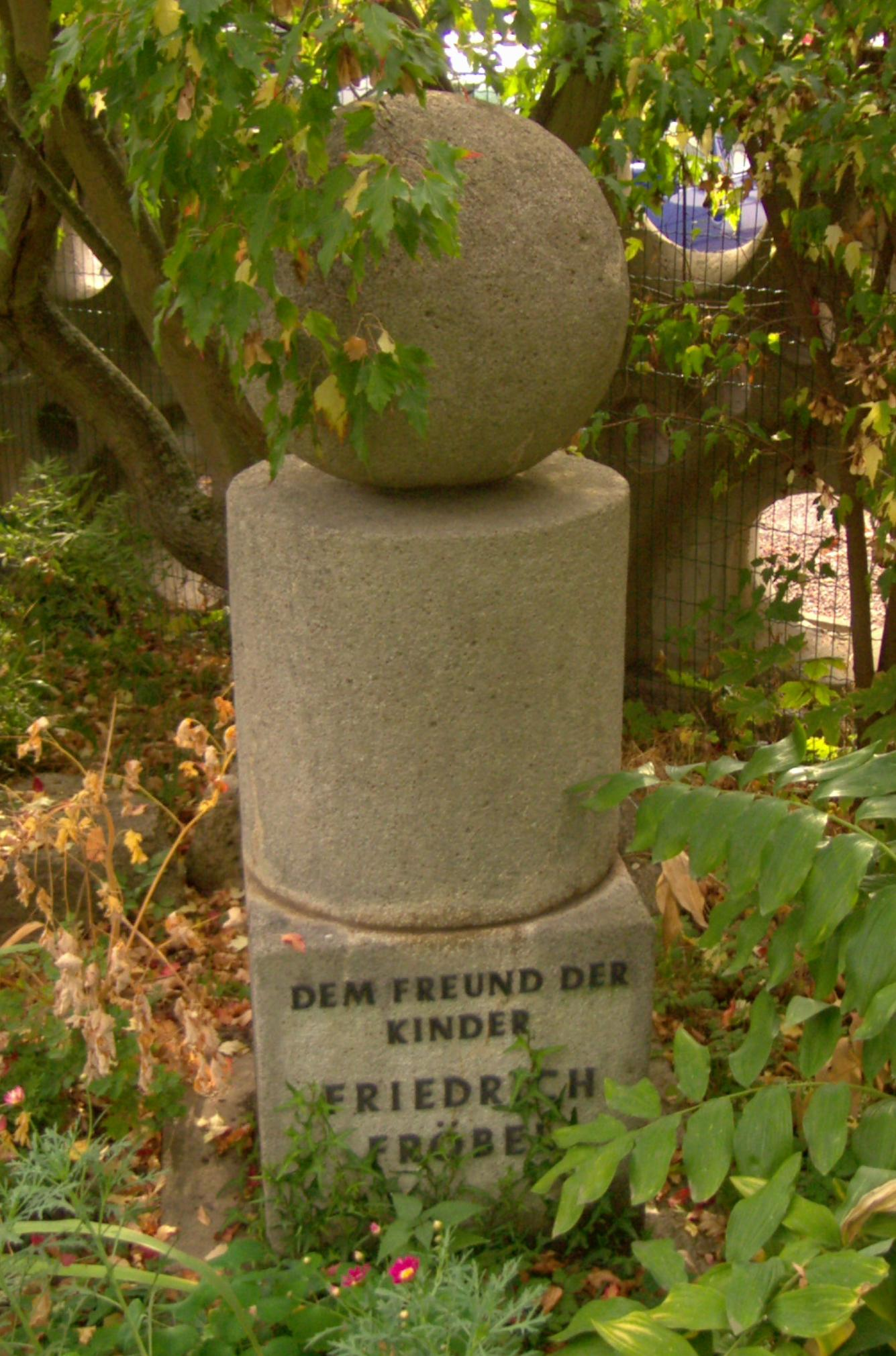
The Fröbel Memorial at the Fröbel Kindergarten in Mühlhausen, Thuringia, shows the pedagogical basic forms.

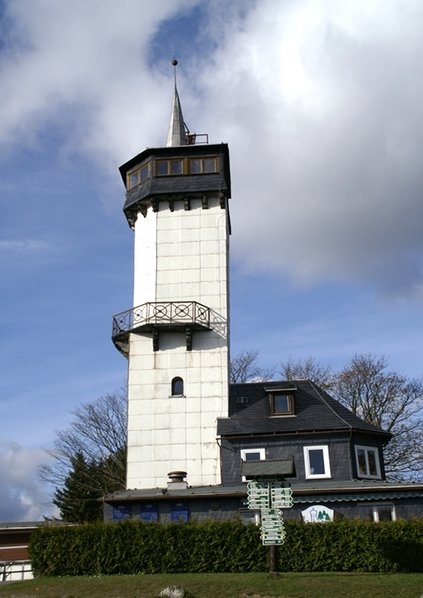
Fröbelturm near Oberweißbach

Fröbel's idea of the kindergarten had found appeal, but its spread in Germany was thwarted by the Prussian government, who objected to the way it was taught by his two nephews Karl and Julius. Fröbel had shared Pestalozzi's techniques with his brother, who raised his own children using these methods; Fröbel himself also taught Karl and Julius for a time. Karl and Julius were delighted with the educational program, but they resented Friedrich for usurping the family fortune. They developed their own, more ideological kindergarten experiments in Zurich and Hamburg and grew close to the 1848 revolutionaries. In 1850, Karl published a short book, Hochschulen für Mädchen und Kindergärten ("Girls' Colleges and Kindergartens"), which the Prussian government described as "part of a socialist system" and "encouraging children to become atheists." Prussia therefore banned all Fröbel-style kindergartens in 1851, a ban quickly adopted elsewhere in Germany. Fröbel protested in vain that he had no control over his nephews. To quote Karl August Varnhagen von Ense, "The stupid minister Karl Otto von Raumer has decreed a ban on kindergartens, basing himself on a book by Karl Fröbel. He is confusing Friedrich and Karl Fröbel." However, von Raumer's period notes show that he did not confuse Friedrich and Karl, but considered them to have similar educational programs, both of which appeared to embrace progressive education in a manner apparently concerning to the state following the 1848 uprisings. In particular, an explicitly liberal-democratic kindergarten in Nordhausen, Thuringia was in active contact with Friedrich. Ultimately, beyond the accusations directed at Karl, the specific reasons for banning kindergartens were not given.

The sudden ban caused a diaspora of teachers from Germany, spreading their ideas to other countries. Fröbel's student, Margarethe Schurz, founded the first kindergarten in the United States at Watertown, Wisconsin in 1856 (though another student, Louisa Frankenberg, founded a school based in Fröbel's methods in Columbus, Ohio in 1836, prior to Fröbel's coining of the term "Kindergarten".) In both schools, instruction was in the German language, and primarily served immigrant communities. She inspired Elizabeth Peabody, who went on to found the first English-language kindergarten in the United States, in Boston in 1860. The German émigré, Adolph Douai, had also founded a kindergarten in Boston in 1859, but had to close it after only a year. By 1866, however, he was founding others in New York City.

From the mid to late 19th century, many missionary women from Western countries disseminated Froebel's theory of kindergarten education across Japan. The prominent American missionary and Froebelian Annie L. Howe (1852–1943) was particularly influential through the establishment of her Glory Kindergarten teacher training school. Howe developed curricula specifically for Japanese students and trained hundreds of Japanese women to use Froebelian methods in kindergarten education.

The pedagogue, August Köhler, was the initiator and cofounder in 1863 of the Deutscher Fröbelverein (German Fröbel Association), first for Thuringia, out of which grew the Allgemeiner Fröbelverein (General Fröbel Association) in 1872, and a year later the Deutscher Fröbelverband (German Fröbel Federation). Köhler critically analyzed and evaluated Fröbel theory, adopted fundamental notions into his own kindergarten pedagogy and expanded on these, developing an independent "Köhler Kindergarten Pedagogy". He first trained kindergarten teachers in Gotha in 1857. In the beginning, Köhler had thought to engage male educators exclusively, but far too few applied.

Thekla Naveau founded, in October 1853, the first kindergarten in Sondershausen and on 1 April 1867, the first kindergarten after the Prussian ban was lifted in Nordhausen. Angelika Hartmann founded in 1864 the first kindergarten after Fröbel's model in Köthen, Anhalt. In 1908 and 1911, kindergarten teacher training was recognized in Germany through state regulatory laws.

Since then, there are many kindergartens in Germany named after Fröbel that continue his method. Many have sprung from parental or other private initiatives. The biggest Fröbel association, Fröbel e.V., today runs more than 100 kindergartens and other early childhood institutions throughout the country through the Fröbel-Gruppe.

Committed to Fröbel's legacy is also the Neuer Thüringer Fröbelverein (NTFV; New Thuringian Fröbel Association), and in particular to protecting the legacy. As well, the Association runs a school museum and the Fröbel Archive in Keilhau. Furthermore, it engages itself in Fröbel institutions worldwide (United States, United Kingdom, Japan). Through this network, the NTFV further continues one of the most prominent lines of modern pedagogy from the authentic "Fröbel town" of Keilhau. The Fröbel Diploma, now conferred by the Fröbel Academy in Nordhausen, can also be traced back to the NTFV.

In 1892, followers of Fröbel established a college of teacher education in South West London to continue his traditions. Froebel College is now a constituent college of Roehampton University and is home to the university's department of education. The University of Roehampton Library is also home to the Froebel Archive for Childhood Studies, a collection of books, archives, photographs, objects and multi-media materials, centring on Friedrich Fröbel's educational legacy, early years and elementary education. The Demonstration School, originally located at Colet Court, Kensington, has evolved into Ibstock Place School, Roehampton.

Today the Pestalozzi-Fröbel-Haus in Berlin continues to train nursery school teachers.

In 2005, the United States Senate declared a National Kindergarten Recognition Day on his birthday, April 21.

== Cultural influence ==
Fröbel's building forms and movement games are forerunners of abstract art as well as a source of inspiration to the Bauhaus movement. In Fröbel's honour, Walter Gropius designed the Friedrich Fröbel Haus. Many modernist architects were exposed as children to Fröbel's ideas about geometry, including Frank Lloyd Wright, Le Corbusier, and Buckminster Fuller.

== Works ==
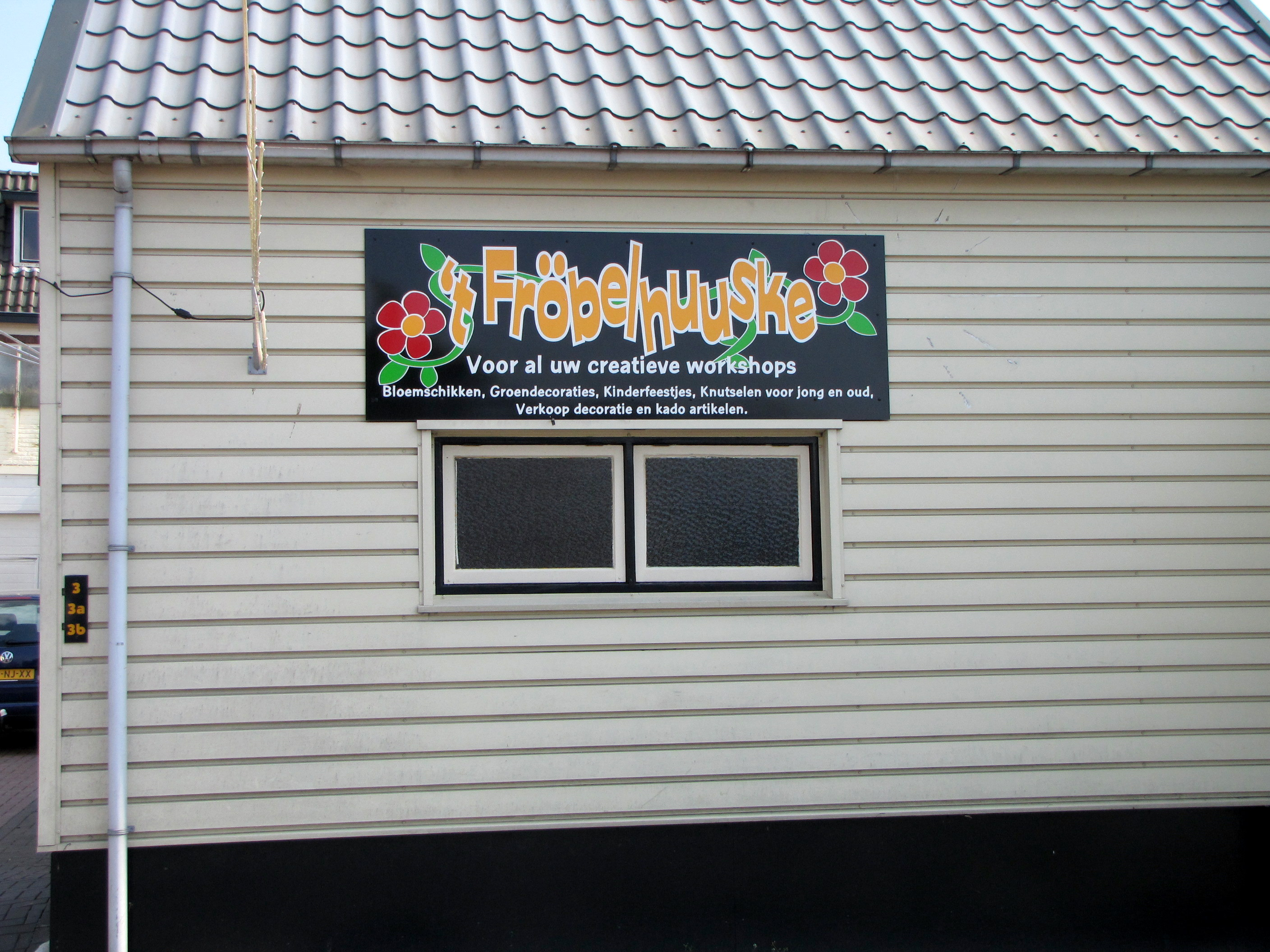
In the Netherlands, fröbelen means to be busy with arts and crafts, as promoted in a shop in Terborg.

(Selected from those of his time at Keilhau)

- An unser deutsches Volk [To Our German People]. Erfurt 1820.
- Durchgreifende, dem deutschen Charakter erschöpfend genügende Erziehung ist das Grund- und Quellbedürfnis des deutschen Volkes [Thorough Education, Fully Corresponding to the German Character, Is the Fundamental and Primary Need of the German People]. Erfurt 1821.
- Die Grundsätze, der Zweck und das innere Leben der allgemeinen deutschen Erziehungsanstalt in Keilhau bei Rudolstadt [The Principles, the Purpose, and the Inner Life of the General German Educational Institution in Keilhau near Rudolstadt]. Rudolstadt 1821.
- Die allgemeine deutsche Erziehungsanstalt in Keilhau betreffend [Concerning the General German Educational Institution in Keilhau]. Rudolstadt 1822.
- Über deutsche Erziehung überhaupt und über das allgemeine Deutsche der Erziehungsanstalt in Keilhau insbesondere [On German Education in General and on the General “German-ness” of the Educational Institution in Keilhau in Particular]. Rudolstadt 1822.
- Fortgesetzte Nachricht von der allgemeinen deutschen Erziehungsanstalt in Keilhau [Continued Report on the General German Educational Institution in Keilhau]. Rudolstadt 1823.
- Die Menschenerziehung, die Erziehungs-, Unterrichts- und Lehrkunst, angestrebt in der allgemeinen deutschen Erziehungsanstalt zu Keilhau [The Education of Man: The Art of Education, Instruction, and Teaching as Pursued in the General German Educational Institution at Keilhau. Volume One]. Keilhau-Leipzig 1826.
- Die erziehenden Familien. Wochenblatt für Selbstbildung und die Bildung Anderer [The Educating Families: Weekly Journal for Self-Cultivation and the Education of Others]. Keilhau-Leipzig 1826.
