= Maria Grey =

Maria Grey may refer to:

- Maria Santos Grey, All My Children character
- Maria Grey (novelist) (1782–1857), British novelist
- Maria Georgina Grey (1816-1906), educationalist and writer
- Maria Grey Training College, teacher training college

== See also ==
- Maria Emma Gray, English conchologist and algologist
- Maria Freeman Gray (1832–1915), American educator, feminist and socialist
