= Sheffield High School, South Yorkshire =

Sheffield High School

Location
- Rutland Park; Sheffield, South Yorkshire, S10 2PE; England
- 53.375°N 1.497°W

Information
- Type: Private day school
- Established: 1878
- Local authority: Sheffield
- Department for Education URN: 107166 Tables
- Head: Alexandra Wilson
- Staff: 80 full-time & 31 part-time
- Gender: Girls
- Age: 4 to 18
- Enrolment: 715
- Houses: Grey, Gurney, Shirreff, Stanley
- Colour: Navy Blue Jade Green
- Publication: Spotlight
- School fees: £9,216 – £12,975
- Website: http://www.sheffieldhighschool.org.uk/

Sheffield High School (Sheffield Girls') is a private girls' day school in Sheffield, South Yorkshire, England, part of the Girls' Day School Trust (GDST).

== History ==
Pupils playing in the snow whilst evacuated to Cliff College, Calver – 1940

In February 1878 a meeting was held at the Cutlers' Hall seeking support for a proposal to set up a girls' school in Sheffield. On 12 March 1878 the school accepted its first 39 pupils in its town-centre premises, the old Surrey Street Music Hall. The first head was Mary Alger and the founders were credited as Lady Stanley of Alderley, Maria Grey, Mary Gurney and Emily Shirreff.

In 1884 the school moved its premises to 10 Rutland Park.

In 1917 the school purchased Moor Lodge to be used as a girls' boarding house.

In 1939 with the onset of war, the school was evacuated to Cliff College, Calver, Derbyshire.

To celebrate the school's 125th Birthday in 2003, the school held a party. A calendar was made with a different photo for each month. Each pupil was given a bone china mug with a cartoon (called 'Girls Through The Ages') of different uniforms worn in the high school. A ceremony was held at the Octagon Centre, Sheffield on 11 March 2003.

== Recent changes to the school ==
In 2007 the school acquired No.4 Melbourne Avenue as a new infant building thus enlarging the Junior building to incorporate a new library. Also in 2007 the science block underwent a total refurbishment of the chemistry, physics and biology laboratories.

In 2006–7 the Art department within Moor Lodge was refurbished and extended; two new art rooms and a new ICT suite were created.

In the summer of 2010 an extension to the Sixth Form Centre was completed, providing additional classrooms and an Independent Learning Centre. Since then the Main reception area has been redesigned and a number of classrooms refurbished including an additional ICT suite.

In 2018, the school merged with Ashdell Preparatory school. The infant school moved to be housed at the former Ashdell site, whilst the Junior school spread over the former Junior and Infant site at Melbourne Avenue. In 2022 the school closed the Ashdell site and moved the Infant School back to Melbourne Avenue.

Also in 2018, headmistress Mrs Dunsford announced her retirement, to be replaced by Nina Gunson.

== Present day ==
The school premises are split between three sites; the site on Melbourne Avenue consists of the canteen, Infant and Junior School, the Sixth Form Centre which is located further up Melbourne Avenue overlooking the astroturf, and the main site at Rutland Park.

The Senior School is on Rutland Park, consisting of a large sports centre, Ash Grove, Moor Lodge, Main School and Trinity, which houses a gymnasium, fitness suite, cookery rooms and a drama studio.

The school has around 715 pupils aged four to eighteen. As of 2024, the school has examination pass rates of over 100% at A Level and 99.4% at GCSE.

Home matches are held at the school on Saturdays for both hockey and netball, and league matches are regularly played after school during the week.

== Buildings ==
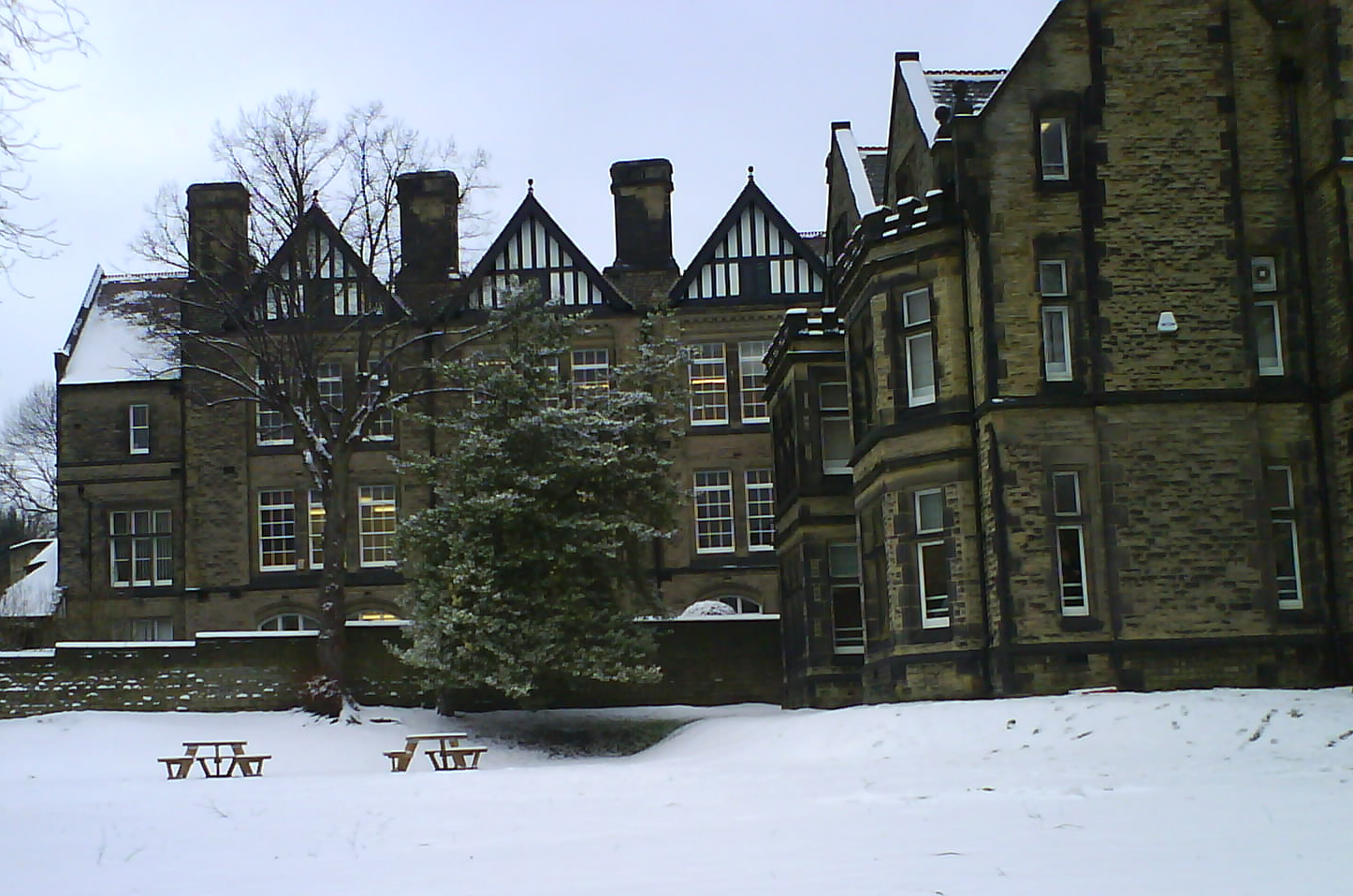
Moor Lodge in the snow

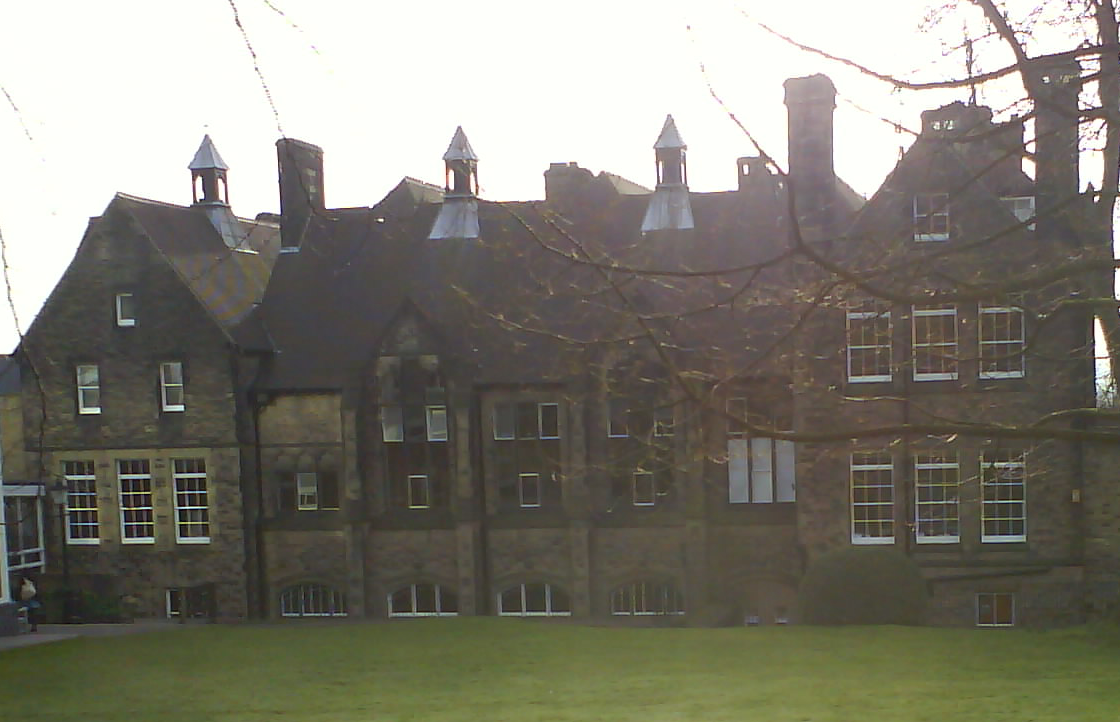
The main building of Sheffield High School

- Ash Grove (Music)
- Canteen
- Main Building (Maths, English, History, Languages)
- Moor Lodge (Year 11 base, Geography, ICT, RE, Business, Art)
- Trinity Building (Drama, PSHE, gymnastics, fitness)
- Sixth Form Centre
- Sports Hall
- The Infant and Junior School is housed at No. 4 and 5 Melbourne Avenue.

== Headmistresses ==
- Mary Alger (March–December 1878)
- Mrs E Woodhouse (1878–1898)
- Miss A E Escott (1898–1917)
- Mrs A Doncaster (1917–1919)
- Miss M Aitken (1919–1926)
- Miss D L Walker (1926–1936)
- Miss M E Macauley (1936–1947)
- Miss M E A Hancock (1947–1959)
- Miss M C Lutz (1959–1983)
- Diana M Skilbeck MBE (1983–1989)
- Margaret Houston (1989–2003)
- Valerie A Dunsford (2004–2018)
- Nina Gunson (2018–2024)
- Alexandra Wilson (2025–present)

== Houses ==
The Senior school is split into four houses named after the four founding members of the school Maria Grey, Mary Gurney, Emily Shirreff and Lady Stanley of Alderley. Their portraits are displayed on the stairs by the reception.

Numerous events and competitions are organised each year; these include netball, rounders and athletics events, art competitions, Year 7 Mathematics Day and House Charities Week. House captains for the year are appointed by the school's Senior Management Team following consultation with members of staff. Captains for winter and summer sports are also chosen and take a leading role in the annual sports day which is held at Woodburn Road Stadium.

== Fees ==
Annual fees at the school in 2025 ranged from £12,708 (for reception to year 2 pupils), to £17,875 (year 7 to year 13. Lunch is also mandatory from reception to year 7, incurring a further charge of £792 per year.

== Sixth form ==
Approximately 200 pupils attend years 12 and 13. Girls choose from 26 A Level options, including more specialist subjects such as Geology and Latin. In year 12, girls participate in the school's enrichment programme, Forging Futures, where they can choose which activities they wish to participate in including:

- The Young Enterprise Award
- Sport
- Assisting with Junior School classes
- Peer education (teaching younger girls PSHE)
- Helping with the school magazine
- Charity work
- Leadership studies

Sixth form pupils do not wear uniform and, upon signing out, may leave school during the day if they do not have any timetabled lessons—a privilege not granted to younger pupils. Each year has its own common room and a sixth form assembly is held in the hall once every two weeks. This extension was completed in the summer of 2010 and now provides additional teaching classrooms and an 'Independent Learning Centre' with a library and ICT facilities.

== Awards ==
- In 2023 the school won Independent Prep School of the Year at the Independent School Awards.
- In 2023 the school was named Sunday Times Independent Secondary School of the Year in the North by the Sunday Times.
- The school was awarded the prize for the most 'Environmentally Friendly Secondary School in Sheffield', at the 2009 Sheffield Telegraph Environment Awards.
- In 2008, the School became one of the first 15 schools in the UK to be fully accredited for the Go4it Award for which as school was deemed to demonstrate a culture of creativity, innovation, positive risk-taking, a 'can do' attitude and an adventure for learning. Presentation of Go4It badges are made at the end of each school term to girls that the school's pupil led committee feels have fulfilled the criteria.
- Winner of the Daily Telegraph/Norwich Union Award for Best Independent School for Sport 2005. The award was made at a ceremony in London in December 2006 and the School displays the logo related to this award within its website.
- The School won Independent School Awards in 2010, 2011, 2012 and 2013 and was shortlisted again in 2014. It has been nominated for a fifth award in 2015.

== School publications ==
Each year the school publishes an annual magazine, Spotlight. The magazine is published towards the end of the autumn term each year and features articles about recent school events, interviews with new or departing teachers, photos and artwork from the pupils.

== Awards ceremony ==
An annual awards ceremony is held at the Octagon Centre to celebrate the school's achievements. Awards are given for a range of sporting and academic achievements such as 'Loyalty to School Sport' and the 'Mrs Ames' Spoken English Prize'. Each year a speech is given by an external speaker, the Headmistress, the Chairman of Governors and a 'Vote of Thanks' is given by the incoming Head Girl.

== Notable former pupils ==
- Deborah Ann Barham, comedy writer
- A. S. Byatt, novelist
- Dehenna Davison, MP for Bishop Auckland
- Margaret Drabble, novelist, sister of A.S. Byatt
- Louise Haigh, Labour MP for the Sheffield Heeley constituency and Secretary of State for Transport
- Lydia Manley Henry, first female medical graduate of Sheffield University
- Joyce Himsworth, Independent Designer Silversmith
- Angela Knight
- Lorna Beatrice Lloyd, Second World War diarist
- Cicely Mayhew, UK's first female diplomat
- Sally Oppenheim-Barnes, British Peer, Privy Council, former Conservative M.P., former Conservative Minister for Consumer Affairs
- Mary Taylor Slow, physicist and first woman to take up the study of radio as a profession
- Olivia Smart, figure skater.
