= Shirreff =

Shirreff may refer to:

== People ==
- Alan Shirreff (1919–2006), English cricketer
- Charles Shirreff (painter) (c. 1750–c. 1830), deaf-mute Scottish miniaturist
- Charles Shirreff (businessman) (1768–1847), Canadian businessman and public official
- Emily Shirreff (1814–1897), British educationist and activist for women's education
- Erin Shirreff (born 1975), Canadian artist
- Hugh Shirreff (1918–1995), Canadian politician
- Jane Shirreff (1808–1883), Scottish soprano
- John Shirreff (1759–1818), Scottish agricultural writer
- Richard Shirreff (born 1955), British Army officer, general in the Iraq War (2003–2011)
- William Shirreff (fl. early 19th century), British Royal Navy officer

== Places ==
- Cape Shirreff, South Shetland Islands, Antarctica
- Shirreff Base, South Shetland Islands, Antarctica
- Shirreff Cove, South Shetland Islands, Antarctica
- Shirreff Hall, Dalhousie University residence hall, Halifax, Nova Scotia, Canada

== See also ==
- Shirreffs
