= Harriet Christina Newcomb =

English feminist, activist, and educationist (1854-1942)

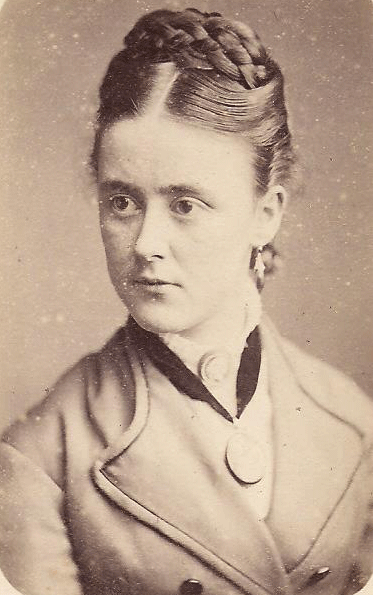
- Born: 20 May 1854; Bow, London, England
- Died: 15 April 1942 (aged 87); Watford, England
- Education: Maria Grey Training College
- Occupations: Educationist, suffragist
- Organization: Women's Freedom League

Harriet Christina Newcomb (20 May 1854 – 15 April 1942) was an English feminist, activist, and educationist. She was a proponent of progressive education and improved teacher training, in both Britain and Australia, and was an active member of the Women's Freedom League.

== Life ==
Harriet Christina Newcomb was born in Bow, London, the daughter of accountant William Newcomb and Harriet Sandell (née Walker). Newcomb, as was typical of her social class at that time, was educated at home.

While at Maria Grey Training College, Newcomb met Margaret Emily Hodge, with whom she would go on to have a fifty-year friendship. Encouraged by a Hodge family friend, Newcomb and Hodge travelled to Sydney, Australia in 1897, planning to work among the poor. They were recruited in order to establish a new training scheme, similar to the University of Cambridge's training scheme for teachers, which both women had obtained in England.

In Sydney, both women joined the Teachers' Association of New South Wales, where they worked on training courses for teachers at the primary and secondary school levels. Hodge became an honorary lecturer at the University of Sydney's Women's College, and the secondary teacher training courses were delivered there.

In 1900, Newcomb and Hodge opened Shirley School and Kindergarten, a girls' demonstration and training school on Edgecliff Road, Sydney. The school aimed 'to give pupils an education which shall develop individual power.' Newcomb, described as having 'a genius for organization', was the school principal and a teacher of French. The school opened with four students, growing to 100 by the end of the first year.

While in Australia, both Newcomb and Hodge were active in educational, feminist and suffragist activities. Both read papers at the Australasian Association for the Advancement of Science. Newcomb delivered addresses at the Sydney Ladies' Sanitary Association and the National Council of Women. In 1903, Newcomb became the inaugural vice-president of the Society for Child Study.

Following some years of ill health for Hodge, both women returned to England in October 1908, and settled together in Maida Vale. Here, they acted as 'unofficial representatives' for the suffrage movement in Australia, organising an Australian contingent for the 1910 suffrage procession, as well as giving illustrated lectures to prospective emigrants to Australia. In 1911, Newcomb became honorary secretary of the newly formed Australian and New Zealand Women Voters' Association.

During an extended visit to Australia in 1912–13, Newcomb and Hodge were instrumental in establishing an 'Imperial woman suffrage union,' the forerunner of the British Dominions Women's Suffrage Union.

During World War I, Newcomb worked in London for the Scottish Women's Hospitals for Foreign Service. In 1919, she joined the executive committee of the Women's Freedom League, having acted for many years as its literature secretary. She remained on the committee until 1922.

From 1927, Newcomb and Hodge lived separately but remained in close and frequent contact. In later life, Newcomb was influenced by the ideas of Rudolf Steiner and Anthroposophy. She believed that 'interest in everything seems naturally to grow as one ascends the mountain of life.'

With the outbreak of the Second World War, Newcomb moved to Watford. She died there on 15 April 1942.

== Legacy ==
After her death, friends and former pupils established a memorial fund (later the Newcomb-Hodge Fellowship) 'to foster the study of the aims and principles of true education'.

In 1949, Rosine Guiterman published a book about Newcomb and Hodge subtitled 'a short account of two pioneers in education'.
