= Mary Alger =

British headmistress

- Born: 4 February 1838; Diss
- Died: 17 March 1894 (aged 56); Dulwich
- Occupation: Headmistress
- Employer: Girls' Public Day School Company

Mary Jemima Alger (4 February 1838 – 17 March 1894) was a British headmistress. She was the founding head for three schools started by the Girls' Public Day School Company at Clapham, Sheffield and Dulwich. She had no formal academic qualifications but she created and ran three successful schools when girls were first being offered high school education.

== Life ==
Alger was born on 4 February 1838 at Diss, Norfolk, she was one of several daughters of John Alger, a corn merchant, and his wife Jemima (born Goldworth). Her only brother was the journalist John Goldworth Alger. Her brother went to school and he was writing for the Norfolk News at age sixteen. She had a varied private education and she taught in private schools. She became the first headmistress of the Girls' Public Day School Company (GPDSC) (later Trust) fifth school at Clapham when she was 37. The new middle school opened on Clapham Common on 3 May 1875. The GPDSC was transforming education for girls in Britain and Alger became one the trusts major assets, despite lacking the formal academic training of other heads. Her employers valued her but they moved her at short notice when she was showing some success. Heads of schools were valued but they would be replaced if the school started to flounder.

In 1878 she was moved to Sheffield taking with her Miss E.Woodhouse. The Sheffield High School thrived and Miss Woodhouse was left there as head as Alger was again moved the same year to another school planned by the company for Dulwich. She enjoyed thanks from the Sheffield students but it is Woodhouse who is usually credited as the first head.

The new girls' school opened in Dulwich in 1875 with less than 50 pupils. Within ten years there was 400. She was establishing education for girls but some only attended on a temporary basis. Exercise was avoided and the girls opted for botany and not for chemistry.

Alger died in Dulwich in 1894 in the house next door to the school. Dulwich High School continued until 1913 when it came under the control of the Church's School Company. It closed in 1938.
