= Mary Gurney =

Mother superior and school founder

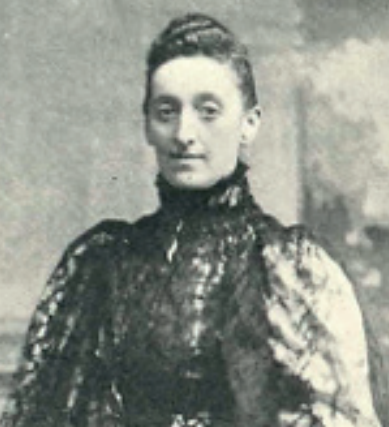
- Mary Gurney
- Born: 9 February 1836; London
- Died: 8 October 1917 (aged 81); Kensington
- Resting place: Putney Vale Cemetery
- Occupation: Pedagogue

Mary Gurney (1836 – 1917) was a British educationist who was one of the founders and funders of what became the Girls' Day School Trust. Her contribution is said to be "largely excluded from the historical record".

== Life ==
Gurney was born on 9 February 1836. Her parents were Emma (born Rawlings) and Joseph Gurney. Her father was one of parliament's shorthand writers and a biblical scholar who wrote for the Religious Tract Society. She was born at the family home in Denmark Hill in South London.

Gurney received an education from her father, from whom she inherited his appreciation of learning. She taught herself Latin, Greek, Italian and briefly went to a school based in Wincobank Hall, near Rotherham. She later learnt German and Spanish. She took charge of the education of her half-sisters, from her father's second marriage until she was replaced by a governess. She later became the secretary of Wandsworth's elementary school for girls organised by the British and Foreign School Society.

She was a key figure in the Women's Education Union and they decided to create a company to achieve their educational aims. They successfully presented the scheme at a public meeting at the Royal Albert Hall in June 1872. The new company was registered as the Girls' Public Day School Company with a nominal share capital of £12,000. The key figures in the creation of the GPDSC were Gurney, Maria Grey, Emily Shirreff and Lady Stanley.

In 1872 she published a history of Camden Collegiate Schools which was titled Are We to Have Education for Our Middle-class Girls?. The book had an introduction by Maria Grey.

In 1879 she left Tyndale Lodge, near Wimbledon, where she had lived with her father till he died. She moved to live in Kensington, with her sister Amelia.

She and the MP William Henry Stone, who was the chairman of the Girl's Public Day School Company, gave evidence to the Royal Commission on Secondary Education in 1894.

She died in Kensington on 8 October 1917. She was buried in Putney Vale Cemetery. She left £1,000 to fund a GPDSC scholarship. Research has found that Gurney's substantial contribution to education has been "largely excluded from the historical record".
