= Joseph Gurney (disambiguation) =

Joseph Gurney (1804–1879) was a British shorthand writer and biblical scholar.

Joseph Gurney may also refer to:

- Joseph Gurney (1744–1815), shorthand writer of legal proceedings and editor
- Joseph John Gurney (1788–1847), minister, banker, brother of Elizabeth Fry, and father of John Henry Gurney
