= Guiterman =

Guiterman is a surname. Notable people with the surname include:

- Arthur Guiterman (1871–1943), American writer known for his humorous poems
- Rosine Guiterman (1886–1960), Australian activist, teacher, poet and humanitarian
