= Margaret Emily Hodge =

British educator and suffragist (1858–1938)

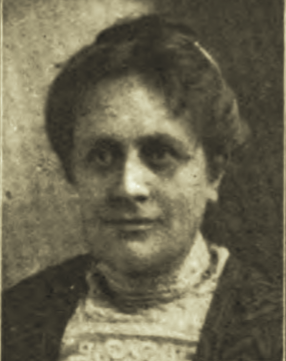
- Hodge at the 3rd International Congress of Women in Toronto, Canada, 1909
- Born: 8 January 1858; Campden Hill, Kensington, London, England
- Died: 13 August 1938 (aged 80); Finchley, London, England
- Burial place: Kensal Green Cemetery, London, England
- Education: University of Cambridge; Maria Grey Training College
- Occupations: educator, suffragist, pacifist and urban district councillor
- Employer(s): Bishopsgate School for Girls; Maria Grey Training College; London Working Women's College; The Women's College, University of Sydney; Shirley School and Kindergarten
- Organization(s): Womanhood Suffrage League of New South Wales (WSL); National Council of Women of Australia (NCW); International Peace Society; Australian and New Zealand Women Voters' Committee (ANZWVC); Women's Political and Educational League; British Dominions Woman Suffrage Union (BDWSU); Women's Freedom League (WFL)

Margaret Emily Hodge (8 January 1858 – 13 August 1938) was a British educator, suffragist, pacifist and urban district councillor who established teacher training courses in Australia.

She was a member of feminist organisations including the Womanhood Suffrage League of New South Wales (WSL), the National Council of Women of Australia (NCW), the Peace Society, the Australian and New Zealand Women Voters' Committee (ANZWVC), the British Dominions Woman Suffrage Union (BDWSU) and the Women's Freedom League (WFL).

== Early life ==
Hodge was born on 8 January 1858 at Campden Hill, Kensington, London into a large and wealthy middle-class family. She was the fifth daughter and one of seven children of actuary William Barwick Hodge and Penelope Sarah Hodge (née Smith).

Hodge was educated at home, then gained a higher local certificate from the University of Cambridge. In 1879, she enrolled at Maria Grey Training College for Teachers in Bishopsgate, where she met her friend Harriet Christina Newcomb (1854–1942). They would go on to have a fifty-year friendship.

Hodge taught at Bishopsgate School for Girls, then lectured at both Maria Grey Training College and the London Working Women's College. She was known as a gifted teacher of English, German and history and as a follower of Froebelian approaches to education.

== Australia ==
=== Teaching ===
With her friend Newcomb, Hodge emigrated to Sydney in September 1897 to establish teacher training courses on the invitation of Professor Walter Scott of the Teachers' Association of New South Wales. Hodge and Newcomb founded Shirley School and Kindergarten, a girls' demonstration and training school, on Edgecliff Road, Sydney in January 1900. Trainee kindergarten teachers were often new immigrants that had arrived in the Australian colony from Britain. Shirley School had 100 students by the end of the first year and pupils included Kathleen Ussher and Eunice Mort. Hodge wrote for the school's Shirley magazine.

Shirley School and Kindergarten incorporated the Swedish system of gymnastics devised by Pehr Henrik Ling and was one of the first female schools in Australia with a permanent cricket team. Supporting the less fortunate was fundamental to the institution, with "service for others" considered "the noblest part of self education." Funds raised at school plays were given to the New South Wales Home for Incurables, an annual Christmas party was held for local poor children and warm garments were sewn for the Surrey Hills Free Kindergarten pupils.

Hodge then wrote the training courses for primary and secondary teachers for The Women's College of the University of Sydney, where she was appointed an honorary lecturer in the theory and practice of education.

=== Women's suffrage ===
Hodge and Newcomb were active suffragists in Australia. They both joined the Womanhood Suffrage League of New South Wales (WSL) and the National Council of Women of Australia (NCW). Hodge and Australian suffragist Vida Goldstein gave papers at the NCW congress in 1904 and both Hodge and Newcomb read papers at the Australasian Association for the Advancement of Science (ANZAAS). Hodge additionally worked alongside Australian suffragist Rose Scott on behalf of female prisoners.

In 1902, Hodge became ill and returned to England. She was elected a vice-president of the Australian Women's Political and Educational League in absentia and had returned to Australia by 1903. In 1907, Hodge was elected vice-president of the New South Wales branch of the Peace Society. Hodge became unwell again, so both she and Newcomb returned to Britain in October 1908, visiting educational institutions in Japan and the United States en route home.

== Later life in England ==
Hodge and Newcomb settled together in Maida Vale, Paddington, London. During 1910, Hodge gave talks to encourage young British people to settle in "White Australia", describing the flora, fauna and "aboriginals" of the colony.

Hodge and Newcomb continued to be involved in the Australian women's suffrage movement from Britain. They organized an Australian contingent to march in the suffrage procession in London on 18 June 1910. They were the Australian delegates to the Sixth Conference of the International Woman Suffrage Alliance, held in Stockholm, Sweden, in June 1911.

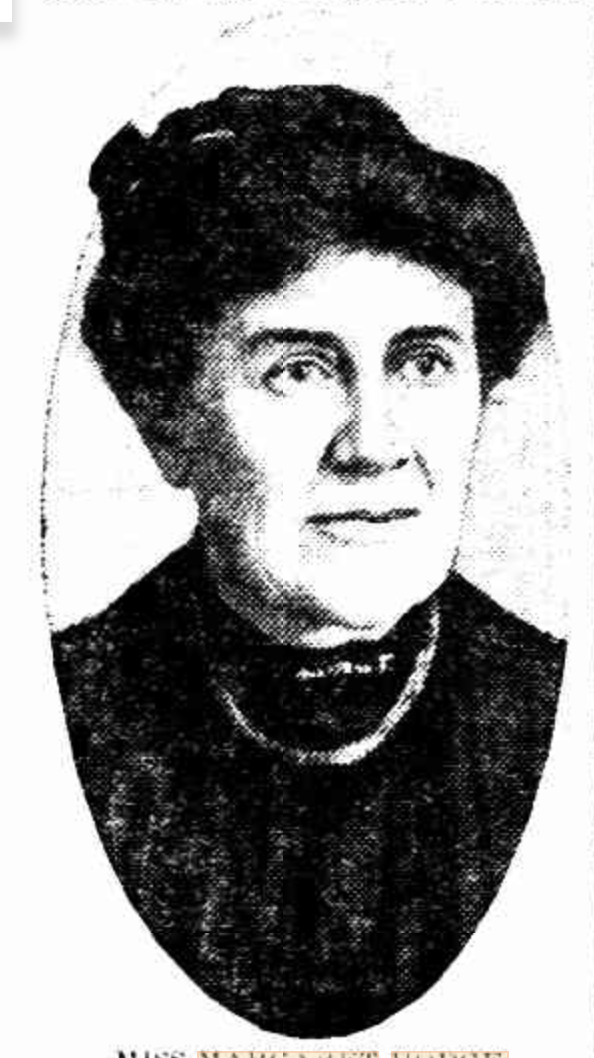
Margaret Emily Hodge in Australia in 1913

Newcomb was honorary secretary of the Australian and New Zealand Women Voters' Committee (ANZWVC), established in London in 1911, and Hodge was also a member of the ANZWVC executive committee. They travelled across the British Empire to speak on Australian women's suffrage, including to South Africa in 1912, Australia and New Zealand in 1912 and 1913 and Canada in 1914. While in Australia, Hodge supported Vida Goldstein's election campaign for the Federal seat of Kooyong in Victoria. Also in 1914, Hodge travelled with suffragette Dorothy Pethick to speak in Chicago, Illinois.

Later in 1914, Hodge was one founders of the British Dominions Woman Suffrage Union (BDWSU) and organised its first conference in London, during July 1914. The BDWSU was established for Australian, British and New Zealand women to help white Canadian and South African women gain the right to vote. Members of the advisory committee included Maud Arncliffe Sennett, Adeline Chapman, Milicent Fawcett, Catherine Marshall, Sylvia Pankhurst and Emmeline Pethick-Lawrence.

Hodge wrote several articles for the English suffragist newspaper The Vote in 1914, where she outlined how the BDWSU aimed to demonstrate to the British Empire how enfranchised women of the colonies were exemplars of the progressive "new world" being created by admitting women to hold equal citizenship. British Indian women were included, but were on the periphery of the Union. Hodge and Newcombe retired from the BDWSU in 1924 and by 1925 it had evolved to become the British Commonwealth League of Women.

Newcomb and Hodge had initially supported the Women's Social and Political Union (WSPU) when they returned to England, but moved away from the WSPU due to the "militarism" of the Pankhurst family during World War I. In 1918, Hodge was elected to the Women's Freedom League (WFL) executive committee. After the Amritsar Massacre in Punjab, British India on 13 April 1919, Hodge chaired a meeting of the WFL to protest the British and Indian government's responses to the events and to object to the treatment of Indian women.

In 1919, Hodge was elected an urban district councillor for Hendon with the Labour Party.

== Death and legacy ==
From 1927, Newcomb and Hodge lived separately but remained in close and frequent contact. Hodge lived with her siblings then in St Audrey's Nursing Home in Finchley, London.

Hodge died on 13 August 1938 in the nursing home. She was buried in Kensal Green Cemetery.

In 1949, Rosine Guiterman published a book about Newcomb and Hodge subtitled "a short account of two pioneers in education."

Former pupils and friends set up a memorial fund, which became the Newcomb-Hodge Fellowship at the University of Sydney's Department of Education in 1950.
