= John Goldworth Alger =

John Goldworth Alger (1836–1907) was an English journalist and author.

== Life ==
Born at Diss, Norfolk, and baptised on 7 August 1836, he was the only son of John Alger, a corn merchant there, by his wife Jemima, daughter of Salem Goldworth of Morning Thorpe, Norfolk. His younger sister was the headmistress Mary Jemima Alger. Educated at Diss, Alger became a journalist at the age of 16. At first he wrote for the Norfolk News, and afterwards transferred his services to the Oxford Journal.

In 1866 Alger joined the parliamentary reporting staff of The Times, and after eight years of that job was sent to Paris in 1874 to act as assistant to Henri Opper de Blowitz, the Times correspondent there. He stayed for 28 years.

In 1902 Alger retired from The Times on a pension, and settled in London. He died unmarried at 7 Holland Park Court, Addison Road, West Kensington, on 23 May 1907.

== Works ==
Alger researched the topographical history of Paris, and English participation in the French Revolution. His major publications were:

- Englishmen in the French Revolution, 1889.
- Glimpses of the French Revolution, 1894.
- Paris in 1789-94; Farewell Letters of Victims of the Guillotine, 1902.
- Napoleon's British Visitors and Captives, 1904.

Alger also published The Paris Sketch Book (a description of contemporary Parisian life) (1887), contributed historical articles to magazines, and was a contributor to the Dictionary of National Biography.

== Notes ==
Attribution

This article incorporates text from a publication now in the public domain: Lee, Sidney, ed. (1912). "Alger, John Goldworth". Dictionary of National Biography (2nd supplement). Vol. 1. London: Smith, Elder & Co.
