= Kensington High School =

Kensington High School may refer to:

== Australia ==
- Kensington Intermediate Senior High School, a secondary school in Kensington, Prince Edward Island

== Canada ==
- Kensington Community High School, a high school in Melbourne, Victoria

== United Kingdom ==
- Kensington High School was a Girls school in Kensington destroyed by a bomb in 1941, survived in part by Kensington Preparatory School.

== United States ==
- Kensington High School (Buffalo, New York), a former high school in Buffalo, New York
- Kensington High School (Philadelphia), a historic high school building in Philadelphia, Pennsylvania
- Hoffman-Kensington High School, a former high school in Hoffman, Minnesota
