= Catherine Gray =

Catherine Gray may refer to:

- Catherine Gray, Lady Manners (1766–1852), or Grey,Anglo-Irish aristocrat and poet
- Catherine Willis Gray (1803–1867) was an American socialite and preservationist

== See also ==
- Catherine Ebert-Gray (born 1955), American diplomat
- Catherine Maria Grey (1798–1870), British novelist
- Lady Katherine Grey (1540–1568), younger sister of Lady Jane Grey
