= Clotilde von Wyss =

Swiss-born English educator

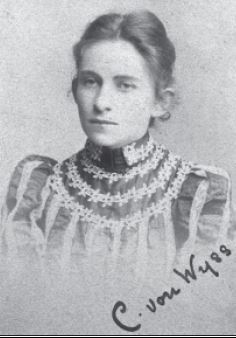
- Born: 1871; Switzerland
- Died: 7 November 1938 (aged 66–67)
- Other name: Mehr Licht
- Employer(s): St. George's High School; North London Collegiate School; London Day Training College
- Organization(s): School Nature Study Union; Linnean Society of London; Hermetic Order of the Golden Dawn

Clotilde Rosalie Regina von Wyss (1871 – 7 November 1938) was a Swiss-born English school teacher, pedagogue, and nature educator. She was one of the founding members of the School Nature Study Union in 1903 and edited its journal until her death.

== Life and work ==
Von Wyss was born in Switzerland and after education in Zurich she studied at North London Collegiate School from 1884 to 1891. She went to Maria Grey College, Brondesbury and received a Cambridge Teachers' Certificate with distinction. She then taught at St. George's High School from 1894 to 1897, where one of her favourite students was Marie Stopes.

While teaching, von Wyss also studied at Heriot-Watt College in Edinburgh, Scotland, where she was influenced by Arthur Thomson. She taught at biology from 1897 at the North London Collegiate School and in 1903 she joined the London Day Training College, where she spent the next thirty years in using novel educational approaches to teach biology. Starting part-time under the vice principal Margaret Punnett, von Wyss taught biology, hygiene, nature study and art. Von Wyss also gave lessons on the BBC which influenced science teachers.

Von Wyss helped found the School Nature Study Union in 1903 which began after Claude Hinscliff gave a call to teachers interested in nature education. Supporters of the Union included Lord Avebury, Patrick Geddes, J. Arthur Thomson, Lloyd Morgan, L.C. Miall and J. H. Cowham. Other teachers included Kate Hall and Lilian Clark. The union organized Saturday excursions for teachers to collect specimens to use in their teaching. Von Wyss became the editor of the School Nature Study Journal.

In 1914 von Wyss was elected Fellow of the Linnean Society. She was also a member of the Hermetic Order of the Golden Dawn from 1897 with the German pseudonym Mehr Licht ("more light"). Von Wyss advised the Gaumont British Film Corporation in 1936 when they were making a film on the life of Formica rufa ants as part of the Secrets of Nature series, with her knowledge considered "critical."

Teaching illustrations by Von Wyss (1934)

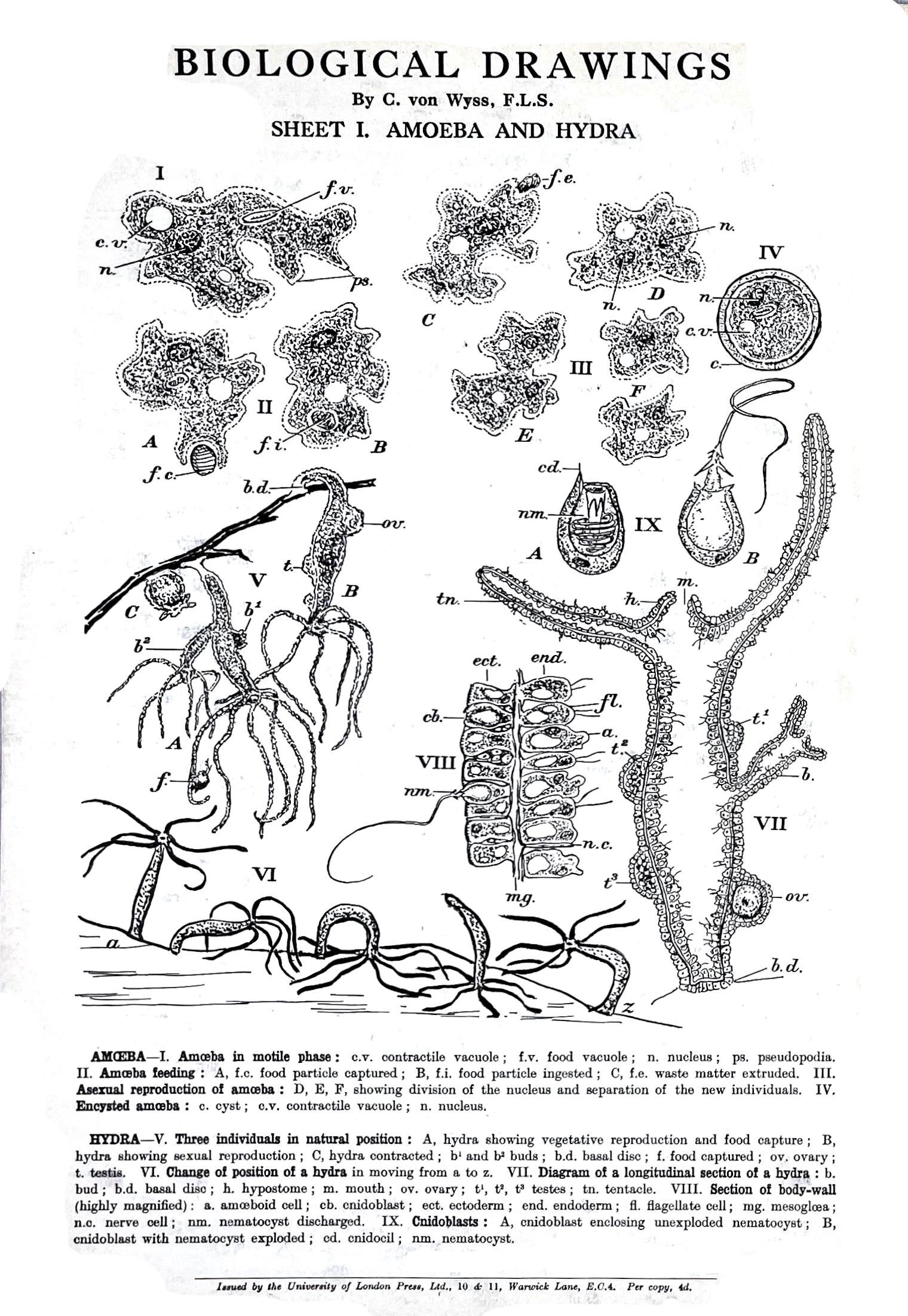

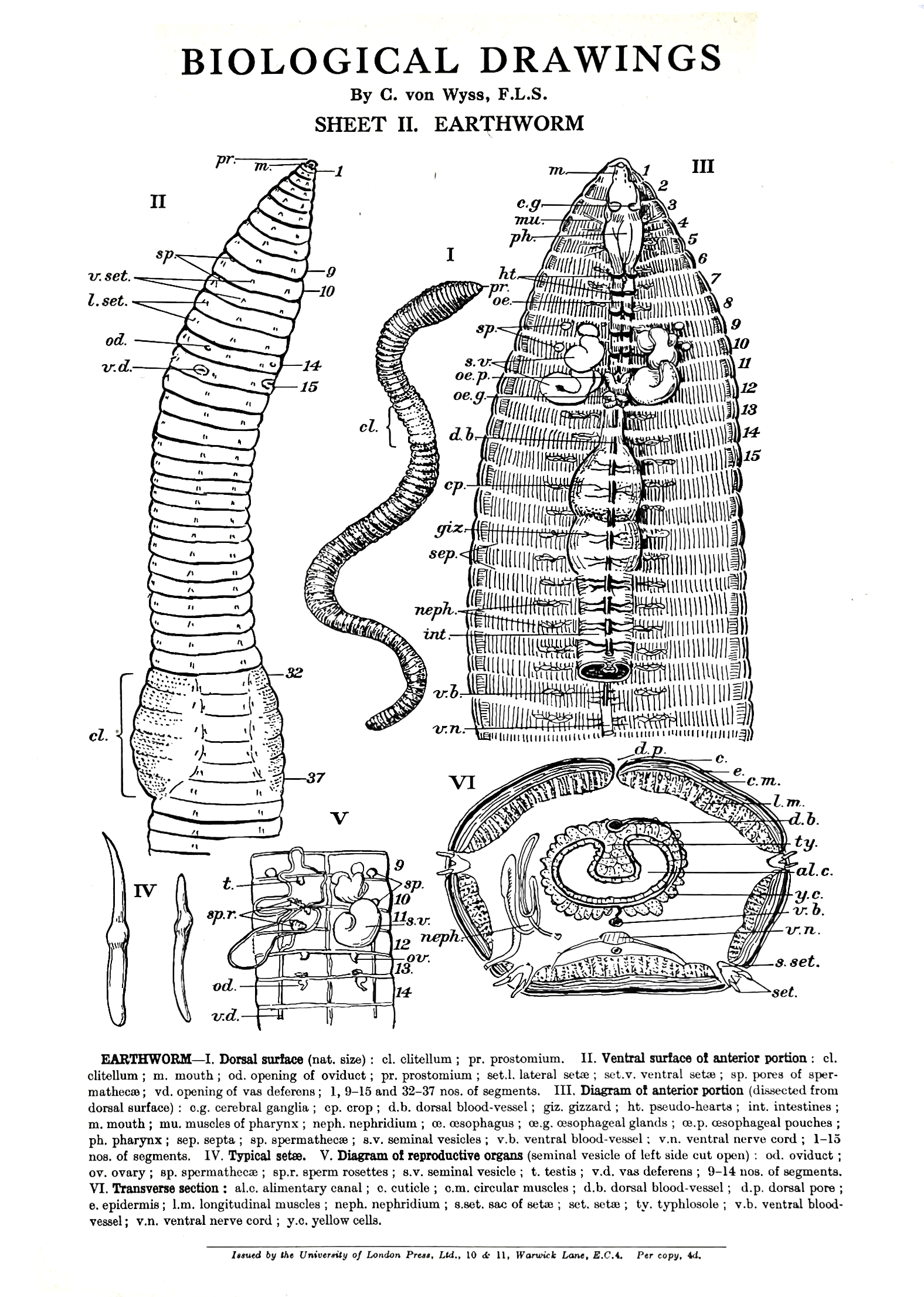

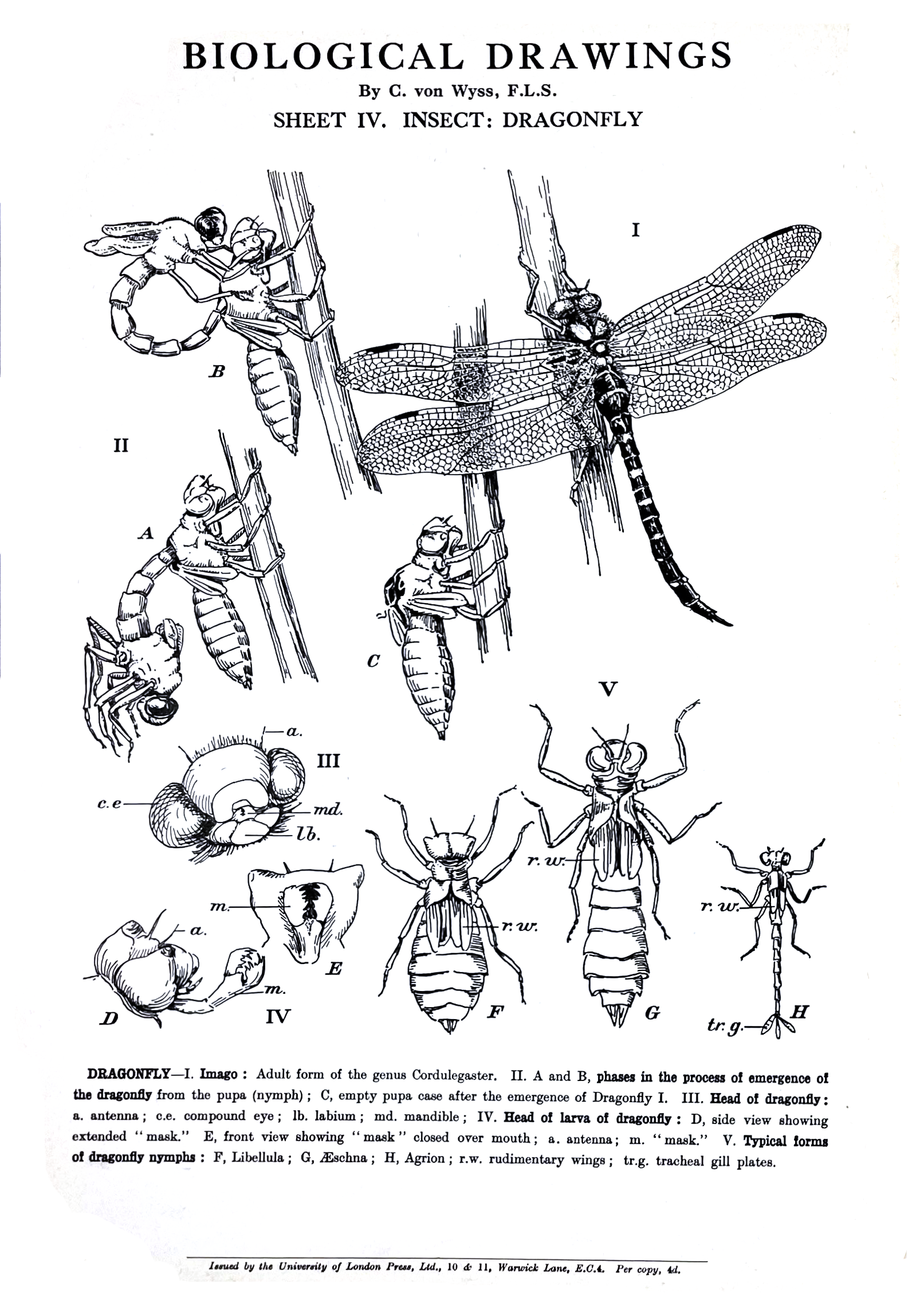

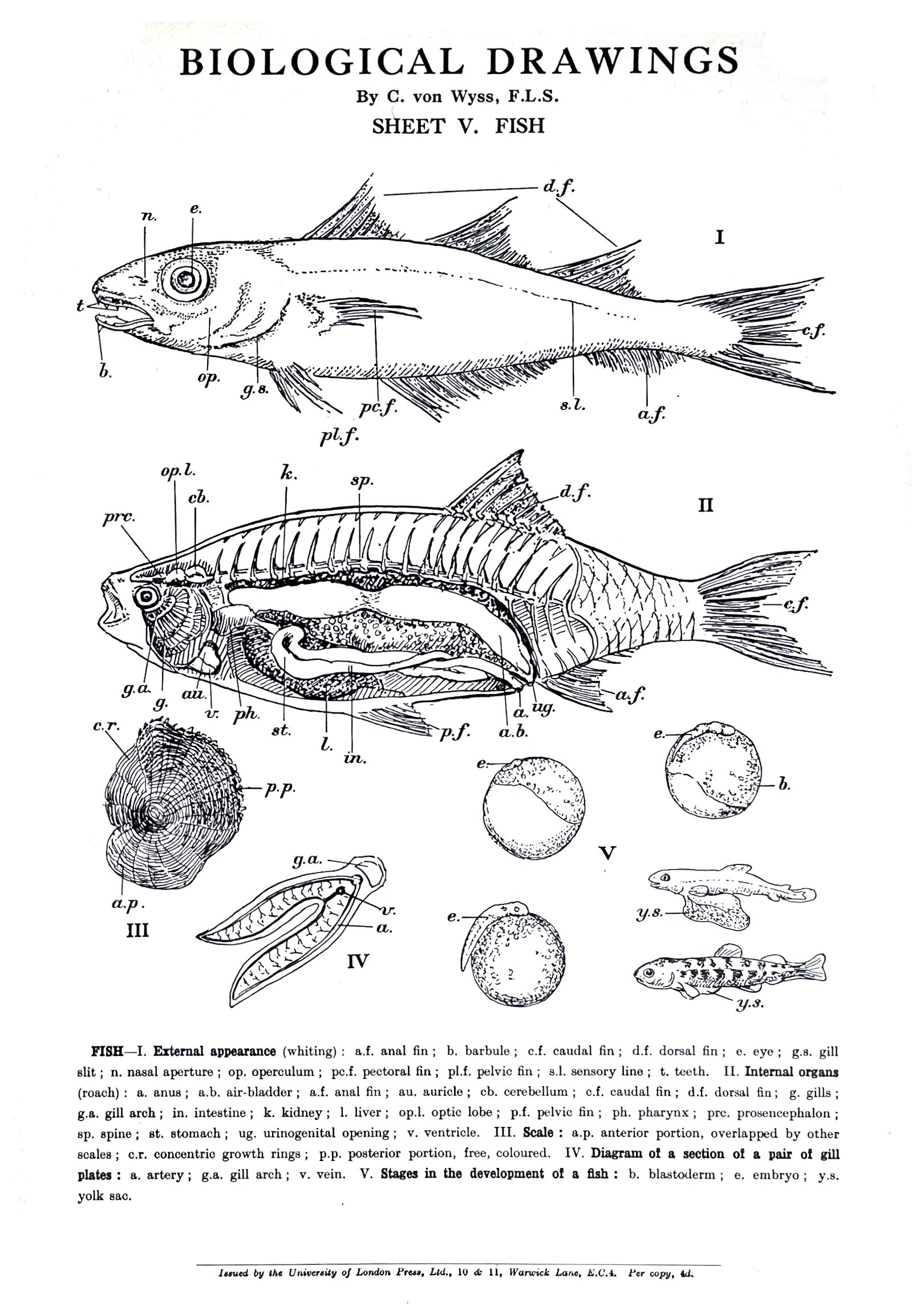

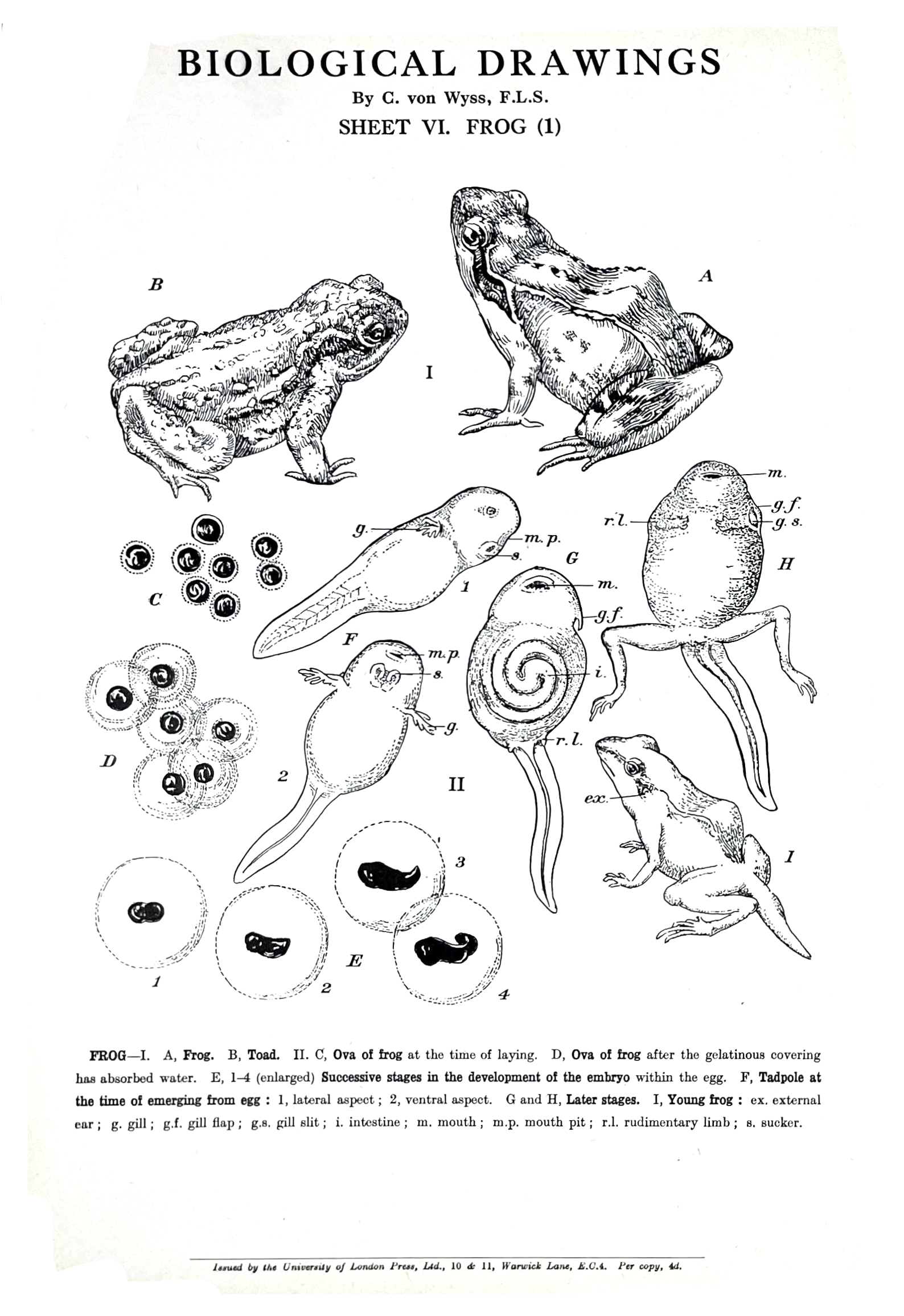

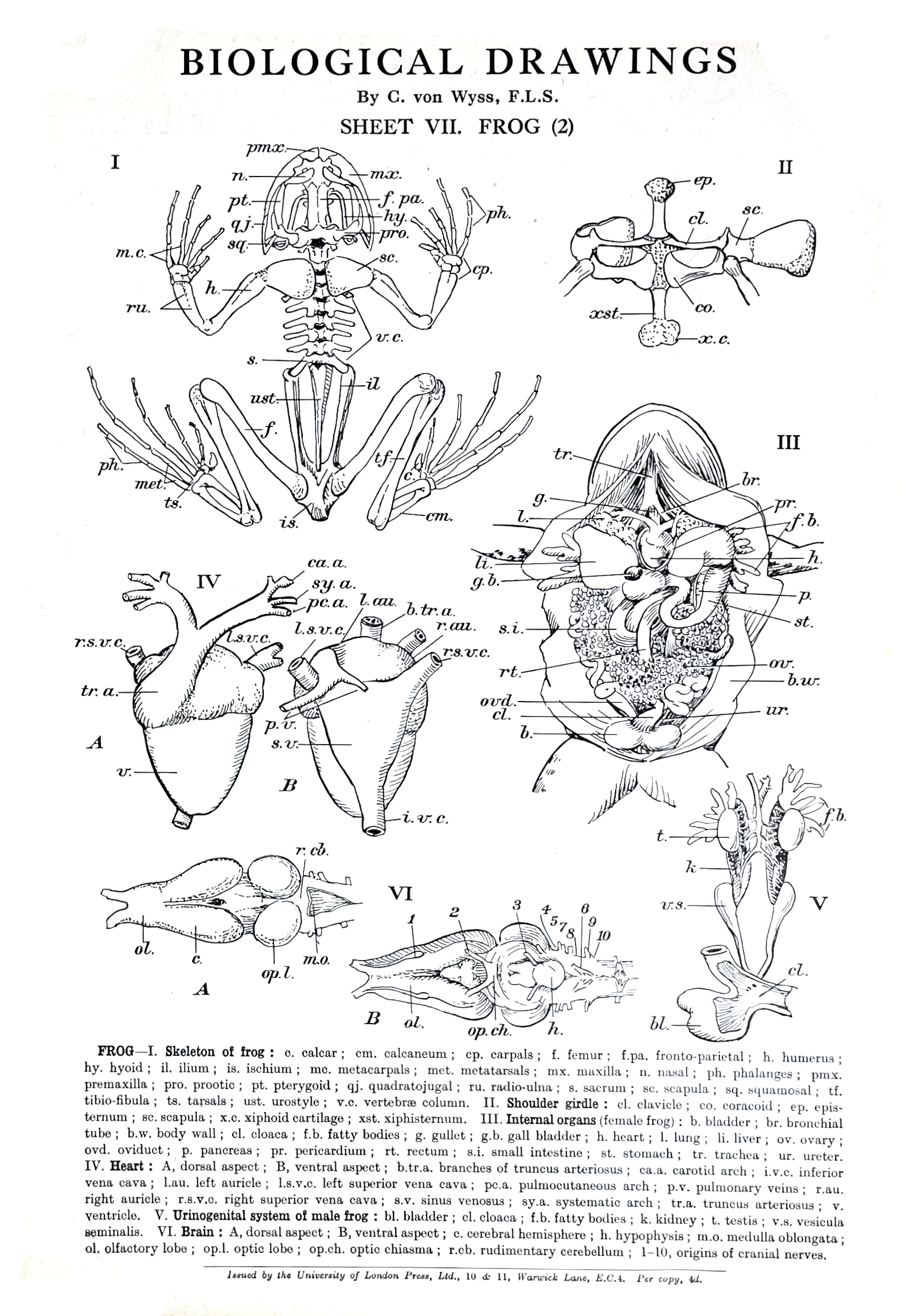

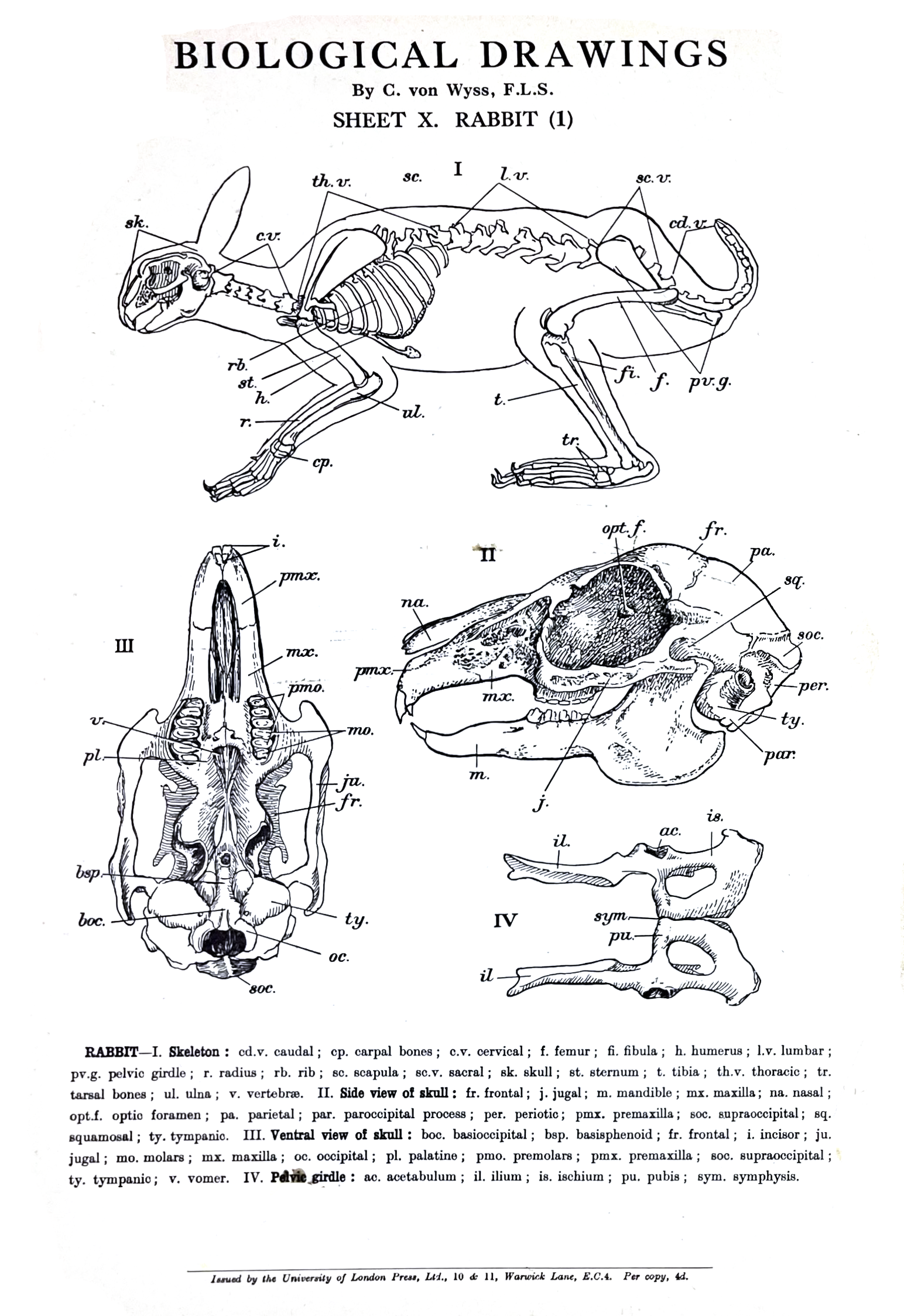

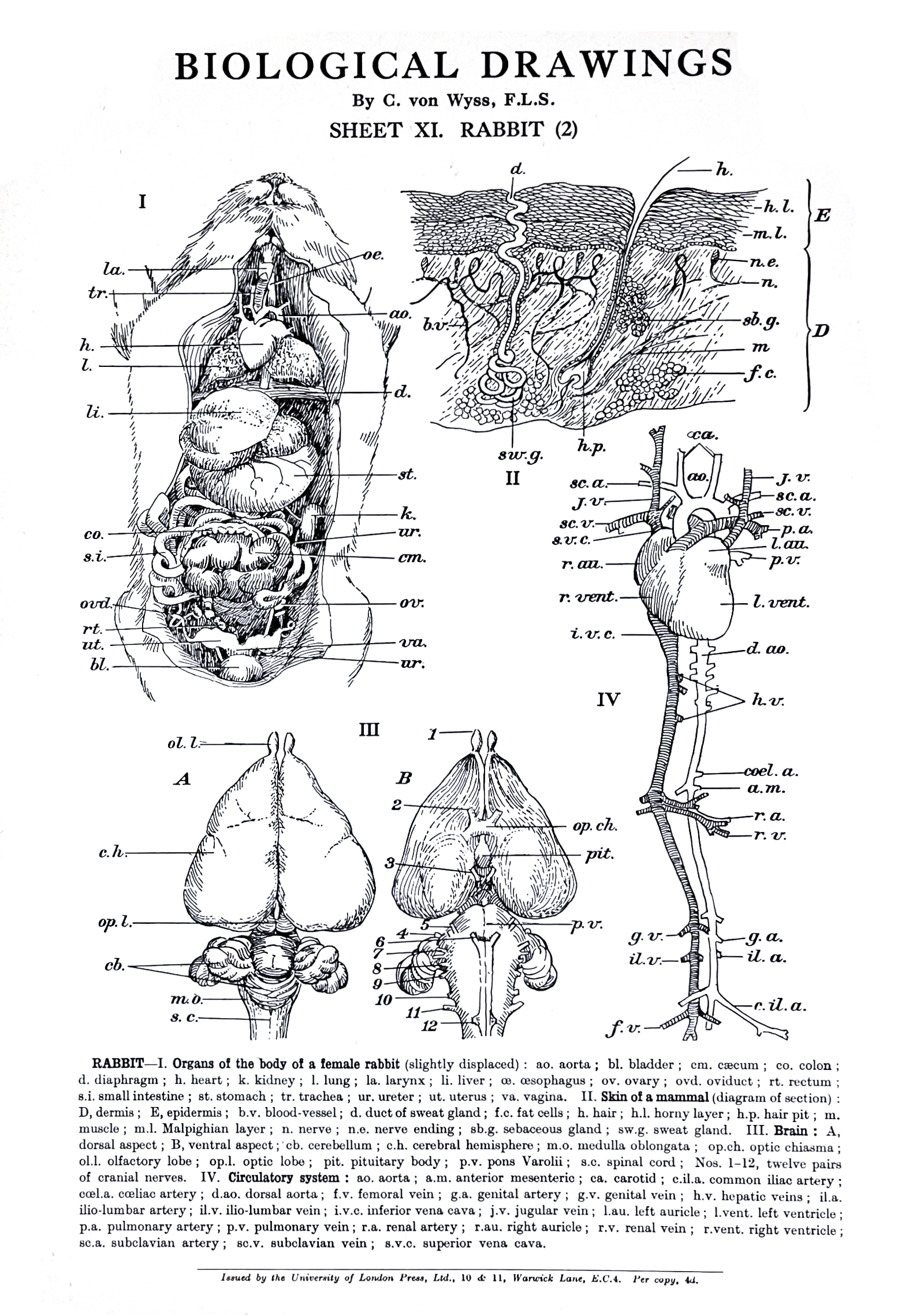
