= Lorna Lloyd =

British school teacher and World War II diarist

Lorna Beatrice Lloyd (1914–1942) was a British school teacher. She became known after her death for her World War II era diary, which chronicled life in wartime Britain. The diary was posthumously published in 2019 and Lloyd became the subject of articles, a podcast series, and an exhibition at Malvern Museum.

== Biography ==
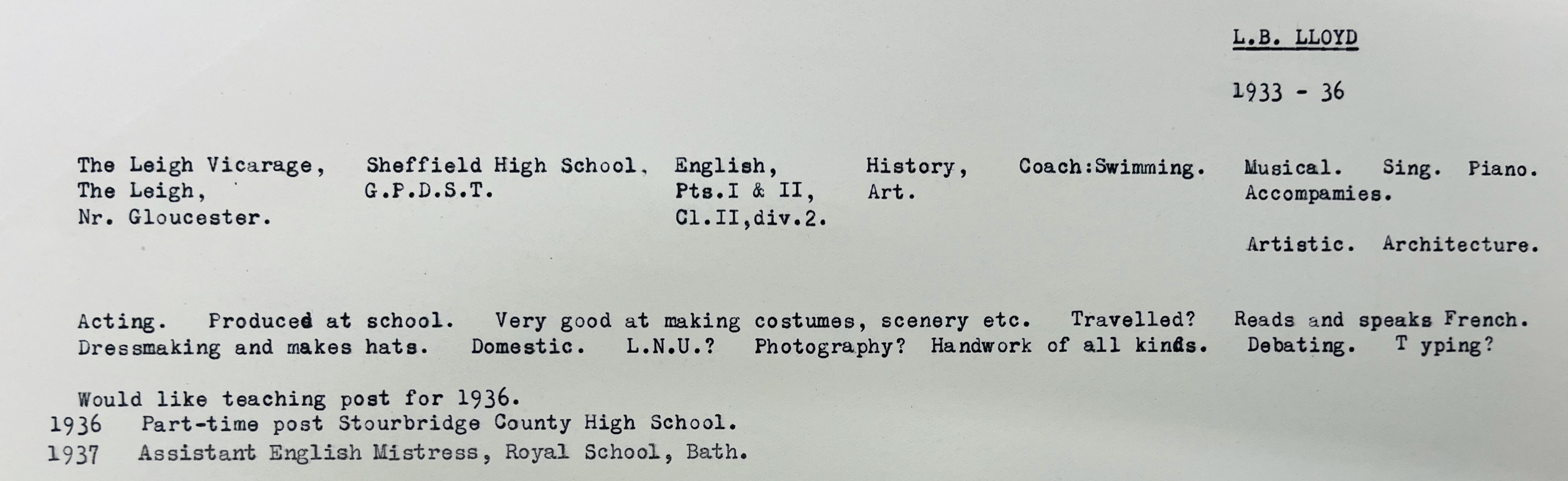
Archived details of Lorna Lloyd held at Girton College

Lloyd was born on 7 January 1914, the daughter of Albert Edward Lloyd and Alice Ethel Lloyd. She had one brother, Theo. Between 1914 and 1933, the family lived in Bristol, Stirling, Ilford, and Sheffield. Lloyd attended Sheffield High School.

In September 1939, 25 year-old Lloyd was living in Malvern in Worcestershire in the English Midlands. Between 1 September 1939 and 4 January 1941, she wrote 106 diary entries offering commentary on the war. It included first-hand experience of rationing, reception of child evacuees, and billeting of armed personnel in civilians' houses. Lloyd also reflected on the evacuation of Dunkirk, the Battle of Britain, the sinking of the Benares and the bombing of Coventry.

Lloyd received treatment at Gloucester Infirmary between 1939 and 1942. However, her condition deteriorated and she died on 2 February 1942, a month after her 28th birthday. The cause of death was certified as heart failure and cancer.

== Diary ==
In 2019, Lloyd's family donated her war-era diary to the Malvern Museum. Each page was also photographed and posted to a Blipfoto journal from 31 August 2019 to 11 January 2021, corresponding with the same days they were written by Lloyd 80 years earlier.

In 2022, Lloyd and her diary were the subject of an exhibition at the museum and an eight episode podcast series produced by staff and students at the Edinburgh Napier University. The podcast, Diary of the War, was supplemented by news reports from that time. Bonus episodes included Lloyd's poems. A volume of Lloyd's poetry was also published. The work was funded by the Arts and Humanities Research Council. In 2022, the podcast series received a commendation by the judges of the British Records Association's Janette Harley Award. In the same year, the series was added to the University of Oxford's Their Finest Hour archive.

Following the release of the podcast series of the Diary of the War, Edinburgh Napier University conducted research into audience engagement with the publication of Lloyd's diary and the podcast series, publishing their findings in the Archives journal.

== Works ==
- Lloyd, Lorna B. Diary of the War (2019-2021)
- Ryan, B. & Hall, H. (Eds.), (2022). Selected poems by Lorna Lloyd. Edinburgh: Edinburgh Napier University. ISBN 978-1-3999-2417-7.
