= Mary Gray =

Mary Gray may refer to:

- Bessy Bell and Mary Gray, ballad subjects
- Mary Augusta Dix Gray (1810–1881), American missionary to Nez Perce people in the Oregon Territory
- Mary Gray (socialist) (1854–1941), British socialist activist and founder of the first Socialist Sunday School
- Mary Caroline Gray (1819–1893), British author
- Mary L. Gray, American anthropologist and author
- Mary Tenney Gray (1833–1904), American editorial writer, philanthropist, and suffragette
- Mary Sophia Gray, alternate name of Sophia Hinerangi (c. 1834–1911), New Zealand tourist guide and temperance leader
- Mary W. Gray (born 1938), American mathematician
- Mary H. Gray Clarke (1835–1892), née Gray, American author, correspondent, and poet

== Fictional characters ==
- Mary Gray, in the 1926 American silent comedy film The American Venus

== See also ==
- Mary Gray-Reeves (born 1962), bishop
- Mary Grey (disambiguation)
