= Betty Johnston =

British educational administrator and parliamentary counsel

- Born: Betty Joan Harris; 18 May 1916; Morriston, England
- Died: 28 November 1994 (aged 78); Chelsea, London, England
- Occupation: Lawyer
- Spouse: Sir Alexander Johnston
- Children: 2

Betty Joan Johnston, Lady Johnston, CBE (née Harris; 18 May 1916 – 28 November 1994) was a British educational administrator and parliamentary counsel. She led a number of organisations - notably the Girls' Public Day School Trust.

== Life ==
Johnston was born in Morriston in 1916. Her parents were Catherine Anne (born Williams) and Edward Harris. Her father was a solicitor, and his wife, Catherine Anne Williams. She attended the private school of Cheltenham Ladies' College before proceeding to St Hugh's College, Oxford. In 1937, she was awarded a first class degree in jurisprudence and in 1938 a second class in Civil Law. She worked in the Treasury after she was called to the bar in 1940. She was promoted to assistant parliamentary counsel in 1942 and served until 1952. In 1955, she began working with the Girls' Public Day School Trust. The trust had been devised in the nineteenth century by Maria Georgina Grey to build schools to allow middle-class girls to obtain a secondary education and later to go to university. In the twentieth century it could provide a grant so that talented girls could go to one of their schools even though their family could not afford the bills.

She served on various committees rising in 1972 to lead the finance committee and three years later in 1975 she was the chair of its council and she became one of the governments parliamentary counsels. She and the trust had to reconsider when the government closed down the direct grants system. Stop gap means had to be created as it was not until 1979 that an Assisted Places Scheme could be devised which was again funded by the government. She retired as a parliamentary counsel in 1983 and then spent five years volunteering a similar service for the general synod of the Church of England. At the same time she became the chair of several organisations. She led the governors of the Girls' School Association from 1979 to 1989 and the Independent Schools' Joint Council from 1983 to 1986. She was still chair until 1991 of the Girls' Public Day School Trust and then she was promoted to president for three years. In 1989 she was appointed a CBE.

Johnston died in Chelsea in 1994.

== Private life ==
She married Sir Alexander Johnston GCB KBE in 1947 and they had two children.
