= Joseph Thacker =

Anglican priest

Joseph Thacker was an Anglican priest in the nineteenth century, and was the Archdeacon of Ossory from 1860 until his death in 1883.

A graduate of Trinity College, Dublin, he held incumbencies in Kilfane and Thomastown.

In July 1863 outbuildings at his residence of Kilfane Glebe were burned. According to the Dublin Evening Mail, the subsequent inquiry heard that: "Certain parties thought the Archdeacon was too zealous in his profession as a clergyman, in opposing the tenets of the Church of Rome and in promoting the growth of Protestantism, and the location of Protestant labourers in the parish; and that no other motive could be assigned for the outrage."

In April 1869, he was criticised for telling a meeting of Kilkenny Protestants to "trust in God and keep your powder dry," a maxim attributed to Oliver Cromwell.

Thacker was born in 1807 and died on 25 April 1883. His father, Joseph Thacker, of Ballymeelish, Borris-in-Ossory, was from a Quaker family, but left the Society of Friends to marry a Church of Ireland cousin. Joseph Gurney and his sister Elizabeth Fry, the Quaker social reformers, stayed with the archdeacon's parents on their visit to Ireland in 1827. He married Charlotte Louisa, the daughter of John Smyly KC, of Dublin, and niece of Sir Philip Crampton, the eminent surgeon.
