= Maria Grey (novelist) =

- Died: 4 August 1857; Richmond
- Occupation: Novelist
- Spouse(s): William Grey
- Parent(s): William Shirreff
- Relatives: William Henry Shirreff

Maria Grey (1782 – 4 August 1857) was a British novelist who published under the name Hon. Mrs. Grey.

Maria Grey was born in 1782, the daughter of General William Shirreff and Margaret Baynard. Her brother was Admiral William Henry Shirreff. In 1805, she married Lt. Col. William Grey, brother of Prime Minister Charles Grey. Their son William Thomas Grey married his first cousin, author Maria Georgina Shirreff, daughter of Admiral Shirreff.

Grey published three novels. Due to the similarity in names and the British custom of publishing women's novels under only their last name, her works are often confused or conflated with those by her niece and daughter-in-law Maria Georgina Shirreff Grey, Catherine Maria Grey (1798–1870), Anna Maria Grey (1823–1888), and Elizabeth Caroline Grey.

Maria Grey died on 4 August 1857 at Richmond.

== Bibliography ==
- De Lisle: or, The Distrustful Man. 3 vol. London: Edward Bull, 1828.
- The Trials of Life. 3 vol. London: Edward Bull, 1829.
- The Way of the World. 3 vol. London: Edward Bull, 1831.
