= British Dominions Women's Suffrage Union =

International women's organization (1913–1922)

The British Dominions Women's Suffrage Union (BDWSU) was a women's organization, founded in 1913 and dissolved in 1922.

== Foundation ==
The Union was founded in New Zealand in February 1913 by Margaret Hodge and Harriet Newcomb. It organized the suffrage organisations of the British colonies and aimed to foster women's equality throughout the British Empire and facilitate communication between dominion and metropolitan organisations. Among its members were New Zealand, Australia, South Africa and Canada.

The Union held international conferences in London in 1916 and 1918. A deputation was organised to the British Home Secretary in December 1916.

== Members ==
Members included British suffragist Dorothy Pethick, who served as honorary secretary in 1916 and South African suffragist Daisy Dorothea Solomon who worked as literature secretary. It was also supported by British suffragists Millicent Fawcett, Sylvia Pankhurst and Emmeline Pethick-Lawrence.

== Dissolved ==
The Union changed its name to British Dominions Women Citizens' Union in 1918. In 1922, it was dissolved in to the British Overseas Committee of the International Woman Suffrage Alliance.
