= Shirreffs =

Shirreffs is a surname, and may refer to:

- Gordon D. Shirreffs (1914–1996), American writer of western and juvenile novels
- John Shirreffs (1945–2026), American racehorse trainer
- Steve Shirreffs (born 1976), American ice hockey player
- William Shirreffs (1846–1902), Scottish sculptor

== See also ==
- Shirreff (disambiguation)
