= Mary Grey =

Mary Grey may refer to:

- Mary Caroline Grey, birth name of Mary Elliot-Murray-Kynynmound, Countess of Minto (1858–1940), British aristocrat
- Mary Grey (theologian) (born 1941), English Roman Catholic ecofeminist liberation theologian
- Lady Mary Grey (1545–1578), sister of Jane Grey, Queen of England
- Mary Grey, Countess Grey (1776–1861), wife of Charles Grey, 2nd Earl Grey
- Mary Grey, Countess of Kent (died 1702), English peeress
- Mary Grey, Baroness Grey de Wilton
- Lady Mary Gregory (1719–1769), née Lady Mary Grey, daughter of Henry Grey, 1st Duke of Kent

== Fictional characters ==
- Mary Grey, in the 1939 American comedy film Fifth Avenue Girl

== See also ==
- Mary Gray (disambiguation)
- Mary Gray-Reeves (born 1962), American Episcopal bishop
