= Catherine Maria Grey =

British novelist

- Born: January 1, 1798; Kolkata
- Died: February 19, 1870 (aged 72); Cheltenham
- Occupation: Novelist
- Children: Anna Grey, Mary Caroline Gray

Catherine Maria Grey (January 1, 1798 – February 19, 1870) was a British novelist, best known for The Gambler's Wife (1844).

She was born Catherine Maria Grindall on January 1, 1798 in Calcutta, the daughter of Benjamin Grindall of the Bengal Civil Service and his wife Charlotte Powney Grindall. In 1817 she married Lieutenant-Colonel John Grey of the 2nd Dragoons (Royal Scots Greys) and they had seven children, including novelists Anna Maria Grey and Mary Caroline Gray.

Catherine Grey published 21 silver fork novels. Sarah Josepha Hale wrote that Grey was "Triton among the minnows" who was "at the head of that class of novel-writers who administer to the amusement of those who read merely for something to do." Grey's most popular work was The Gambler's Wife, about the downfall of Maud Sutherland after she elopes with charming gambler Harry Percy. Irish poet Katharine Tynan remembered that "when only four years old she sobbed herself to sleep after hearing The Gambler's Wife read aloud."

Due to the similarity in names and the British custom of publishing women's novels under only their last name, her works are often confused or conflated with those by her daughter Anna Maria Grey, Maria Grey, Maria Georgina Shirreff Grey, and Elizabeth Caroline Grey.

Catherine Maria Grey died on February 19, 1870 in Cheltenham.

== Bibliography ==
- Alice Seymour: A Tale. 1 vol. London: Hatchard, 1831.
- Hyacinthe: or, The Contrast. 1 vol. London: James Cochrane, 1835.
- The Duke: A Novel. 3 vol. London: Bentley, 1839.
- The Young Prima Donna: A Romance of the Opera. 3 vol. London: Bentley, 1840.
- The Little Wife; and The Baronet's Daughters. 3 vol. London: Saunders and Otley, 1841.
- The Belle of the Family: or, The Jointure: A Novel. 3 vol. London: T. C. Newby, 1843.
- The Gambler's Wife: A Novel. 3 vol. London: T. C. Newby, 1844.
- The Old Dower House: A Tale of Bygone Days. 3 vol. London: T. C. Newby, 1844.
- The Bosom Friend: A Novel. 3 vol. London: T. C. Newby, 1845.
- Sybil Lennard: A Novel. 3 vol. London: T. C. Newby, 1846.
- Daughters: A Novel. 3 vol. London: T. C. Newby, 1847.
- Aline: An Old Friend's Story. 3 vol. London: T. C. Newby, 1848.
- The Rectory Guest: A Novel. 3 vol. London: T. C. Newby, 1849.
- An Old Country House. 3 vol. London: T. C. Newby, 1850.
- Mary Seaham: A Novel. 3 vol. London: Henry Colburn, 1852.
- The Young Husband. 3 vol. London: Hurst and Blackett, 1854.
- Cousin Harry. 3 vol. London: Hurst and Blackett, 1858.
- The Little Beauty. 3 vol. London: Hurst and Blackett, 1860.
- Passages in the Life of a Fast Young Lady. 3 vol. London: Hurst and Blackett, 1862.
- Good Society: or, Contrasts of Character. 3 vol. London: Hurst and Blackett, 1863.
- Lion-Hearted: A Novel. 2 vol. London: Sampson Low, 1864.
