= Blipfoto =

Photo journaling and social media website

Blipfoto Ltd.
- Company type: Private
- Website type: Social networking service
- Founded: Edinburgh, Scotland (2004)
- Headquarters: Edinburgh, Scotland
- Area served: Worldwide
- Founders: Joe Tree; Graham Maclachlan
- Industry: Internet
- Website: www.blipfoto.com

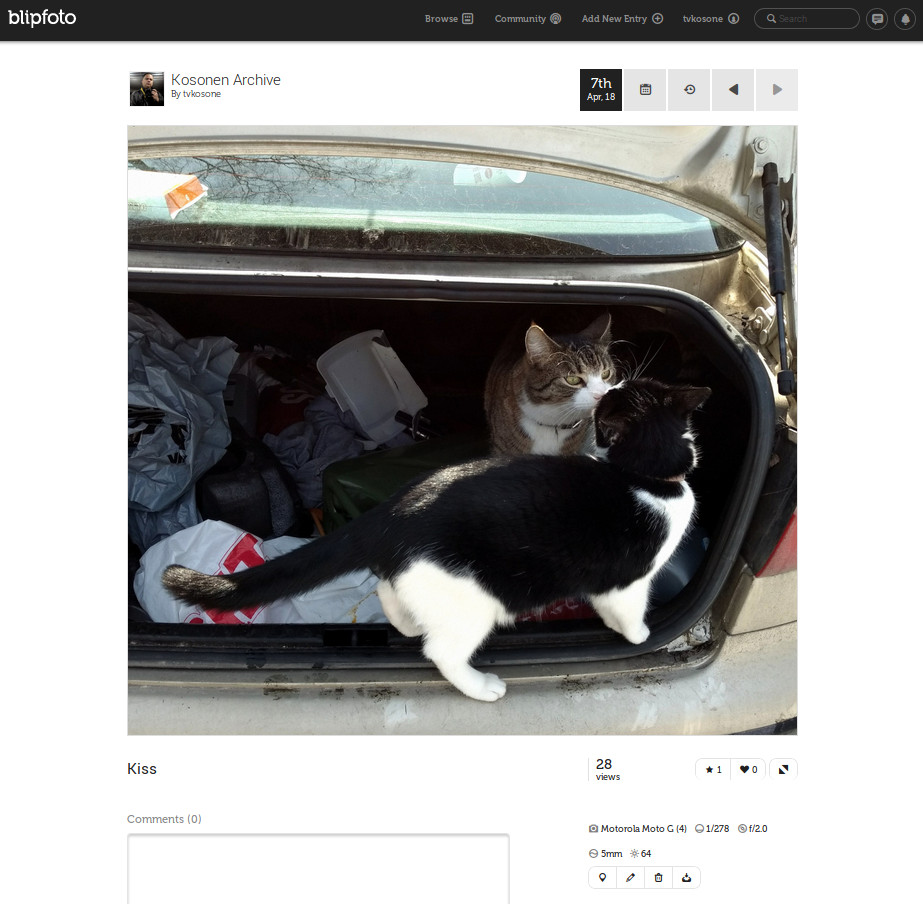
Screenshot from Blipfoto on April 7, 2018

Blipfoto is an Edinburgh-headquartered online daily photo journal and social networking service allowing people to save a record of their life in pictures; sharing their photographs and telling their stories one day at a time. It has a positive ‘Be Excellent’ ethos.

With over 18 million page views a month, the site has a strict rule allowing its users to post just one picture a day to their journal. To date, 'Blippers' in over 170 countries worldwide have posted 3.4 million photos with close to 22 million shared comments on the site. Each photo on Blipfoto represents a single day in someone's life - so there are almost 3.5m individual days saved to date.

== History ==
In October 2004, Blipfoto founder Joe Tree built a website which let him publish just one photo a day on the internet and write something about it. He set two simple rules: he could only upload one picture a day, and it had to be taken on that day. (Note: "A million photos which changed my life, one day at a time", Blipfoto, 20 May 2011. Retrieved 1 May 2012.)

In the summer of 2006, Tree released a rudimentary version of Blipfoto and invited 15 other people to join in. It let anyone set up a journal of their own, upload one picture a day, write some words, and comment on other people’s material. This was subsequently opened to anyone.

In November 2009, the site won a BAFTA Scotland award for the best website.

Following the BAFTA win, in December 2010 Blipfoto announced seed investment which allowed the business to turn from a project into a full-time venture.

In 2011, it was voted as best Scottish website by arts and culture magazine The List.

Blipfoto also worked in partnership with a number of large organisations on photographic projects and competitions. It premiered a film – life.turns - at the Edinburgh Art Festival in 2010. The stop motion film was created using 1205 photographs taken in 21 countries over 40 days. (Note: "life.turns.premiere", Blipfoto, 26 August 2010. Retrieved 1 May 2012.)

This was the inspiration for Scotland The World Over, a collaboration with Scotland.org. The film centred on the Scottish saltire flag, showing people in 32 countries around the world holding it. The film was compiled between St. Andrew's Day 2011 and Burns Night 2012.

In January 2015, Blipfoto went into partnership with Polaroid and the website was rebranded and relaunched as Polaroid Blipfoto.

In March 2015, Polaroid Blipfoto went into liquidation. Business services firm FRP Advisory were appointed as liquidators of the Edinburgh-based firm on 11 March.

In February 2016, a new community owned company, Blipfuture CIC, completed purchase of the blipfoto website after raising over £130,000 in a crowdfunding campaign, allowing Blipfuture CIC to run the website for the benefit of its community, supported by volunteers.

== Notable users ==
- Mike Russell MSP (Note: "Feorlean on Blipfoto", Blipfoto, 2 November 2009. Retrieved 30 August 2012.)
- Steve Wozniak (Note: "stevewoz on Blipfoto", Blipfoto, 23 August 2012. Retrieved 26 September 2012.)
- Roseanna Cunningham MSP (Note: "Roseannasnp on Blipfoto", Blipfoto, 10 November 2012. Retrieved 13 November 2012.)
- Peter May (Note: "PeterMay on Blipfoto", Blipfoto, 17 January 2013. Retrieved 21 January 2013.)
- Janice Hally (Note: "janicehally on Blipfoto", Blipfoto, 21 January 2013. Retrieved 21 January 2013.)
- Corrie Corfield (Note: "Corrie52 on Blipfoto", Blipfoto, 1 February 2013. Retrieved 18 February 2013.)
