= Kensington Preparatory School =

Location
- 596 Fulham Road; London, SW6 5PA; England; 51.47724°N 0.2023°W

Information
- Type: Preparatory day school
- Established: 1873 (predecessor school)
- Founder: Girls' Day School Trust
- Local authority: Hammersmith and Fulham
- Department for Education URN: 100509 Tables
- Head: Caroline Hulme-McKibbin
- Gender: Girls
- Age: 4 to 11
- Enrolment: 295~
- Colours: Red, Blue
- Website: www.kensingtonprep.gdst.net

Kensington Preparatory School is a private day school for girls aged 4–11 in Fulham, London, England. Despite its name, the school is not located in Kensington although it was founded there. It moved from Kensington to Fulham in 1997. Entry at all levels is by assessment.

== History ==
Kensington Prep School traces its history to Chelsea High School, the first school founded by the Girls' Public Day School Company (now the Girls' Day School Trust). It opened in January 1873 at Smith Street in Chelsea with 20 girls under headmistress Miss Porter. In 1879 it moved to Cromwell Road in Kensington and was accordingly renamed Kensington High School. The original Chelsea High School continued functioning until 1894. In 1888 Kensington High moved once more to Lytham House, also in Kensington, but the building was destroyed by a bomb in 1941. The school was relocated to Phillimore Gardens as a temporary measure for the duration of World War II while the management searched for a better location. In the end, the senior school was closed several years after the War ended while the junior school remained open and became Kensington Prep.

== Former pupils ==
Kensington Preparatory School

- Madalyn Aslan, author
- Lady Davina Lewis, daughter of Prince Richard, Duke of Gloucester

Kensington High School

- Emily Davison, suffragette
- Clarissa Eden, spouse of the late former Prime Minister of the United Kingdom Anthony Eden
- Eleanor Rathbone, MP and women's rights campaigner
- Martha Annie Whiteley, chemist and mathematician
