= Kate Hall (curator) =

British museum curator

Kate Marion Hall FLS FZS (August 1861 – 12 April 1918) was an English museum curator, educator and writer. As the curator of the Whitechapel Museum, Hall was the first professionally employed female curator in England.

== Biography ==
Hall was born during August 1861 in Newmarket, Suffolk. Her parents were the artist Harry Hall, most known for his drawings of animals, and his wife Ellen Hall (née Payne).

Hall was raised in the countryside then was educated at Highfield School in Hendon, where she was taught by Fanny Metcalfe. She then studied at University College London from 1881, but did not graduate with a degree, as she "never succeeded in mastering Latin."

From 1891, Hall provided botany lectures at Toynbee Hall, which provided free education programmes in the East End of London, as well as giving lectures and demonstrations to local school children as part of the Natural History Society. In 1905, Hall was one of the speakers in the Horniman Museum's series of public lectures, speaking on "The life of the honey bee", "The work of the honey bee", and "Trees". At this time, the Horniman Museum was the only museum in England that invited women to give lectures.

As the curator of the Whitechapel Museum from 1894 to 1909, Hall became the first professionally employed female curator in England. She succeeded her mentor, the botanist and geologist, Alfred Vaughan Jennings. Hall also founded the Nature Study Museum in a disused chapel of St George in the East church, in London, in 1904. It received up to a thousand visitors a day during summer, held the "first municipal beehive," and aimed to educate local children about the natural world.

In 1901, Hall presented a paper "The Smallest Museum" at the Edinburgh Conference of the Museums Association. She was appointed a Fellow of the Linnean Society of London in 1905.

Towards the end of her museum career, Hall published two books titled Nature Rambles in London in 1908 and "Common British Animals" in 1913.

Hall died on 12 April 1918 at New Place, Lingfield, Surrey.
