= Maria Grey Training College =

UK teacher training college (1878–1976)

Coordinates: 51°31′18″N 0°8′18″W

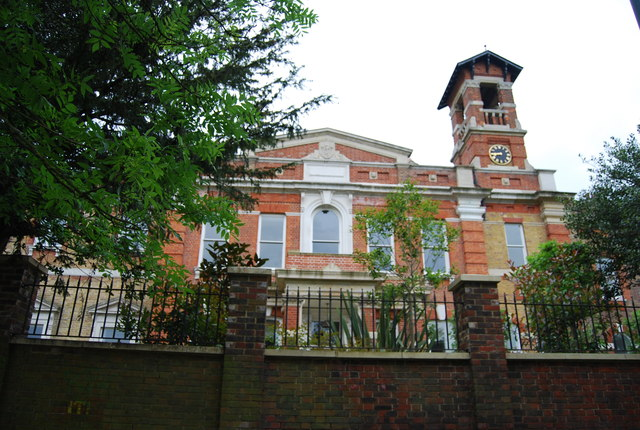
The listed building near Twickenham and Isleworth where the college was from 1946

Maria Grey Training College was a training college in London, England, for teachers from 1878 to 1976. When it opened, it was the first teacher training college for women in Great Britain. It was named for Maria Georgina Grey, a promoter of women's education and a founder of the organisation that became the Girls' Day School Trust.

== History ==
The college was opened as the Teachers' Training & Registration Society College on 1 May 1878 in the Clergy House, Skinner Street, Bishopsgate (now Pindar Street). In some literature it is recorded as the first teacher training college for women, however Whitelands College (now part of the University of Roehampton) opened in 1841 as a women's teacher training college and was the first such college in England for women. The Teachers' Training & Registration Society was created by the Women's Education Union to promote women's right to education and the professional recognition of female teachers. The Society was promoted by Maria Georgina Grey, who had also been fundamental in the founding of the Union.

In 1885, it moved to Fitzroy Square, and in March 1886 it was renamed Maria Grey College after its founder. The college was attached to Brondesbury and Kilburn High School so that the trainee teachers could test their skills in a classroom situation. New buildings for the college and high school were erected in 1892, designed by architect J. Osborne Smith, at a cost of £11,500 (£1.26 million as of 2025).

In 1892, it attracted Alice Woods as its new head. She was not a great administrator but she focussed on raising the quality of the student's work. Under her leadership, she was able to have lecturers who were all graduates for every area except for the kindergarten. The teachers learnt about teaching methods developed by Maria Montessori and Froebel.

In 1946, it moved to Twickenham. In 1976, the college merged with Borough Road College and Acton & Chiswick Polytechnic to form the West London Institute of Higher Education. In 1995, the West London Institute of Higher Education became part of Brunel University. The site was sold when the department moved to Uxbridge in 2005.

== Primary sources ==
The records of the college are now held in the Brunel University Archives.

== Notable alumni ==
- Margaret Emily Hodge
- Charlotte Laurie
- Madiha Omar
- Clotilde von Wyss
- Mary Russell Walker was trained here before creating a similar college in Scotland

== See also ==
- Maria Georgina Grey
