= Mary Caroline Gray =

British author and novelist (1819–1893)

- Born: 1819; Weymouth
- Died: 1893 (aged 73–74)
- Occupation: Novelist
- Parent(s): Catherine Maria Grey
- Relatives: Anna Grey

Mary Caroline Grey Gray (1819 – 1893) was a British author and novelist who published under the name Mrs. Russell Gray.

Mary Caroline Grey was born on 1819 in Weymouth, the eldest of five daughters of Lt.-Col. John Grey and the popular novelist Catherine Maria Grey. In 1841, she married Russell Gray and they had three children. She published a volume of popular history, Early Days of English Princes (1846), and a number of books and stories for children. She published one novel, Lisette's Venture (1874).

== Bibliography ==
- Early Days of English Princes. London, 1846
- My Longest Walk. London, 1860.
- Lottie’s Half Sovereign, and other Stories, London, 1863
- Lion-Hearted, London, 1864,
- Lisette's Venture. 2 vol. London: Henry S. King, 1874.
- The Sea-side Home. 1 vol. London: Groombridge, 1874.
