= Joseph Gurney =

British biblical scholar

Joseph Gurney (15 October 1804 – 12 August 1879), was a British shorthand writer and biblical scholar, notable for his publications and work with the Religious Tract Society.

== Life ==
Gurney was the eldest son of shorthand writer William Brodie Gurney, and he was born in London on 15 October 1804. His grandfather and great grandfather had also been shorthand writers.

He first attended an important committee of the House of Commons in 1822, and continued to take notes till 1872. On his father's resignation in 1849, he was appointed shorthand writer to the Houses of Parliament. Like his father, he was interested in religious and philanthropic movements. He was for more than fifty years a member of the committee of the Religious Tract Society, and latterly its treasurer. He was also treasurer of the Baptist college in Regent's Park.

On Gurney's retirement as shorthand writer to the houses of parliament in 1872, the post was given to his nephew William Henry Gurney Salter. Gurney died at Tyndale Lodge, Wimbledon Common, on 12 August 1879, and was interred at the Norwood Cemetery.

== Works ==
Gurney brought out popular commentaries on the Bible. The best known of these was The Annotated Paragraph Bible, containing the Old and New Testaments according to the authorised version, with explanatory Notes, Prefaces to the several Books, and an entirely new selection of references to parallel and illustrative Passages, two vols., London, 1850–60, published by the Religious Tract Society. It was successful, and widely praised. The notes were prepared under Gurney's supervision.

Besides other bibles, Gurney published also The Revised English Bible, London, 1877, closely resembling the Revised Version (1885). The profits of his literary works he gave to the Religious Tract Society.

== Family ==
Gurney married first Emma, daughter of E. Rawlings, and they had three children, William, Amelia and the educationalist Mary Gurney. Emma died and he had more children with his second wife Harriet Tritton of Lombard Street.

== Notes ==
- This article incorporates text from a publication now in the public domain: "Gurney, Joseph (1804-1879)". Dictionary of National Biography. London: Smith, Elder & Co. 1885–1900.
