= Girls' Day School Trust =

British charitable organisation

- Abbreviation: GDST
- Formation: 1872
- Type: Non-governmental organisation
- Purpose: Educational accreditation
- Headquarters: London, SW1
- Region served: England and Wales
- Chief Executive: Cheryl Giovannoni
- Patron: The Duchess of Gloucester
- Website: www.gdst.net

The Girls' Day School Trust (GDST) is a group of 24 independent schools and two academies in England and Wales, catering for girls aged 3 to 18. It is the largest group of private schools in the UK, and educates over 20,000 girls each year. It was formed in 1872 to provide affordable day-school (non-boarding) education for girls as The Girls' Public Day School Company (1872–1905), then The Girls' Public Day School Trust (1906–1998).

The GDST is a registered charity. In 2016–17 it had a gross income of £261 million, making it one of the 20 largest charities in the UK.

== History ==
=== Origins ===
The origins of the GDST can be traced back to the Schools Enquiry Commission set up in 1864 to survey the field of male and female secondary schools, which concluded that there was a "general deficiency" in the provision of secondary education for girls.

The challenge to provide education for girls aged over ten was tackled by Maria Grey and her sister Emily Shirreff, who had previously published Thoughts on Self Culture, which pointed out the shortage of education for women in England. In November 1871 the sisters launched the "National Union for improvement of the Education of Women of All Classes", later the Women's Education Union. The Union aimed to establish good and cheap day schools for all classes of girls above the level of elementary education and was the leading force behind the formation of the Teachers' Training and Registration Society and the Girls' Public Day School Company. The Union was supported by many major figures of the time, notably Henrietta Stanley, Baroness Stanley of Alderley, Mary Gurney, and Princess Louise, Duchess of Argyll, who became the President of the Union.

=== Foundation ===
The Union planned to create a limited liability company to raise revenue to achieve their aims and presented the proposed scheme at a public meeting at the Royal Albert Hall in June 1872. The new company was registered as the Girls' Public Day School Company (GPDSC) with a nominal share capital of £12,000. Many of the figures involved in the Women's Education Union also were key figures in the creation the GPDSC including Maria Grey, Emily Shirreff, Mary Gurney and Lady Stanley. HRH Princess Louise became the patron of the GPDSC. Members of the founding council included David Graham Drummond Ogilvy, 10th Earl of Airlie, GPDSC's first president; Henrietta Powell; Sir George Bartley; Douglas Strutt Galton; Sir Walter James, second baronet; Joseph Payne; James Phillips Kay-Shuttleworth; Charles Savile Roundell; and the Marquess of Lorne.

=== Girls' Public Day School Company (1872–1905) ===
The GPDSC's aim was to establish academic high schools for girls of all classes which provided a high standard of academic education, together with moral and religious education. School fees were kept low and schools were expected to become self-supporting as soon as possible, though the GPDSC council retained overall control of the schools. The policy of the Council, the executive body of the GPDSC, was to only found new schools where they were most needed, funded by shares taken up by local people. The first school opened at Durham House, Chelsea in January 1873 (later transferred to Kensington and is now Kensington Preparatory School). In February 1875 the GPDSC opened Norwich High School for Girls, its first school outside London. By 1905 the GPDSC owned 37 school across the country, including 19 schools in the London area.

Each school was to have three departments, (preparatory, Junior and senior), under a headmistress with a staff of trained teachers. Schools were to be tested by regular inspections and examinations. Girls were prepared to take Oxford and Cambridge Local Examinations or examinations administered by the College of Preceptors. A class of student pupil teachers was attached to each school.

Initially the schools provided in-house training for pupils who intended to go on to teaching after graduation through the 'Pupil teachers' system. From 1903 some of the larger schools also developed teacher training departments, recognised by the Board of Education, where post-graduate students training to become secondary, kindergarten, or art teachers. The largest was housed at Belvedere School in Liverpool. Clapham Training College, founded in 1900, also had a domestic science department. In 1938 it moved and became the Clapham and Streatham Hill Training College, transferring to the London County Council in 1949 to become the Phillipa Fawcett Teacher Training College.

From 1875–1901 the GPDSC amended its constitution so it could be recognised as a charity to receive grants from the Science and Art Department (and the Board of Education from 1899), who only wanted to give public grants to non-profit organisations. Due to the financial needs of the trust there were many years in which the dividends were not paid to shareholders. By 1900 the GPDSC educated over 7000 pupils in 33 schools. In 1899 the new Board of Education became responsible for issuing government grants under much stricter regulations and the GPDSC agreed for their schools to be inspected by school inspectors to continue to qualify for grants.

=== Girls' Public Day School Trust Limited (1905–1950) ===
The Education Act 1902 determined that secondary education should be accessible to as many children as possible which had financial complications for the GPDSC as it had to provide more free places and cater for increasing numbers of pupils. In 1902 the GPDSC was warned that it would not longer receive grants from the Board of Education after 1903 because it was a dividend-paying company. This date was later extended to 1905 and the GPDSC was reconstituted as the Girls' Public Day School Trust Limited (GPDST), a limited company with charitable status, in Jan 1906. The new constitution required that the GPDST would have to be wound up by 1 January 1956 if it failed to make an acceptable offer to buy the GPDSC's share capital.

To prevent the closure of the GPDST 100 new shares were created in 1911, held as trustee shares of nominal value, which carried large voting rights to enable the GPDST's Council to buy the existing share capital before 1956.

From 1912 no dividends were paid to shareholders and, along with the financial burdens caused by World War I and the proceeding economic depression (see Great Depression), some shareholders became restive due to the lack of dividends. World War II plunged the GPDST into more financial trouble and the Education Act 1944 presented them with new challenges as they had to extend the schools to cater for increasing numbers of pupils. The GPDST was increasingly unable to purchase the remaining share capital from the shareholders and was quickly approaching the 1956 deadline.

In 1944 the GPDST joined the Government's new Direct Grant Scheme to help keep the school fees low during the financial difficulties. This scheme used grants to support independent academically selective schools outside the non-selective public education system of the time. The scheme insisted that a third of the members of the Governing Bodies had to be representatives of the local education authority and 25% of pupils admitted had to come directly from elementary schools.

After the war the GPDST relied on funding from the Ministry of Education and any profits received from school fees were used to refurbish the schools. The Council worked on a reconstruction scheme which would satisfy the shareholders and for the trust to be recognised as an educational charity before the 1956 deadline. The scheme, led by William Cash, was presented in March 1950 and confirmed in May 1950, saving the GPDST from liquidation. 'Limited' was dropped from the name of the Trust and it became The Girls' Public Day School Trust. The GPDST still had to make the repayments of £75,000 to shareholders and extended its mortgages and set up an endowment fund to pay off the debt.

=== Girls' Public Day School Trust (1950–1998) ===
After the debts were repaid the GPDST set up The Friends of the Girls' Public Day School Trust in March 1951. The Friends published an annual newsletter and also awarded scholarships and gift to schools. The Friends also created schemes to raise money to refurbish the schools.

The direct grant scheme was abolished in 1976 when Betty Johnston was chair of the council. The GPDST schools had to convert to full independence to remain academically selective. In the same year the GPDST instituted the Girls' Public Day Trust Bursaries Fund, a separate charity, to cater for the loss of the Government funding. The fund provided bursaries for girls who otherwise could not afford to go to the schools.

Lady Johnston took the lead in getting the GPDST to apply for the Government's Assisted Places Scheme for all schools and registered as a private company under the Companies Act 1980. The GPDST was a part of the scheme until the scheme's closure in 1997.

=== Girls' Day School Trust (since 1998) ===
In 1998 the organisation became the Girls' Day School Trust (GDST).

In 2005 some GDST schools began to be co-educational, such as Howell's School, Llandaff, which taught sixth-form boys. Hilden Grange, a co-educational preparatory school, joined the GDST in 2005. In 2007 the GDST administered 29 day schools, offering education from the ages of three to 18.

The GDST was at the forefront of the independent-led arm of the Labour Government's Academy programme and converted two schools into the maintained sector, with The Belvedere School, Liverpool, in September 2007 and Birkenhead High School in September 2009. These schools lose their right to select pupils on the basis of academic ability, but retain some independence from the Government with the GDST maintaining a majority on the governing body.

In December 2021, the GDST issued a blanket ban on trans girls being admitted to any of its schools.

In early 2022 the GDST decided to withdraw staff from the Teachers' Pension Scheme, following an increase in fees from 16.48% to 23.8% of salary following a HM Treasury evaluation of public sector pensions. In Feb 2022, 1600 members of the National Education Union took strike action over proposals to withdraw from the Teachers' Pension Scheme. The dispute was the first national strike in the GDST's 149 year history and is the first time teachers have taken strike action at an independent school chain.

== Current GDST schools ==
Schools run by the GDST as of July 2018 include:

=== Preparatory schools ===
- Kensington Preparatory School (Opened 1873)
- The Study Prep School, Wimbledon (Opened 1907)

=== Schools for 3–18 year olds ===
- Birkenhead High School Academy (Opened 1901)
- Blackheath High School (Opened 1880)
- Brighton Girls (Opened 1876)
- Bromley High School (Opened 1883)
- Croydon High School (Opened 1874)
- Howell's School, Llandaff (Joined the GDST in 1980)
- Newcastle High School for Girls (Opened 1895)
- Northampton High School (Joined the GDST in 2006)
- Northwood College for Girls (Opened 1878. Joined the GDST in 2014)
- Norwich High School for Girls (Opened 1875)
- Nottingham High School for Girls (Opened 1875)
- Notting Hill & Ealing High School (Opened 1873)
- Oxford High School (Opened 1875)
- Portsmouth High School (Opened 1882)
- Putney High School (Opened 1893)
- Redmaids' High School (joined GDST 2024)
- Royal High School, Bath (Opened 1875)
- Sheffield High School (Opened 1878)
- Shrewsbury High School (Opened 1885)
- South Hampstead High School (Opened 1876)
- Streatham & Clapham High School (Opened 1887)
- Sutton High School (Opened 1884)
- Sydenham High School (Opened 1887)
- Wimbledon High School (Opened 1880)

=== School for 11–18 year olds ===
- The Belvedere Academy, Liverpool (Opened 1880 as Liverpool High School, later The Belvedere School)

== Former GDST schools ==
The following schools were once opened or administered by the GDST. The dates relate to when the school was connected to the Trust. Unless otherwise stated the later date signifies the date of the closure of each school.

- Bath High School, 1875. Merged with the Royal School for Daughters of Officers of the Army to form the Royal High School (member school)
- Carlisle High School, 1884–1904. Transferred to the Cumberland County Council. Later became St Aidan's County High School and Specialist Sports and Science College, now Richard Rose Central Academy.
- Charters-Ancaster School, 1988–1995. Merged with Battle Abbey School.
- Clapham Middle School, 1875–1904. Merged with Clapham High School.
- Clapham High School, 1882–1938. Merged with Streatham Hill and Brixton High School.
- Clapton and Hackney High School, 1875–1899. Originally Hackney High School.
- Dover High School, 1888–1908.
- Dulwich High School, 1878–1913. Transferred to Church Schools' Company. Closed in 1938.
- Gateshead High School, 1876–1907. Merged with Central Newcastle High School.
- Greycotes School, Oxford c1990s, Merged with the Squirrel School to form the preparatory department of Oxford High School.
- Heathfield School, Pinner Opened 1900. Joined the GDST in 1987. Merged with Northwood College in 2014.
- Highbury and Islington High School, 1878–1911.
- Hilden Grange School, 2005–2010. Ownership of the school was transferred to Alpha Plus Group from September 2010.
- Ipswich High School for Girls, 1878–2017. Purchased by the London & Oxford Group.
- Kensington High School, 1873–1948. Originally Chelsea High School. The junior school continues to function as Kensington Preparatory School.
- East Liverpool High School, 1891–1921. Merged with Liverpool High School.
- Newton Abbot High School, 1881–1888. School transferred to Miss Ridley.
- Paddington and Maida Vale High School, 1878–1912. Originally Maida Vale High School. Transferred to London County Council in 1912.
- The Squirrel School, Oxford, 1996–1997. Merged with Greycotes School to form preparatory department of Oxford High School.
- Swansea High School, 1888–1895.
- The Hamlets School, Liverpool, 1912–2010. Opened 1912 as junior section of The Belvedere School. Joined the GDST as a separate school in 2006. Sold in 2010
- Tunbridge Wells High School, 1883–1945.
- Weymouth High School, 1880–1894.
- York High School, 1880–1907. Transferred to Church Schools' Company and became York College for Girls (closed).

== Logo ==
From 2000 or earlier the trust used a logo showing the head of Minerva, Roman goddess of wisdom, in a green solid silhouette, with the name of the trust in large and small capital letters below it, separated by a horizontal line. By 2006 the head of Minerva was in green on a white circular background, with the name of the trust in mixed case on two lines beside it. For some time including 2014 the trust's logo was a filled red circle with the lower-case letters "gdst" in white, accompanied by the name of the trust in mixed case on two lines. This was replaced in January 2018 by the four letters "G D S T" widely spaced with the name of the trust in single-sized capital letters below.

== Patrons of the Girls' Day School Trust ==
- Princess Louise, Duchess of Argyll 1872–1939
- Princess Alice, Duchess of Gloucester
- Birgitte, Duchess of Gloucester

== Archives ==
Since 2006, the archives of the GDST are held by the Institute of Education, University College London. The collection spans 180 boxes and includes extensive administration records, details on curricula and exams, and publications relating to the GDST. The records of individual schools are held by the schools or in the relevant local authority archives.

== See also ==
- Kitty Anderson
- List of girls' schools in the United Kingdom
