= William Henry Shirreff =

British Royal Navy officer

Rear-Admiral William Henry Shirreff
- Born: 4 April 1785
- Died: 1 December 1847 (aged 62)
- Military career
- Allegiance: United Kingdom
- Branch: Royal Navy
- Service years: 1796–1847
- Rank: Rear-Admiral of the Blue
- Commands: HMS La Fama; HMS Lily; HMS Barrosa; HMS Andromache; HMS Warspite; Captain-Superintendent, Deptford; Captain-Superintendent, Chatham; Admiral-Superintendent, Portsmouth
- Conflicts: French Revolutionary Wars; Napoleonic Wars; West Indies campaign

William Henry Shirreff (baptised 4 April 1785 – 1 December 1847) was a British Royal Navy officer, captain of HMS Andromache, HMS Barrosa, HMS Warspite, and HMS Gibraltar. He had six children, four of whom were daughters. He had two notable daughters, Maria Georgina Grey and Emily Anne Eliza Shirreff, who transformed the education of British women. He retired as Rear-Admiral of the Blue.

== Biography ==
Shirreff was born in 1785 and joined the Royal Navy on 1 January 1796.

In 1810, he married Elizabeth Murray, the oldest daughter of the lawyer and Member of Parliament David Murray, a brother of Alexander Murray, 7th Lord Elibank.

From October 1812 until he invalided in July 1814, Shirreff commanded the frigate Barrosa on the coast of North America and in the West Indies.

From 10 September 1817 until September 1821 he commanded Andromache. While patrolling the west coast of South America in protection of British interests in the region and in support of local independence movement against Spanish authority in the early 19th century, he was advised by Captain William Smith about the discovery of the South Shetland Islands in March 1819. Later that year Shirreff chartered Smith's brig, the Williams, sending Lieutenant Edward Bransfield on board with the mission to survey and map the new lands.

From January to November 1830 he was the captain of Admiral Thomas Baker's flagship the 76 gun HMS Warspite. In 1831, he was appointed to Gibraltar. He and his family lived there until 1834. One of his sons had died in 1829 and the other died whilst they were in Gibraltar.

Shirreff was promoted in 1846 to Rear-Admiral of the Blue.

== Honour ==
Cape Shirreff at the north extremity of Ioannes Paulus II Peninsula on Livingston Island, in the South Shetland Islands is named after William Shirreff.

== Sources ==
- Alan Gurney, Below the Convergence: Voyages Toward Antarctica, 1699-1839, Penguin Books, New York, 1998
