= Norfolk News =

- Type: Weekly newspaper
- Founder: Richard Steele
- Founded: January, 1845
- Ceased publication: 1961

The Norfolk News was a regional weekly newspaper, published every Saturday, in Exchange Street, Norwich, England.

== History ==
The publication was founded in January, 1845, and ceased publication in 1961. The area it covered was the whole of Norfolk. Copies of the paper for most of its 116 years are held at the Local History Library in Norwich.

Notable editors of the paper include Edmund Rogers (1848–1870).
