= Emily Shirreff =

English writer, editor

- Born: 3 November 1814
- Died: 20 March 1897 (aged 82); London
- Education: Paris
- Occupation: educationist
- Parent(s): Rear-Admiral William Henry Shirreff (1785–1847) and Elizabeth Anne Shirreff

Emily Anne Eliza Shirreff (3 November 1814 – 20 March 1897) was a pioneer in the movement for the higher education of women and the development of the Froebelian principles in England.

== Biography ==
=== Family ===
She was born on 3 November 1814, the second of four daughters and two sons born to Rear-Admiral William Henry Shirreff (1785–1847) and Elizabeth Anne Shirreff. She was very close to her sister Maria Shirreff (later Grey), with whom she collaborated on educational and writing projects.

=== Education ===
Emily and her sisters were educated from an early age by a French governess called Adele Piqet, who had a limited education. In the 1820s the family lived in France where the father was stationed. Emily was a bright scholar at an early age but after suffering from a severe illness at the age of seven she had to relearn the alphabet. Emily suffered from ill health for the rest of her life.

At the age of 14 she was sent to a boarding school in Paris but the rough conditions at the school affected Emily's poor health and she was removed a year later. In 1829, her father took command of HMS Warspite and moved his family to Avranche in Lower Normandy. In 1831 her father was appointed to Gibraltar and did not think his daughters needed another governess, bringing their formal education to an end.

Maria and Emily continued to improve their education through 'self-improvement' by travelling extensively to France, Spain and Italy, reading in their father's extensive library, and became acquainted with many intellectuals of the age through their father's contacts.

=== Early writings ===
Emily and Maria first began to write together when Mrs Shirreff brought her daughters back to England in 1834. Their first publication, Letters from Spain and Barbary, was published in 1835. Though Maria was married in 1841, the two sisters continued to write together and anonymously published a romantic novel, Passion and Principle. In 1850, they published Thoughts on Self-Culture Addressed to Women, in which they disapproved of traditional girls' education which only trained women to be dependent on men and not teach them to think for themselves. In 1858, Shirreff published her first major solo work Intellectual Education and its Influence on the Character and Happiness of Women, which further highlighted Emily's belief that women should not be educated as 'man's subordinate'.

=== Educational work ===
In the 1870s, the sisters actively turned their attention to promoting education. Emily helped raise funds for the North London Collegiate School and continued to write papers on women's education. She was the second mistress of Girton College, Cambridge succeeding Charlotte Manning who served for only a term. Shirreff remained connected to the college until her death. Emily was one of the founders of the Froebel Society and was its president from 1876 until her death. She also wrote many articles and booklets on kindergarten education, and was the vice-president of the Parents' National Union. In 1879, under the pen name 'Member of the Aristocracy', she published a popular etiquette manual, Manners and Rules of Good Society, which she likely saw as a means of furthering her educational ideas.

In 1871, with her sister, Mary Gurney, Henrietta Stanley, Baroness Stanley of Alderley, and the support of HRH Princess Louise, Emily founded the National Union for the Improvement of the Education of Women of all Classes, (also known as the Women's Education Union). Emily was heavily involved in the work of the union as its honorary secretary and co-editor of its journal, the Journal of the Women’s Education Union. The Union also found the Girls' Public Day School Company in 1872, which opened secondary schools for girls which offered the same educational opportunities as boys' schools, and still operates today as the Girls' Day School Trust. She was very active on the Council of the company and was made a vice-president in 1896. Emily was also involved in the Union's foundation of an evening college for women and the teachers training and registration society.

=== Other interests ===
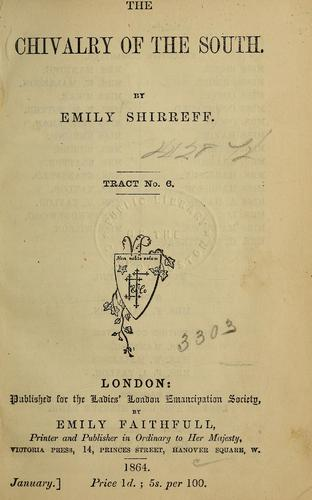
The Chivalry of the South published for the Ladies' London Emancipation Society

Emily was also interested in other areas of research and supported women's suffrage. Her opposition of the continuation of the use of slaves in southern US was aired in her 1864 paper, The Chivalry of the South. In 1874 she joined the Women's Peace and Arbitration Auxiliary, (later the London Peace Society). She also wrote a biographical sketch of Henry Thomas Buckle, who had been a close friend, for a posthumous edition of his works in 1872.

=== Later life ===
Emily had suffered from ill health all her life and became less active towards its end. She died in London on 20 March 1897 and was buried in Brompton cemetery.

== Publications ==
- Shirreff, Maria Georgina; Shirreff, Emily (1841), Passion and Principal. Edited by Captain Schmier. London.
- Grey, Maria Georgina; Shirreff, Emily (1850), Thoughts on Self-Culture Addressed to Women. London
- Shirreff, Emily (1858). Intellectual education and its influence on the character and happiness of women. John W Parker and Son. New editions 1862 and 1863.
- Shirreff, Emily (1863). "Our Modern Youth". Fraser's Magazine.
- Shirreff, Emily (1864). The Chivalry of the South. London: Emily Faithful for the Ladies' London Emancipation Society.
- Shirreff, Emily (1864). Kindergarten, Principles of Froebel's System and their bearing on the Education of Women. London: Emily Faithful for the Ladies' London Emancipation Society.
- Shirreff, Emily (1872). The work of the National Union. London: William Ridgeway.
- Shirreff, Emily (1870). "College Education for Women," The Contemporary Review.
- Shirreff, Emily (1872). Why should we learn?. London: John W Parker & Son.
- Shirreff, Emily (1875). The Enjoyment of Life, a lecture by E A E Shirreff delivered at the College of Men and Women, Mar 20, 1875. London: William Ridgeway.
- Shirreff, Emily (1877). The Claim of Froebel's System to be called "The New Education": a paper read at the meeting of the Froebel Society, London, June 5, 1877. New York: E Steiger.
- Shirreff, Emily (1877). The Kindergarten in Relations to Schools: papers read before the Society of Arts, December 12, 1877. Reading: W Millard.
- Shirreff, Emily (1879). Manners and Rules of Good Society. London: Frederick Warne & Co.
- Shirreff, Emily (1880). On Connection between the Kindergarten and the School: A lecture on Mme. Portugall's Synoptical Table. London: Sonnenschein &Allen.
- Shirreff, Emily (1880). 'Wasted Forces' Froebel Society's Tract No. 5. London: Sonnenschein & Allen.
- Shirreff, Emily (1884). Home Education in Relation to the Kindergarten: Two Lectures. London: J Hughes.
- Shirreff, Emily (1884). The Kindergarten at Home. London: J Hughes.
- Shirreff, Emily (1885). Kindergarten Teachers and Their Qualifications: Annual Address delivered before the Froebel Society. London: William Rice.
- Shirreff, Emily (1887). A short sketch of the Life of Frederick Froebel. London: Chapman & Hall.
- Shirreff, Emily (1892). Moral Training: Froebel and Herbert Spencer. London: Philip and Son.

== Published sources ==
- Kamm, Josephine (1971). Indicative Past: A Hundred Years of the Girl's Public Day School Trust. London: George Allen & Unwin.
- Ellsworth (1979). Liberators of the Female Mind: The Shirreff Sister, Educational Reform and the Women's Movement. Westport: Greenwood Press.
- The education papers: women's quest for equality in Britain, 1850-1912. London: Routledge & Kegan Paul. 1987.
- Levine, Philippa (October 2005). "Shirreff, Emily Anne Eliza (1814–1897)". Oxford Dictionary of National Biography. Oxford University Press. doi:10.1093/ref:odnb/25444. The first edition of this text is available at Wikisource: "Shirreff, Emily Anne Eliza" . Dictionary of National Biography. London: Smith, Elder & Co. 1885–1900.
- "Shirreff, Emily (Anne Eliza)". A historical dictionary of British women. Europa. 2003. pp. 392–393.

== See also ==
- Maria Georgina Grey
- Girls' Day School Trust

Academic offices
Preceded by Charlotte Manning	Mistress of Girton College, Cambridge; 1870	Succeeded by Annie Austin
