= Maria Georgina Grey =

British educationist and writer (1816-1906)

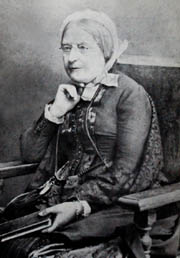
- Born: Maria Georgina Shirreff; 7 March 1816; Blackheath, London
- Died: 19 September 1906 (aged 90); Kensington, London
- Education: Paris
- Occupation: Educationist
- Spouse: William Grey (m. 1841-1864; his death)

Maria Georgina Grey (née Shirreff; 7 March 1816 – 19 September 1906), also known as Mrs William Grey, was a British educationist and writer who promoted women's education and was one of the founders of the organisation that became the Girls' Day School Trust. The college she founded was named in her honour the Maria Grey Training College.

== Biography ==
=== Family ===
Maria Georgina Shirreff was born on 7 March 1816 in Blackheath, London. She was the third daughter of Admiral William Henry and Elizabeth Anne Shirreff.

Out of her three sisters, Caroline (b. 1812), Emily (b. 1814), and Katherine (b. 1818), Maria was very close to her elder sister Emily Shirreff, who would later become her collaborator in her writings and campaigns. She also had two brothers who both died at an early age.

=== Educational experiences ===
In the 1820s the family lived in France where their father was stationed at St Germain en Laye, near Paris, and later in Normandy. The four Shirreff sisters were first taught at home by a French-Swiss governess who had a limited education.

In 1828, Maria and Emily joined a boarding school in Paris, which later influenced scenes in Maria's second novel Love’s Sacrifice in 1868. A year later they were removed from the school due to Emily's poor health and after their father was appointed captain of the port of Gibraltar in 1831 he did not think it was necessary to appoint another governess. Though their formal education was at an end, Maria and Emily continued to improve themselves by travelling extensively and became expert linguists through their visits to France, Spain and Italy, reading books from their father's extensive library, and became acquainted with many intellectuals of the age through their father's contacts.

In 1834, the sisters' mother brought her daughters back to England, and Maria and Emily began to write together. They first produced Letters from Spain and Barbary, published in 1835. In 1841 they wrote a novel called Passion and Principle, published anonymously.

In 1841, Maria married her cousin, William Thomas Grey, a wine merchant who was the son of author Maria Grey and nephew of former prime minister Earl Grey. The marriage was a happy one but produced no children.

=== Early writings ===
Even though she was married, Maria still remained close to Emily. She moved into William and Maria's home, and the sisters continued to write together. Their treatise on women's education, Thoughts on Self Culture Address to Women, was published in 1850 funded by Maria's husband.

In the publication they voiced their disapproval of the frivolous attitude to marriage and the established view that women should be only educated enough to attract a husband. They also laid out a basis for education for girls which included subjects, such as arithmetic, geometry, history, elementary science and politics, usually neglected in customary female education of the time. They also argued that female education should not end at 'the period when female education is supposed to be finished' and continue into later life.

=== Activities ===
Maria's husband died in 1864, and she began to take an active role in public life and joined Emily in the movement for the improving of education for girls. She was especially interested in the lack of funding for girls' education. In 1870 she wrote to the repeatedly to The Times to try to raise funds for the North London Collegiate School for Girls and encouraged Frances Buss to introduce student teachers.

In the same year, she also unsuccessfully stood for election as the representative for the Borough of Chelsea to The London School Board, one of the first women to do so. Her speeches were later published in a booklet entitled The London School Board. Maria saw the election as a turning point in her career leading her and Emily to work more toward the improvement of Women's Education.

Maria and Emily were also suffragists and in 1870 Maria published a booklet Is the Exercise of the Suffrage unfeminine?. Maria demanded the girls should receive an education which would prepare them for their increased civil responsibilities.

=== Women's Education Union ===
Maria proposed the creation of a national movement which would promote women's education and presented the scheme to the Society of Arts in 1871. The scheme received great support and Maria gave a second paper to the Social Science Association's annual congress in Leeds later the same year. As a result, Maria and Emily set up a provisional committee named the National Union of the Improving the Education of Women of All Classes (later shortened to the Women's Education Union).

The Union aimed 1871 to establish good and cheap day schools for all classes above the level of elementary education. Maria and Emily were very active in the Union, and Emily acted as the organizing secretary of the Union until 1879.

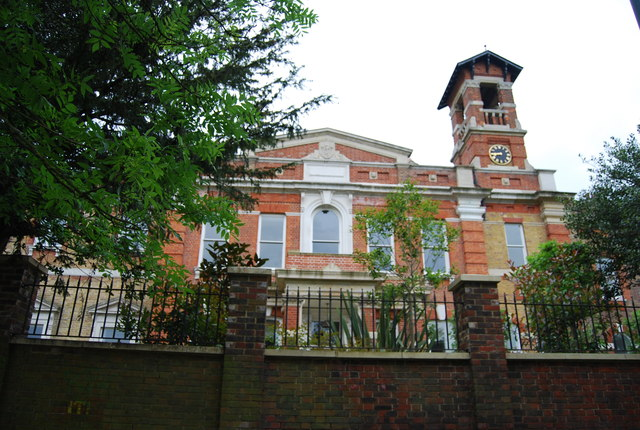
Maria Grey Training College (1946)

The Union also led to the formation The Girls' Public Day School Company (GPDSC) (now the Girls' Day School Trust) in 1872 to provide new secondary schools to educate girls from various classes. Maria was an active member of the Council of the GPDSC until 1890 when her poor health prevented her. In September 2007, this trust converted one of its schools (The Belvedere School) back into the maintained sector. Maria also encouraged the GPDSC to set up teaching training Departments to train the next generation of teachers. Maria retired from the Council of the GPDSC in 1890 and was made a vice-president of the organisation.

In 1878, she helped found a teacher training college with The Teachers' Training and Registration Society. In 1885 the college was renamed The Maria Grey Training College for Women. In 1976 the college merged with Borough Road College to form the West London Institute of Higher Education, which is now part of Brunel University.

=== Later life and death ===
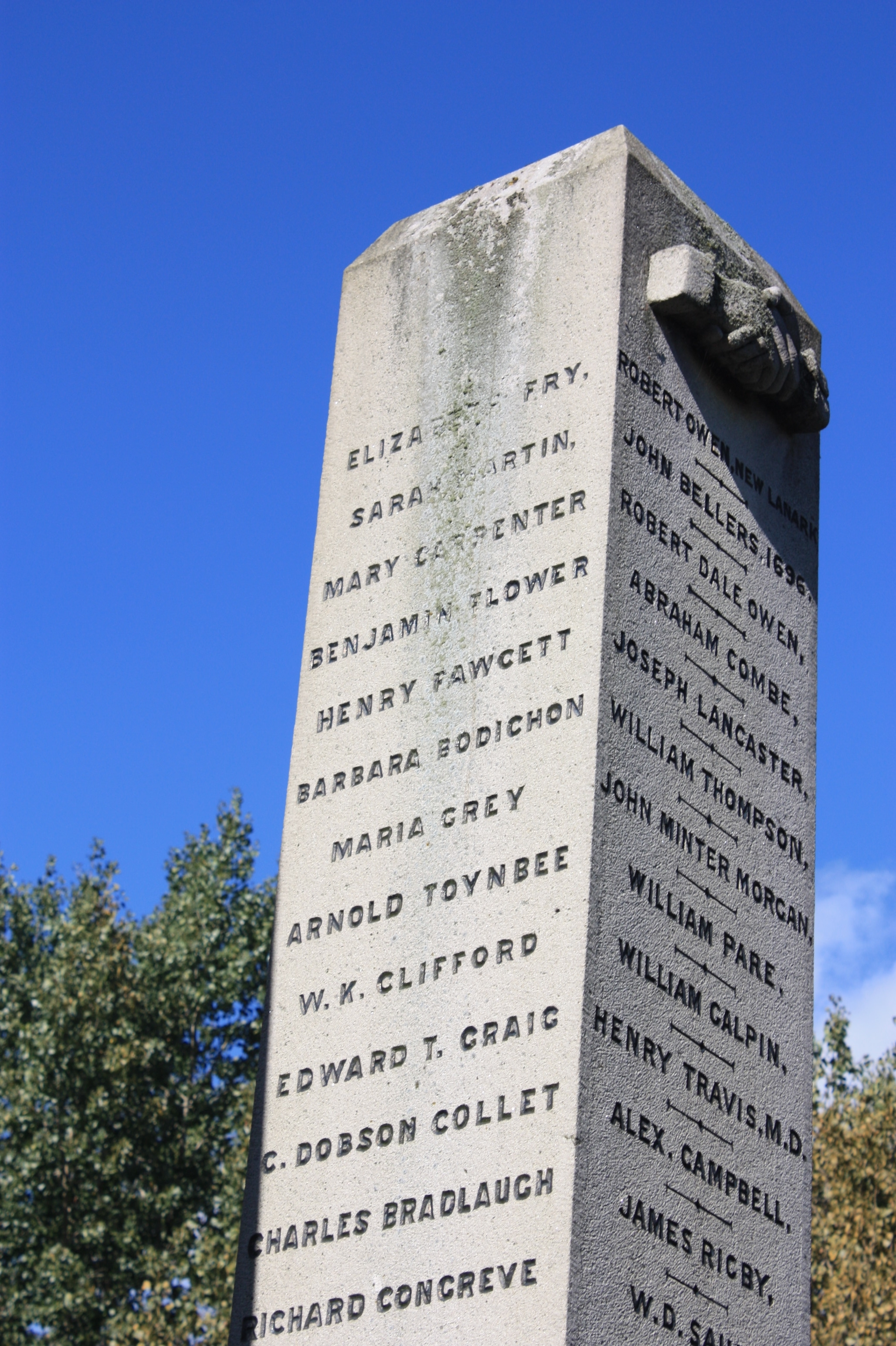
Detail of the Reformers' Memorial at Kensal Green Cemetery, with Maria Grey’s name

Maria continued to give speeches and write through the 1880s. By 1890, she became too ill to be active and for last 15 years of her life, Maria lived in strict retirement due to ill health.

Despite her ill health and Emily's death in 1897 she wrote her Last Words to Girls on Life in School and after School in 1889. She died at age 90 on 19 September 1906, at 41 Stanhope Gardens, Kensington, London, the house in which she had lived with Emily.

== Publications and lectures ==
- Shirreff, Maria Georgina and Shirreff, Emily (published anonymously) (1841). Passion and Principle. Edited by Captain Schmier. London.
- Grey, Maria Georgina; Shirreff, Emily (1850). Thoughts on Self-Culture Addressed to Women. London.
- Grey, Maria Georgina (1868). Love's Sacrifice [A novel]. London.
- Grey, Maria Georgina (1870). Is the Exercise of the Suffrage unfeminine?. London.
- Grey, Maria Georgina (1871). Education of Women [Letter to the Editor of the "Times"]. London.
- Grey, Mrs William (1871). The School Board of London. Three Addresses by Mrs William Grey in the Borough of Chelsea with a speech by William Groves, Esq., Q.C, F.R.S. London: William Ridgeway.
- Grey, Maria Georgina (1871). On the Education of Women. A paper read by Mrs William Grey at the meeting of the Society of Arts, May 31, 1871. London.
- Grey, Mrs William (1872). On the Special Requirements for improving the education of Girls, (paper read at the Social Science Congress, October 1871). London: William Ridgeway.
- Grey, Maria Georgina (1872). The National Union for improving the Education of Women. A letter to the Editor of "The Times". London.
- Grey, Mrs William (1874). 'Idols of Society or Gentility and Femininity' republished from 'Fraser's Magazine'. London: William Ridgeway.
- Grey, Maria Georgina (1875). 'Old Maids', A lecture. London.
- Grey, Maria Georgina (1 November 1879). "Men and Women". Fortnightly Review. 26 (155).
- Grey, Maria Georgina (1 June 1881). "Men and Women: A Sequel". Fortnightly Review. 29.
- Grey, Maria Georgina (1884). "The Women's Educational Movement.". In Stanton, T (ed.). The Women Question in Europe: A Series of Original Essays. London.
- Grey, Maria Georgina (1889) [1888]. Last words to Girls on life in school and after school. London: Rivingtons.

== Biographical sources ==
- "Obituary of Mrs William Grey". The Times. 21 September 1906.
- "In Memoria. Mrs William Grey". The Guardian. 26 September 1906.
- Morrison, Oonagh (2 June 1966). "The Woman of Purpose". The Lady.
- Kamm, Josephine (1971). Indicative Past: A Hundred Years of the Girl's Public Day School Trust. London: George Allen & Unwin.
- Ellsworth, Edward W (1979). Liberators of the Female Mind: The Shirreff Sisters, Educational Reform and the Women's Movement. Westport: Greenwood Press.
- Levine, Philippa (October 2004). "Grey, Maria Georgina (1816–1906)". Oxford Dictionary of National Biography. Oxford University Press.

== See also ==
- Emily Anne Eliza Shirreff
- Girls' Day School Trust

== Primary sources ==
- The Cambridge University Library, Department of Manuscripts and University Archives hold a series of correspondence from Maria, 1829–1848.
- The Institute of Education Archives holds the records of the Girls' Day School Trust which contain some papers of Maria Grey (reference code: GDS/A).
