= Sorabji (disambiguation) =

Kaikhosru Shapurji Sorabji (1892–1988) was an English composer, pianist, writer and music critic.

Sorabji or Sorabjee is a Parsi surname and given name. It may refer to:

== As a given name ==
- Sorabji Colah (1902–1950), Indian cricketer
- Sorabji Pochkhanawala (1881–1937), Indian banker and one of the founders of the Central Bank of India

== As a surname ==
- Alice Maude Sorabji Pennell (1874–1951), Indian physician and writer
- Cornelia Sorabji (1866–1954), first woman barrister from India, social reformer and writer
- Francina Sorabji (1833–1910), Indian educator and Christian missionary, mother of Cornelia, Susie, and Alice Maude Sorabji
- Richard Sorabji (born 1934), British historian of philosophy
- Susie Sorabji (1868–1931), Indian educator and Christian missionary
- Soli Sorabjee (1930–2021), Indian jurist
