= Caroline Bishop =

Caroline Bishop may refer to:

- Caroline Bishop (EastEnders), a character on the British soap opera EastEnders
- Caroline Bishop (kindergarten) (1846–1929), British advocate for kindergartens
