= Geraldine Cadbury =

British writer and reformer

Geraldine Southall Cadbury
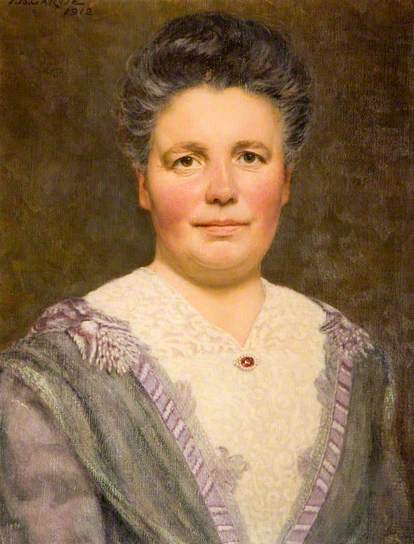
- Geraldine Cadbury by Thomas Bowman Garvie
- Born: Geraldine Southall; 29 June 1864; Birmingham, England
- Died: 30 January 1941 (aged 76)
- Education: Quaker school, The Mount, York
- Occupations: Writer and reformer
- Spouse: Barrow Cadbury
- Children: 3
- Parents: Alfred Southall (father); Anna Strangman Grubb (mother)

Dame Geraldine Cadbury, DBE (née Southall; 29 June 1864 – 30 January 1941) was a British Quaker, author, social and penal reformer. Geraldine was one of the first women in Birmingham to become a magistrate. From 1923, she chaired the justices’ panel in the Children's Court of Birmingham. In the 1930s she assumed prominent positions on several Home Office Committees and International Associations.

== Early life ==
Geraldine Southall was born in Birmingham, the daughter of Alfred Southall (1838–1931), a chemist by trade and a temperance worker who taught a working men's adult school class, whilst her Irish mother, Anna Strangman Grubb (1841–1912), was a supporter of women's suffrage. Geraldine was educated at Edgbaston High School for Girls and briefly at the Quaker school, The Mount, York. She married Barrow Cadbury (1862–1958) in 1891 with whom she had three children, Dorothy Adlington Cadbury, (1892–1987), Paul Strangman Cadbury (1895–1984), and Geraldine Mary Cadbury (1900–1999).

== Social and Penal Reform ==
Geraldine Cadbury worked as a volunteer social worker in Birmingham’s pioneering Children’s Court and as a volunteer probation worker. The Greet Free Kindergarten in Birmingham was opened in a room supplied by Geraldine Cadbury in 1904 using staff from the Froebel college in Edgbaston.

It was the initiative of Julia Lloyd, a Quaker, of the banking family who had studied in Germany at the Pestalozzi-Froebel Haus and then returned to work with Caroline Bishop.

In 1920, following the Sex Disqualification (Removal) Act of 1919, Geraldine was one of the first women in Birmingham to become a magistrate. From 1923, she chaired the justices’ panel in the Children’s Court. In 1925, Geraldine was appointed to the Home Office Departmental Committee on the Treatment of Young Offenders; which paved the way for the Children and Young Persons Act 1933.

In 1928, Geraldine helped design the second purpose-built juvenile court in England and over the next few years, she was appointed to a number of prominent positions on Home Office Committees and International Associations, including;

- 1930 Home Office Committee to Enquire Into Juvenile Courts in the Metropolitan Police District
- 1932 and the Home Office Juvenile Court Rules Committee
- 1934 Conference on Girls aged 15–17 Appearing before London Juvenile Courts
- 1935 Appointed Vice-president of the International Association of Children’s Court judges
- 1938 Home Office Committee to consider Observation Centres

Geraldine Southall Cadbury travelled widely investigating juvenile justice provision in Europe, America, New Zealand and Australia.

In 1938, she published Young Offenders Yesterday and To-day, Published by George Allen & Unwin, 1938, a history of the treatment of young offenders in England from the reign of Athelstan in the tenth century to Geraldine's experiences of the juvenile justice system.

She was also known for her opposition to the death penalty and from 1923 supported the work of what later became the National Council for the Abolition of the Death Penalty.

== Death ==
Dame Geraldine Cadbury died in 1941, in Birmingham, aged 76.

== Awards ==
In 1918, she received the Medal of Queen Elisabeth of Belgium in recognition of her humanitarian service in World War I

In 1937, she was made Dame Commander of the Order of the British Empire for public and philanthropic services in Birmingham.

== The Barrow Cadbury Trust ==
The Barrow Cadbury Trust was founded in 1920 by Barrow and Geraldine Cadbury.
