= Martha Beatrice Webb (medical doctor) =

English medical doctor (1863 – 1951)

Martha Beatrice Webb (1863 – 1951) was an English medical doctor and lecturer who worked to maintain the health of working women during World War I. She left behind publications on practical health and a letter-book describing her experience at medical school.

== Early life ==
She was born 20 October 1863 in Disley, Cheshire, the elder of two children of cotton manufacturer Philip Webb and his wife Frances, née Richards. She was educated privately and, after a four-year period of ill health which she later attributed to anaemia, she studied natural sciences at Newnham College, Cambridge, from 1887–90.

== Medical studies ==
After a ten-year career as a science teacher at Edgbaston High School for Girls, she returned to what she felt was her first vocation of medical science. She studied at the University of Birmingham Medical School between 1902 and 1908. Her letter-book records her experience as one of the first women medical students there. Upon graduating with an MB ChB from Edinburgh in 1907 and MD in 1908, she established a general practice from her home in Edgbaston, where she practiced for 25 years.

== World War I ==
During World War I, Webb served as medical investigator to the Ministry of Munitions. Her work as medical lecturer to welfare supervisors, who were responsible for the health of workers in munitions factories, led to her publishing books and pamphlets of practical advice for the maintenance of everyday health.

She also served as a recruiting officer for the Women's Army Auxiliary Corps.

=== Publications ===
- Health for Working Girls (London, 1917)
- Teaching Children as to Reproduction (1917)
- On Keeping Well (1918)

== Later career ==
In the early 1920s, Webb was appointed part-time lecturer in personal hygiene to women students at the University of Birmingham, where she was also medical officer to the department of education. She successfully proposed the appointment of a woman tutor and founded several social clubs for medical women in Birmingham.

She supported the British Medical Association's campaign for equal pay for men and women, and opposed a marriage bar which would have restricted employment for married women.

Retiring in 1932, she died in Birmingham on 14 February 1951. Her obituary praised her as 'a pioneer in social medicine' who helped with the progress of women's higher education and entry into the professions.

=== Positions held ===
- Council member of British Medical Women's Federation (1923–5)
- President of the Birmingham Association of Medical Women
- Vice-president of the Birmingham Medical Institute
- Co-founder and President of the Birmingham branch of the Soroptimist Club (1933–4)
