= Alice Cooper (disambiguation) =

Alice Cooper is the stage name of musician Vincent Furnier (born 1948).

Alice Cooper may also refer to:

- Alice Cooper (band), the rock band fronted by Furnier
- Alice Cooper (teacher) (1846–1917), British headmistress
- Alice Cooper (rugby union), English rugby union player
- Alice Cooper (sculptor) (1875–1937), American sculptor
- Alice Cooper, a character on the television show Mayberry R.F.D. portrayed by Alice Ghostley
- Alice Cooper (Archie Comics)
  - Alice Cooper, a character on the television show Riverdale portrayed by Mädchen Amick
