= Julia Lloyd (kindergarten) =

British educationalist

- Born: 13 April 1867; Wednesbury
- Died: 7 April 1955 (aged 87); Exmouth
- Known for: starting a first nursery

Julia Lloyd (13 April 1867 – 7 April 1955) was a British philanthropist and educationalist. She was interested in the newly developed methods for teaching young children in kindergartens. She opened Birmingham's first nursery school based on Froebelian principles.

== Life ==
Lloyd was born in Wednesbury in 1867. She was the daughter of the ironmaster Samuel and Jane Eliza (née Janson) Lloyd and she went to school locally at the only school for girls, Edgbaston High School for Girls, in 1881. In 1888 she studied under Caroline Bishop who had developed her own adapted ideas which she taught at the Froebel College in nearby Edgbaston. After this she worked in two different establishments. Lloyd studied in Germany under Annette Hamminck-Schepel at the Pestalozzi-Fröbel-Haus in Berlin from 1895 to 1896 and she then returned to work with Caroline Bishop.

== Birmingham's first nursery school ==
The free Kindergarten in Greet, Birmingham was in a room supplied by Geraldine Cadbury and it opened in 1904 using staff from Bishop's college in Edgbaston. This was the first nursery school in Birmingham. It was the initiative of Lloyd. She had been interested in getting Birmingham's School Board interested in Kindergartens, but she saw that they saw these ideas as a way to spice up conventional classes, whereas Lloyd wanted to see them as a basis for children's education. The children grew their own vegetables, visited farms and used their own hands to turn the fleece from their pet lamb into knitted garments for the dolls house. In response to the first world war the kindergarten was renamed a nursery school.

In 1907 the praise that she received about the Greet Kindergarten enabled her to open a second kindergarten which was again in a poor area of Birmingham. A woman's centre was chosen in Summer Lane and Lloyd gave strong leadership but also allowed her staff the freedom to manage. Again the children visited farms and received stimulation whilst they played, and worked, at tasks around pets and horticulture. The Greet Kindergarten had received glowing reports from educators and inspectors who saw that the children co-operated whilst achieving Lloyd's objectives of not only improving intelligence but also curiosity, social skills, hygiene and order. The mothers of children who attended free kindergartens were not appreciated and the children were thought to be bribed by their parents, over indulged and allowed to stay up late. This lack of discipline was a problem that the Kindergarten tried to mitigate.

The following year a third location was started. With three locations the Birmingham People's Kindergarten Association was created with Lloyd as the honorary secretary. This was to become the Birmingham Nursery Schools' Association in 1917. The following year the 1918 Education Act appeared to place nursery education as a statutory right. A recently opened fourth nursery was closed with the optimism the Local Education Authorities would now supply nursery education. The LEA's did supply money to Lloyd's free kindergartens and Margaret McMillans nursery in Deptford was the first to receive LEA funding in 1917 but it was seen that the government was failing to heed "the message of the nineteenth century Froebelians.

By 1923 it was realised that they had failed to take the lead and Lloyd was there when the Nursery Schools Association was formed in Manchester. Bishop died in Exmouth.

== Legacy ==
The current Selly Oak Nursery School dates from the nursery school opened by Lloyd, Cadbury and Bishop in 1904. When Lloyd died the Selly Oak Committee commented on their "pride in their links with her pioneering work for the children of the City". Lloyd herself made a number of charitable bequests but the major part went to fund a readership at the University of Birmingham in Social Philosophy.
