= James Manning (lawyer) =

English barrister, serjeant-at-law and law writer

James Manning (1781–1866) was an English barrister, serjeant-at-law and law writer.

== Biography ==
Manning, born in 1781 in Exeter, was son of James Manning, a Unitarian minister, by his wife Lydia, daughter of John Edge of Bristol. He early acquired a familiarity with history, antiquities, and the European languages. He was called to the Bar at Lincoln's Inn on 23 June 1817, and went the Western circuit, of which he was for many years the leader.

His reputation rested mainly upon his learning. He was no orator, and his powers of advocacy were slight; but as a junior he obtained much business. By his knowledge of copyhold law he secured a perpetual retainer from the lord of the manor of Taunton Dean, Somerset, whose rights were the subject of continual litigation. He enjoyed the friendship of Lords Brougham and Denman, and rendered them assistance in the defence of Queen Caroline.

Following the passing of the Reform Act in 1832 Manning was appointed as a revising barrister in which office he served the Borough of Newport in the Isle of Wight. He was appointed recorder of Sudbury in 1836, and recorder of Oxford and Banbury in November 1837, three offices which he held till his death.

He was raised to the degree of a serjeant-at-law on 19 February 1840, received a patent of precedence in April 1845, and was made Queen's ancient sergeant in 1846. This dignity, revived at his own suggestion after a long interval of dormancy, entitled him to a seat in the House of Lords ex officio, but gave him no right of speaking, unless consulted, or of voting.

He became judge of the Whitechapel County Court in March 1847, from which he retired in February 1863 on an annual pension of £700. He died at 44 Phillimore Gardens, South Kensington, London, on 29 August 1866.

He was twice married: first, on 7 September 1820, to Clarissa, daughter of William Palmer of Kimbolton, Herefordshire (died 15 December 1847, aged 51); and secondly, on 3 December 1857, to Charlotte, daughter of Isaac Solly of Leyton, Essex, and widow of William Speir, M.D., of Calcutta (died 1 April 1871). Their daughters were Charlotte Manning and Elizabeth Adelaide Manning.

== Publications ==
- A Digested Index to the Nisi Prius Reports of T. Peake, I. Espinasse, and Lord Campbell, with Notes and References, 1813.
- The Practice of the Exchequer of Pleas, Appendix, 1816.
- A Digest of the Nisi Prius Reports, with Notes and References, 1820.
- The Practice of the Court of Exchequer, Revenue Branch, 1827, with an appendix containing an inquiry into the tenure of the conventionary estates in Cornwall, 1827.
- Serviens ad Legem: a Report of Proceedings … in relation to a Warrant for the Suppression of the Antient Privileges of the Serjeants-at-Law, 1840.
- Observations on the Debate to make lawful Marriages within certain of the Prohibited Degrees of Affinity, 1854.
- An Inquiry into the Character and Origin of the Possessive Augment in English and in cognate Dialects, 1864.
- Thoughts upon Subjects connected with Parliamentary Reform, 1866.

With Archer Ryland :

- Reports of Cases in Court of King's Bench, 8 Geo. IV–11 Geo. IV, 1828–37, 5 vols.

With T. C. Granger:

- Cases in the Court of Common Pleas, 1841–6, 7 vols.

With T. C. Granger and J. Scott:

- Common Bench Reports, 1846–57, 9 vols.
