= National Indian Association (disambiguation) =

The National Indian Association was a British organisation concerned with women and education in India.

National Indian Association may also refer to:

- Women's National Indian Association, American organisation concerned with Native Americans
- Indian National Association, Organisation in India
