= Pennell High School =

Pennell High School Bannu

Location
- Bannu, Khyber-Pakhtunkhwa; Pakistan
- Coordinates: 32.988502°N 70.606333°E

Information
- Motto: Ever Onward
- Religious affiliations: Diocese of Peshawar, Church of Pakistan
- Established: 1865
- Principal: Fredrick Farhan Das
- Syndicate Leaders: Farman Nawaz, Shehnaz, Riffat
- Campus: Urban
- Website: pennell.byethost4.com

Pennell High School is a school located in Bannu, Khyber Pakhtunkhwa. It is the second oldest educational institute in the Khyber Pakhtunkhwa.

It was founded in 1865 by Theodore Leighton Pennell (11 March 1867 – 23 December 1912), an English Protestant missionary and doctor, as Bannu Mission School. Dr. T.L. Pennell remained its principal from 1893 until his death in 1912. After his untimely death, The school grew and rose to national recognition and was renamed Pennell High School in his memory.

== History ==
Bannu Mission School was started by those interested in the work of the Church Mission Society, for ameliorating the condition of the people of Bannu in 1865. The school was hosted in the old Dak Bungalow – long since demolished – which was lent by the Deputy Commissioner for this purpose. The number of boys on roll then was 12. In 1866 there were 75 boys on roll and the number eventually went up to 346 in 1903 and 600 in 1914. Rev. T. J. L. Mayer became the first manager in 1874 and remained till 1891. Mr. T. Benjamin became the first Headmaster in 1874 and remained in service till 1911. In 1893 came the Doctor, evangelist and educationist Theodore Leighton Pennell, M.D., B.Sc., F.R.C.S. and became the first principal. He did a lot for the school. He died on 23 March 1912. The present name was given to Mission School in memory of this educator. Rev. M.E. Wigram became the Principal in 1912 and after Dr. Pennell, much of the credit for raising the school to a high level efficiency and usefulness goes to him. In 1936 the post of the principal and the headmaster were amalgamated and for the first time in the history of the school a national Rev. B.C Ishwar Dass became the principal. In 1947, the school suffered badly. The staff left during partition, but Mr. Christopher, kept the school going until Principal Victor S. Joseph took it over from him in 1952 for thirty years. After him along with many others, Principal Asghar Dean and Mr. Naseem Shahid served the institution and tried to maintain the standard of the school. In 1995, under the dynamic leadership of Rt. Rev. Mano Rumalshah, Bishop of Peshawar, a decision was made to reconstruct the school building and to change the medium of instruction from Urdu to English. Mr. Paul Lewis Cooper, a Missionary and an Educationist, from New Zealand, was appointed as Principal. He worked not only on the academic side, but also on the construction side. In March 2005, Pennell High School, English Medium, Bannu sent its first badge of boys and girls of Matric for SSC Board examination. All the students passed the exam in first division. In 2005 Mr. Justin John became the principal of the school. On 12 July 2006, the high school was promoted to a ‘Higher Secondary School and College’.

== Modern history ==
=== Missiles Attack on school ===
The US drone attack took place on 19 & 20 November 2008 and the Taliban, in retaliation, hit the Bannu district with 16 missiles. Two missiles struck Pennell High School causing damage to the school’s building, especially the science laboratory and some classrooms, but there was no human loss as the attack took place at night.

=== Anti-Charlie Hebdo protesters storm the school ===
One January 27, 2015 hundreds of students protesting against a French magazine for publishing blasphemous cartoons of Muhammad stormed this school demanding its closure. Four students were slightly hurt in the incident.
