= Isaac Solly =

British merchant

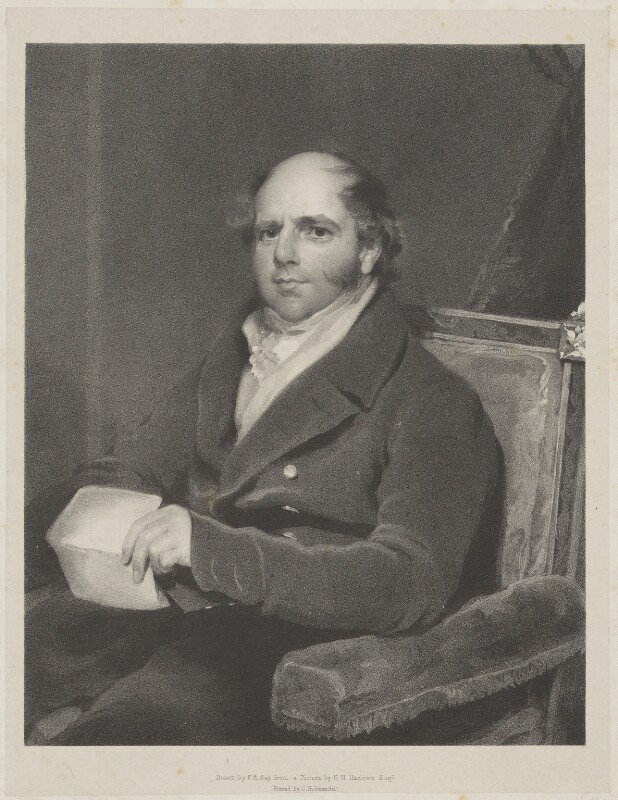
Isaac Solly

Isaac Solly (1769 – 22 February 1853) was a London merchant in the Baltic trade. During the Napoleonic Wars his company Isaac Solly and Sons were principal contractors supplying hemp and timber to government dockyards.

== Early life and family ==
He was the son of Isaac Solly of London and Walthamstow (1725–1802) and Elizabeth Neal, from a noted family of Protestant Dissenters. He was born in their London house in St Mary Axe, site of the Baltic Exchange. His brother Edward Solly, a famous collector of paintings, was stationed in Berlin. His sister, Elizabeth Solly, married Dr William Lister FRSE in 1793.

== Career ==
Solly founded the company Isaac Solly and Sons, which became a major player in the British timber trade with the Baltics. The family concern suffered a serious setback when twenty of their ships, laden with merchandise, were confiscated and taken to Copenhagen, during the Napoleonic Blockade.

In addition to this business, Solly served as a director of the Million Bank, chairman of the London Dock Company, founding chairman of the London and Birmingham Railway, chairman of the British and American Steam Navigation Company, and Governor of the Royal Exchange Assurance Corporation. He was also amongst the original proprietors of the London University.

In 1803 he bought Leyton House, a great house in Leyton. The previous occupant, Joseph Cotton, was a director of the East India Company.

In 1816 he became an overseer of the poor and in 1825 he also became churchwarden. He was declared bankrupt in 1837 during the banking crisis of that year. He died in Chestnut Walk, Leyton, at his son's house.

== Marriage and children ==
Solly married Mary Harrison on 27 July 1795. They had ten children. His daughter Charlotte Solly wrote several books on old India. His son Samuel Solly, F.R.S. was a distinguished surgeon, while Henry Solly was a social reformer and founder of working men's clubs. His grandchildren included the social activists Adelaide Manning and Caroline Bishop, who both championed kindergartens, among other causes.
