= Dorothy Adlington Cadbury =

British botanist and company director (1892–1987)

- Dorothy Adlington Cadbury
- Born: 14 October 1892; Birmingham, Warwickshire, England
- Died: 21 August 1987 (aged 94); Birmingham, England
- Parent: Geraldine Cadbury

Dorothy Adlington Cadbury (14 October 1892 – 21 August 1987) was an English botanist and director of confectionery company Cadbury's. She was an expert on pondweeds, collecting many Potamogeton samples for the British Museum, and was the lead author of the main flora of Warwickshire in the 20th century.

== Life ==
Born in Birmingham in 1892, she was the oldest child of Dame Geraldine Cadbury (1864–1941) and Barrow Cadbury (1862–1958). She was raised as a Quaker, and remained a committed member of the society throughout her life.

Cadbury worked in the Cadbury factory for a year, and then worked as director of confectionery company Cadbury's. She became involved with the International Industrial Relations Institute, serving as its treasurer until resigning at their second conference in 1928. She was also managing chair of the Bournville Women’s Works Council.

Following her retirement from Cadbury's she devoted her time to botany and became an expert on pond weeds. Cadbury had maintained a wildflower collection as a child, collecting around 1000 specimens with her mother, and for the rest of her life enjoyed ‘painting in’ the illustrations in her childhood copy of Bentham & Hooker ‘s Flora of the British Isles. She joined the Wild Flower Society in 1929. She became a member of the Botanical Society of the British Isles in 1936. In 1950, Cadbury joined the Birmingham Natural History Society (BNHS), and soon after made a complete list of Edgbaston Park flowering plants. She was the lead author of A Computer Mapped Flora, published in 1971, the main flora of Warwickshire in the 20th century. Cadbury collected 400 potamogeton samples from around Britain for The British Museum.

Dorothy Cadbury's name appears on the side of tubs of Cadbury Roses, with the company stating they were named after her favourite flowers, roses, which grew in the gardens of the original factory at Bournville.

Dorothy Cadbury died in 1987, aged 94 years old. The rare hybrid Potamogeton x. cadburyae is named after her. An undated portrait of Cadbury by Elliot and Fry is held at the National Portrait Gallery in London.
