= Phillimore Gardens =

Street in Kensington, West London, England

Coordinates: 51.50078°N 0.19870°W

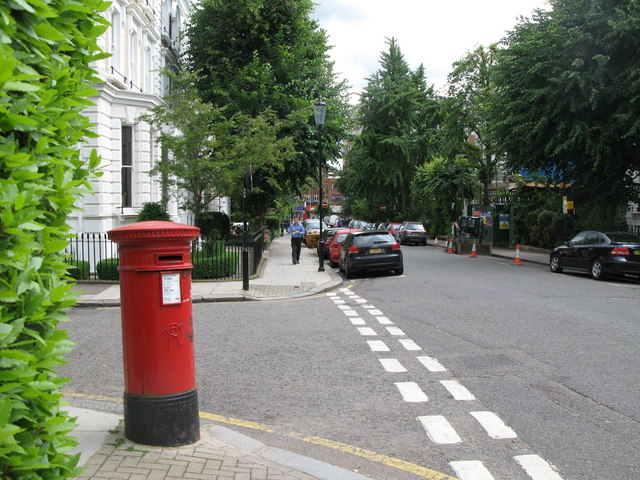
Phillimore Gardens, W8 - geograph.org.uk - 851059

Phillimore Gardens is a street in Kensington, West London, England.

Phillimore Gardens runs roughly north to south from Duchess of Bedford's Walk to Kensington High Street. The houses on the west side all back on to Holland Park.

== History ==
The road was built on the Phillimore Estate, on land acquired by the Phillimore family in the early 18th century, and much of which is still owned by them. Speculative building began within 10 years of William Phillimore succeeding to the estate in 1779.

In 2014, one of the 10 most expensive houses sold in London, at £19.75m, was on the street.

In 2022, it was the most expensive street in England, with an average house price of £23.8m, according to Halifax.

== Notable residents ==
- No 34 was home to Sir William Dunn, 1st Baronet, of Lakenheath, banker, merchant, MP and philanthropist.
- No 36, the most expensive house in the street at £4,109 12s, was built for Lady George Paulet, widow of Admiral Lord George Paulet, and her son, St. John Claud Paulet.
- No 44 was home to James Manning, the barrister and writer, who died there in 1866. His wife, Charlotte Manning, founded the Kensington Society at their home in 1865.
- Admiral Sir William Hutcheon Hall, lived in the street, and died there in 1878.
