= William Lister (physician) =

British physician

William Lister FRSE LRCP (5 April 1756 – 3 February 1830) was a British physician who became Governor of St Thomas' Hospital.

== Life ==
He was born at Ware, Hertfordshire on 5 April 1756. He was sent north to Scotland to study medicine at the University of Edinburgh gaining a doctorate in 1781. He then began working at various hospitals in London. In 1788 he was elected a Fellow of the Royal Society of Edinburgh. His proposers were Dugald Stewart, James Russell and Henry Duncan.

In 1789 he moved as head physician to the London Smallpox Hospital. In 1795 he moved to St Thomas' Hospital in London, replacing Dr Crawford, and stayed there until retiral in 1817. At this point he was made Governor of the hospital, a role requiring no work.

Lister died of heart disease on 3 February 1830 at his home in Lincoln's Inn Fields in London

== Family ==
In February 1793 he married Elizabeth Solly, daughter of Isaac Solly, a wealthy London merchant, and sister to Isaac Solly, a Baltic trader. He was uncle by marriage to Samuel Solly FRS.

The couple had at least three daughters, including Sarah (1803–1810). His son, Nathaniel Lister, was also a doctor at St Thomas Hospital.

== Artistic recognition ==
His bust by William Behnes stands in the entrance of St Thomas's Hospital in London. The bust was created around 1820 (during Lister’s time as Governor) and presented to the hospital in 1869 by his son.
