= Cornelia Sorabji =

Indian barrister, writer, and social reformer (1866–1954)

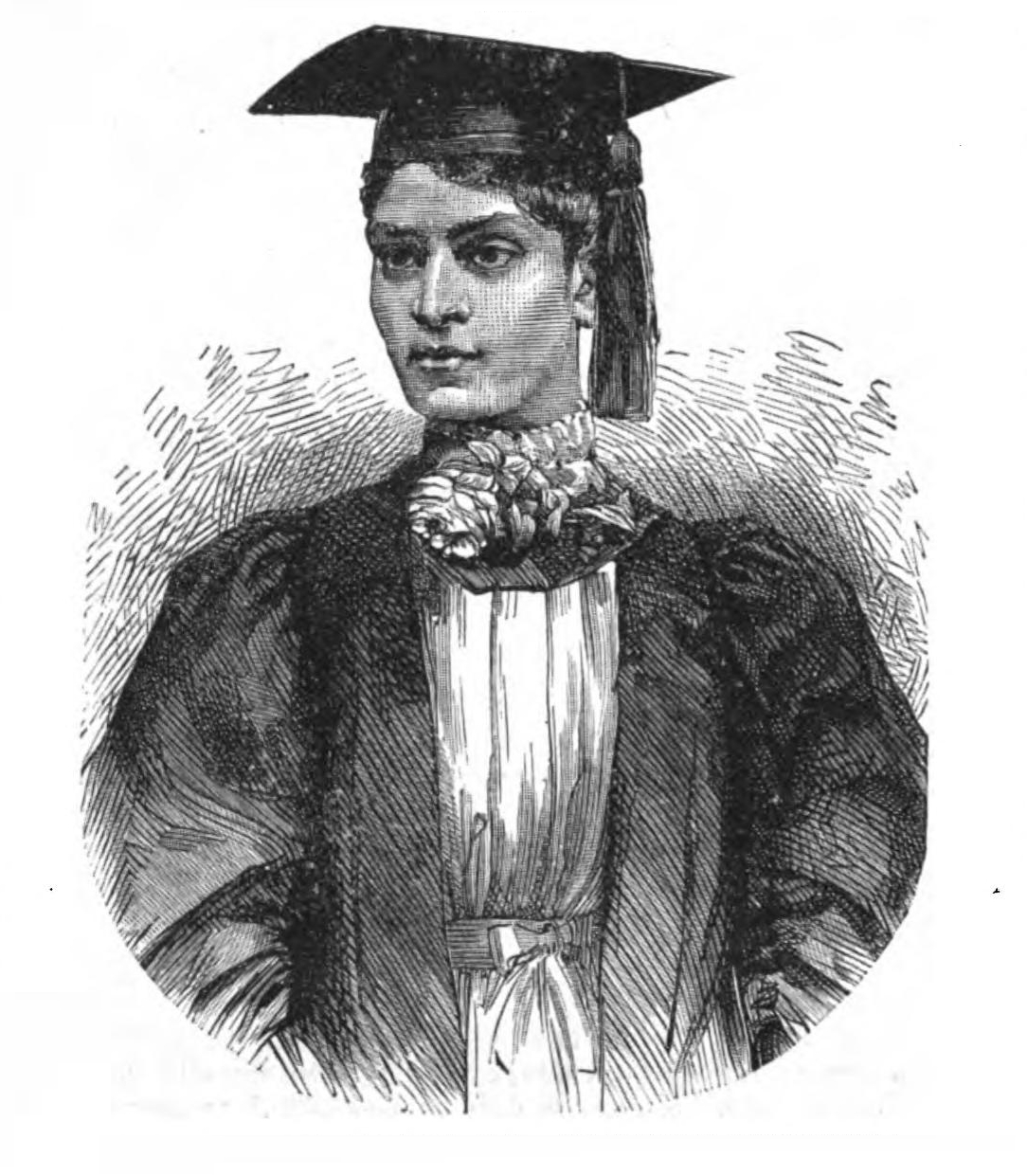
- Cornelia Sorabji at graduation
- Born: 15 November 1866; Nashik, Bombay Presidency, British India
- Died: 6 July 1954 (aged 87); London, United Kingdom
- Education: Bombay University; Somerville College, Oxford
- Occupations: Lawyer, social reformer, writer
- Mother: Francina Ford
- Relatives: Susie Sorabji (sister); Alice Pennell (sister); Richard Sorabji (nephew)

Cornelia Sorabji (15 November 1866 – 6 July 1954) was an Indian lawyer, social reformer and writer. She was the first female graduate from Bombay University, and the first woman to study law at Oxford University. Returning to India after her studies at Oxford, Sorabji became involved in social and advisory work on behalf of the purdahnashins, women who were forbidden to communicate with the outside male world, but she was unable to defend them in court since, as a woman, she did not hold professional standing in the Indian legal system. Hoping to remedy this, Sorabji presented herself for the LLB examination of Bombay University in 1897 and the pleader's examination of Allahabad High Court in 1899. She became the first female advocate in India but would not be recognised as a barrister until the law which barred women from practising was changed in 1923.

She was involved with several social service campaigning groups, including the National Council for Women in India, the Federation of University Women, and the Bengal League of Social Service for Women. She opposed the imposition of Western perspectives on the movement for women's change in India, and took a cautious approach to social reform, opposing rapid change. Sorabji believed that until all women were educated, political reform would not be of genuine lasting value. She supported the British Raj, and purdah for upper-caste Hindu women, and opposed Indian self-rule. Her views prevented her obtaining the support needed to undertake later social reforms. Sorabji authored multiple publications, which were influential in the early 20th century.

== Early life and education ==
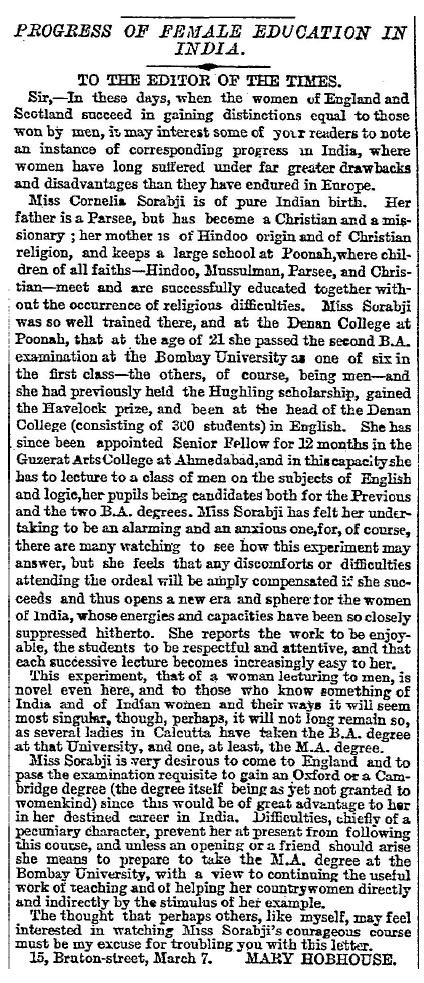
Letter by Mary Hobhouse, published in The Times, 13 April 1888, Sorabji

Cornelia Sorabji was born on 15 November 1866 in Nashik, in the Bombay Presidency, British India. She was one of ten children, and was named in honour of Lady Cornelia Maria Darling Ford, her adoptive grandmother. Her father, the Reverend Sorabji Karsedji, was a Christian missionary who had converted from Zoroastrianism, and Sorabji believed that she had been a key figure in convincing Bombay University to admit women to its degree programmes. Her mother, Francina Ford (née Santya), had been adopted at the age of twelve and brought up by a British couple, and helped to establish several girls' schools in Poona (now Pune). Her mother's support for girls' education, and care for the local needy, was an inspiration for Cornelia Sorabji to advocate for women. In her books, Cornelia Sorabji barely touched on religion (other than describing Parsi rituals), and did not write about any pressures relating to religious conversion in her autobiographical works.

Sorabji had five surviving sisters including educator and missionary Susie Sorabji and medical doctor Alice Pennell, and one surviving brother; two other brothers died in infancy. She spent her childhood initially in Belgaum and later in Pune. She received her education both at home and at mission schools. She enrolled in Deccan College, as its first woman student, and received the top marks in her cohort for the final degree examination, which would have entitled her to a government scholarship to study further in England. According to Sorabji, she was denied the scholarship, and instead took up a temporary position as a professor of English at Gujarat College, an educational institution for men.

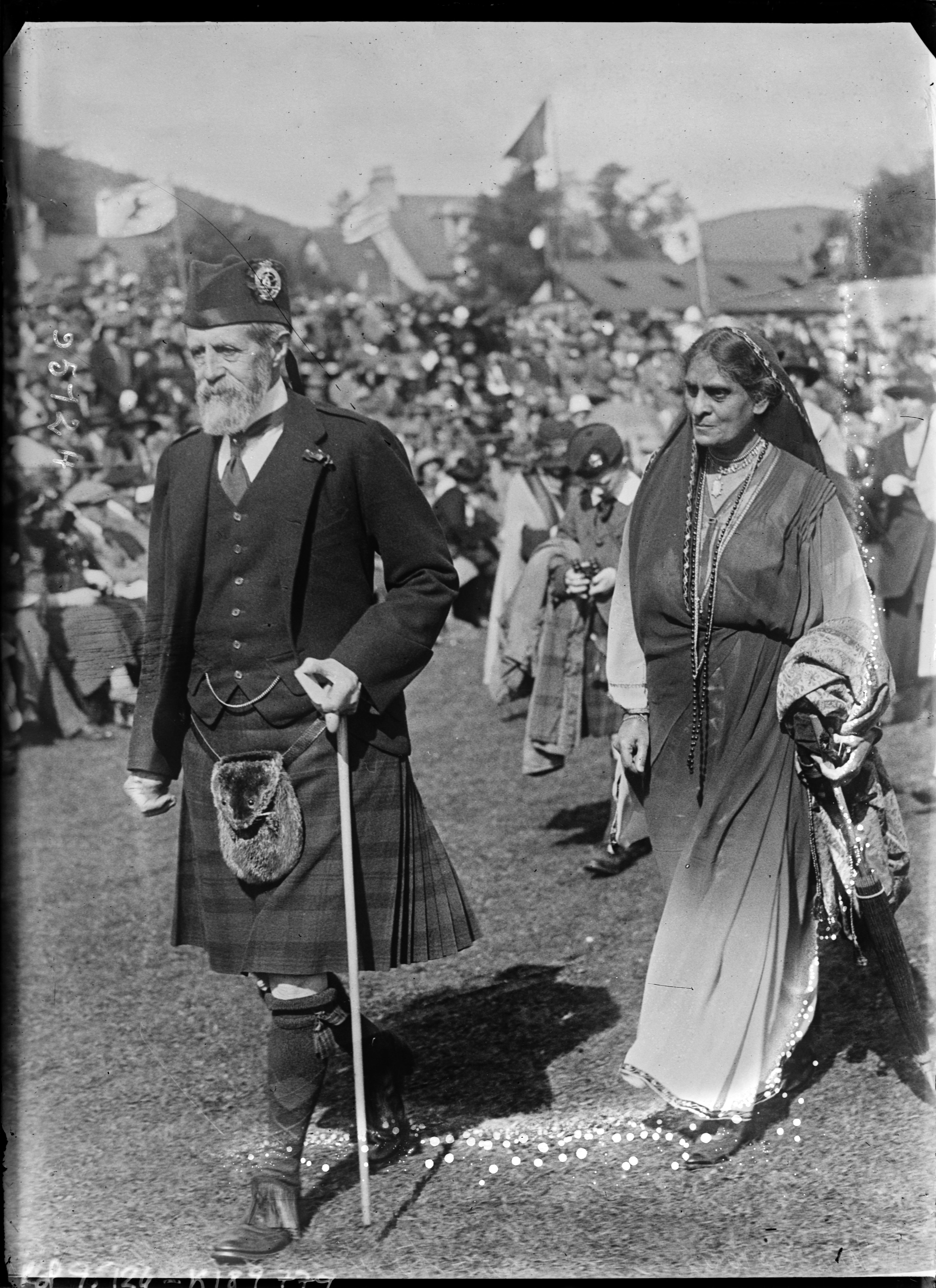
Cornelia Sorabji at the Braemar Gathering in 1924

She became the first female graduate of Bombay University, with a first-class degree in literature. Sorabji wrote in 1888 to the National Indian Association for assistance in completing her education. This was championed by Mary Hobhouse (whose husband Arthur was a member of the Council of India) and Adelaide Manning, who contributed funds, as did Florence Nightingale, Sir William Wedderburn and others. Sorabji arrived in England in 1889 and stayed with Manning and Hobhouse. In 1892, she was given special permission by Congregational Decree, due in large part to the petitions of her English friends, to take the post-graduate Bachelor of Civil Law exam at Somerville College, Oxford, becoming the first woman to ever do so. Sorabji was the first woman to be admitted as a reader to the Codrington Library of All Souls College, Oxford, at Sir William Anson's invitation in 1890.

== Legal career ==
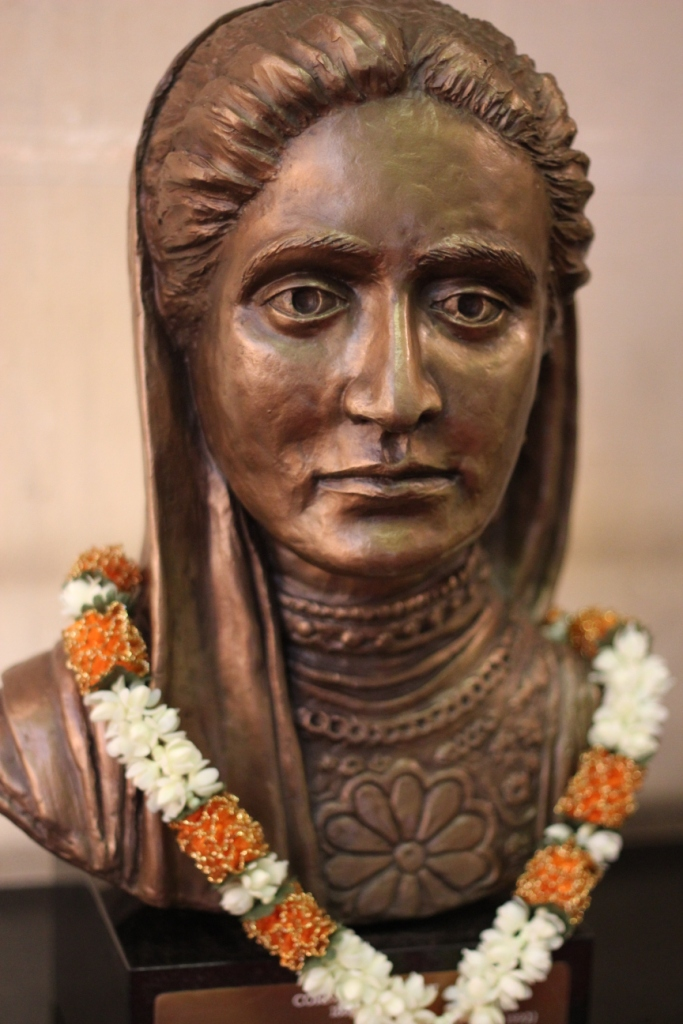
Cornelia Sorabji's bust in Lincoln's Inn, taken at the 2012 Gresham Special Lecture

Upon returning to India in 1894, Sorabji became involved in social and advisory work on behalf of the purdahnashins, women who were forbidden to communicate with the outside male world. In many cases, these women owned considerable property, yet had no access to the necessary legal expertise to defend it. Sorabji was given special permission to enter pleas on their behalf before British agents of Kathiawar and Indore principalities, but she was unable to defend them in court since, as a woman, she did not hold professional standing in the Indian legal system. Hoping to remedy this situation, Sorabji presented herself for the LLB examination of Bombay University in 1897 and the pleader's examination of Allahabad High Court in 1899. She was the first female advocate in India, but would not be recognised as a barrister until the law which barred women from practising was changed in 1923.

Sorabji began petitioning the India Office as early as 1902 to provide for a female legal advisor to represent women and minors in provincial courts. In 1904, she was appointed Lady Assistant to the Court of Wards of Bengal and by 1907, due to the need for such representation, Sorabji was working in the provinces of Bengal, Bihar, Orissa, and Assam. In the next 20 years of service, it is estimated that Sorabji helped over 600 women and orphans fight legal battles, sometimes at no charge. She would later write about many of these cases in her work Between the Twilights and her two autobiographies.

In April 1919, Sorabji spoke at a Union Society debate in the Old Hall of Lincoln's Inn in support of Helena Normanton's motion that the British legal profession should open to women. Normanton described how Sorabji's speech was "so eloquent, relevant, and telling, illustrated by analogies from her own legal work in India, that a handsome majority resulted in the end, in spite of much opposition". Normanton noted that the passing of the Sex Disqualification (Removal) Act, 1919, was partly a result of Sorabji's work and advocacy.

In 1923, the legal profession was opened to women in India, and Sorabji began practising in Calcutta. However, due to male bias and discrimination, she was confined to preparing opinions on cases, rather than pleading them before the court.

Sorabji retired from the high court in 1929, and settled in London, visiting India during the winters. She died in Northumberland House nursing home, Green Lanes, Manor House, London, on 6 July 1954, aged 87.

== Social and reform work ==
Sorabji's primary interest in her campaigning work was in social service. She took a circumspect approach to social reform, supporting the British Raj, purdah for upper-caste Hindu women, and opposing rapid reform, believing that until all women were educated, political reform would not provide "any real and lasting value". She also opposed the imposition of Western women's perspectives on the movement for women's change in India.

She was associated with the Bengal branch of the National Council of Women in India, the Federation of University Women, and the Bengal League of Social Service for Women. For her services to the Indian nation, she was awarded the Kaisar-i-Hind Gold Medal in 1909. Although an Anglophile, Sorabji had no desire to see "the wholesale imposition of a British legal system on Indian society any more than she sought the transplantation of other Western values." Early in her career, Sorabji had supported the campaign for Indian independence, relating women's rights to the capacity for self-government. Although she supported traditional Indian life and culture, Sorabji promoted reform of Hindu laws regarding child marriage and Sati by widows. She believed that the true impetus behind social change was education and that until the majority of illiterate women had access to it, the suffrage movement would be a failure. She was a member of Bharat Stree Mahamandal (The Great Circle of Indian Women) which promoted girls education.

By the late 1920s, however, Sorabji had adopted a staunch anti-nationalist attitude. By 1927, she was actively involved in promoting support for the Empire and preserving the rule of the British Raj. She favourably viewed the polemical attack on Indian self-rule in Katherine Mayo's book Mother India (1927), and condemned Mahatma Gandhi's campaign of civil disobedience. She toured to propagate her political views; her publicised beliefs would end up costing her the support needed to undertake later social reforms. One such failed project was the League for Infant Welfare, Maternity, and District Nursing.

Pallavi Rastogi, reviewing the autobiography India Calling, wrote that Sorabji's life was "fraught with contradictions", as were those of others who were unable to reconcile Western and Indian ways of life. Historian Geraldine Forbes argued that Sorabji's opposition to nationalism and feminism has "caused historians to neglect the role she played in giving credibility to the British critique of those educated women who were now part of the political landscape." For Leslie Flemming, Sorabji's autobiographical works are "a means of justifying her unusual life by constructing herself as a change-agent" and, although they are not widely read in modern terms, succeeded on those terms by having an influential readership in the early 20th century.

== Publications ==
In addition to her work as a social reformer and legal activist, Sorabji wrote a number of books, short stories and articles, including the following:

- 1901: Love and Life beyond the Purdah (London: Fremantle & Co.)
- 1904: Sun-Babies: Studies in the Child-life of India (London: Blackie & Son)
- 1908: Between the Twilights: Being studies of India women by one of themselves (London: Harper)
- 1916: Indian Tales of the Great Ones Among Men, Women and Bird-People (Bombay: Blackie)
- 1917: The Purdahnashin (Bombay: Blackie & Son)
- 1918: Sun Babies: Studies in Colour (London: Blackie & Son)
- 1920: Shubala – A Child-Mother (Calcutta: Baptist Mission Press)
- 1924: Therefore: An Impression of Sorabji Kharshedji Langrana and His Wife Francina (London: Oxford University Press, Humphrey Milford, 1924)
- 1930: Gold Mohur: Time to Remember (London: Alexander Moring)
- 1932: Susie Sorabji, Christian-Parsee Educationist of Western India: A Memoir (London: Oxford University Press)

Sorabji wrote two autobiographical works entitled India Calling: The Memories of Cornelia Sorabji (London: Nisbet & Co., 1934) and India Recalled (London: Nisbet & Co., 1936). She edited Queen Mary's Book for India (London: G. G. Harrap & Co., 1943), which had contributions from such authors as T. S. Eliot and Dorothy L. Sayers. She contributed to a number of periodicals, including The Asiatic Review, The Times Literary Supplement, Atlantic Monthly, Calcutta Review, The Englishman, Macmillan's Magazine, The Statesman and The Times.

== Memorials ==
In 2012, a bust of her was unveiled at Lincoln's Inn, London. A Google Doodle celebrated her 151st birthday on 15 November 2017.

== See also ==
- First women lawyers around the world
- List of Parsis

== Bibliography ==
- Flemming, Leslie (1994). "Between two worlds: self-construction and self-identity in the writings of three Nineteenth-century Indian Christian Women". In Kumar, Nita (ed.). Women as subjects : South Asian histories. Stree. ISBN 8185604037.
- Forbes, Geraldine (1996). Women in modern India. Cambridge University Press. ISBN 0521268125.
- Rappaport, Helen (2001). Encyclopedia of Women Social Reformers. Santa Barbara: ABC CLIO. ISBN 1576071014.
- Rastogi, Pallavi (2001). Jolly, Margaretta (ed.). Encyclopedia of Life Writing: Autobiographical and Biographical Forms. Vol. I. Fitzroy Dearborn. ISBN 157958232X.
- Sorabji, Cornelia (1934). India Calling: The Memories of Cornelia Sorabji. London: Nisbet & Co.
