= Mary Lyschinska =

Scottish-Polish Kindergarten teacher and writer (1849–1937)

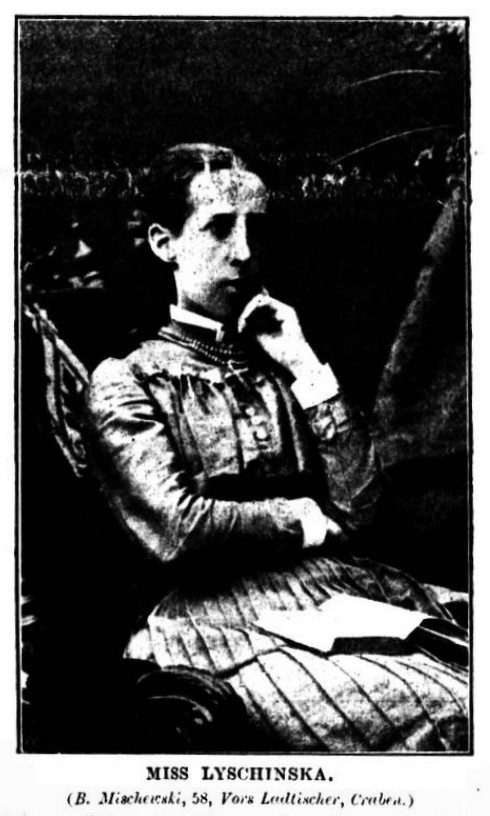
- Lyschinska in 1895
- Born: 11 November 1849; Edinburgh, Scotland
- Died: 30 July 1937 (aged 87); Wolfenbüttel, Lower Saxony, Germany
- Occupations: teacher, writer
- Employer: School Board for London

Mary Josephine Lyschinska (11 November 1849 – 30 July 1937), was a Scottish-Polish Kindergarten teacher and writer. She trained as a teacher at the Pestalozzi-Fröbel Haus in Germany and worked as Superintendent of Method in Infant Schools for the School Board for London. She wrote about teaching methods in books and journals.

== Early life ==
Lyschinska was born in Edinburgh, Scotland, and was from a Polish noble family that emigrated to Scotland in the 1830s, because of political persecution in their home country. Her father worked as a doctor and had married a Scottish women who he had met in Edinburgh during his studies in medicine. He was a supporter of education for women.

== Career ==
Lyschinska trained as a teacher at the Pestalozzi-Fröbel Haus in Germany, and moved to Paris to privately tutor the children of a noble family. After this appointment, she taught in England from 1879 under the School Board for London. She was promoted to became the Board's Superintendent of Method in Infant Schools, succeeding Catherine Bishop. She also served as Superintendent of Method for the 19th International Congress of Women.

Lyschinska was a follower of the revisionist educational methods advocated by the German pedagogue and founder of the kindergarten movement Friedrich Fröbel. She also worked with Henriette Schrader-Breymann, the niece of Fröbel, and later became her biographer.

Alongside teaching, Lyschinska wrote about the education field and published the book The Kindergarten Principle: Its Educational Value and Chief Applications in 1880, and Some Difficulties and Encouragements in Kindergarten Work in England with Suggestions on Early Culture. She wrote articles for publications like The Kindergarten Magazine and the Journal of Education, as well as essays for competitions on teaching methods and the ethics of the Fröbel methods. Lyschinska praised how the Fröbel methodology placed children in natural surroundings under the motherly direction of female teachers and in the midst of a household, garden and household pets. She also explained how the approach encouraged rather than punished children.

== Death ==
Lyschinska lived in her later years with the Breymann family until her death in 1937, in Wolfenbüttel, Lower Saxony, Germany, aged 87
