= Charlotte Manning =

First head of Girton College

- Born: Charlotte Solly; 30 March 1803
- Died: 1 April 1871 (aged 68); Westminster, England
- Occupations: Scholar and writer
- Known for: First head of Girton College
- Spouse: James Manning
- Parent: Isaac Solly
- Relatives: Adelaide Manning (step-daughter)

Charlotte Manning (née Solly; 30 March 1803 – 1 April 1871) was a British feminist, scholar and writer. She was the first head of Girton College.

== Family ==
Charlotte Solly was born in 1803, daughter of merchant Isaac Solly of Leyton, Essex. She first married William Speir, a physician, and they lived in Calcutta. She wrote a scholarly book titled Ancient India which was published in 1856. As a widow, she married James Manning, a widowed lawyer, on 3 December 1857. Her second husband's daughters were Charlotte and Adelaide Manning. Her niece was Caroline Bishop who was an advocate for Kindergarten education.

== Kensington Society ==
In 1863, Manning helped found the Ladies' London Emancipation Society led by the philanthropist Clementia Taylor. Other founder members and executive committee members included Mary Estlin, Sarah Parker Remond, Harriet Martineau, Eliza Wigham and another women's college founder Elizabeth Malleson. The Kensington Society was formed in 1865 and this gathered together intelligent women known to the secretary Emily Davies for their "thoughtfulness". This discussion group met at Manning's house, 44 Phillimore Gardens, and she was the president of the society from its formation to its dissolution in 1868. The group attracted many notable women, particularly those associated with the improvement in women's access to higher education in Britain.

The Kensington Society charged the substantial sum of two shillings and sixpence annually and the same sum for each meeting. Manning's house was used because it could accommodate the number of women who attended. Some of the women were confident speakers, whereas others used the society as the only place where they could discuss a wide range of subjects privately. The opinions expressed at the meetings were not recorded but the subjects chosen included the obedience of daughters, whether boys and girls should be taught the same subjects and whether women could aspire to be members of parliament or magistrates should they ever be given the vote.

== Last years ==
In 1869, Manning published Ancient and Medieval India which was a major revision of her previous book. Manning was the first Mistress of Girton College in October of that year. She was succeeded the following January by Emily Shirreff.

Manning died in Westminster on 1 April 1871. The month before she died she started the London branch of the National Indian Association. This was an organisation that became very important to her stepdaughter, Adelaide.
