= Theodore Leighton Pennell =

English missionary (1867–1912)

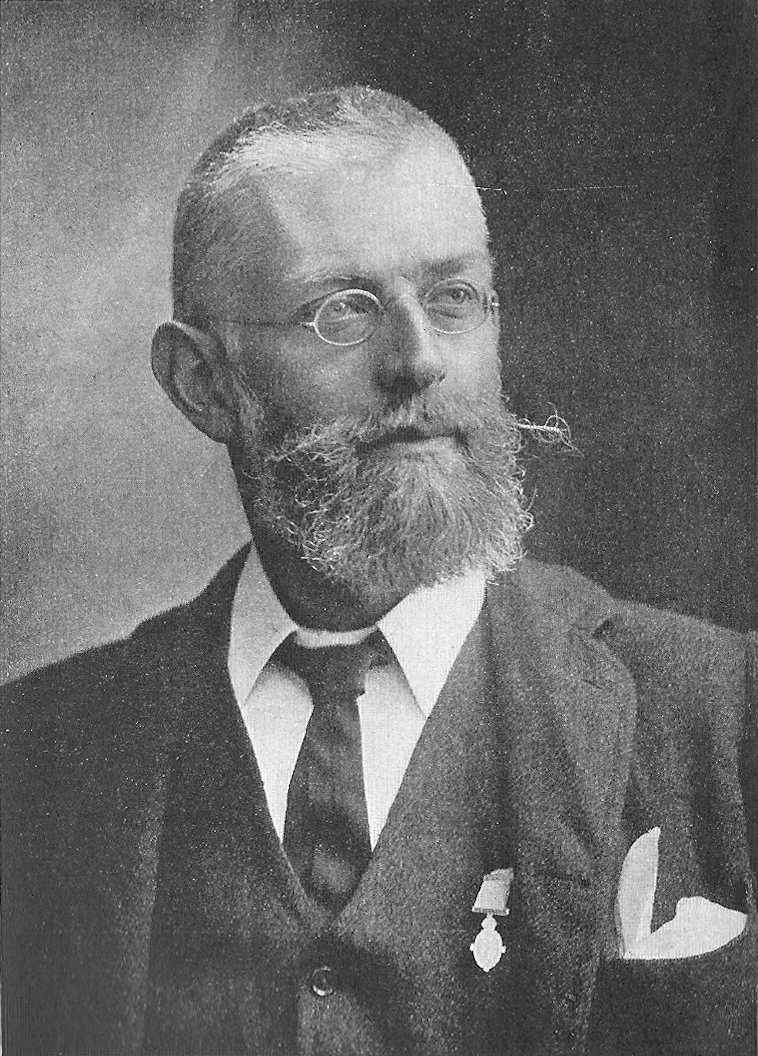
Theodore Leighton Pennell

Theodore Leighton Pennell (1867 – 21 March 1912), was an English Protestant missionary and doctor who lived among the tribes of Afghanistan. He founded Pennell High School and a missionary hospital in Bannu in the North-West Frontier of British India, now Pakistan. For his work, he received the Kaisar-i-Hind Medal for public service in India. He published a work on his life under the title Among the wild tribes of the Afghan frontier in 1908. Pennell House at Eastbourne College was named after him.

== Early years and 1890s ==
Born in England in 1867, Theodore Pennell was educated at Eastbourne College and qualified as a doctor (MB, MRCS, LRCP) in 1890, completing his MD and FRCS in 1891. He offered his services to the Church Missionary Society (CMS) in 1890. His father had died during his childhood, so he developed a very close relationship with his mother. When CMS sent Pennell to India, his mother decided to go too, and they both began learning Urdu. They reached Karachi in 1892 and went to Dera Ismail Khan, where Pennell began medical work. He often traveled around the villages, wearing Pathan dress and living with the people. He made his first visit to Tank in 1893 and established relationships with the Masud and Wazir tribes.

In October 1893, he moved to Bannu to present the gospel to travelers to and from Afghanistan. He was fluent in Urdu and Pushtu by then. He combined medical work with public preaching in Pushtu and selling Christian literature in Bannu and the surrounding villages, accompanied by the first Christian in Bannu, Jahan Khan. The mullahs strongly opposed his work, warning people not to accept his medicine. The mullahs tried to drive people away by telling them that the medicines contained alcohol and pig's blood, and would turn them forcibly into Christians. They also said that if the people were fated to die, then it would be better to die as believers.

Pennell built a small hospital at Bannu with his mother's money. In 1895, he opened a mission boarding school. Several Muslim inquirers showed an interest in baptism, but faced great opposition from relatives and other Muslims. Among his converts were Tayib Khan and Sayyid Badshah. Sayyid Badshah was shot dead soon after making his profession of faith. In 1896, Pennell was invited to visit the bandit Chakki. Pennell shared the gospel with him to such an effect that soon afterwards Chakki left his banditry; he wrote to Pennell: "I constantly meditate on your words and I have given up killing and robbery."

In 1897, Pennell bought a printing press from Lahore and began publishing a newspaper. There was fighting between the British and the Wazirs, but Pennell refused to have an armed guard. "Our best defence is our loving relationship with the tribes," he said. "Rifles and other weapons cannot protect us." In 1898, Pennell passed his Persian exams and began studying Arabic. He preached regularly in Bannu bazaar, despite opposition. Once an Afghan bit his finger, but in court Pennell still pleaded for the Afghan's release. Later, three Afghans became Christians.

== Twentieth century ==
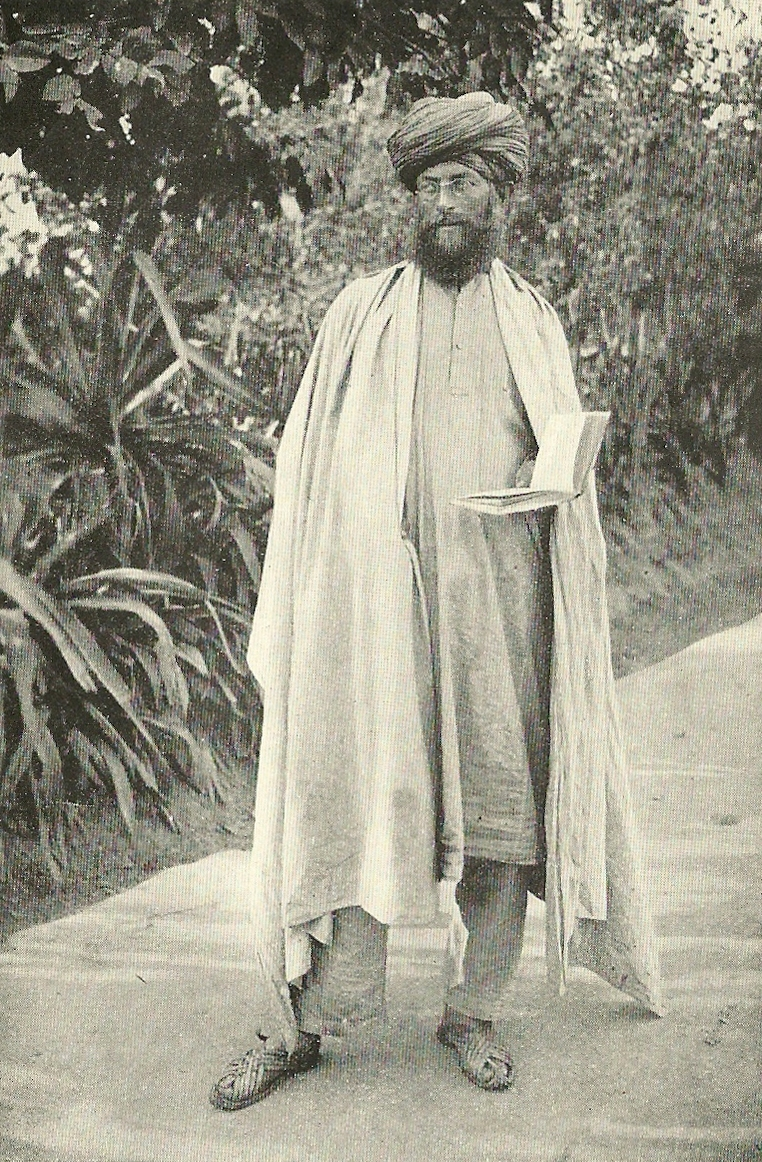
Pennell travelling as a pilgrim

In 1901, Pennell began learning Punjabi. In 1903, his disciple, Jahan Khan, went as the first Afghan foreign missionary to the Gulf and East Africa (Mombasa). In 1904, Pennell traveled through the Punjab by bicycle, mixing with the local people, with one Afghan companion. He dressed as a sadhu and was often penniless. He was amazed at the missionaries’ bungalows, more like forts than houses, separating them from the local people, where they sat waiting for inquirers to come to them rather than going out to sit with the people. He was disappointed at the low level of conduct of most Chuhra and Chamar (Untouchable) Christians who had been baptised without adequate instruction.

As I travelled, I sometimes rejoiced and sometimes was saddened. I rejoiced that in almost every village and bustee I would meet a Christian, and was saddened that so many of them did not smell like Christians. The missions have the custom of baptising Chuhras and Chamars, and changing their names without examining them, with the result that their misdoings are a blot on the Christian religion.

Pennell was also afraid that concentrating on the Chuhras would deter high-caste Hindus and Muslims from coming to Christ. He felt that pressure to produce results in terms of numbers of baptismal candidates was leading to superficial evangelism and slipshod practices, although he acknowledged that many of the Chuhra Christians were worthy spiritual leaders. He was afraid that many so-called Christian workers were "rice Christians", working for the mission for money alone.

In 1908, Pennell became very ill and returned to England for the first time in 16 years. While there, his mother died. On his return to India, he got engaged and married to a Parsee doctor, Alice Sorabji in 1908. They had a son.

== Illnesses and death ==
In 1909, Pennell was again seriously ill in Bannu, and on his recovery, he was showered with flowers and congratulations by the local people.

On 15 March 1912, Pennell's colleague Dr. William Hal Barnett fell ill with sepsis. (Note: Pennell and Barnett had recently treated a local man with a compound skull fracture that had become septic.) On 17 March, Pennell operated on Barnett, successfully—albeit temporarily—relieving Barnett's pain. By midday of the 19th, it was clear that Pennell had also contracted the infection. On 20 March, Barnett died. Pennell died in the early morning hours of 21 March, at the age of forty-four.

== Books and articles by or about Theodore Leighton Pennell ==
- Pennell, T. L. (1909). Among the Wild Tribes of the Afghan Frontier: A Record of Sixteen Years Close Intercourse with the Natives of the Indian Marches. London: Seeley, Service & Co., Ltd.
- Pennell, T. L. (1914). Things Seen in Northern India. London: Seeley, Service & Co.
- Pennell, Alice (1914). Pennell of the Afghan Frontier; The Life of Theodore Leighton Pennell, M.D., B.Sc., F.R.C.S. London: Seeley, Service & Co., Ltd.
- Harris, Nigel (2015). "6, Rio and the Afghan Frontier". Footnotes to History: The Personal Realm of John Wilson Croker, Secretary to the Admiralty (1809–1830), a "Group Family". Brighton & Eastbourne: Sussex Academic Press. ISBN 978-1-84519-746-9.
