= Caroline Bishop (kindergarten) =

English advocate for kindergartens (1846–1929)

- Born: Caroline Garrison Bishop; 18 October 1846; Heavitree, England
- Died: 12 December 1929 (aged 83); Boxmoor, England
- Known for: Advocacy of kindergartens
- Relatives: Charlotte Manning (aunt); Isaac Solly (grandfather)

Caroline Garrison Bishop (18 October 1846 – 12 December 1929) was an English advocate for kindergartens. She co-ordinated the introduction of these ideas in London and later opened a college in Birmingham.

== Life ==
Bishop was born in Heavitree in 1846 to the Unitarian Reverend Francis Bishop and his first wife Lavinia (born Solly). She was given the middle name of Garrison after William Lloyd Garrison who was a radical American abolitionist. She was born the same year as her father was host to Garrison when he visited Britain.

Her aunt was Charlotte Manning and her maternal grandfather was Isaac Solly. She was given the care of her stepbrother and stepsister after her mother died and her father remarried.

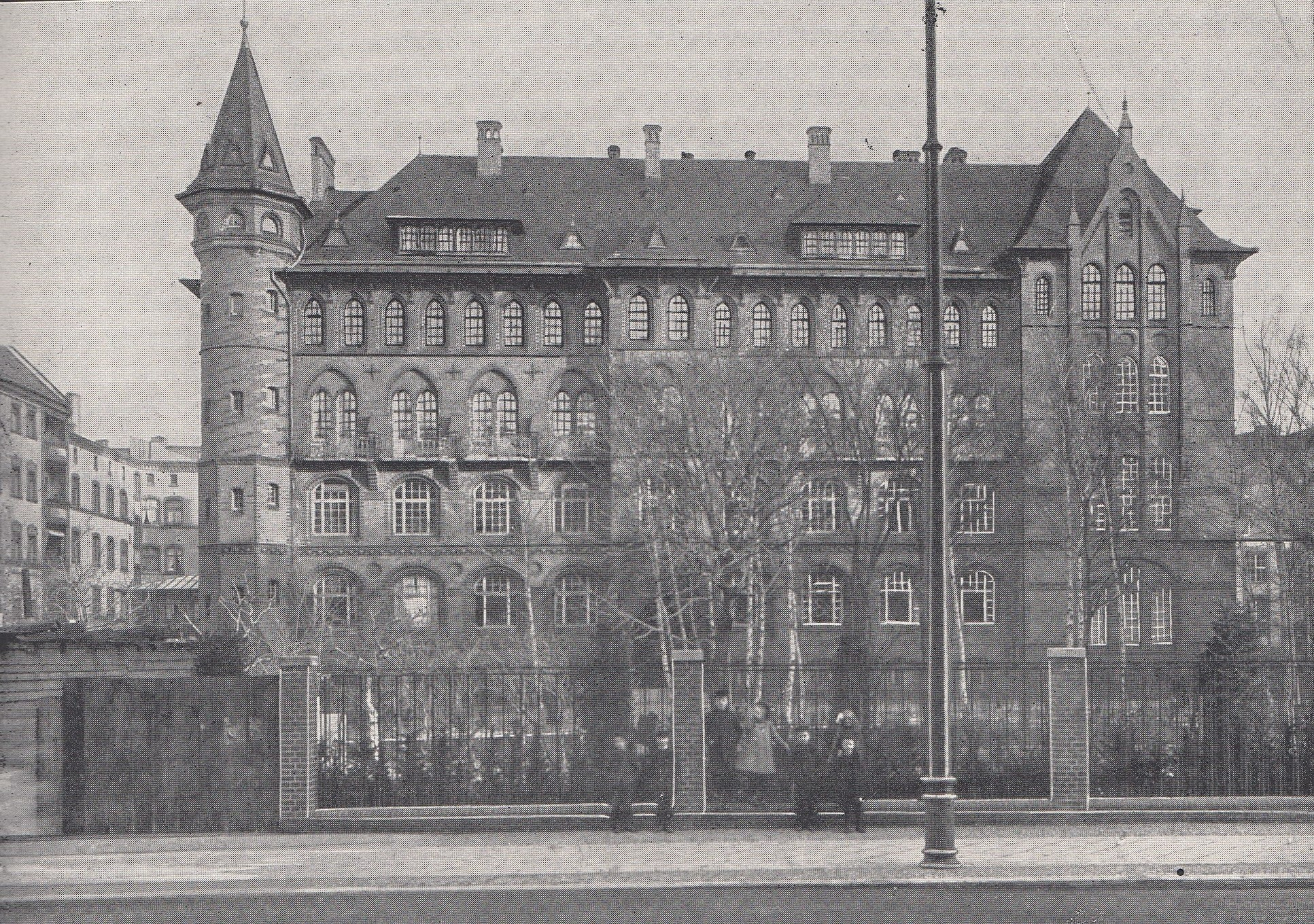
The Pestalozzi-Fröbel-Haus

Bishop was schooled in Germany for two years and then at Knutsford before she came to London to study. Here she became acquainted with ideas that would shape her life as she heard of the work of Froebel.

Bishop had been a pupil at the kindergarten some years after it was started by Bertha Ronge in Tavistock Place in St. Pancras. Kindergarten-based education became of great interest and in 1873 Bishop was employed at £100 per year to establish a twelve-week course in Kindergarten "exercises". Less than half of the first 200 trainees passed the course and it was agreed to train only senior staff. By the time she left in 1877, every London infant school was expected to have a teacher trained in kindergarten techniques, as the board employed inspectors to discover schools that had not introduced these ideas.

Joseph Payne and Bishop have been credited with founding the Froebel Society. Bishop introduced her cousin Adelaide Manning to the Froebel Society and Adelaide later became the society's treasurer and honorary secretary. Bishop went to Berlin in 1881 and she was replaced by Penelope Lawrence. Bishop was trained at the Pestalozzi-Fröbel house. The house had been started by Henriette Schrader-Breymann, who emphasized "learning by doing", the kindergarten value of play, using nature as a theme and normal domestic tasks. Two years later, she returned to England. Bishop's expertise was recognised when she was contacted and asked to return in 1883 to be the director of the Pestalozzi-Froebel House. The appointment was temporary, as Bishop was just providing holiday cover. Bishop moved to Edgbaston where she established a Froebel College and kindergarten. She would show trainee teachers how small children could learn from light tasks. These children would tidy the room and prepare the vegetables for dinner before playing with sand in the garden or other ways of "learning by doing" using music, poetry, or games.

== Birmingham's first nursery school ==
The Greet Free Kindergarten was in a poor area of Birmingham which was then named Greet. The kindergarten was in a room supplied by Geraldine Cadbury behind a Quaker meeting house; it opened in 1904 using staff from Bishop's college in Edgbaston. This was the first nursery school in Birmingham. It was formed on the initiative of Julia Lloyd, of the Quaker ironmaster family. Lloyd had studied in Germany at the Pestalozzi-Froebel Haus and then returned to work with Caroline Bishop. The children grew their own vegetables, visited farms, and used their own hands to complete the whole process that turned their fleece from their pet lamb into knitted garments for their dollhouses. After World War I, the kindergarten was renamed a nursery school.

Bishop retired and moved to Knighton in Leicester in 1906, where she continued to be involved with the welfare of children. She died in Boxmoor in 1929.

== Legacy ==
The Selly Oak Nursery School, which dates from the nursery school opened by Lloyd, Cadbury, and Bishop in 1904, is still in operation.
