= Pestalozzi-Fröbel Haus =

Pestalozzi-Fröbel-Haus, Germany

Coordinates: 52.490895°N 13.351444°E

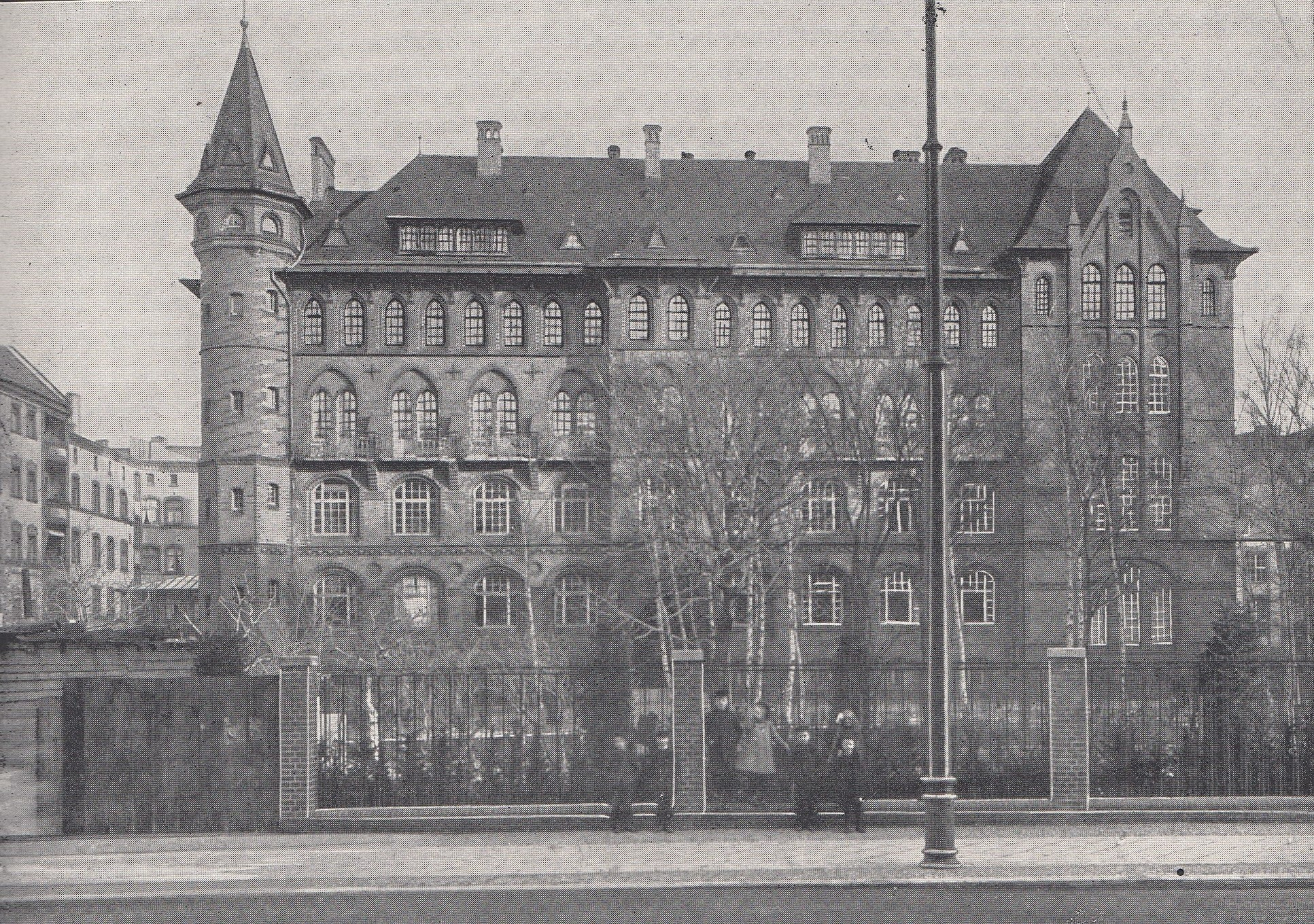
The Pestalozzi-Fröbel-Haus in c.1908

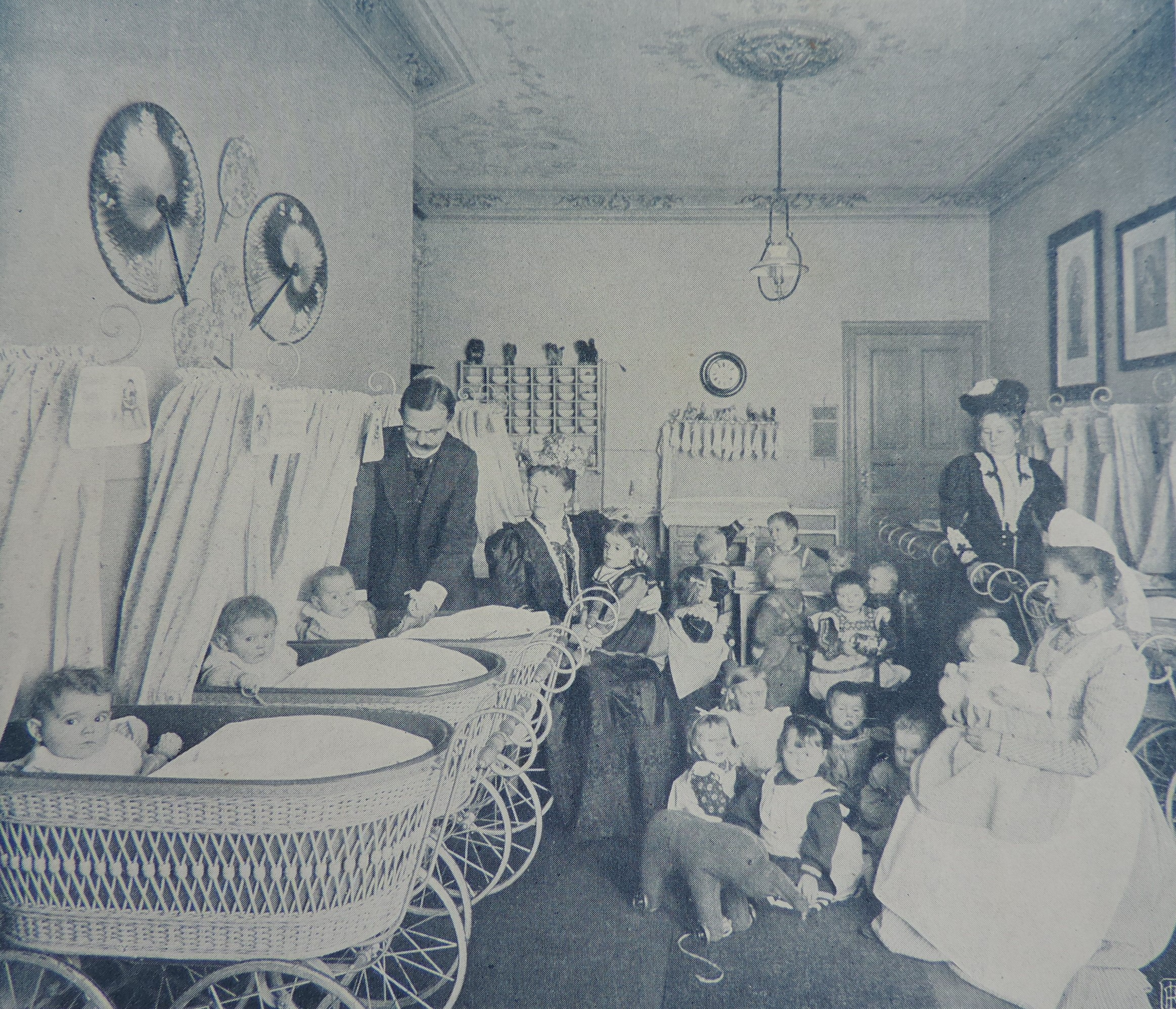
The creche in the house in 1907

The Pestalozzi-Fröbel-Haus was founded in 1882. It was one of the first institutions in Germany that started to train early childhood teachers, as well as one of the first where women could get professional training in Berlin. It believed in teaching children as individuals.

== History ==
The institution was established in 1882 by Henriette Schrader-Breymann. However, it was named after Friedrich Fröbel and another pedagogue, Johann Pestalozzi. Henriette Schrader-Breymann emphasized "learning by doing", the kindergarten value of play, using nature as a theme and normal domestic tasks. The first Swedish kindergarten teachers were trained by Schrader-Breymann at the Pestalozzi-Fröbel Haus, as was Mary Lyschinska.

Its influence in America began in 1880 when the American Journal of Education included a complimentary report. However, the German ideas complemented the growing influence of American approaches suggested by G. Stanley Hall and Kate Douglas Wiggin. Elizabeth Harrison of Chicago travelled to Berlin in 1889 to find out about the ideas she had seen practised by a German teacher. She used this trip to transform her nursery into the Chicago Kindergarten Training College.

The institution's influence spread to the United Kingdom when Caroline Bishop and Julia Lloyd both trained here. Lloyd was intermittently there from 1888 to 1896.

== Today ==
Today the organisation continues to train nursery school teachers.
