= Susie Sorabji =

Indian educator and Christian missionary

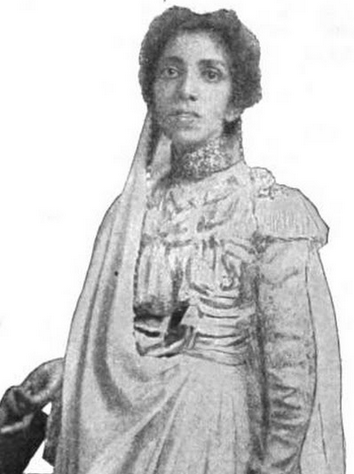
Susie Sorabji, from a 1905 publication.

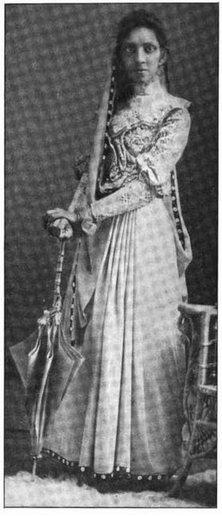
Susie Sorabji, from a 1901 publication.

Susie Sorabji (1868 – 15 March 1931) was an Indian educator and Christian missionary.

== Early life ==
Sorabji was born in Sholapur, Maharashtra, one of the seven daughters of Reverend Sorabji Karsedji, a Parsi Christian missionary, and Francina Ford, a convert from Hinduism who had been adopted and raised by a British couple. Her mother established several girls' schools at Pune. Susie Sorabji was educated at Bombay University. Sorabji's sisters included law pioneer Cornelia Sorabji and physician Alice Maude Sorabji Pennell.

== Career ==
Susie Sorabji followed her mother into educational work, and (despite lifelong frail health) traveled widely, attending international conferences, lecturing and meeting with potential donors, to raise awareness and funding for the girls' school in Pune. "I am pleading for my sisters, the gentlest, meekest, most neglected in the civilized world," she declared of her cause.

She started a kindergarten, and trained kindergarten teachers for work in other Indian schools. "I had to fight against the government inspector when I first started the kindergarten," she recalled, "but now the system has been made compulsory in the government schools." She also did literacy and missionary work among Indian women living in zenana spaces. She supported the temperance movement and Girl Guides of India, and, along with other members of her family, opposed the Indian independence movement and promoted support for the Empire and preserving the rule of the British Raj.

== Personal life ==
Susie Sorabji had chronic health issues, including vision problems which were treated with surgeries, medication, and extended periods of bandaging and rest. Sorabji died in 1931, aged 63 years. Her sister Cornelia Sorabji wrote a biographical memoir, Susie Sorabji, Christian-Parsee Educationist of Western India: A Memoir (London: Oxford University Press 1932). A street in Pune was named for Susie Sorabji in 1932.

There is a Susie Sorabji Auditorium at St. Helena High School in Pune, named in her memory. The school marks her death date (15 March) as its "Founder's Day", performing a play about her life and distributing food to local charity organizations.

There is a chapter of the Imperial Order Daughters of the Empire in Uxbridge, Ontario, named for Susie Sorabji.
