= Geraldine Forbes =

Professor in the department of History at State University of New York Oswego

Geraldine Hancock Forbes
- Born: Edmonton, Canada

Geraldine Hancock Forbes is a Canadian-born educator, writer, and Distinguished Teaching Professor Emerita, State University of New York Oswego.

== Biography ==
Geraldine Forbes earned her B.Ed. degree from the University of Alberta, and her master's degree and Ph.D. in history in 1972 from the University of Illinois Champaign-Urbana.

Forbes worked as a social studies teacher at Joseph Wolinsky Collegiate in Winnipeg, Manitoba, and Kings County High School, Nova Scotia, from 1963 to 1966. She joined the History Department, State University of New York Oswego, in 1971 as an assistant professor. She was promoted to associate professor in 1974; professor in 1981; and distinguished teaching professor in 1998. A pioneer in researching and writing women’s history in Colonial India, her publications include Women in Modern India; An Historian's Perspective: Indian Women and the Freedom Movement; Women in Colonial India: Essays on Politics, Medicine and Historiography; Lost Letters and Feminist History: the Political Friendship of Mohandas K. Gandhi and Sarala Devi Chaudhurani, and the edited memoirs of Shudha Mazumdar, Manmohini Zutshi Sahgal, and Haimabati Sen, as well as several articles and book chapters.

In 2008, she was appointed to the advisory committee of SPARROW: Sound and Picture Archives for Research on Women.

== Awards ==
Forbes's book Positivism in Bengal was awarded Rabindra Puraskar.

== Selected works ==
- Shudha Mazumdar: Memoirs of an Indian Woman(1989)
- Manmohini Zutshi Sahagal: An Indian Freedom Fighter recalls her life (1994)
- Women in Modern India (1996)
- Women in colonial India:Essays on Politics, Medicine and Historiography (2005) (Delhi: Chronicle Books)
- Because I am a Woman: Child Widow: A Memoir from Colonial India (2010)
