= Adelaide Manning =

British writer and editor

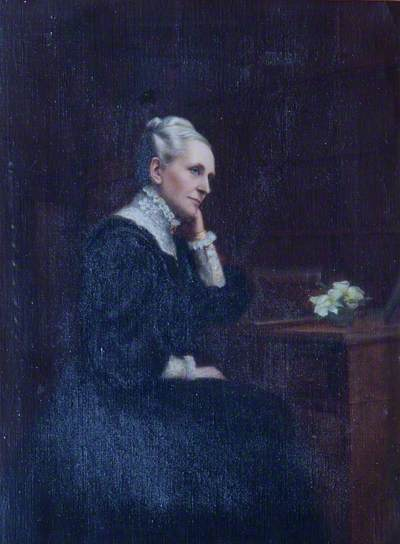
- portrait at Girton College
- Born: Elizabeth Adelaide Manning; 1828; Bloomsbury, London, England
- Died: 10 August 1905 (aged 76–77); Kensington, London
- Education: Bedford College and Girton College
- Parent(s): James Manning; Clarissa Palmer
- Relatives: Charlotte Manning (step-mother)

Elizabeth Adelaide Manning (1828 – 10 August 1905) was a British writer and editor. She championed kindergartens. She was one of the first students to attend Girton College. Manning was active for the National Indian Association which championed education and the needs of women in India.

== Early life ==
Elizabeth Adelaide Manning was born in 1828. Her mother was Clarissa (born Palmer) and her father was the lawyer James Manning, who helped the Law Amendment Society decide to support changing the law relating to married women's property.

== Career ==
Manning was a founder member of the London Froebel Society in 1874 with her cousin Caroline Bishop. Bishop was advising the London School Board on the use of Kindergarten methods and Manning presented a paper on the same subject to the Social Science Association. The following year the Froebel Society became national. She was one of the first students to attend Girton College after she sat the entrance exam. Her stepmother Charlotte Manning (née Solly) was briefly the first mistress.

In February 1871, Manning and her stepmother started the London branch of the National Indian Association. Her stepmother died the following month and Manning increasingly became the society's main proponent. She edited its magazine, whose title shifted from The Journal of the National Indian Association to The Indian Magazine in 1886, and then in 1891 The Indian Magazine and Review, still under Manning's leadership.

In 1882, the NIA launched Medical Women for India, an initiative to train women doctors so that they could work in part on caring for women in India. (See Zenana missions.) The NIA also took an interest in students from India who were studying in Britain. Manning created a book of guidance called Handbook of information relating to university and professional studies etc. for Indian students in the United Kingdom. Manning had an open house policy and she cared particularly for students from India. In 1888 Cornelia Sorabji contacted the NIA from India for assistance in completing university education. This letter was championed by Mary Hobhouse and Manning contributed funds, as did Florence Nightingale, Sir William Wedderburn and others. Sorabji arrived in England in 1889 and stayed with Manning. Sorabji was the first woman to complete a law degree at Oxford and she kept contact with the NIA during her career.

In July 1904, Manning was awarded the Kaisar-i-Hind Medal, first class, by the King for services to the British Raj.

Manning died in London in 1905.

== Legacy ==
Manning left bequests to the NIA, The Froebel Society, the Royal Free Hospital and Charles Voysey's unorthodox church in Piccadilly. She left her medal and two thousand pounds (£2,000) to Girton College. A portrait of her (from a photograph) was given by Emily Davies to Girton College, and Manning also gave the college a portrait of her stepmother. In 1911 Indian writer Sukumar Ray wrote home to his parents about the NIA, which he described as "'MissManning's Association".
