= Francina Sorabji =

Indian educator (1833–1910)

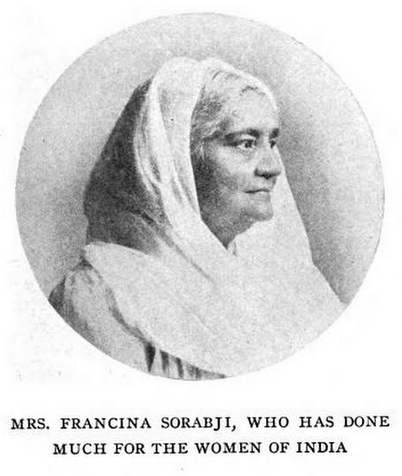
Francina Sorabji, from a 1905 publication.

Francina Ford Sorabji (née Santya; 1833 — October 24, 1910) was an Indian educator.

== Early life ==
Francina Santya was born to a family in southern India, and converted from Hinduism and lived with Christian missionaries as a young girl. She was adopted at age twelve by a British couple, Sir Francis Ford, Baronet, and his wife Cornelia Maria, Lady Ford (née Darling). Her adoptive mother's father was Sir Ralph Darling, the British army officer who became a controversial Governor of New South Wales.

== Career ==
Francina Sorabji founded the Victoria High School for girls at Poona, at first in her own home, and later in a separate stone building. The school was co-educational and enrolled all ages from young children to college-aged youth. At its peak Victoria High School counted a student body of 400. Her own daughters were among the first students. She founded two other schools in Poona: one with teaching in Marathi for Hindu children, and one with teaching in Urdu for Muslim children; these were run by her daughters Zuleika, Susie, and Lena. Another daughter, Mary Sorabji, taught at the High School for Indian Girls in Poona. She encouraged her students, and her seven daughters, into high education and professions, including law, medicine, and midwifery.

Francina Sorabji also ran a teacher-training program. She went to England to fundraise for her work in Poona in 1886, and testified before a British commission on education in India. She fostered orphans and welcomed widows and their children into her household. During an outbreak of plague in 1896, she helped to introduce preventive public health and sanitation practices in villages near Poona.

== Personal life ==
Francina Ford married Sorabji Karsedji, a Parsi Christian missionary, in 1853. Two of their children died in infancy; their seven surviving children included lawyer Cornelia Sorabji, educator Susie Sorabji, and medical doctor Alice Maude Sorabji Pennell. Francina Ford Sorabji was widowed in 1894, retired to Nashik in 1906, and died in 1910, aged 77 years. Philosopher Sir Richard Sorabji is her grandson.
