= Alice Cooper (teacher) =

British headmistress (1846–1917)

Alice Jane Cooper
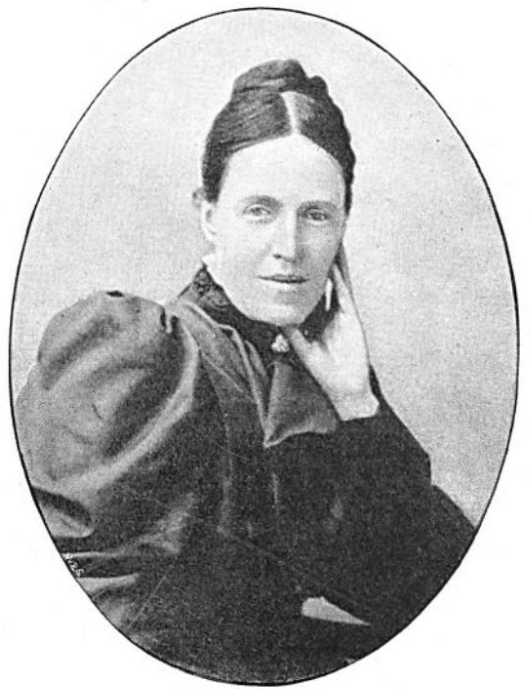
- Born: 4 August 1846; Doncaster
- Died: 17 June 1917 (aged 70); Beaconsfield
- Employer: Edgbaston High School for Girls
- Known for: Head mistress

Alice Cooper (4 August 1846 – 17 June 1917) was a British headmistress. She served as the inaugural headmistress at Edgbaston High School for Girls, the first girls' secondary school open to the public in Birmingham. Cooper encouraged the pursuit of cricket and science among her students. Subsequently, she dedicated her efforts to enhancing education and training secondary teachers in Oxford.

== Life ==
Cooper was born in Doncaster in 1846. She was the first daughter of the Reverend John Thomas Cooper and his wife Ann. She was a Unitarian like her parents and she took Cambridge higher exams and became second mistress at the Girls' Day School Trust's Notting Hill High School for Girls in 1875.

Cooper then assumed the role of the first headmistress at Edgbaston High School for Girls. The school, founded in 1876 by liberals that included Unitarians and Quakers, marked the first instance of a girls' secondary school open to the public in Birmingham.

Cooper strongly advocated for the teaching of science, sensible clothing, and physical exercise among her students. In 1881, the school organized a cricket match against another institution, which elicited a hostile reaction from a local newspaper. The newspaper published a cartoon and expressed its disapproval of the match, arguing that girls should be instructed in modesty rather than science or competition.

Cooper exchanged letters with Lewis Carroll (aka Charles Dodgson) and when the school arranged a performance of his play he agreed to attend. In his letter he said that he hoped to "kiss the Alice of the play" but this "should not be permitted on any account!".

Cooper resigned her position in 1895, but not to retire. Since 1891, she had been on the council of the emerging Somerville College. Cooper was to be the first female academic to be employed in Oxford where she gave private lessons to aspiring students who wished to teach in secondary schools.

Cooper died her home in Beaconsfield in 1917.
