= Alice Maude Sorabji Pennell =

Indian physician and writer (1874 –1951)

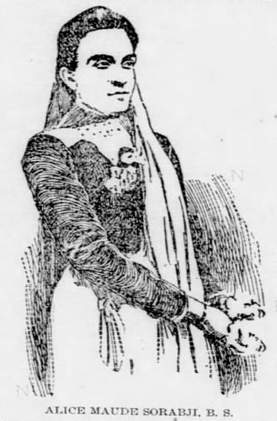
Alice Maude Sorabji, from an 1896 publication.

Alice Maude Sorabji Pennell OBE (July 17, 1874 – March 7, 1951) was an Indian physician and writer. She was the daughter and wife of Christian missionaries, and the first woman in India to earn a Bachelor of Science degree.

== Early life ==
Alice Maude Sorabji was born at Belgaum, the youngest daughter of Francina Sorabji and Reverend Sorabji Karsedji. Her mother was an educator and a Christian convert from polytheism of tribal extraction; her father was a Parsi Christian missionary. Her sisters included lawyer Cornelia Sorabji and educator Susie Sorabji.

Alice Sorabji attended her family's Victoria High School in Poona, and earned a Bachelor of Science degree at Wilson College in Bombay, the first woman to earn that degree in India. She was trained as a physician in London, with her older sister Cornelia's encouragement and efforts, completing her studies in 1905.

== Career ==
Alice Sorabji worked at the Zenana Hospital in Bahawalpur. For her work at the Pennell Hospital at Bannu (in present-day Pakistan), she was awarded the Kaisar-i-Hind Medal in 1917. She was also appointed an OBE in 1921, for her hospital work during World War I. She retired from medical work in 1925. She was named an Officer of the Order of Saint John of Jerusalem in 1943.

She wrote a biography of her husband, published soon after he died, and novels including Children of the Border (1925), The Begum's Son (1928), and Doorways of the East (1931). A fourth novel remained unpublished. She also worked on women's higher education in India. Later in life, she traveled and gave lectures on Indian women and health topics. "Absolutely fearless, she thinks nothing of taking an old Ford and proceeding, absolutely alone, into Afghanistan or up through the wilds of Persia," marveled a newspaper writer in 1930, when Alice Pennell was in her fifties, noting further that "she is the friend and confidante of women from all over India."

== Personal life ==
Alice Maude Sorabji married fellow physician Theodore Leighton Pennell in 1908. She was widowed when Pennell died in 1912, from septicaemia. They had a son. She died in 1951, aged 76 years, in Findon, Sussex.
