= National Indian Association =

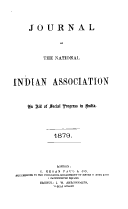
Journal of the National Indian Association in 1879

Should not be confused with the Indian National Association

The National Indian Association was formed in Bristol by Mary Carpenter. The London branch was formed the following year. After the death of Mary Carpenter, Elizabeth Adelaide Manning (E. A. Manning) became secretary and the organisation moved to London where its activities became synonymous with Manning.

== History ==
The National Indian Association in Aid of Social Progress in India was formed by Mary Carpenter in 1870 in Bristol. Its first objective was to improve education for Indian women. Carpenter had visited India in 1866 and she had written about her six months there. She was particularly concerned by the lack of female teachers to educate Hindu girls. The London branch of the association was formed the following year by Charlotte Manning and her step daughter Elizabeth Adelaide Manning. Cities in both the UK and India had local branches of the society.

From 1874 to her death in 1878 Princess Alice was President of the association, she was also the first to subscribe to the Indian Girls' Scholarship Fund, a fund set up by the Association to grant annual scholarships for Indian girls in government inspected schools.

In 1881 the society spawned an offshoot named the Northbrook Indian Society (NIA) after the Earl of Northbrook, ex-viceroy of India, who was the new society's Honorary President. The Northbrook society had been conceived two years before and in 1880 the new society was running a reading room stocked with both English and Indian newspapers. This society grew to also supply lodgings for visiting Indian students. In 1882 the NIA launched Medical Women for India which was an initiative to train female doctors so that they could work on assisting women in India. The NIA also took an interest in students from India who were studying in Britain. E. A. Manning created a book of guidance called Handbook of information relating to university and professional studies etc. for Indian students in the United Kingdom. Manning's help was not just theoretical, in 1888 Cornelia Sorabji wrote to the National Indian Association from India for assistance in completing her education. This was championed by Mary Hobhouse, and Manning contributed funds together with Florence Nightingale, Sir William Wedderburn and others. Sorabji arrived in England in 1889 and stayed with Manning and Hobhouse. Sorabji became the first woman to complete a law degree at Oxford and kept in contact with the NIA during her later career.

In 1904 E. A. Manning was awarded the Kaisar-i-Hind Medal by the King for services to the British Raj. She died the following year and Emma Josephine Beck was appointed as the new secretary. Beck was at an NIA event in 1909 where William Hutt Curzon Wyllie was assassinated by Madan Lal Dhingra.

In 1910 the society was at 21 Cromwell Street in South Kensington where it shared premises with the Northbrook Society and the Bureau for Information for Indian Students.

The association went into a decline in the 1920s but it did not formally end operations until 1966. The organisation had merged with the East India Association after India left the British Empire and it eventually became part of the Royal Society for India, Pakistan and Ceylon.
