= Edgbaston High School =

Edgbaston High School for Girls

Location
- Westbourne Road; Birmingham, West Midlands, B15 3TS; England; 52.4671°N 1.9274°W

Information
- Type: Private day
- Motto: Fideliter, Fortiter, Feliciter (Latin: "Faithfully, bravely, successfully"
- Established: 1876; 150 years ago
- Headmistress: Clare Macro
- Gender: Girls
- Age: 2 1/2 to 18
- Enrolment: c. 940
- Houses: St Patrick, St David, St George, St Andrew, St Francis
- Website: www.edgbastonhigh.co.uk

Edgbaston High School for Girls is a private day school for girls aged 2 to 18 in the Edgbaston area of Birmingham, England.

== History ==
In 1846, Elizabeth Brady founded a school in Edgbaston for the daughters of Quakers, which ran for 21 years.

This school was founded in 1876 making it the oldest girls' secondary school open to the public in Birmingham. The first headmistress was Alice Cooper. The school used to be a boarding school in a different location.

Cooper strongly encouraged the teaching of science and made sure that like other schools for girls they had science equipment. She encouraged her teachers to not teach by rote and she preferred to have no external examinations until the age of 17. She encouraged sensible clothing and physical exercise. In 1881, the school staged a cricket match against another school, to which a local newspaper reacted with hostility. It produced a cartoon and wrote a passage of its opinions towards the upcoming match.

In 1882, the school paid for her to visit a large number of American schools. She returned and reported on their better equipment and she saw some advantage in co-education.

== Academics ==
The school received the 11th best GCSE results and 9th best A/ AS level results in 2006 in Birmingham.

== Notable former pupils ==
- Mary Sturge, second woman doctor in Birmingham
- Verily Anderson, British television and play writer
- Sally Davies, medical doctor and first woman to be appointed as chief medical officer for England
- Molly Dineen, Canadian-born British documentary director, producer and cinematographer
- Elinor Wight Gardner, British university lecturer, geologist, and archaeologist
- Julia Lloyd, educationalist and pioneer of kindergartens
- Sue Lloyd, British model, television and film actress
- Helen George, television and film actress
- Kate Williams, historian, author and television presenter
- Malala Yousafzai, women's education activist and Nobel Peace Prize laureate
