= Blackheath High School =

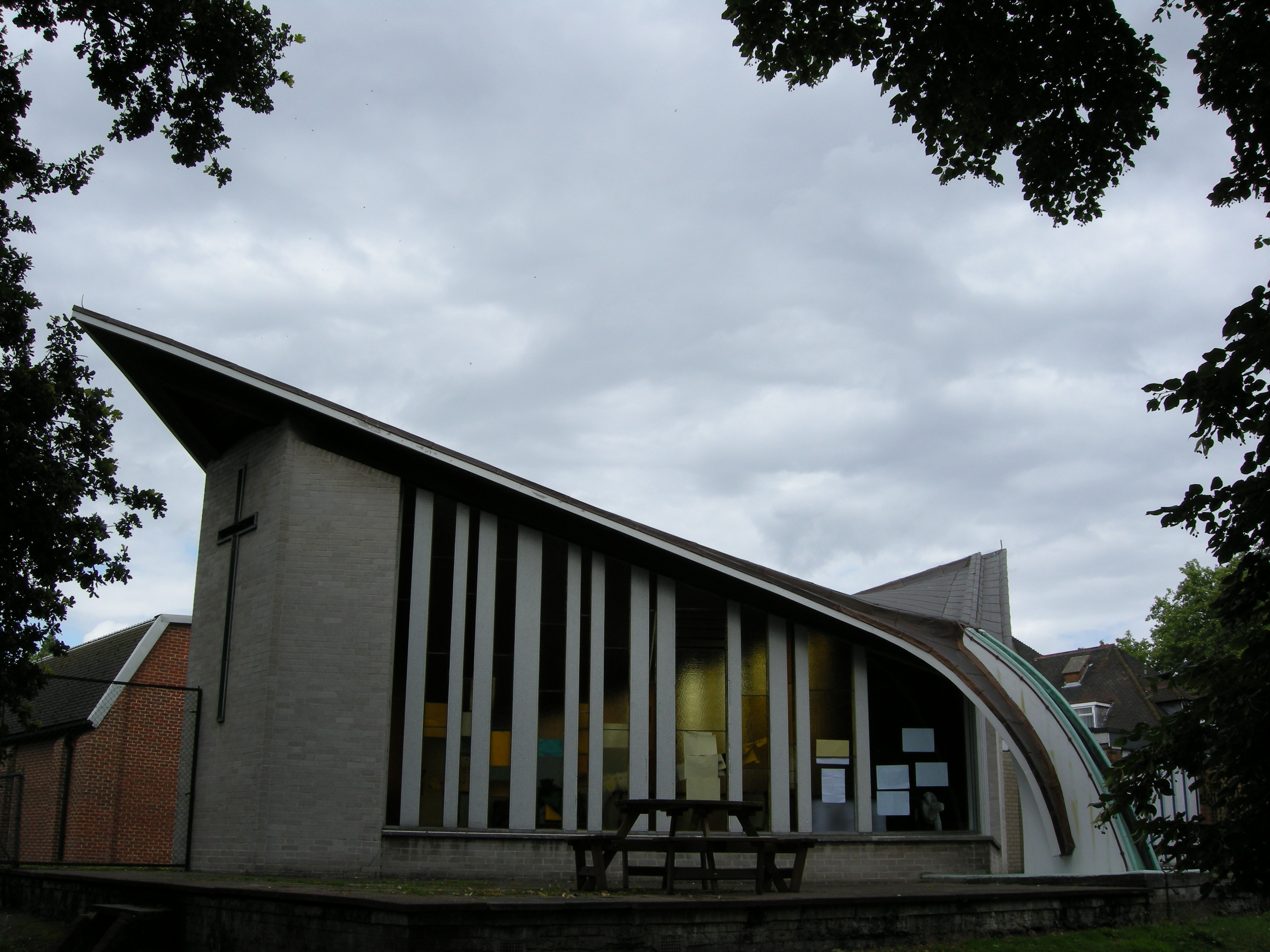

Location
- Vanbrugh Park; Blackheath, London, SE3 7AG; England; 51.4777°N 0.0155°E

Information
- Type: Private day school
- Motto: "Inspiration, curiosity, distinction"
- Established: 1880
- Founder: Princess Louise
- Local authority: Greenwich
- Department for Education URN: 100756 Tables
- Headmistress: Natalie Argile
- Gender: Female
- Age: 3 to 18
- Enrolment: 680~
- Website: http://www.blackheathhighschool.gdst.net/

Blackheath High School is a private day school for girls in Blackheath Village in southeast London, England. It was founded in 1880 as part of the Girls' Day School Trust; the Senior School occupied a purpose-built site in Wemyss Road for over 110 years.

== History ==
The school was set up in 1880 by the Girls' Public Day School Company. Sarah Allen Olney was the founding head. During her short leadership the school's roll grew by a factor of four. Olney resigned in 1886 to found a "more socially exclusive" school with her sister Rebecca.

Having established The Kingsley School, Florence Gadesden was moved by the GPDSC in 1886 from Leamington to Blackheath. The Times would later comment that her appointment was an act of "incalculable wisdom". The school then had 300 girls and Gadesden made a strong positive impression on many of them. She served as head for over thirty years and she retired in 1919. It was a state-funded direct grant grammar school from the late 1940s until 1976 when it became independent during the phasing out of direct grant schools.

== Location ==
The Senior Department (Years 7-13) is located in the former Church Army Wilson Carlile Training College (opened in 1965) in Vanbrugh Park after moving from the Wemyss Road site in Blackheath in 1993/4. The school building in Blackheath village then became the Junior department, for girls aged 3–11. The Vanburgh Park site includes the Church Army Chapel, a locally listed building (designed by architect Ernest Trevor Spashett) now used as a music room and dance studio.

== Notable former pupils ==
- Sophie Aldred, actress
- Isabel Appio, assistant music editor from 1986 to 1991 of Time Out
- Zeng Baosun, Chinese feminist, writer, and educator
- Prof Wendy Barclay, professor of influenza virology since 2007 at Imperial College London
- Phyllis Barclay-Smith CBE, ornithologist
- Lucy Boynton, actress
- The Reverend Prof Sarah Coakley (née Furber), theologian, Norris–Hulse Professor of Divinity since 2007 at the University of Cambridge
- Jean Cooke, artist
- Saffron Coomber, actress
- Dr Margery Davies, doctor, Guide International Service volunteer
- Evelyn Denington, Baroness Denington (née Bursill), chairman from 1966 to 1980 of Stevenage Development Corporation
- Prof Alison Finch, professor of French from 2000 to 2003 at the University of Oxford, and acting master of Churchill College, Cambridge in 2012
- Jessica Fellowes, author and journalist
- Margaret Jay, Baroness Jay of Paddington
- Prof Elizabeth Jeffreys, Bywater and Sotheby Professor of Byzantine and Modern Greek Language and Literature from 1996 to 2006 at the University of Oxford
- Deborah Lawrenson, novelist
- Helen Lederer, comedian
- Liv Little, founder of gal-dem
- Fiona Maddocks, wife of Tom Phillips, chief music critic from 1997 to 2002 and since 2008 of The Observer, and founding editor from 1992 to 1997 of BBC Music Magazine
- Hilary Miller, artist
- Margaret Popham CBE, principal from 1937 to 1953 of Cheltenham Ladies' College
- Mary Quant, fashion designer
- Prof Anne Stevens, professor of European studies from 1998 to 2008 at Aston University, and from 1991 to 1998 at the University of Kent
- Dora Turnbull (née Elles), wrote under the pen-name Patricia Wentworth
- Lesley Vickerage, actress
- Charlene White, journalist
- Beth Willis (producer)
- Diane Yeo, UK director from 2001 to 2003 of UNHCR, and director from 2003 to 2005 of the Muscular Dystrophy Campaign

== Published histories ==
- Malim, Mary Charlotte; Escreet, Henrietta Caroline (1927), The Book of Blackheath High School, Blackheath: Blackheath Press.
- Watts, K M (1980), A History of Blackheath High School, Impart.
- Allen, Dr Hillary (2005), Brief History of Blackheath High School GDST 1880–2005. Retrieved 21 May 2008.
