= Priscilla Young =

English social worker (1925–2006)

Priscilla Young CBE
- Born: Priscilla Helen Ferguson Young; 25 November 1925; Bath, Somerset, England
- Died: 8 January 2006 (aged 80); Leonard Stanley, Gloucestershire, England
- Citizenship: United Kingdom
- Education: The Kingsley School
- Alma mater: University of Edinburgh
- Occupation: Social worker
- Years active: 1947–2006
- Employers: Family Welfare Association; Central Council for Education and Training in Social Work
- Organization: University of Leicester

Priscilla Helen Ferguson Young CBE (25 November 1925 – 8 January 2006) was an English social worker. She was director of social work education at the Central Council for Education and Training in Social Work (CCETSW) from 1971 to 1986. Young also worked with the Family Welfare Association, before becoming the children's department of Somerset County Council and subsequently the deputy children's officer in Oxford. She was tutor-supervisor at the University of Leicester's School of Social Studies from 1961 to 1971.

== Early life and education ==
On 25 November 1925, Young was born at her grandmother's rectory in Bath, Somerset. She was the oldest child of the social worker, secretary and teacher Fergus Ferguson Young and his wife, the former Foreign Office worker Helen Frances Graham (née Murphy). Young had a young brother and relatives who were of English, Irish and Scottish descent. At age four, Young and her parents moved to Kenya, where her father taught in a rural area. She was isolated as a white child and was educated by her mother and examined by her father. The family returned to England in 1936. Young was educated at The Kingsley School, Leamington Spa, and studied for her Master of Arts degree at the University of Edinburgh, where she also did a social studies course.

== Career ==
Between 1947 and 1951, she worked with the Family Welfare Association in London. Young worked in Somerset in the children's department of its county council from 1951 to 1953 before moving to Oxford to become its deputy children's officer between 1953 and 1958. In 1958, she moved to the United States, and broaden her experience by working with the child and family services in Portland, Maine. She joined the University of Leicester as tutor-supervisor in child care in the School of Social Studies in 1961. She would be lecturer and then senior lecturer while at the university.

Young left the university in 1971 and was appointed director of social work education at the Central Council for Education and Training in Social Work (CCETSW). At the CCETSW, she established a framework within which social work education would be allowed to develop. Young introduced single social worker qualification and set two-year training courses. She responded to the 1964 Kilbrandon report and the 1966 Seebohm Report on local social services by setting up regional offices, expanded training to all day-care, field and residential staff and took on approved distribution of training support grants, social work examination and student grants. Throughout the years, Young oversaw the issues around the CCETSW's political aspects become more problematic and accusations during the 1980s that the council along with social work and training establishments were "institutionally racist".

She and her colleagues were required to either accept, adjust, reconcile or resist change as there became a vastly increased awareness of social worker's jobs in children's services, particularly in child protection. Young also oversaw trade unions resisting post-qualifying training and educational institutions disagreed with employers about courses contents and shapes. She retired to Bath in 1986. Between 1987 and 1993, Young chaired family service units and the South West Children in Need Committee. She was the Christian Council on Ageing's vice-chair and was a member of the Social Security Appeals Tribunal. At the local care centre, Young cooked meals and drove the housebound to places.

== Personal life ==
Young was religious. In 1977, she was made an honorary fellow of Sheffield Hallam University. In June 1982, Young was appointed CBE, for "services to social-work education". To mark her retirement, she received an honorary Doctor of Letters doctorate from the Ulster University in 1987. Young died of cerebrovascular disease in The Rectory, Leonard Stanley, Gloucestershire, on 8 January 2006. Her funeral took place in the local church.

== Personality and legacy ==
According to Olive Stevenson in the Oxford Dictionary of National Biography, Young "played an important role in establishing social work as a valuable and recognized profession." Stevenson noted Young "was least comfortable in adversarial situations, such as arose with trade unions or in relation to racial issues. She commented that 'one of the greatest stresses of the job was the diversity and levels of things that had to be dealt with'" The University of Edinburgh Department of Social Work holds a box collection of her correspondence and placement reports from 1946 to 1960, and the British Library holds tapes and transcripts of her career at the CCETSW.
