= Charles Kingsley =

English clergyman, historian and novelist (1819–1875)

The Reverend Charles Kingsley
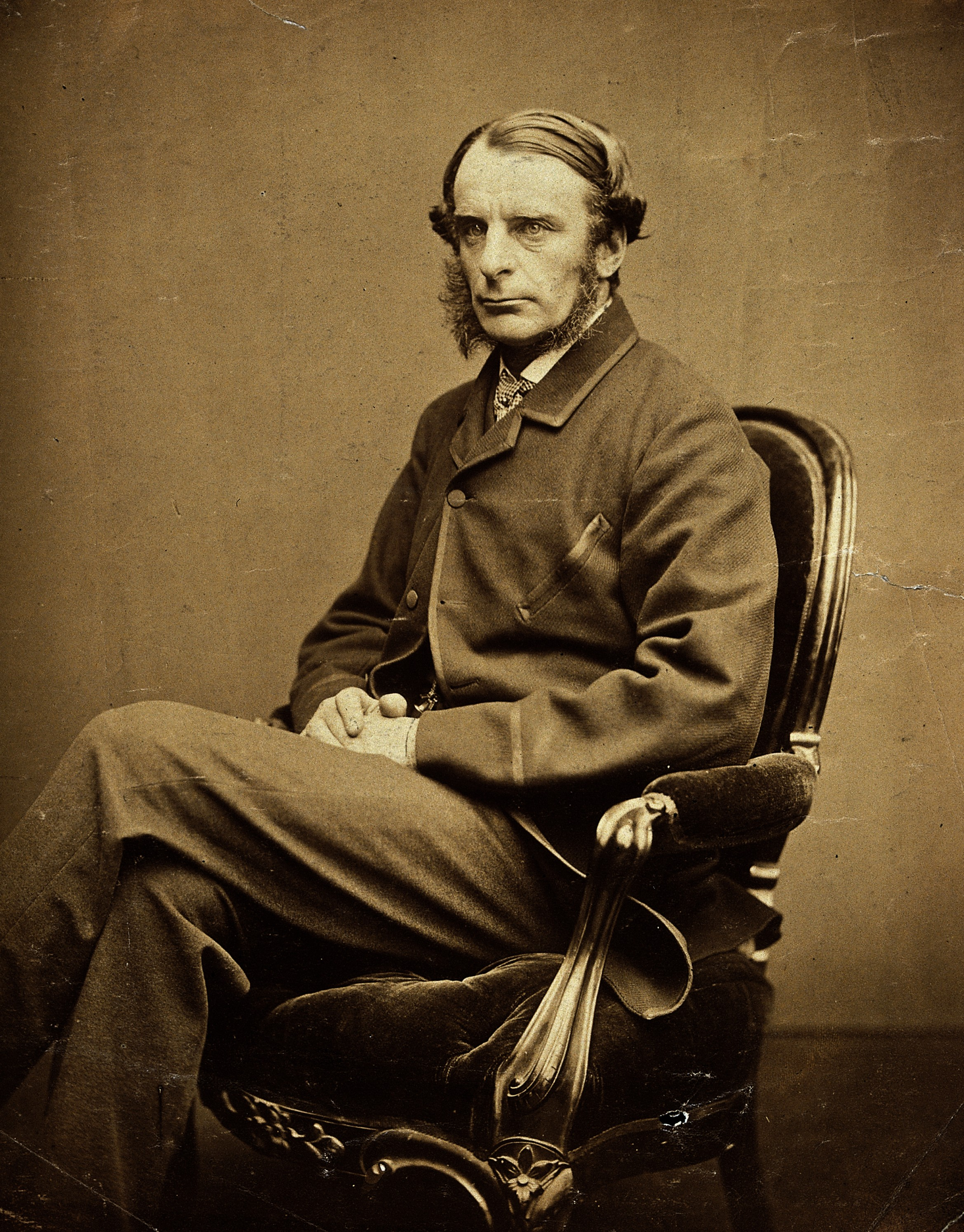
- Born: 12 June 1819; Holne, Devon, England
- Died: 23 January 1875 (aged 55); Eversley, Hampshire, England
- Education: King's College London; Magdalene College, Cambridge
- Occupations: Clergyman, historian, novelist
- Spouse: Frances Eliza (m. 1844)
- Writing career
- Period: 19th century
- Genre: Social Christianity
- Literary movement: Christian socialism

Charles Kingsley (12 June 1819 – 23 January 1875) was an English clergyman, social reformer, historian, novelist and poet. A broad church priest of the Church of England, he is particularly associated with Christian socialism, Anti-Catholicism, the working men's college, and forming labour cooperatives, which failed, but encouraged later working reforms. He is known for his novels Yeast (1848), Alton Locke (1850), Hypatia (1853), Westward Ho! (1855), The Water-Babies (1863), and Hereward the Wake (1866).

== Life and character ==
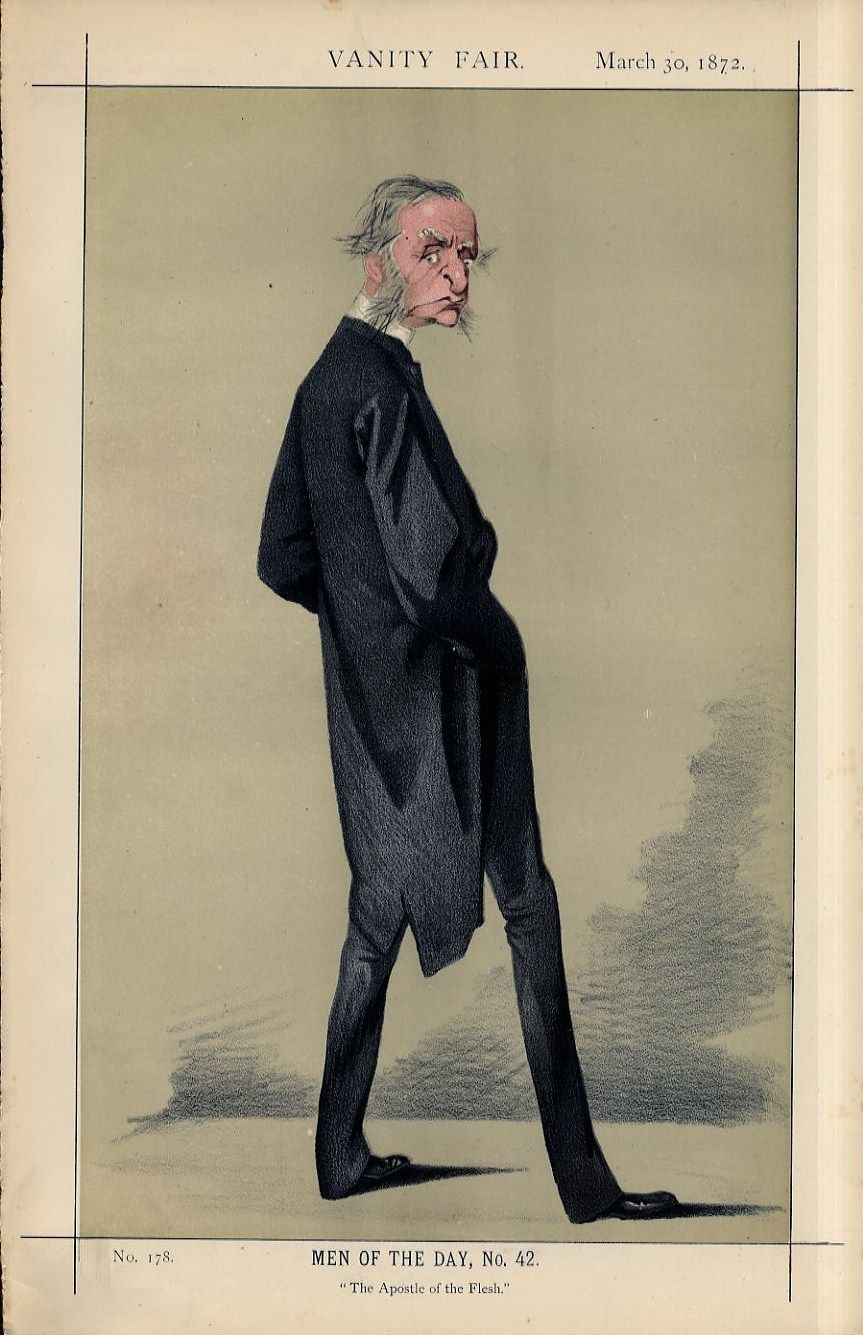
Caricature by Adriano Cecioni published in Vanity Fair in 1872.

Kingsley was born in Holne, Devon, the elder son of the Reverend Charles Kingsley and his wife, Mary Lucas Kingsley. His brother, Henry Kingsley (1830–1876), and sister, Charlotte Chanter (1828–1882), also became writers. He was the father of the novelist Lucas Malet (Mary St Leger Kingsley 1852–1931) and the uncle of the traveller and scientist Mary Kingsley (1862–1900).

Charles Kingsley's childhood was spent in Clovelly, Devon, where his father was curate in 1826–1832 and rector in 1832–1836, and at Barnack, Northamptonshire. He was educated at Bristol Grammar School and Helston Grammar School before studying at King's College London and the University of Cambridge. Charles entered Magdalene College, Cambridge, in 1838, and graduated first class in classics, and senior optime in 1842. He chose to pursue priesthood in the Anglican Church. In 1844, he became Rector of Eversley in Hampshire. In 1859, he was appointed chaplain to Queen Victoria. In 1860, he became Regius Professor of Modern History at the University of Cambridge, and, in 1861, a private tutor to the Prince of Wales.

In 1869 Kingsley resigned his Cambridge professorship and served from 1870 to 1873 as a canon of Chester Cathedral. While there, he founded the Chester Society for Natural Science, Literature and Art, which was prominent in the establishment of the Grosvenor Museum. In 1872, he agreed to become the 19th president of the Birmingham and Midland Institute. In 1873, he was made a canon of Westminster Abbey.

Kingsley sat on the 1866 Edward Eyre Defence Committee along with Thomas Carlyle, John Ruskin, Charles Dickens, John Tyndall, and Alfred Tennyson, where he supported Jamaican Governor Edward Eyre's brutal suppression of the Morant Bay Rebellion against the Jamaica Committee. Kingsley was a friend and colleague of Charles Darwin.

One of his daughters, Mary St Leger Kingsley, became known as a novelist under the pseudonym Lucas Malet. Kingsley's biography, written by his widow in 1877, was entitled, Charles Kingsley, his Letters and Memories of his Life.

Kingsley received letters from Thomas Huxley in 1860, and sent letters in 1863 discussing Huxley's early ideas on agnosticism.

== Death ==
Charles Kingsley died of pneumonia on 23 January 1875 at Eversley, Hampshire, aged 55. He was buried there in St. Mary's Churchyard.

== Influences and works ==
Kingsley's interest in history is shown in several of his writings, including The Heroes (1856), a children's book about Greek mythology, and several historical novels, of which the best known are Hypatia (1853), Hereward the Wake (1865) and Westward Ho! (1855). From his book The Heroes the story of Perseus, the Gorgon Slayer was taken and in 1898 republished as The Story of Perseus and the Gorgon's Head.

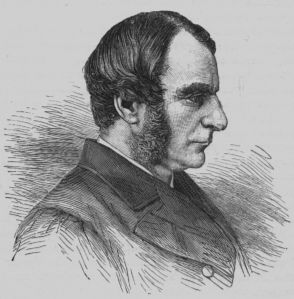
Kingsley

He was sympathetic to the idea of evolution and was one of the first to welcome Charles Darwin's book On the Origin of Species. He had been sent an advance review copy and in his response of 18 November 1859 (four days before the book went on sale) stated that he had "long since, from watching the crossing of domesticated animals and plants, learnt to disbelieve the dogma of the permanence of species." Darwin added an edited version of Kingsley's closing remarks to the next edition of his book, stating, "A celebrated author and divine has written to me that 'he has gradually learnt to see that it is just as noble a conception of the Deity to believe that He created a few original forms capable of self-development into other and needful forms, as to believe that He required a fresh act of creation to supply the voids caused by the action of His laws.'" When a heated dispute lasting three years developed over human evolution, Kingsley gently satirised the debate, known as the Great Hippocampus Question.

Kingsley's concern for social reform is illustrated in his classic, The Water-Babies, A Fairy Tale for a Land Baby (1863), a tale about a boy chimney sweep initially written for his son Grenville Arthur, which retained its popularity well into the 20th century. The story mentions the main protagonists in the scientific debate over human origins, rearranging his earlier satire as the "great hippopotamus test". The book won a Lewis Carroll Shelf Award in 1963.

Kingsley's chief asset as a novelist lay in his descriptive faculties: the descriptions of South American scenery in Westward Ho!, of the Egyptian desert in Hypatia, and of the North Devon scenery in Two Years Ago. American scenery is vividly and truthfully described, in part stemming from his observations during a lecture tour of the United States that he undertook in 1874 and reported to his wife, Francis Eliza Grenfell Kingsley. The letters were later published. He also published his work At Last, written after he had visited the tropics. His sympathy with children taught him how to gain their interest. His version of the old Greek stories entitled The Heroes, and Water-babies and Madam How and Lady Why, in which he deals with popular natural history, take high rank among books for children. Kingsley was influenced by Frederick Denison Maurice, and was close to many Victorian thinkers and writers, including the Scottish writer George MacDonald.

Kingsley was highly critical of Roman Catholicism and his argument in print with John Henry Newman, accusing him of untruthfulness and deceit, prompted the latter to write his Apologia Pro Vita Sua. Kingsley also wrote poetry and political articles, as well as several volumes of sermons.

Kingsley coined the term pteridomania (meaning "a craze for ferns") in his 1855 book Glaucus, or the Wonders of the Shore.

== Racial views ==
=== Anglo-Saxonism ===
Kingsley was a fervent Anglo-Saxonist, and was seen as a major proponent of the ideology, particularly in the 1840s. He proposed that the English people were "essentially a Teutonic race, blood-kin to the Germans, Dutch, Scandinavians". Kingsley suggested there was a "strong Norse element in Teutonism and Anglo-Saxonism".

Mixing mythology and Christianity, he blended Protestantism as it was practised at the time with the Old Norse religion, saying that the Church of England was "wonderfully and mysteriously fitted for the souls of a free Norse-Saxon race". He believed the ancestors of Anglo-Saxons, Norse and Germanic peoples had physically fought beside the god Odin, and that the British monarchy was genetically descended from the god.

=== Dislike of the Irish ===
Kingsley has been accused of intensely antagonistic views of the Irish, whom he described in derogatory terms.

Visiting County Sligo in Ireland, he wrote a letter to his wife from Markree Castle in 1860: "I am haunted by the human chimpanzees I saw along that hundred miles of horrible country [Ireland]... [for] to see white chimpanzees is dreadful; if they were black, one would not see it so much, but their skins, except where tanned by exposure, are as white as ours."

== Legacy ==
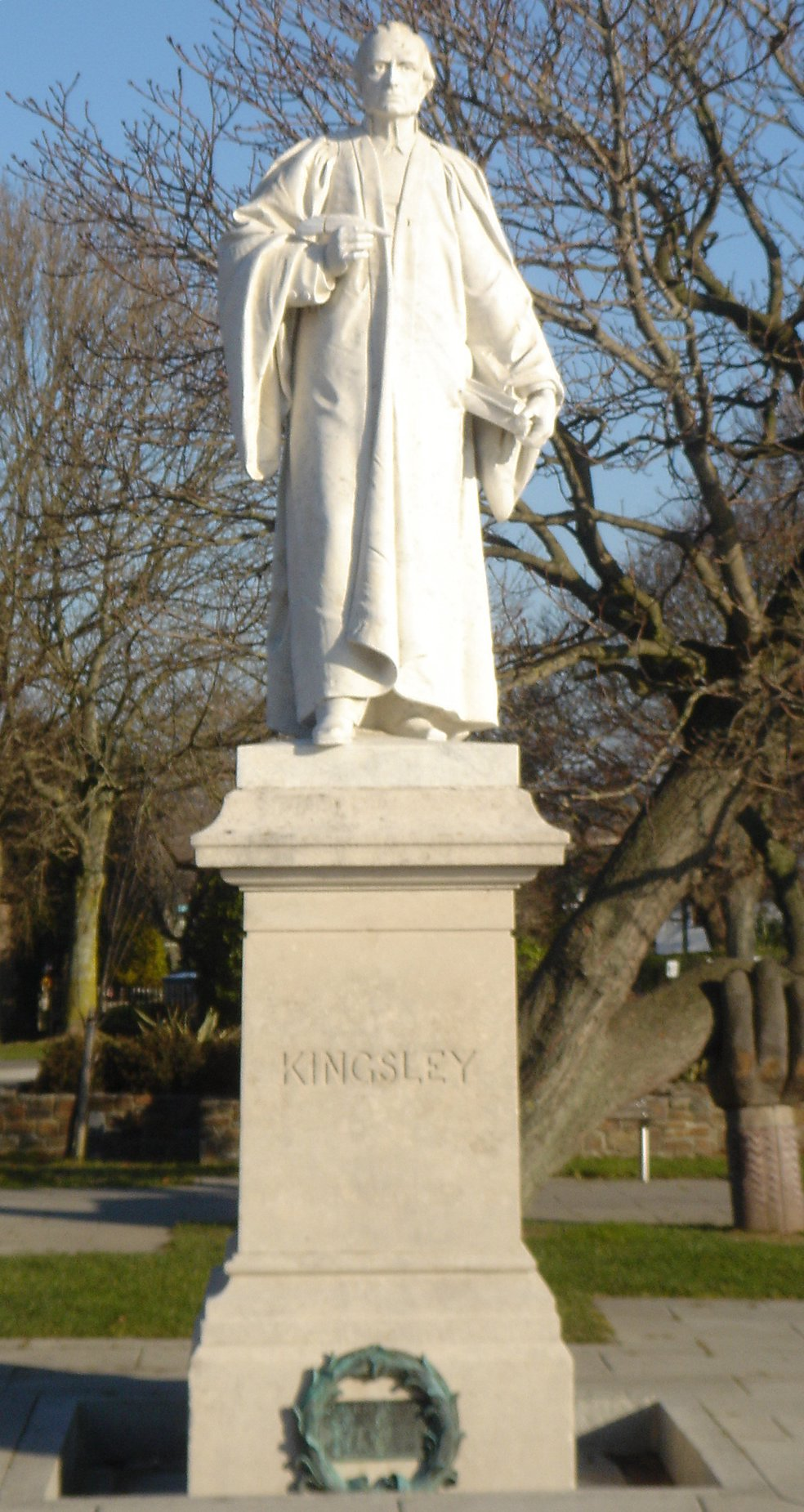
A statue of Charles Kingsley at Bideford, Devon (UK)

Charles Kingsley's novel Westward Ho! led to the founding of a village by the same name (the only place name in England with an exclamation mark) and inspired the construction of the Bideford, Westward Ho! and Appledore Railway. A hotel in Westward Ho! was named after and opened by him. A hotel which was opened in 1897 in Bloomsbury, London, and named after Kingsley was founded by teetotallers, who admired Kingsley for his political views and his ideas on social reform. It still exists as The Kingsley by Thistle.

Kingsley School, a private school in Bideford, the town in which Westward Ho! is set, took its name from him after it was founded in 2009 as a merger of Edgehill College and Grenville College.

In 1905, the composer Cyril Rootham wrote a musical setting of Kingsley's poem Andromeda. This was performed at the Bristol Music Festival in 1908. Like Kingsley, Rootham had been educated at Bristol Grammar School.

== Published works ==
- Yeast, a novel (1848)
- Saint's Tragedy (1848), a drama
- Alton Locke, a novel (1849)
- Twenty-five Village Sermons (1849)
- Cheap Clothes and Nasty (1850)
- Three Fishers (1851)
- Phaeton, or Loose Thoughts for Loose Thinkers (1852)
- Sermons on National Subjects (1st series, 1852)
- Hypatia, a novel (1853)
- Glaucus, or the Wonders of the Shore (1855)
- Sermons on National Subjects (2nd series, 1854)
- Alexandria and her Schools (1854)
- Westward Ho!, a novel (1855)
- Sermons for the Times (1855)
- The Heroes, Greek fairy tales (1856)
- Two Years Ago, a novel (1857)
- Andromeda and other Poems (1858)
- The Good News of God, sermons (1859)
- Miscellanies (1859)
- Limits of Exact Science applied to History (Inaugural lectures, 1860)
- Town and Country Sermons (1861)
- Sermons on the Pentateuch (1863)
- The Water-Babies, A Fairy Tale for a Land Baby (1863)
- The Roman and the Teuton (1864)
- David and other Sermons (1866)
- Hereward the Wake: "Last of the English", a novel (London: Macmillan, 1866)
- The Ancient Régime (Lectures at the Royal Institution, 1867)
- Water of Life and other Sermons (1867)
- The Hermits (1869)
- Madam How and Lady Why (1869)
- At Last: a Christmas in the West Indies (1871)
- Town Geology (1872)
- Discipline and other Sermons (1872)
- Prose Idylls (1873)
- Plays and Puritans (1873)
- Health and Education (1874)
- Westminster Sermons (1874)
- Lectures delivered in America (1875)
- Charles Kingsley's American Notes: Letters From a Lecture Tour, 1874 (1958)
- Earl Haladan's Daughter (1858)

== Sources ==
- Darwin, Charles (1860), On the Origin of Species by Means of Natural Selection, or the Preservation of Favoured Races in the Struggle for Life, London: John Murray 2nd edition. Retrieved on 20 July 2007
- Darwin, Charles (1887), Darwin, F (ed.), The life and letters of Charles Darwin, including an autobiographical chapter, London: John Murray (The Autobiography of Charles Darwin) Retrieved on 20 July 2007
- Dawson, William James (1905). "Charles Kingsley". In Dawson, William James (ed.). The Makers of English Fiction. F. H. Revell Company.
- Kingsley, Charles (1877). Kingsley, Frances Eliza Grenfell (ed.). Charles Kingsley: His Letters and Memories of His Life. New York: Scribner, Armstrong. OCLC 247058589.
