= Charlotte Shaw =

Charlotte Shaw may refer to:

- Charlotte Payne-Townshend (1857–1943), Irish political activist in Britain, married to playwright George Bernard Shaw
- Death of Charlotte Shaw, British schoolgirl drowning in Dartmoor National Park in 2007
