= British School in the Netherlands =

British School in the Netherlands (BSN)
- The Hague; Netherlands

Information
- Type: Private, international school
- Established: 1931
- Chair: Louise Simpson
- Grades: F1–Sixth form
- Age range: 3–18
- Enrolment: 2100~
- Campus type: 4 suburban campuses
- Website: www.britishschool.nl

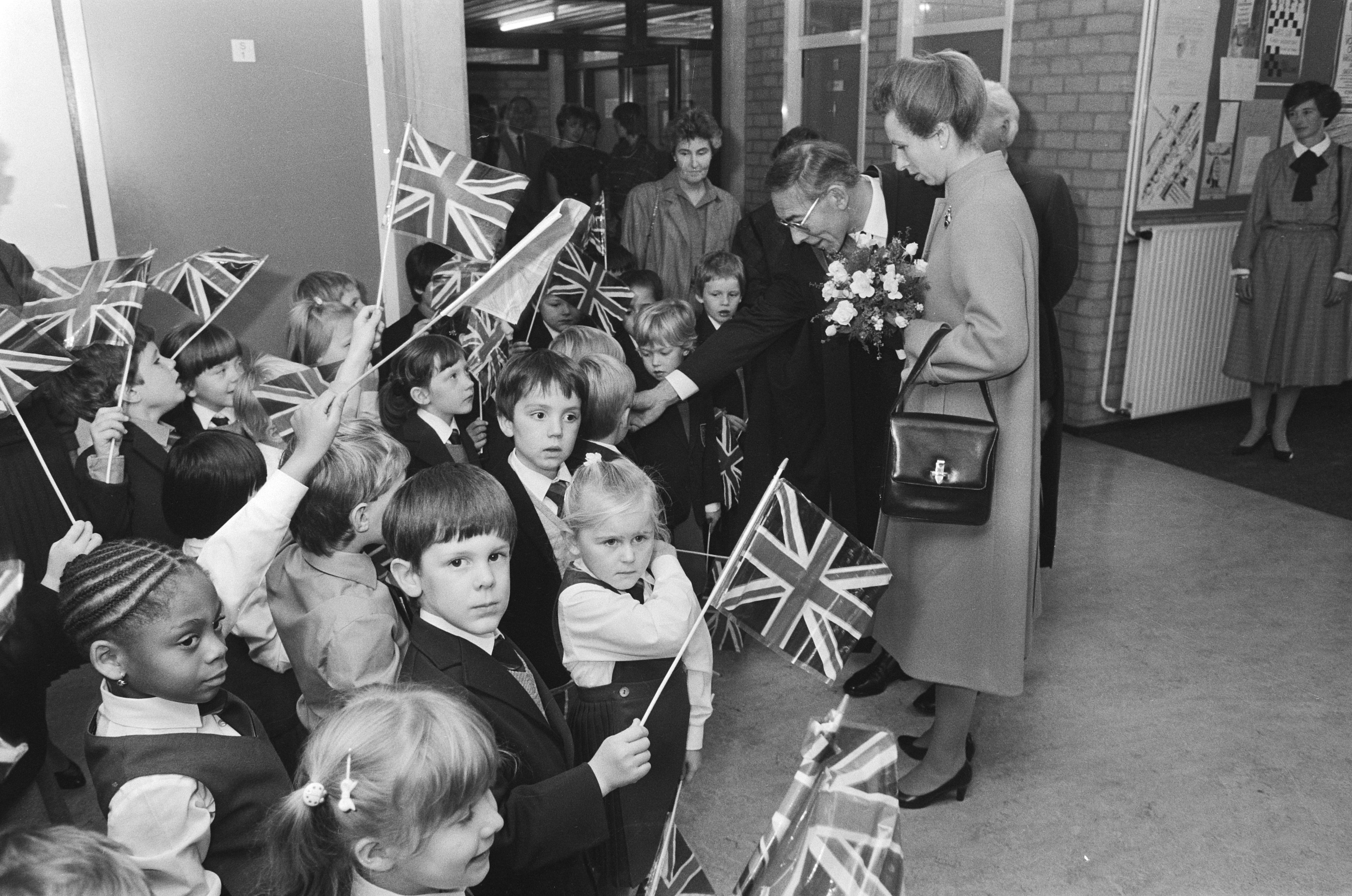
Princess Anne visits Voorschoten in 1984. Pictured with former headmaster Brian Davidson.

The British School in the Netherlands (BSN) is an IB-classified group of private schools situated in The Hague area. Four campuses together form one school: Junior School Leidschenveen, Junior School Vlaskamp, Senior School Voorschoten, and Senior School Leidschenveen. Over 2100 students from nearly 90 nationalities are enrolled.

The school is open to students from 3 to 18 years of age and also offers daycare for 0–3s and after-school care on its Junior School Leidschenveen campus through Zein International Childcare.

The schools all follow the English curriculum, which means that students take GCSEs in Years 10 and 11 (age 14 to 16) and enter Sixth Form in Years 12 and 13 (age 16 to 18). From here, students may choose to take examinations in either English A-levels or the IB Diploma Programme.

The school was founded in 1931 in The Hague by Gwen Brunton-Jones and given the name of "The English School". It has since become Europe's largest international school, with students from nearly 90 nationalities.

== Campuses ==
The British School in the Netherlands is currently arranged across four campuses, based in and around The Hague and the neighbouring town of Voorschoten. The two Junior Schools accommodate children from 3 to 11, while the Senior Schools are for children from 11 to 18.

The BSN Schools
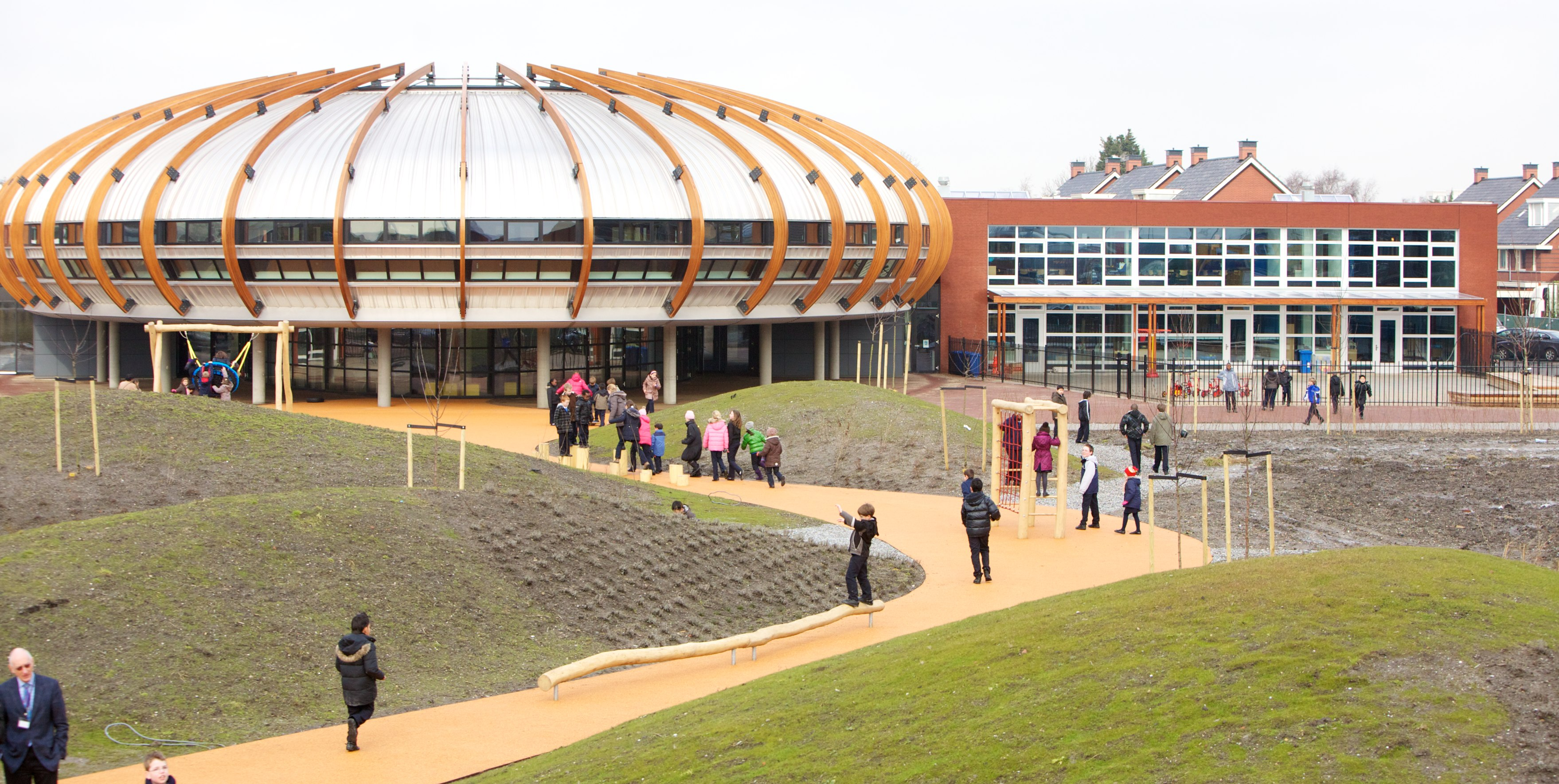
Junior School Leidschenveen

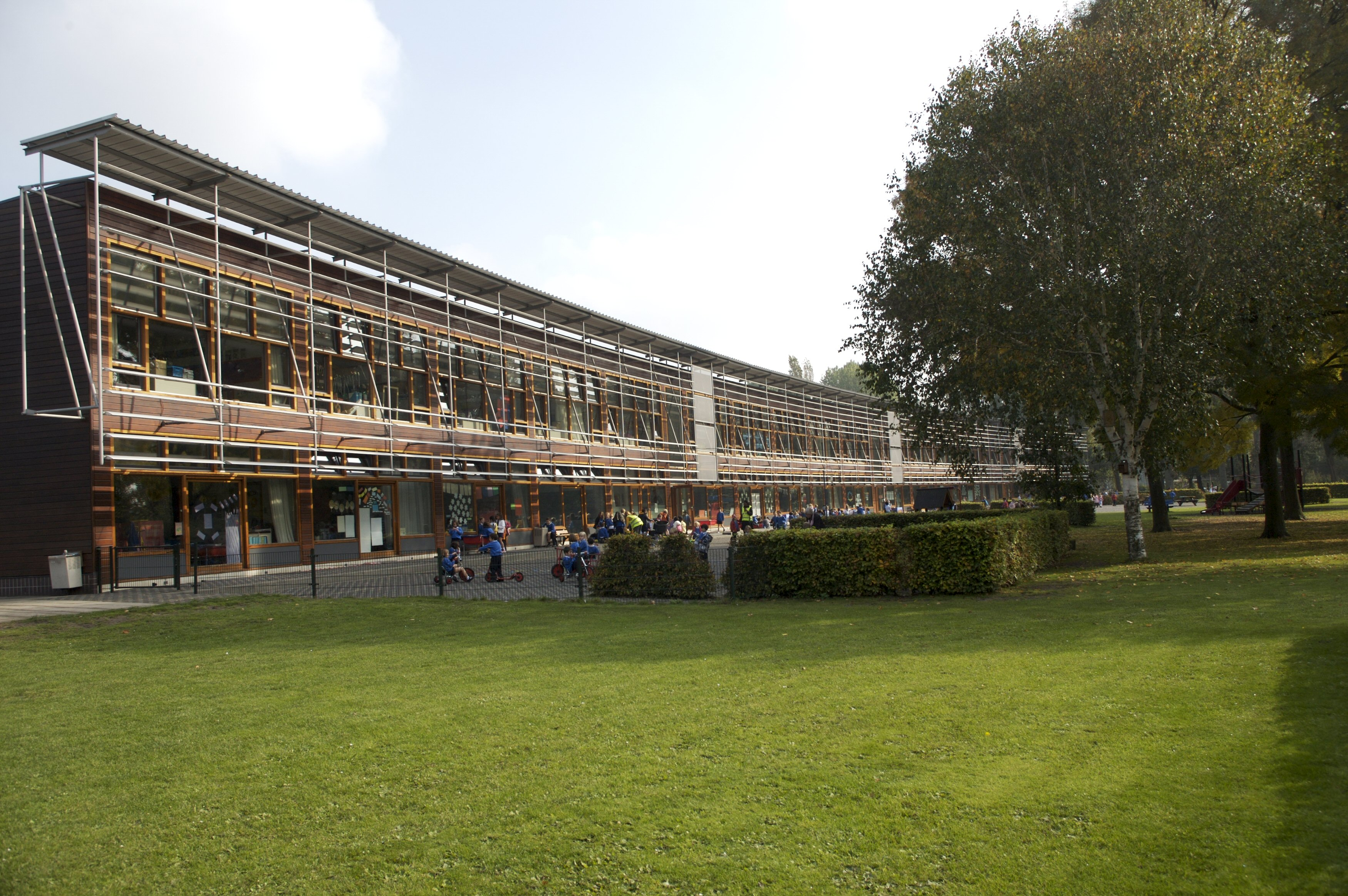
Junior School Vlaskamp

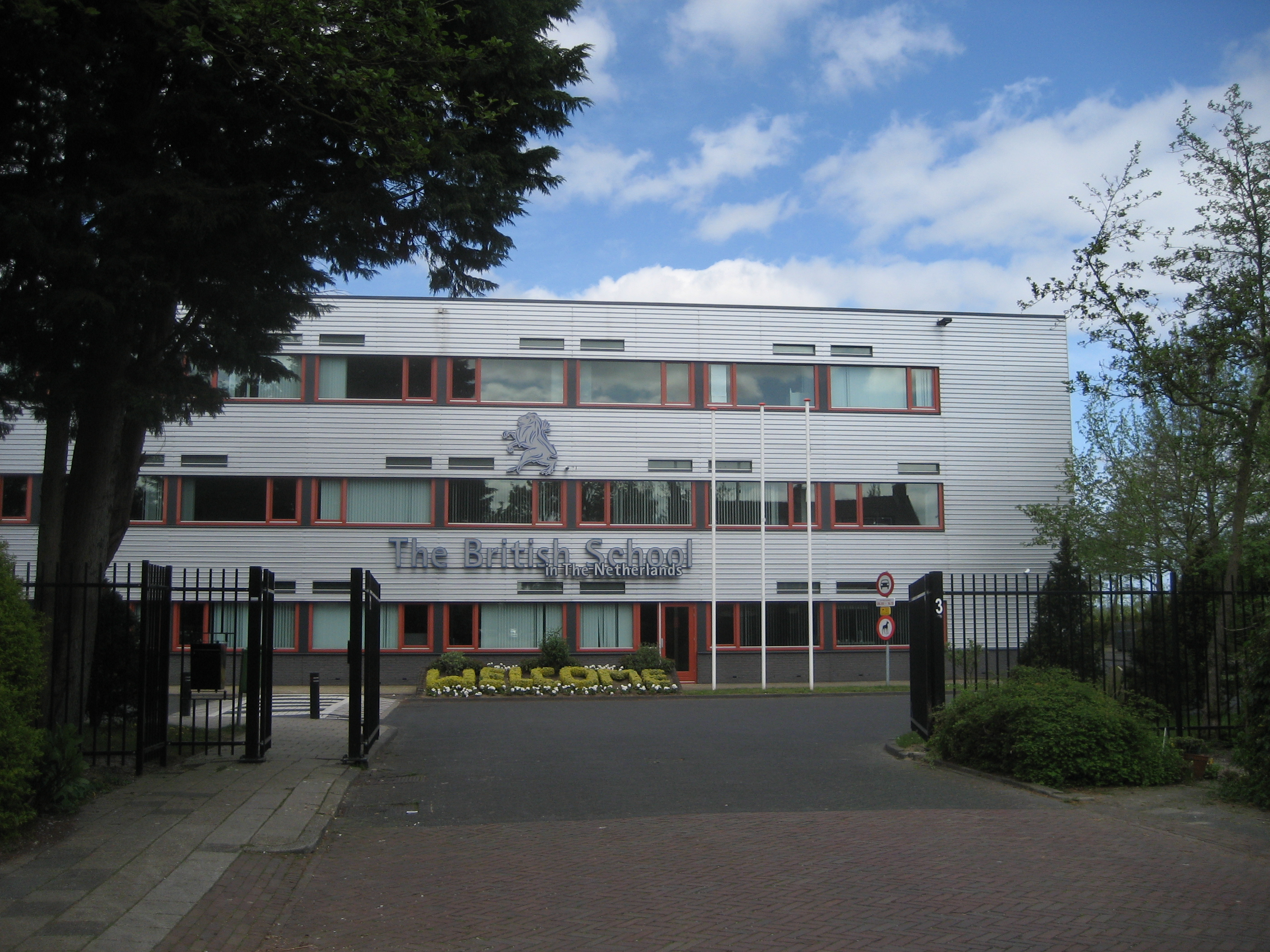
Senior School Voorschoten

=== Junior School Leidschenveen ===
Junior School Leidschenveen (JSL) is a campus in the Leidschenveen area of The Hague, providing accommodation for 470 children aged 3 to 11 years. It was opened in 2010 by Princess Maxima. The campus includes facilities for out-of-school care, a daycare centre for 0- to 3-year-olds and a sports and community centre. The current Headteacher is Karren van Zoest.

=== Junior School Vlaskamp ===
Junior School Vlaskamp (JSV) is a campus in the Mariahoeve area of The Hague, providing accommodation for approximately 600 children aged 3 to 11. This award-winning building was opened in 1997. It is situated adjacent to the Mariahoeve Tennis Club and the VUC Football Club.

=== Junior School Diamanthorst ===
Junior School Diamanthorst (JSD) was a former campus in the Mariahoeve area of The Hague, located around 1 kilometer east of JSV, with accommodation for approximately 200 children aged 3 to 11. It was opened in 2003 by the founding Headteacher, Paul Ellis. Until its closure in 2023, it was the smallest of the five BSN campuses. As of 2025, part of the former campus is being used by a daycare service.

=== Senior School Voorschoten ===
Situated in Voorschoten, just outside The Hague, Senior School Voorschoten (SSV) is the largest of the four campuses, with a capacity for up to 1,100 students. The Senior School has sports fields, hockey pitches, and tennis courts. The classrooms include specialist areas such as design and technology; ICT; food technology; art and music; and the three sciences. Students can study French, German, Dutch, Spanish, Chinese, Italian, and other languages as part of the native speaker programme. There is a library and resources area, a school hall with stage and professional theatrical lighting, a cafeteria, and a sports hall.

=== Senior School Leidschenveen ===
Situated in Leidschenveen, Senior School Leidschenveen (SSL) has capacity for 550 students, from ages 11 to 18. It is located adjacent to the Junior School campus, and was opened in 2018. It has similar facilities to the Voorschoten campus.

== School organisation ==
The BSN is a not-for-profit organisation entirely dependent on fee income and receives no subsidy from either the Dutch or British governments. The school is managed by a Board of Management chaired by the CEO, Louise Simpson, and composed of senior managers within the school’s teaching and support staff. This board is answerable to the Board of Governors, which is responsible for strategic supervision and, in turn, reports to the School Association.

== History ==
The school was founded in The Hague in 1931 by a New Zealander, Gwen Brunton-Jones, and was called "The English School". There were four teachers and about twenty pupils who were accommodated in a school on the Van Diepenburchstraat. The school closed in 1940 with the invasion of the Netherlands and was re-opened in 1948 by Nancy Macdona, a previous staff member. Two rooms were rented in the Jan van Nassaustraat: twelve pupils and four teachers formed the foundations of the present British School.

By 1952 numbers had reached sixty and new premises were found on the Adriaan Goekooplaan. Expansion continued, and Ms Macdona recruited a co-principal, Phyllis Donaldson, to take responsibility for the growing number of older children. In 1953 there was another move to Doornstraat, and then in 1954, the school was merged with the American and French Schools as part of the International School project. This turned out to be a catastrophe, and the school soon withdrew from it. That meant that with about eighty children and half a dozen teachers, they had no premises. The chaplain of the Anglo-American Church allowed them to move into his church hall on the Riouwstraat, where they remained until 1959. In that year, at last, the school bought its own property, Duinroos, on the Tapijtweg.

With expansion continuing, a Senior Division was opened in 1966 in Parkweg and, four years later, a Middle Division on the Van Stolklaan. The school was renamed The British School in the Netherlands in 1976.

Two years later, the Senior School moved to Voorschoten. The Junior School remained at Tapijtweg, and the Infant School had to move to rented classrooms in a Dutch school in Leidschendam. By now, the school had taken over the management of a small 'dépendance' in the northern town of Assen where many English-speaking Shell families lived.

In July 1999, a three-storey school building just a couple of minutes' walk from the Junior School, was purchased and, after refurbishment, became a new Foundation School, which opened in September 1999. Junior School Diamanthorst: the second development, was opened in September 2003, when the opportunity arose to take over an unused Dutch school nearby, making it possible to have two separate Junior Schools.

In order to put the Senior School in a position where it could keep up with projected growth, Principal Trevor Rowell and the school board took the decision that the entire SSV campus needed to be rebuilt. This started in 2001 and was completed in 2003.

The BSN opened a new campus in the Leidschenveen area of The Hague in 2010.

== Notable alumni ==
- Myles Allen, Professor at the University of Oxford, attended the BSN between 1973 and 1983
- Anna Bentley, Olympic fencer and 3 times national champion, left the BSN in 1999
- Jon Brittain, Olivier Award-winning playwright and director, attended the BSN between 2000 and 2005
- Victoria Hollins, BBC London journalist, attended the BSN between 1989 and 1991
- Joseph O' Neill, novelist and non-fiction writer, attended the BSN from 1970 to 1981
- Anna Walker, English television presenter, attended the BSN from 1979 to 1981
- Bojoura, a folk and pop vocalist, attended the BSN (then called The English School) in the early 1960s
- Samantha Dubois, broadcaster on Radio Caroline, attended the BSN between 1969 and 1970
- Frank Gardner, British journalist, reporter and author, attended the BSN during the 1960s
- Jason Kingdon, computer scientist and entrepreneur, attended the BSN between 1970 and 1979
- Isabelle Westbury, sports writer, broadcaster, lawyer and international cricket player, attended the BSN between 2001 and 2006
- Antoinette van Belle Actress, notable for her prominent roles in long-running Dutch television series such as Goede tijden, slechte tijden and Medisch Centrum West. Attended the BSN between 1982 and 1984.
