= Alton Locke =

1850 novel by Charles Kingsley

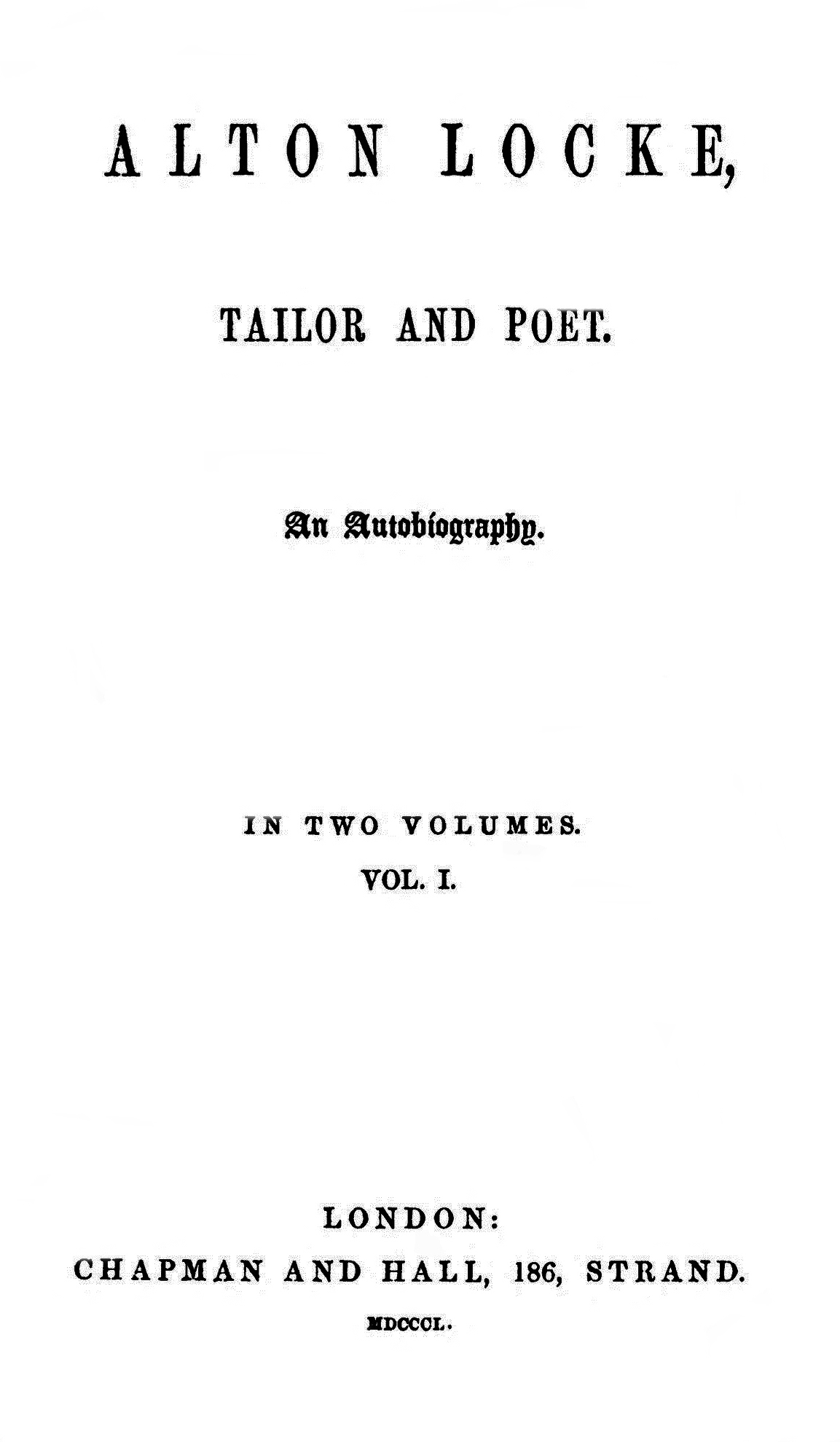
- First edition title page
- Author: Charles Kingsley
- Publication date: 1850

Alton Locke is an 1850 novel, by Charles Kingsley, written in sympathy with the Chartist movement, in which Carlyle is introduced as one of the personages. Locke is based on the life of Thomas Cooper, a Leicester shoemaker, who Kingsley knew well.

== Overview ==
In this novel, Kingsley set out to expose the social injustice suffered by workers in the clothing trade and the trials and tribulations of agricultural labourers. It also gives an insight into the Chartist campaign with which Kingsley was involved in the 1840s.

== Plot ==
Alton Locke is the story of a young tailor-boy who has instincts and aspirations beyond the normal expectations of his working-class background. He is intensely patriotic and has ambitions to be a poet. In the course of the narrative, Alton Locke loves and struggles in vain.

Physically, he is a weak man, but is able to encompass all the best emotions, along with vain longings, wild hopes, and a righteous indignation at the plight of his contemporaries. He joins the Chartist movement because he can find no better vehicle by which to improve the lot of the working class, experiencing a sense of devastation at its apparent failure. Utterly broken in spirit, Alton Locke sails for America to seek a new life there; however, he barely reaches the shore of the New World before he dies.
