= Mollie Walter =

British Girl Guide executive and nurse

- Walter in a 1945 newspaper
- Born: Mollie Barbara Walter; April 1911; East Preston, Sussex, England
- Died: 3 December 1951 (aged 40); Worthing, England
- Education: London Hospital Medical College
- Occupation: Nurse

Mollie Walter (April 1911 – 3 December 1951) was a state registered nurse and Girl Guide leader who volunteered with the Guide International Service (GIS) in post-war Holland and Germany from 1944 to 1946. She helped renovate the Guide Club after WWII and served as its housekeeper until her death in 1951.

== Personal life ==
Walter was born to Edward Wiles Walter and Margaret Phyllis Walter. She had one brother. She attended the London Hospital Medical College between 1932 and 1935, becoming a state registered nurse.

== Girl Guides ==
Walter was Brown Owl for 2nd (St Paul's) Brownie pack and Captain for 14th (Baptist) Guide company in Worthing for 20 years.

=== Guide International Service (GIS) ===
In October 1944, Walter joined the Guide International Service (GIS), which had been established two years previously with the aim of sending teams of adult Girl Guides into Europe after World War II to aid with relief work. She trained in London for three months before joining the 2nd Hospital Team as a senior nurse. In March 1945, just before leaving, they were "entertained by the Queen in the drawing room at Buckingham Palace."

The team travelled to Holland in February 1945 where Walter fought a typhoid epidemic at Gorinchem. When the group moved to Germany, Walter worked at a hospital and maternity ward at a camp for displaced people for 18 months. Walter took the trefoil from the top of the 14th (Baptist) Guide company's standard and tied it to the truck that she drove for the mobile hospital service. She was awarded the France and Germany Star on 13 December 1948 for her service.

=== The Guide Club ===
Walter returned to England in 1947, and after working alongside other GIS volunteers to bring the recently purchased 46 Belgrave Square premises "up to Grosvenor Estate post-war standards" she became the first housekeeper of the newly opened Guide Club, a position she held until her death. She would give talks on her experience with the GIS.

After her death, the Mollie Walter Memorial fund was organised by members of the GIS and the Guide Club with money donated to the club. Another fund, organised by Worthing Girl Guides, enabled a trek cart and money to be donated to the new Guide headquarters in Worthing. The presentation was made by fellow GIS volunteer, Margery Davies.

== Other ==
Walter served as a councillor on the Worthing branch of the National Council of Women and the Women's Citizen's Association.
