= Katherine Rundell =

English author and academic (born 1987)

Katherine Rundell FRSL
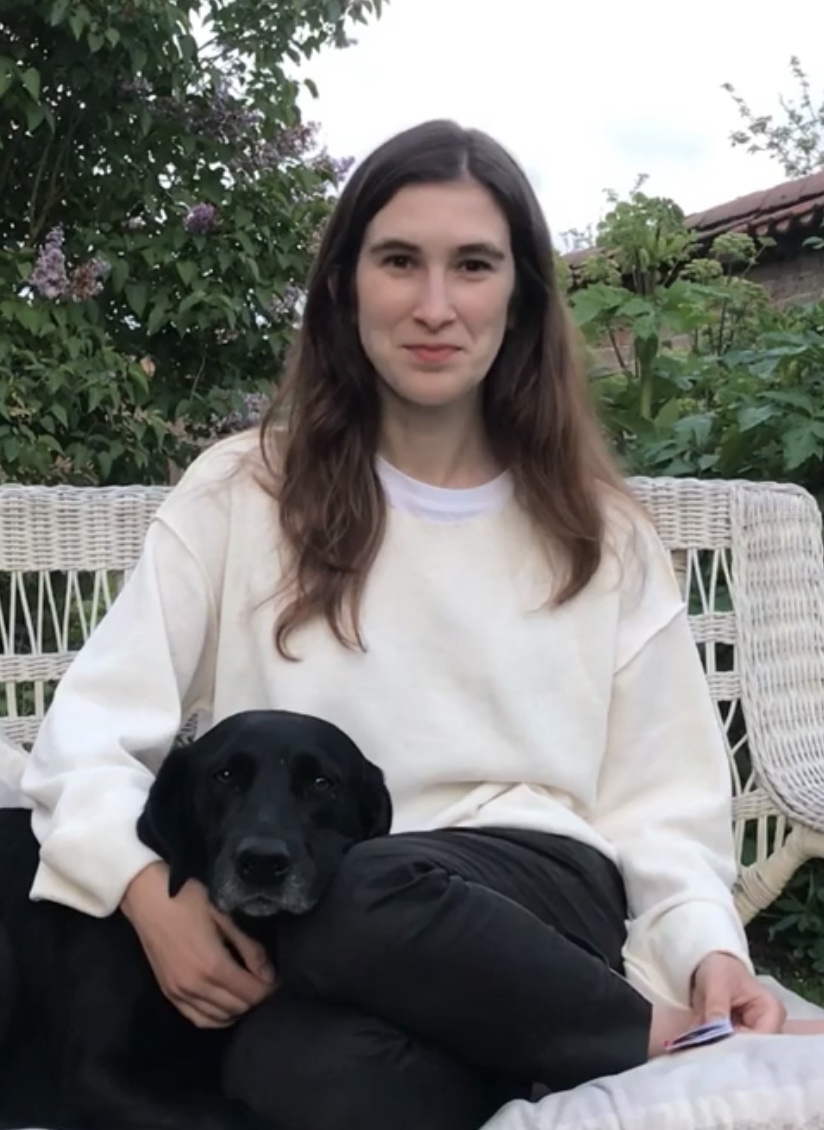
- Rundell in 2020
- Born: Katherine Rundell; 10 July 1987 (age 39); Pembury, England
- Education: British School of Brussels
- Alma mater: University of Oxford (BA, MSt, DPhil)
- Occupations: Author; playwright; academic
- Writing career
- Genres: Children's fiction, non-fiction
- Notable works: Rooftoppers (2013); Life According to Saki (2017); The Explorer (2017); The Good Thieves (2019); Super-Infinite: The Transformations of John Donne (2022); Impossible Creatures (2023)
- Notable awards: Boston Globe–Horn Book Award (2015); Costa Book Award (2017); Baillie Gifford Prize (2022)
- Website: www.asc.ox.ac.uk/person/katherine-rundell

Katherine Rundell FRSL (born 10 July 1987) is an English author and academic. She is the author of Impossible Creatures, named Waterstones Book of the Year for 2023. She is also the author of Rooftoppers, which in 2015 won both the overall Waterstones Children's Book Prize and the Blue Peter Book Award for Best Story, and was shortlisted for the Carnegie Medal. She is a Fellow of All Souls College, Oxford and has appeared as an expert guest on BBC Radio 4 programmes including Start the Week, Poetry Please, Seriously.... and Private Passions.

Rundell's other books include The Girl Savage, released in 2014 in a slightly revised form as Cartwheeling in Thunderstorms in the United States, where it was the winner of the 2015 Boston Globe–Horn Book Award for fiction, The Wolf Wilder (2015), and The Explorer (2017), winner of the children's book prize at the 2017 Costa Book Awards. Her 2022 book Super-Infinite: The Transformations of John Donne won the Baillie Gifford Prize, making her the youngest ever winner of the award. In 2024, Rundell was named author of the year at the British Book Awards.

== Early life and education ==
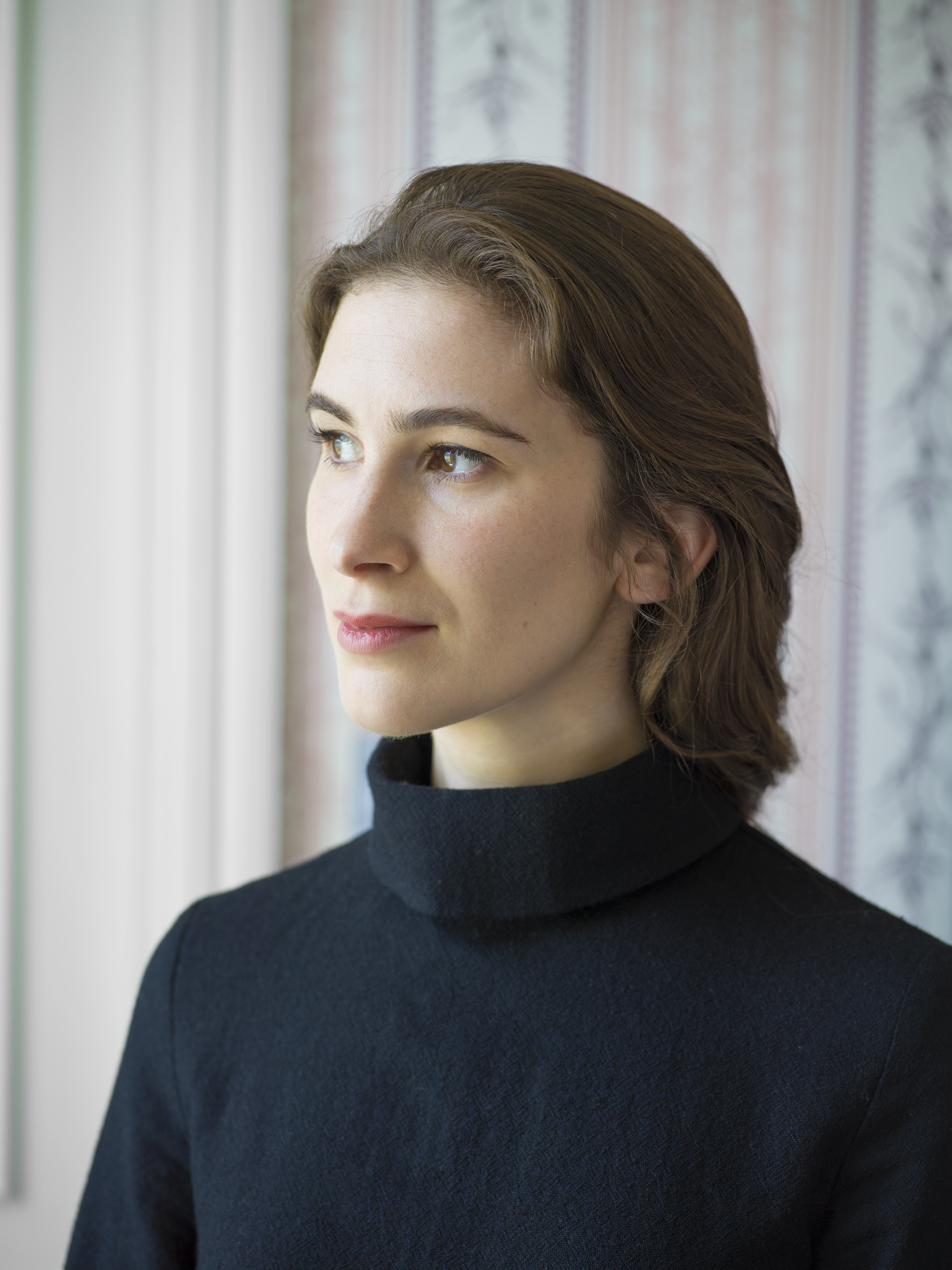
Author photograph of Katherine Rundell by Nina Subin

Rundell was born in Kent, England on 10 July 1987 and spent ten years in Harare, Zimbabwe, where her father was a diplomat. When she was 14 years old, her family moved to Brussels, where she attended the fee-paying British School of Brussels. Rundell later told Newsweek's Tim de Lisle that it was a culture shock, saying:

"In Zimbabwe, school ended every day at 1 o’clock. I didn’t wear shoes, and there was none of the teenage culture that exists in Europe. My friends and I were still climbing trees and having swimming competitions".

De Lisle notes, "She gives Belgium some credit for broadening her mind […] But she resented it too, to the point where all her books, and her play, contain a joke at Belgium's expense".

She completed her undergraduate studies at the University of Oxford as an undergraduate at St Catherine's College, Oxford (2005–2008). During this period she developed an interest in rooftopping, inspired by a 1937 book, The Night Climbers of Cambridge, about the adventures of undergraduate students.

After her undergraduate degree, Rundell secured an examination fellowship at All Souls College, Oxford. She told The Bookseller's Anna James that the examination process had included a three-hour written paper on the single word "novelty", and added: "I wrote about Derridean deconstructionist theory and Christmas crackers [...] I feel like they might have let me in despite rather than because of it." She completed her doctoral thesis in 2016 on the work of John Donne supervised by Bart van Es.

== Career ==
Rundell's first book, published in 2011, was The Girl Savage; it told the story of Wilhelmina Silver, a girl from Zimbabwe, who is sent to an English boarding-school following the death of her father. A slightly revised version was released in the United States in 2014, under the title Cartwheeling in Thunderstorms, where it won the 2015 Boston Globe–Horn Book Award for fiction.

Her second book, Rooftoppers, followed the adventures of Sophie, apparently orphaned in a shipwreck on her first birthday. Sophie later attempts to find her mother, who she is convinced survived the disaster, whilst also taking to the rooftops of Paris in order to thwart officials trying to send her to a British orphanage. It won the overall Waterstones Children's Book Prize and the Blue Peter Book Award for Best Story, and was shortlisted for the Carnegie Medal. Translated into French by Emmanuelle Ghez as Le ciel nous appartient pour Les Grandes Personnes it was the winner of the 2015 Prix Sorcières Junior novels category.

Rundell's third novel, The Wolf Wilder, tells the story of Feodora, who prepares wolf cubs – kept as status-symbol pets by wealthy Russians – for release into the wild when they become too large and unmanageable for their owners.

Rundell's play Life According to Saki, with David Paisley in the title role, won the 2016 Carol Tambor Best of Edinburgh Award and opened Off-Broadway in February 2017.

Rundell's fourth novel, The Explorer, tells the survival story of a group of children whose plane crashes in the Amazon rainforest, and a secret they uncover. It won the 2017 Costa Book Award in the Children's Book category. Following the award, Rundell discussed the book's environmental themes and her research, which included eating tinned tarantulas, on BBC Radio 4's Front Row. It won the 2018 Edward Stanford Travel Writing Award in the Food & Travel Book of the Year category.

Rundell's fifth novel, The Good Thieves, tells the story of a girl named Vita who travels from England to New York with her mother to look after her grieving grandfather.

Rundell was elected a Fellow of the Royal Society of Literature (FRSL) in 2020.

In 2022, she published Super-Infinite: The Transformations of John Donne, which won the 2022 Baillie Gifford Prize and was praised by Claire Tomalin and Andrew Motion, among others. What distinguishes Rundell's biography and makes it worth reading is, according to Professor of English Literature Joe Moshenska in Literary Review, that she is above all a writer, well-versed in the art of prose: "Rather than telling us why Donne is worth reading and absorbing into one’s way of thinking, her writing shows us."

As reported by The Guardian, "She is giving the Baillie Gifford prize money to charity: to Blue Ventures, an ocean-based conservation organisation, and also to a refugee charity. The reason? 'No man is an island,' she says, citing that most famous of all Donne lines."

In 2023, Rundell published fantasy adventure Impossible Creatures, which was awarded the British Book Award Children's Fiction Book of the Year and best book in England. In February 2024, it was confirmed that the Impossible Creatures series will include five books in total. The second book in the series, The Poisoned King, was released in 2025. In October 2025, Walt Disney Studios acquired the rights to adapt Impossible Creatures into a live-action film series to be produced by Walt Disney Pictures, and in September 2026, Rundell released her third book in the series, The Neverfear.

=== Publications ===
Rundell's published work includes:

- The Girl Savage
- Rooftoppers
- Cartwheeling in Thunderstorms
- The Wolf Wilder
- The Explorer
- One Christmas Wish
- Into the Jungle: Stories for Mowgli
- The Good Thieves
- Why You Should Read Children's Books, Even Though You Are So Old and Wise
- Skysteppers
- Super-Infinite: The Transformations of John Donne
- The Zebra's Great Escape
- The Golden Mole
- Impossible Creatures
- Impossible Creatures Book 2: The Poisoned King
- Impossible Creatures Book 3: The Neverfear

== Personal life ==
Rundell's hobbies include tightrope walking and roof walking.
