= Deborah Lawrenson =

British novelist and journalist

Deborah Lawrenson (born November 1960 in London, England) is a British novelist and journalist.

She was educated at Blackheath High School, The British School of Brussels and Eastbourne College, and read English at Trinity College, Cambridge. She trained as a journalist on the Kentish Times, then worked for The Daily Mail, Mail on Sunday and Woman's Journal. Her novels Hot Gossip (1994), Idol Chatter (1995), The Moonbathers (1998), The Art of Falling (2005) and Songs of Blue and Gold (2008) were all published by Random House UK. The Lantern (2011) was her first to be published in the United States, by HarperCollins, and by Orion in the UK. It was featured on Channel 4's The TV Book Club in 2011, and short listed for Romantic Novel of the Year 2012 (Epic category) by the Romantic Novelists' Association. The Sea Garden was published in 2014, and 300 Days of Sun in 2016. Her novels have been translated into twelve languages. In October 2016, 300 Days of Sun was selected as one of the Great Group Reads for National Reading Group Month, run by the Women's National Book Association in the USA. Lawrenson is the co-author, with her husband Robert Rees, of two cosy murder mysteries set in the South of France: “Death in Provence” and “Death in Avignon”. Her novel “The Secretary”, a Cold War espionage thriller set in Moscow, was published in 2025 and is based on her mother's diaries. Lawrenson lives in Kent and Provence.
