= Guide Club =

Private members' club for Girl Guide leaders and executives

The Guide Club
- Formation: 1948
- Dissolved: 1976
- Type: Private members' club
- Headquarters: 46 Belgrave Square, London
- Location: London
- Members: 1,000 (min.)
- Owner: Girl Guides Association

The Guide Club was a London-based private members' club run by the Girl Guide Association (GGA) between 1948 and 1976. Its purpose was to provide accommodation and a place to meet for Guide leaders coming from outside the capital.

== Early days ==
The idea of a club for Girl Guiding's adult members was initiated by Lady Clarendon and Rosa Ward, the Guide International Service (GIS) chair. In March 1947 a venue was chosen, and 46 Belgrave Square – only "seven minutes' walk from Guide headquarters" on Buckingham Palace Road – was leased for the purpose, using a £9,000 loan from GIS funds.

The building had been badly damaged during the war. Seven members of the GIS, who had returned from service in continental Europe, lodged "in great discomfort" in the building's stable while they worked to "bring it up to Grosvenor Estate post-war standards". GIS volunteer Mollie Walter became the club's first housekeeper. By November 1947, the building was converted into accommodation for up to 30 people in single, double and shared rooms covering around 10,000 sq ft. The building included "intercommunicating mews and a four-car garage".

In the run-up to the opening, there was a big push among the Guiding community to collect donated and loaned furniture and decorations. HRH Princess Elizabeth donated money which was used to purchase a chandelier. £10,000 was allocated from the Chief's Memorial Fund to go towards furniture and equipment. The Guide Club opened on 2 November 1948, with the first reviews published in the January 1949 edition of The Guider magazine.

The club's facilities included "all the amenities of a West End club" including reception rooms, a writing room, an information bureau, a dining room, a snack bar and a bar. In 1956 the club added televisions and in 1960 hot and cold running water was installed in some bedrooms. A lift was installed in 1961. Membership included access to Belgrave Square's garden and tennis court.

== Membership ==
Initially the following people were eligible to join The Guide Club:

- Active commissioners and Guiders throughout the Empire
- Ex-Guider members of the Trefoil Guild
- GGA council members
- GGA executive committee and sub-committee members

The initial joining fee was £3 3s and the annual subscription was £2 2s (£3 3s for those living within 50 miles of the club). Members were allowed to stay for a maximum of seven consecutive nights for a total maximum of 28 nights per year. In an effort to attract more members, the joining fee was suspended between June and October 1949. In 1950 the joining fee was reduced to £2 2s, and the distance from the club recalibrated to 25 miles.

The initial goal was 1,000 members. This was achieved in 1950, including 64 overseas members. The goal was then increased to 1,500. In 1952 membership was extended to all members of the movement over the age of 18, including Cadets, Rangers and Guides, which became a Junior Membership in the following year, available for a reduced price. By 1954, membership was extended to anyone with a present or past connection to the movement. In 1958 membership stood at 1,100 and by 1961 it was 1,417 with 30 countries represented in overseas memberships. By the time the club closed membership stood at around 1,200.

=== Committee ===
The club's first committee comprised Lady Oaksey (chair), Lady Clarendon (vice-chair), Dame Joan Marsham (hon. treasurer) and G E Maynard (resident secretary). The club's first AGM was held on 31 March 1954 with Marsham as chair and Lady Cochrane present as her successor. It was reported that 1953 was the club's first financially successful year.

== Royal visits ==
Queen Elizabeth paid an "informal visit" to the club on 1 March 1949. She was received by the committee together with Lady Baden-Powell and chief commissioner, Lady Finola Somers. At the time of her visit the club was hosting members from Tristan da Cunha, Barbados, India, Pakistan, Australia, Canada, New Zealand, Ceylon, Hong Kong, Sierra Leone and Norway.

Mary, Princess Royal visited on "several occasions" in the club's early years In 1958, on the club's tenth anniversary, the Princess Royal became its president would attend the club's AGM.

== Additional fund-raising ==
In the early months of the club's opening, before all the beds were needed for bookings, several beds were let as "permanent accommodation" for members wishing to live in London at a cost of £3 / £2 10s per week.

The club would host "Musical Evenings" and "Bring and Buy" sales to raise money for its Amenities Fund. The club would also host talks by experts including Mary Cuningham Chater. Some club members, such as Mollie Walter, had memorial funds donated to the club in their name. Function rooms were also rented out to third parties, including the British Red Cross, the YMCA, St John Ambulance the Clan Donnichaidh Society and the Black Welsh Mountain Sheep Breeders Association. Guide groups from across the UK would also donate money to the club, including Burnley Trefoil Guild donating two guineas in 1954.

A 21st Birthday appeal in 1970 raised £3,345 from over 800 members.

== Final years ==
At the 1963 AGM the club's president, The Princess Royal, voiced her concern about the club's future saying, "Will you make more and more people realize what a lovely Club we have here; what a welcome it gives to those who enter its hospitable doors, and what a bargain they get for such a small subscription?"

Lady Baden-Powell held her 78th birthday at the Club in 1967 with a sit-down lunch for 82 members of her family.

The Trefoil Guild was based at the club from 1971.

Plans were made public about selling the property and moving to a new location in 1972. About the proposed sale, the club secretary Beryl Gibson said "We are very fond of Belgrave Square, but we realise we are sitting on a very expensive property and think we could get something else which would not cost as much."

The club closed permanently in December 1974, citing general "rising costs" and the "costs of living in Belgrave Square." The balance of the club's finances was put towards "exceptional non-recurring projects of a capital nature." In her final article about the club, in the February 1978 issue of The Guider, Anstice Gibbs, the club's final chair, referred to the "rather difficult last few years." The sale raised £500,000 which covered the remaining 69 years on the lease.

After the club closed some members continued to meet at the Voluntary Aid Detachment (VAD) Ladies' Club, their members having been associate members of the Guide Club since the early 1950s.
