= Victoria Hollins =

British journalist

Victoria Hollins is a British journalist, who works for BBC London News as a reporter and newsreader, mostly working the early morning bulletins on BBC Breakfast. On the 8 June 2023, Hollins participated in industrial action in support of the fight against cuts in BBC Local Radio.

== Early life ==
Hollins studied at the British School in the Netherlands and the British School of Brussels, before studying at the University of Birmingham from 1995. She then did a post graduate diploma in Journalism at Cardiff University.

== Journalism career ==
Hollins joined the BBC in 1999 on their journalistic training scheme, working on local BBC radio stations, then as a news presenter on BBC Radio 5 Live. She spent five years at BBC London 94.9, before joining the BBC London News on TV.

== Other activities ==
In 2011, Hollins appeared as a television presenter in the BBC sitcom Life's Too Short.
