= Narrative verdict =

Verdict available to coroners in England, Wales and Ireland

A narrative verdict is a verdict available to coroners in England and Wales and in Northern Ireland and The Republic of Ireland following an inquest. In such a verdict the circumstances of a death are recorded, being a brief free-form, factual statement (either instead of, or in addition to, one of the standard, and familiar, Short-Form Conclusions), which does not attribute the cause to an individual. Narrative verdicts were introduced to England and Wales in 2004.

== Historical examples ==
The inquest into the death of Charlotte Shaw concluded with a narrative verdict in October 2010. Charlotte Shaw drowned while crossing a swollen stream on Dartmoor during training for Ten Tors in 2007.

A coroner delivered a narrative verdict into the death of Secret Intelligence Service officer Gareth Williams whose decaying corpse was found padlocked into a red sports bag in the bath at his home in August 2010.

A further narrative verdict was delivered following the death of former footballer Gary Speed, who was found hanged in his garage on 27 November 2011.
