= Rosa Ward =

Welsh Girl Guide leader

Rosa Ward OBE
- Ward from a 1939 issue of The Guider
- Born: Rosa Cliff Ward; 10 April 1893; Bengal, India
- Died: 17 August 1984 (aged 91); Dorset, England
- Occupation: Girl Guide leader

Rosa Ward OBE, JP (10 April 1893 – 17 August 1984) was a pioneer of the Girl Guide movement. She was chair of the Guide International Service from 1942 to 1954. She was a recipient of the Silver Fish Award, the movement's highest adult honour.

== Girl Guides ==
Ward formed 1st Denbigh Guide Company, North Wales’ first Guide company, in 1912. Four years later she organised what is likely to have been the first Guide camp in Wales at Segrwyd, Denbigh. Between 1917-1946 she was Denbighshire’s first County Commissioner. In the 1930s she was Guide Commissioner for Camping. From 1939-1944 she was Chief Commissioner for Wales and from 1946-1956 Denbighshire County President.

Together with Lady Clarendon, Ward initiated the idea of a club for Girl Guiding's adult members. The Guide Club ran from its location in Belgrave Square from 1949 to 1976, when it closed for financial reasons.

From 1961 to her death in 1984 she was vice-president of the Girl Guides Association.

== Guide International Service ==
The Guide International Service (GIS) was formed in April 1942. It was one of 11 societies forming the Council of British Societies for Relief Abroad (COBSRA). It provided 50 teams of volunteer adult Girl Guide leaders to work in close cooperation with the British government and the United Nations Relief and Rehabilitation Administration (UNRRA). Each team provided on-the-ground support in Europe after World War II, including Bergen-Belsen displaced persons camp.

Ward agreed to be temporary chair of the GIS committee until “a more suitable person was found”. She held the position for 12 years, the entire duration of the organisation's existence. In this role she organised training, test camps and lectures for prospective recruits. She also oversaw a significant fundraising effort to equip teams and train volunteer leaders, with Girl Guides in the UK and across the Commonwealth raising £168,890 (equivalent to £4,600,000 in 2023) towards GIS's relief work.

Ward first travelled to the British occupation zone in Germany in November 1945, making an annual tour of every GIS team in Europe for the subsequent five years.

== Awards and honours ==
- 1928 – Silver Fish Award
- 1948 – OBE for her work with GIS
- 1997 – two stained glass windows were dedicated to Ward in the main hall of Tŷ Clwyd, Girlguiding Clwyd's County House in Llanfair Talhaiarn where “the rays of light stream through to inspire the next generation of Rainbows, Brownies) and Guides.”
- 2017 – Ward's outstanding commitment to Guiding in Wales and the GIS was recognised in the Welsh Year of Legends

== Personal life ==
Rosa Cliff Ward was born in Dunga Gali, Bengal, India to father Brigadier General Thomas Ward and mother Jeanette Octavia. She had a younger sister, Barbara. By 1901 she was living in Aldershot, England. During World War I she was a member of Denbigh's Voluntary Aid Detachment. In 1942 she was appointed Justice of the peace for Denbighshire. Ward died at home in Corscombe, Dorset in 1984.
