= British School of Brussels =

International school in Tervuren, Belgium

Coordinates: 50.832°N 4.524°E

Established	1970
School type	British School and International School
Principal	James Penstone
Location	Tervuren, Belgium
Campus	15 acres (6.1 ha)
Athletic Leagues	ISST, GISGA, IAPS
Website	britishschool.be

The British School of Brussels (commonly abbreviated to BSB), is an international school in Belgium. It occupies a site of about 15 acres (6.1 ha) surrounded by woodland near the Royal Museum of Central Africa in the town of Tervuren, Flemish Brabant, east of Brussels. It has over 1200 students aged 2.5–18 years from approximately 65 nationalities. BSB consists of two schools: Primary (age 2.5–11) and Secondary (age 11–18).

BSB has a bilingual English/French programme. English and French mother-tongue teachers teach students aged 4–14 in a 50/50 timetable covering both languages.

In 2016, BSB opened the Jacques Rogge Sports Centre on campus. As a result, BSB is said to have the best indoor school sports facilities in Europe. The new Sports Centre includes: a 25m swimming pool, gymnastics arena, dance studio, fitness suite and multi-purpose sports hall.

== History ==
The British School of Brussels was founded on 5 December 1969 by a group of businessmen led by Sir Dick Pantlin CBE, just as the UK was preparing to join the European Union. Pantlin went on to become the chairman of the board of Trustees and Honorary President of the school with Leslie Firman, the group's secretary. For its first few months it occupied temporary premises in the Rue de la Loi in Brussels. The School first opened on 15 September 1970 with 213 pupils aged 5–13 and 16 teaching staff including the first headmaster, Alan Humphries. On 9 December 1970, the Duke of Edinburgh officially opened the first building on the campus, then called Building 1. In 2006 all buildings were renamed after famous Belgian people or fictional characters such as Victor Horta and Tintin.

== Primary ==
In Primary School, students learn from a personalised curriculum inspired by the National Curriculum for England tailored to the international community. With small class sizes and a focus on inquiry-based learning, students receive education that nurtures academic growth.

The Primary School curriculum is open for ages 2.5–11. The Primary School has dedicated facilities for each age group: Early Years (ages 2.5–5), Lower Primary (ages 5–7) and Upper Primary (ages 7–11). Each part of the Primary School has its own school building and playground, allowing children to develop in a caring environment that is suited to their age group.

== Secondary ==
At the Secondary level, BSB offers a choice between A Levels, BTEC qualifications, and the IB Diploma.

== Facilities ==
- 25m swimming pool with movable floor
- Gymnastics arena
- Three multi-purpose sports halls
- Fitness suite furnished with Technogym equipment
- Dance studio
- Design and Technology workshop with CAD suite and digital printer
- Post-16 Centre, Careers, and Business Suite
- Purpose-built 240-seat Theatre
- Modern Science and Mathematics block
- Self-service Cafeteria seating 330
- Modern Languages suite
- Specialist ICT Suite
- Recording Studio
- Parents' Centre with café, information centre and rooms for social activities.

== Enrichment/Extracurricular ==
Surrounded by woodland, the campus has facilities such as a sports centre with a 25m swimming pool, fitness suite, dance studio and gymnasium. Upgraded outdoor amenities include a bouldering wall, tennis and basketball courts, football and rugby pitches and a 300m running track. BSB also has recording studios, a theatre, design-technology rooms and nutrition kitchens.

== Notable alumni ==
Deborah Lawrenson (journalist and writer)

Katherine Rundell (novelist)

Martin Vengadesan (Malaysian journalist and writer)

Joanne Vengadesan (Malaysian lawyer)

Tanya Leroy (novelist)

Richard Baker (photographer)

Victoria Hollins (journalist)

Tulio Fagim (artist)

Olivia Vinall (actress)

Laura Dowsett (rugby player for Saracens Women)

Craig Dowsett (rugby player)

Stephen Rowbotham (Olympic rower)

Nick Kennedy (rugby player)

Savenaca Vocea (Belgian rugby player)

Quentin Köster (Dutch rugby player)
