= Florence Gadesden =

British headteacher

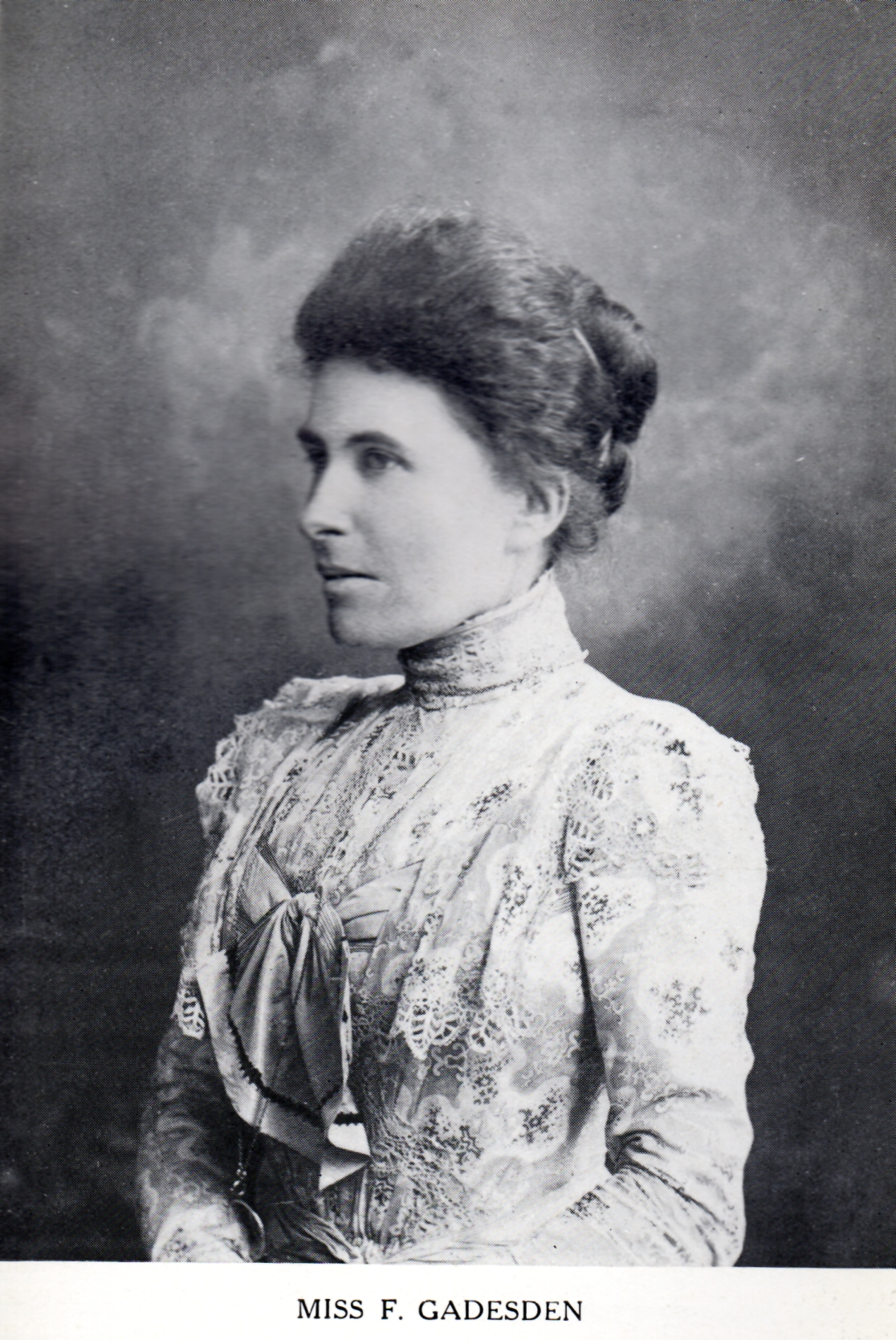
- Born: 15 May 1853; Paris
- Died: 19 May 1934 (aged 81); Cromer
- Alma mater: Girton College

Florence Marie Armroid Gad(e)sden (1853–1934) was headteacher at the Girls' Public Day School Company's Blackheath High School for over thirty years.

== Life ==
Many details of Gadesden's early life are unknown but she was born in Paris on the 15 May 1853. Her mother was Esther Elizabeth (born Atlee) and her was John Burnett Gadsden. Her father's family were cheesemongers but he taught music. Her parents had married three years before in her mother's home town of Lewisham and her elder sister Lizzie Gadesden was born in 1851. (Lizzie would also be a headteacher).

Gadesden rarely spoke of her family or varied schooling but she did leave the boarding school Sandwell Hall which was led by Frances Laetitia Selwyn. In the following year she was working for Cassandra Worthington as an assistant mistress at Minshull House school in Beckenham. She worked briefly as a governess for Edward North Buxton where she studied further to gain entry to Girton College in Cambridge. She was one of their first historians and she was awarded a 2:1 in 1870 (no Cambridge degree as she was female). She went to work in Oxford for the Girls' Public Day School Company (GPDSC) at their High School for girls.

In the 1880s she began spelling her name with two "e"s i.e. Gadesden instead of Gadsden like her parents. In 1884 she was one of the founders of the trade union called the Association of Assistant Mistresses in Secondary Schools Incorporated. She became its first honorary secretary.

Her first headship was still with the Girls' Public Day School Company, this time in Leamington Spa where she was in 1884 the founding head of what is now called The Kingsley School. Having established the school she was moved by the GPDSC in 1886 from Leamington to Blackheath where the head, Sarah Allen Olney, was leaving to set up a "more socially exclusive" school with her sister. The Times would later comment that Gadesden's appointment was an act of "incalculable wisdom".

Her new school had 300 girls and Gadesden made a strong positive impression on many of them. She introduced change - students did gym in Gymslips and the new exercise replaced the previous idea of "drill". The science facility was well equipped and it was carried out in purpose built labs.

She served as head for over thirty years and she retired in 1919.
