= Margery Davies =

British doctor and Girl Guide executive

- Davies in a 1945 newspaper
- Born: Edith Margery P Davies; 10 January 1895; Woolwich, London, UK
- Died: 20 December 1984 (aged 89); Worthing, UK
- Education: London School of Medicine for Women, Royal Free Hospital
- Occupation: Doctor

Margery Davies (10 January 1895 – 20 December 1984) was a British doctor and Girl Guide executive. She was the first female doctor to have a practice in Worthing. She volunteered in post-war Germany with the Guide International Service (GIS) in 1945.

== Personal life and education ==
Edith Margery Davies was born in Woolwich, London to Sidney Davies, a medical officer of health, and Lucy Davies. She attended Blackheath High School, studied medicine at the London School of Medicine for Women and qualified as a doctor at the Royal Free Hospital in 1920. She subsequently established a GP practice in Worthing.

In 1942, while she was out, a German Heinkel plane crashed into her garden and surgery, killing eight people. She subsequently moved house. After retiring in 1958 she moved first to Sullington and then to Ringmer. In 1969 she travelled to Canada, Australia and New Zealand, where she met Queen Elizabeth, Prince Philip and Princess Anne at a civic reception.

Her funeral was held at Worthing United Reformed Church. In lieu of flowers, donations were request for the '"Margery Davies Memorial Fund" for the "furtherance of Guiding projects".

== Career ==
When Davies established a GP practice in Worthing in 1925, she was the first woman to do so. In 1940 she went into partnership with Olive Burnett. She retired in 1958 but continued to work as a locum and at infant welfare clinics.

== Girl Guides ==
Davies joined the Girl Guide movement in 1925, becoming captain of 13th B Worthing (Seabury School) Guide company. By 1928 she was captain of the 12th Worthing (Congregational) Guide company. In 1938 she started a Sea Ranger crew. Other Guiding roles included acting as Worthing's division camp advisor and as commissioner for District 3 Guides. She resigned as commissioner in 1955 due to workload. From 1959 to 1966 she acted as chairman and recorder for West Sussex Trefoil Guild.

=== Guide International Service (GIS) ===
In 1944 Davies joined the Guide International Service (GIS), which had been established two years previously with the aim of sending teams of adult Girl Guides into Europe after World War II to aid with relief work. The following year Davies joined only the second GIS team to travel to post-war Europe. The team included 22 Guide leaders (including Mollie Walter also from Worthing) and five Scout leaders. The team leader was Australian Meredith Ross. In March 1945, just before leaving, they were "entertained by the Queen in the drawing room at Buckingham Palace."

The team worked in Tilburg, where they set up a hospital, briefly in 's-Heerenberg and then at Belsen concentration camp, Germany, where Davies oversaw a staff of German doctors and nurses. Most of the patients displaced people (DPs) were suffering from typhus, famine oedema or tuberculosis. She returned to Worthing in July 1945 and would give talks about her work and the ongoing need for support of DPs.

== Other ==
- Worthing National Council of Women and Women Citizens' Association, executive council member
- Women's League of Health and Beauty, member
- St Monica's Home for Illegitimate Children and Unmarried Mothers, honorary professional advisor
