= Frances Kingsley =

British biographer

- Born: Frances Eliza Grenfell; 1814; Taplow House, Maidenhead
- Died: 12 December 1891 (aged 76–77) near Leamington Spa
- Other name: "Fanny"
- Occupation: Biographer
- Spouse: Charles Kingsley
- Children: 4

Frances Eliza Kingsley (née Grenfell ; 1814 – 12 December 1891) was a British biographer of her husband Charles Kingsley.

== Life ==
Kingsley was born in 1814, in Taplow House near Maidenhead. Her father was the businessman and politician Pascoe Grenfell, and her mother, Pascoe's second wife, was the Honourable Georgiana St Leger, daughter of St Leger St Leger, 1st Viscount Doneraile. Frances was born into a large family that included six elder sisters. Her mother died when she was a child in 1818 and like her sisters she was educated at home. Her eldest brother Pascoe St Leger Grenfell continued her father's business in Swansea and helped found South Australia and his son, Francis Wallace Grenfell, was a Field Marshal.

When she was in her twenties the idea of entering a religious sisterhood was discussed between herself and three of her sisters. All four of them had been educated at home. Frances was well-read and they all had a religious Catholic interest which followed the Oxford Movement. Her father had died in 1838 and her half brother became head of the family. The four of them were attracted by a movement to reestablish nuns within the Anglican denomination. Frances abandoned these thoughts after she met Charles Kingsley on 6 July 1839. She was six years younger than him and her half-brother, Charles and her family, did not approve of this unconventional Oxford undergraduate.

She married Charles in the town of Bath on 10 January 1844 although she thought that they were married spiritually in 1839. Although she encouraged Charles to enter the church it is clear from their letters that celibacy was not a high priority.

Her husband was employed in Dorset and he became the curate of Eversley in Hampshire and this enabled then to live together. In time he became the rector. In 1850 her husband published Alton Locke and she is thought to be the basis for the character of Eleanor in the book.

In 1869 she listened at a meeting on women's suffrage with her husband, but she was usually based at home because of ill-health and their family.

Her husband died in 1875 and he was buried at Eversley. A memorial was unveiled at Westminster Abbey in 1876, which was where Charles could have been buried. She worked on his biography which was published as Charles Kingsley: His Letters and Memories of His Life in London and in New York in 1877.

In 1884 her eldest daughter Rose started a school for girls in Leamington Spa that is now called The Kingsley School.

She died in Tachbrook Mallory House in 1891.

== Private life ==
She and Charles had four children.
