= Hilary Miller (artist) =

British artist

Hilary Margaret Miller
- Born: 1919; London, England
- Died: 1993 (aged 73–74); Oxfordshire. England
- Education: Blackheath School of Art; Royal College of Art
- Known for: Painting, illustration
- Spouse: Hubert Hennes

Hilary Margaret Miller later Hilary Hennes (1919–1993) was a British artist and illustrator.

== Biography ==
Miller was born in London, where her father was a curator at the South London Art Gallery. She attended Blackheath High School and, from 1936 to 1940, studied at the Blackheath School of Art and then for a further three years at the Royal College of Art. After graduating, Miller taught at the South East Sussex Technical College and in 1946 married the artist Hubert Hennes. The couple set up home in Oxford, where they both held teaching posts at the Oxford School of Art. Between 1948 and 1967 Miller frequently exhibited paintings at the Royal Academy in London and also illustrated a number of books on gardening and natural history, such as The Living World and Boff's Book of Gardening.
