= Death of Charlotte Shaw =

- Charlotte Shaw
- Date: 4 March 2007
- Location: Dartmoor, Devon, United Kingdom
- Outcome: Narrative verdict

Charlotte Shaw was a fourteen-year-old British schoolgirl who drowned while crossing a swollen stream on Dartmoor during training for Ten Tors in 2007. Her death, the first to occur in connection with Ten Tors or one of its training expeditions, made national news headlines in the United Kingdom. She was with a group of students from Edgehill College trekking the route of Ten Tors in training for the main event when the group got into difficulties crossing a stream. Shaw slipped into the water and was washed downstream. She was located 20 minutes later by a Royal Navy search and rescue helicopter and airlifted to Derriford Hospital in Plymouth, where she died in the early hours of the next morning.

A police investigation concluded that nobody should be held criminally responsible for Shaw's death. The investigation was later criticised by the coroner, who adjourned the inquest and recommended that the Crown Prosecution Service (CPS) reconsider the possibility of criminal charges. Three months later, however, the CPS reported that there was insufficient evidence to press charges and the inquest was resumed. After hearing testimony from eyewitnesses, including other members of Shaw's group, the inquest concluded with a narrative verdict in October 2010. In addition to the verdict, the coroner gave several recommendations for future activities of a similar nature. Among the recommendations were suggestions that both participants and the adult "team leaders" should receive better training.

On the same day Shaw died, 26 other participants had to be airlifted from the moor. The British Army, which organises Ten Tors, initially stated that the 2007 event would proceed as planned. However, in the light of severe weather and Shaw's death, it was abandoned halfway through. The rules for the event were modified before the 2007 event to allow teams to carry a mobile telephone for use in case of an emergency.

== Background ==
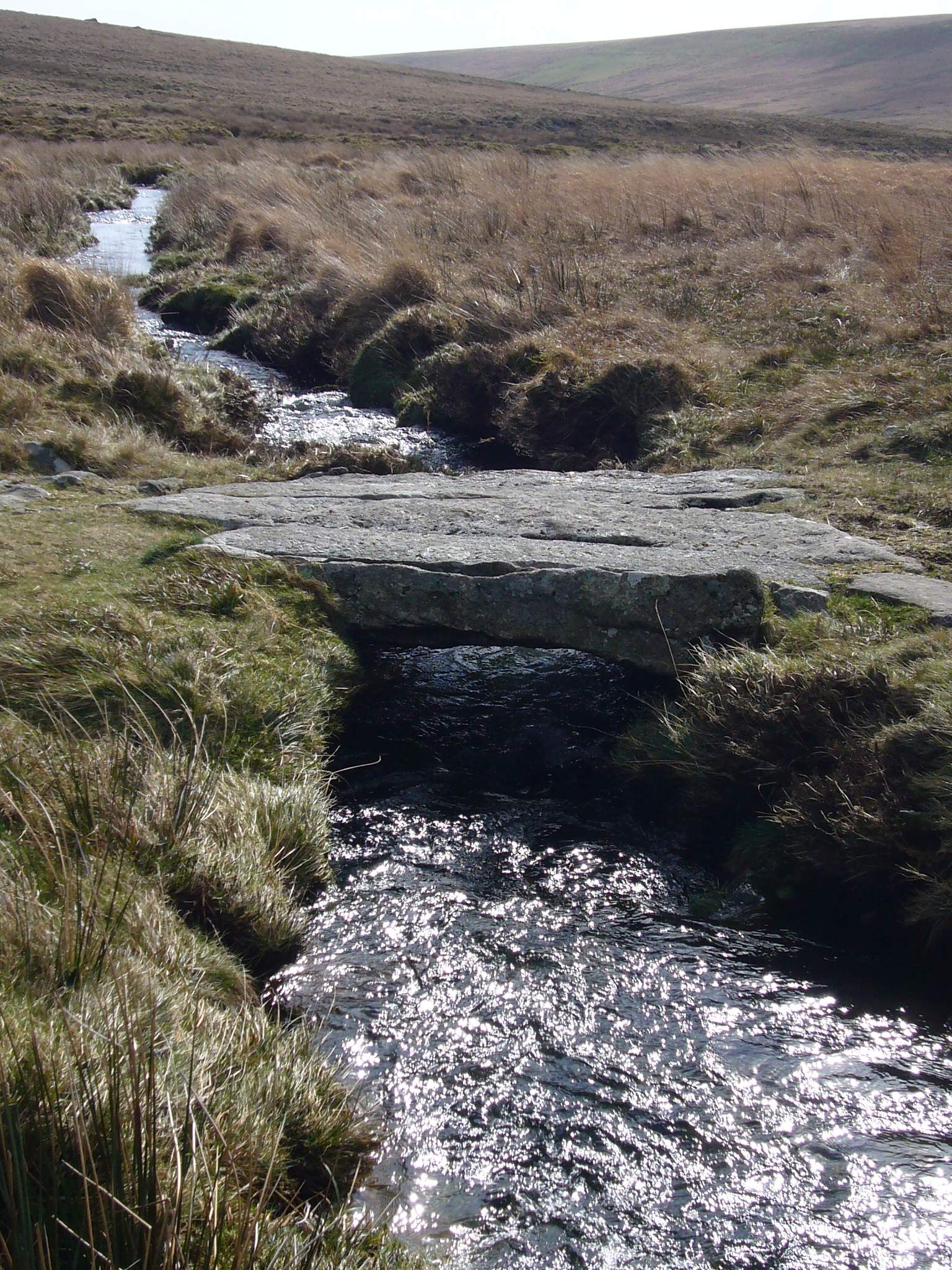
Walla Brook, in which Shaw drowned, at its normal water level

Ten Tors is an annual event organised by the British Army in which groups of young people, between the ages of 14 and 20, trek a route of 35, 45 or 55 miles (depending on the age of the participant) across Dartmoor. The event started in 1960 with just over 200 teenagers taking part and has grown to include 2,400 teenagers from schools and youth organisations, mostly from the United Kingdom. The number of participants is capped at 2,400—400 groups of six—to minimise damage to the environment caused by the event. Participants start from the British Army training camp at Okehampton and are required to carry all their supplies for the trek and spend one night in a tent on the moor. Shaw's group, on a training expedition with dozens of other groups ahead of the main event, was accompanied by a teacher from Edgehill College designated the "team manager". All team managers undergo compulsory training, run by the Army and the Dartmoor Rescue Group, which involves trekking the route themselves.

Charlotte Shaw was a 14-year-old from Frithelstock, near Great Torrington, Devon. She was a student at Edgehill College, Bideford (after a merger in 2009, now Kingsley School, Bideford), where she was involved in various sporting activities run by the school, including captaining its netball and gymnastics teams. Shortly after Shaw's death was announced, the school released a statement in which it said "We are all shocked by the tragedy. [Shaw] was a delightful member of our school community". Shaw was part of a group of 10 students from Edgehill who, along with 84 other groups, were training on 4 March 2007 for Ten Tors, which is held every May. Her death is believed to be the first to occur during, or training for, Ten Tors.

Dartmoor is notorious for its rapidly changeable weather. There had been heavy rain in the 12 hours prior to the accident, causing rivers and streams on Dartmoor to swell much higher than their normal levels. On the same day, 26 other teenagers had to be airlifted from the moor due to the adverse weather.

== Death ==
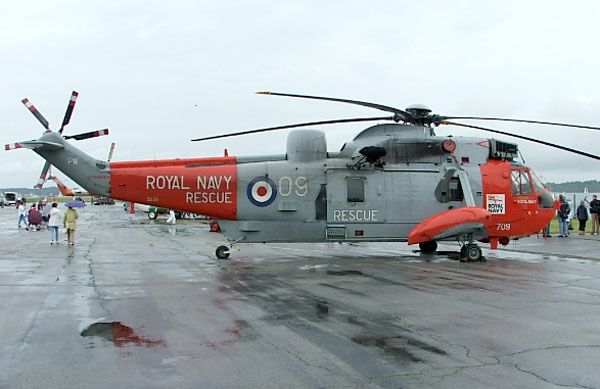
A Royal Navy search and rescue Sea King, similar to the one used in the rescue operation

During the training expedition, Shaw's group came to Walla Brook at a crossing near Watern Tor in the north-east of Dartmoor. According to evidence given at Shaw's inquest in 2009, the group believed they had to cross because the alternative route would add at least four miles to the trek. Another member of the group got into difficulties crossing the stream, which, due to heavy rain, had swollen to approximately five times its normal size. The other group member removed her rucksack and passed it to Shaw. As Shaw, the last member of the group on her side of the stream, was throwing the rucksack across, she slipped and fell into the water.

Shaw was knocked unconscious and swept downstream. A third member of the group raised the alarm by mobile telephone by 14:05 (GMT), less than five minutes after Shaw had been swept away, and Devon and Cornwall Police, a Royal Navy helicopter and the Dartmoor Rescue Group were mobilised to search for Shaw. Believing that the weather conditions may be too bad for the helicopter to fly, members of the Dartmoor Rescue Group—a volunteer organisation which co-ordinates the four separate charities who undertake search and rescue operations on Dartmoor—set out on foot in an attempt to reach the scene of the accident.

Shaw was found by the Royal Navy helicopter, approximately 20 minutes after the alarm was raised, 150 metres downstream from where she had fallen in. Due to poor visibility as a result of heavy rain, the other members of her group had been unable to see her from where they were standing. There were two adults in the group. A member of the helicopter crew explained: "There were two people waving their jackets and pointing into the river. Initially we thought 'Why are they not in the water helping?' what looked like a child face down in the water. Seeing the fast-flowing river, and how dangerous it would have been for them, there was no alternative for them to wait for us to arrive."

The helicopter, from RNAS Culdrose, airlifted Shaw to Derriford Hospital in Plymouth, but she died in the early of hours of 5 March. The cause of death was later established as cardiac arrest as a result of drowning.

== Aftermath ==
Devon and Cornwall Police launched an investigation into the accident, saying in a statement, "There is absolutely no suggestion at all of wrongdoing. The police are here to fully investigate the circumstances and report them to the coroner." An inquest was opened and, three weeks later, the police investigation concluded that nobody should face criminal charges as a result of the accident. Shaw's funeral was held in Bideford Methodist Church on 21 March 2007 and was attended by hundreds of mourners.

The Army said in a statement that it had no plans to cancel the 2007 Ten Tors event; however, the event was abandoned halfway through due to "deteriorating weather conditions". A spokesman for the Dartmoor Rescue Group said that Shaw's death, which occurred in similar conditions, was a factor in the decision. For the first time, participants were allowed to carry one mobile telephone per group for use in an emergency. The Edgehill College team had been given special dispensation to enter a larger-than-normal team for the event in order to allow all the participants of the expedition on which Shaw died to take part. In light of Shaw's death, the North Dartmoor Search and Rescue Team, one of four teams working under the umbrella organisation Dartmoor Rescue Group, developed a capability to conduct rescues from fast-flowing water, known as "swift-water" rescues.

== Inquest ==
An inquest into Shaw's death commenced in Exeter shortly after her death was reported to the coroner. The inquest heard evidence in late 2009, among which was eyewitness testimony that the team manager, a teacher from Edgehill College, had met with the group the morning of Shaw's death. During the meeting, the group asked to end the training hike early, but they were instructed by the teacher to carry on. However, the group's navigator gave evidence that she and Shaw had been happy to continue the expedition. The possibility was also raised by other group members that the group was under-prepared for the conditions they faced. The group member whose bag Shaw had been attempting to throw across the stream told the coroner "We were not told how to cross swollen rivers. We were told how to check how deep it was but we were never told how to cross them. Nobody ever talked to us about using ropes".

The inquest was adjourned in December 2010, as the coroner, Elizabeth Earland, recommended that the Crown Prosecution Service (CPS) reconsider criminal charges in the case. The CPS completed its review in April 2010 and concluded that there was insufficient evidence to pursue a criminal case. Devon and Cornwall Police were criticised by the coroner for their handling of the investigation, particularly regarding contradictory testimony by eyewitnesses. The force voluntarily referred the case to the Independent Police Complaints Commission (IPCC) after the coroner's comments in December 2009, but, in January 2010, the IPCC decided not to open its own inquiry. A solicitor representing Shaw's family said in a statement that "No-one wanted criminal proceedings", but indicated that the family planned to take civil proceedings against Edgehill College for negligence.

The inquest concluded in October 2010. Earland, the Exeter and Greater Devon Coroner, recorded a narrative verdict and came up with several recommendations. Among the recommendations were that Ten Tors participants should undergo more than two training expeditions prior to the main event, that the team managers attain recognised qualifications and that the Health and Safety Executive ensure that independent schools adhere to the same safety standards as state schools. She went on to say that "It would be a tragedy if [Ten Tors] was to stop but the public need to be satisfied it is as safe as it reasonably can be, bearing in mind it is what it says, a challenge, not a survival exercise." After the inquest, Shaw's mother stated that she had been helped by the inquest, saying "I have found out the facts and I'm grateful for that but I am still looking for accountability and some kind of apology and acknowledgement".

Charlotte Shaw's mother subsequently sued Edgehill College and the teacher leading the expedition for negligence. The judgement given on 28 June 2012 found that the teacher had given clear instructions that the group should not attempt to cross Walla Brook but should instead go round it. It further found that the intervention of a passerby, who suggested that the group could cross the brook, had meant that the school could not be held responsible for the accident. It said that the failure of two teachers to meet up with the group as planned was not incompetence. The judge therefore rejected the claim.

In April 2013, Shaw's mother lost her appeal for damages against the school.

There is now a statue in her former school commemorating her.
