= Sarah Allen Olney =

British headmistress (1842–1915)

- Born: 12 May 1842; Saltash, Cornwall, England
- Died: 10 September 1915 (aged 73); Ormea, Italy
- Known for: Headteacher

Sarah Allen Olney (12 May 1842 – 10 September 1915) was a British headmistress. She was the founding head at two schools. She was first head of Blackheath High School and she left there to join with her sister, Rebecca Olney, to create "The Eves".

== Life ==
Olney was born in Saltash. She was one of at least six children. Her parents were Jane Ann (born Carpenter) and Henry Allen Olney. Her father was a solicitor and her mother owned a private school in the west of England. She had a talent for languages which was assisted by her European travels. When she was back in Britain she passed the University of St Andrews's higher local examinations and the external LLA examination.

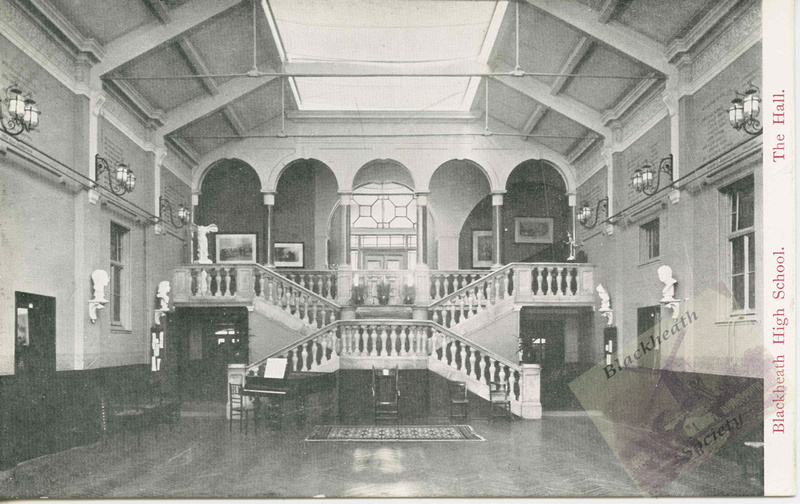
Blackheath High School's hall (in 1896)

Her sister Rebecca was employed as a headmistress at St John's Wood by the Girls' Public Day School Company (GPDSC) and in 1879 they employed Sarah as her assistant head teacher. When the GPDSC opened another school in Blackheath in 1880 Sarah was appointed as head of that school. She joined other GPDSC notable head teachers Mary Alger, Harriet Morant Jones, Dorinda Neligan and Ada Benson. Her school opened with just under 70 pupils and in the next six years the school's role increased to over 250. Sarah, Rebecca (sometimes called Rita) and the GPDSC were allowing girls to receive a good education. The Olneys were amongst the thousands who signed their support for women's suffrage when parliament was petitioned in 1885.

In 1886 Sarah and Rebecca decided to start a more exclusive school which they named "The Elms". Sarah was replaced as head by Florence Gadesden. It was based in Hampstead and Sarah was the head teacher. The school attracted pupils from the nearby GPDSC school which "burnt their bridges" with their previous employers. In 1889 the school had a short move to Belsize Park Gardens as two years later the school with its day and boarding students moved to a new building on Crossfield Road "the Hall".

In 1894 she reported to the Bryce Commission who were a looking at education. She spoke on behalf of the Private Schools Association about the advantages of private enterprise who kelp education innovative and competitive. She feared that national education would lead to falling standards. She did note that well to do parents were not keen on their daughters taking exams, but she entered them for exams as they were important.

In 1905 the Olneys school was sold to the Revd. D. H. Marshall, who moved his school there, renaming it the Hall school, and continued the girls' school at Buckland Crescent.

The Olney sisters retired together. Olney died in Ormea in Italy in 1915.
