= The Kingsley School =

Kingsley School

Location
- Beauchamp Hall, Beauchamp Avenue; Leamington Spa, Warwickshire, CV32 5RD; England; 52.2942°N 1.5377°W

Information
- Type: Other Independent School
- Motto: Esse quam videre (be what you seem to be)
- Established: 1884
- Founder: Rose Kingsley
- Local authority: Warwickshire
- Department for Education URN: 125775 Tables
- Headteacher: Peter Bucknall
- Gender: Boys and Girls to 18.
- Age: 3 to 18
- Colour: Blue
- Website: http://www.thekingsleyschool.co.uk

The Kingsley School is an independent day school in Leamington Spa, Warwickshire, England, to the north of the town centre. It traditionally educated girls from 3 to 18, with the co-educational preparatory school also educating boys up to the age of 11. From September 2025 the school began accepting boys into senior school becoming fully co-educational through to 18.

The senior school occupies an adapted and extended Victorian manor house. On the opposite side of the road is the preparatory school. The nearby sixth form centre is self-contained. The playing fields occupy a site on the outskirts of the town. It was founded as a Church of England school, and now accepts pupils of all faiths and of none.

== History ==
The school was founded as Leamington High School as a girls' school in 1884 by Rose Kingsley, daughter of the writers Frances and Charles Kingsley. The founding Girls' Public Day School Company head was Florence Gadesden who was a graduate of Girton College. She moved on after two years, leaving the school well-established.

The school moved to its present site in 1922, and took its present name in 1949.

== Headteachers ==
- 1884–1886: Florence Gadesden
- 1886–1909: Mary Huckwell
- 1909–1916: Anne Loveday
- 1916–1932: Lilias Milroy
- 1932–1961: Dorothy Sweet
- 1961–1977: Nesta Jones
- 1977–1988: Cynthia Fairhurst
- 1988–1997: Margaret Webster
- 1997–2010: Christine Mannion-Watson
- 2010–2020: Heather Owens
- 2020–2022: Christina McCullough
- 2022–December 2023: James Mercer-Kelly
- January 2024–March 2026: Sarah Howling
- March 2026–Present: Peter Bucknall

== Notable former students ==
- Sophie Robinson, interior designer and television presenter
- Priscilla Young, social worker
