= Jessica Fellowes =

English author and freelance journalist

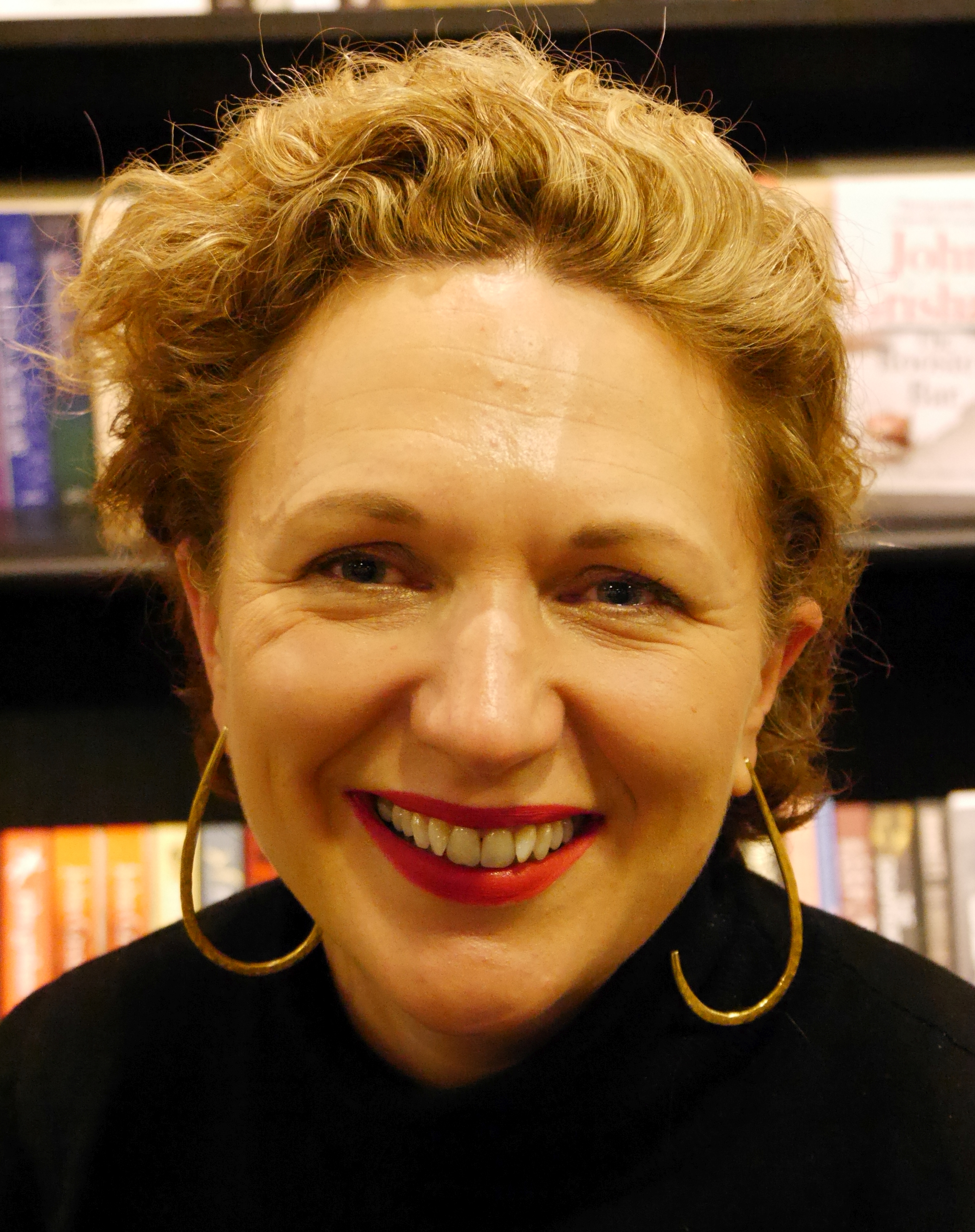
Jessica Fellowes, Hatchards, London, November 2018

Jessica Fellowes (born 1974) is an English author and freelance journalist. She is the niece of Julian Fellowes (Baron Fellowes of West Stafford).

== Career ==
Fellowes was assistant editor of Marketing Business from October 2000 to July 2001; coordinating editor of "Night & Day" for The Mail on Sunday from November 2001 to January 2003; and deputy editor of Country Life magazine from June 2004 until March 2008.

She was a columnist for The London Paper, and also writes for the Daily Telegraph, Telegraph Weekend, Psychologies and The Lady. Her work includes public speaking, celebrity interviewing, and a lifestyle writing.

The Mitford Murders is her debut series as a novelist.

== Books ==
- Mud and the City: Dos and Don'ts for Townies in the Country (2008) Book Guild Publishing ISBN 978-1-84-624278-6
- The Devil You Know: Looking Out for the Psycho in Your Life (2011) with Kerry Daynes, Coronet ISBN 978-1-44-471427-2
- The World of Downton Abbey (2011) Harper Collins, ISBN 978-0-00-743178-6
- The Chronicles of Downton Abbey (2012) Harper Collins, ISBN 978-0-00-745325-2
- A Year in the Life of Downton Abbey: Seasonal Celebrations, Traditions, and Recipes (2014) St. Martin's Press, ISBN 978-1-250-06538-4
- Downton Abbey - A Celebration: The Official Companion to All Six Seasons (2015) St. Martin's Press, ISBN 978-1-250-09155-0
- The Wit and Wisdom of Downton Abbey (2015) St. Martin's Press, ISBN 978-1-250-09360-8
- The Mitford Murders (series)
  - The Mitford Murders (2017)
  - The Mitford Affair (was Bright Young Dead) (2018)
  - The Mitford Scandal (2019)
  - The Mitford Trial (2020)
  - The Mitford Vanishing (2021)
  - The Mitford Secret (2022)
