= Kingsley School Bideford =

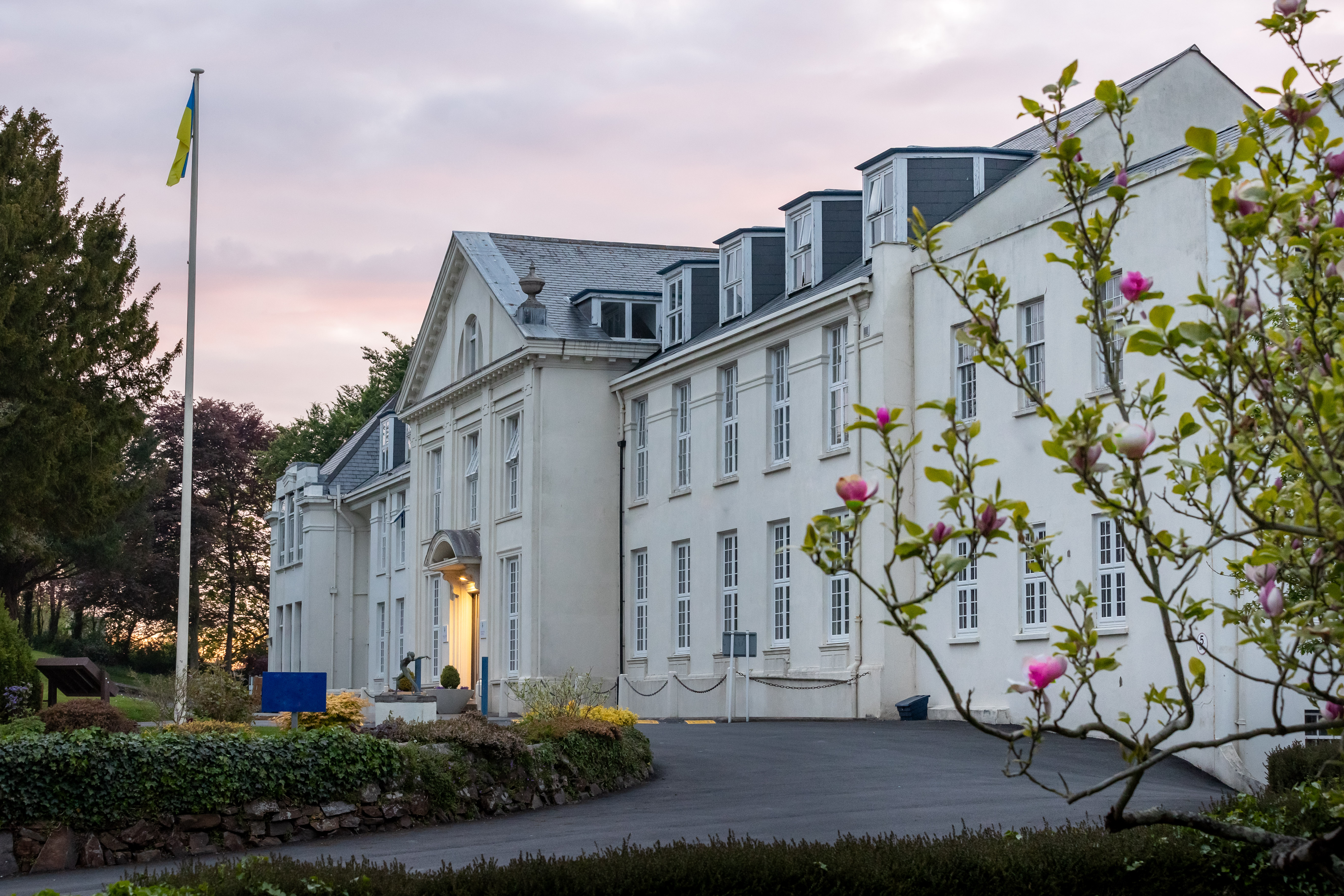
- The main building of Kingsley School Bideford

Location
- Northdown Road; Bideford, Devon, EX39 3JR; United Kingdom; 51.021°N 4.218°W

Information
- Former names: Edgehill College (1884–2009); Stella Maris Convent (1927–1994); Grenville College (1954–2009)
- Type: Private school Boarding school
- Motto: Latin: Deus Honorat Eos Qui Eum Honorant (God Honours Those Who Honour Him)
- Denomination: Methodist
- Established: 1884 (Edgehill College); 1954 (Grenville College); 2009 (current)
- Local authority: Devon
- Department for Education URN: 113604 Tables
- Headmaster: Robert Pavis
- Gender: Co-educational
- Age range: 2–19
- Enrolment: 402
- Capacity: 430
- Area: 29 acres (12 hectares)
- Houses: Putsborough; Croyde; Woolacombe; Saunton
- School fees: £2,090–18,540 per year
- Affiliation: Society of Heads; ISA; AGBIS; ISBA
- Website: kingsleydevon.com
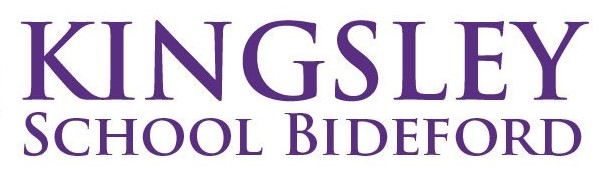

Kingsley School Bideford is a co-educational private day and boarding school in Bideford, Devon, England. The school was founded in 1884 as Edgehill College, and merged with Grenville College in 2009 to form Kingsley.

Alongside Shebbear College and West Buckland School, Kingsley is one of the three main independent schools in North Devon. It enrols up to 430 pupils.

== History ==
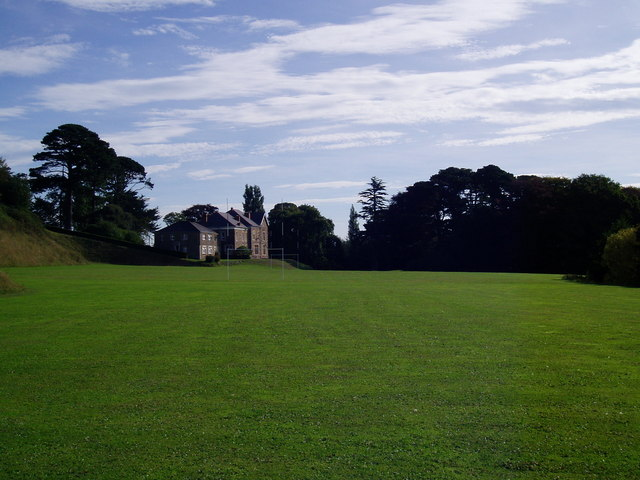
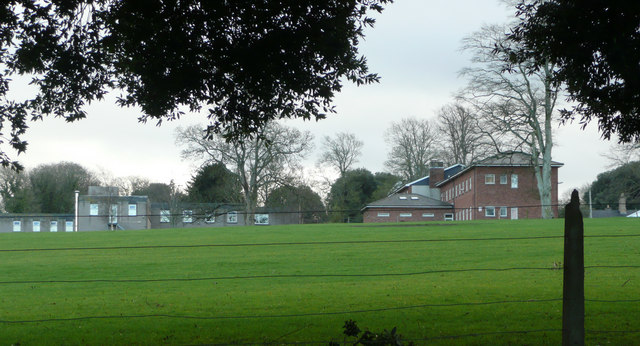
Edgehill (left) and Grenville (right) merged in 2009 to form Kingsley.

Kingsley was established in January 2009 as a merger of Edgehill College and Grenville College. The school's namesake is that of novelist Charles Kingsley, author of the locally-based adventure novel Westward Ho! (1855).

Edgehill College was founded in 1884 by the Methodist Church of Great Britain. Grenville College was founded in 1954 as an Anglican boys' school and in 1994 merged with Stella Maris, a Roman Catholic convent school, becoming co-educational.

On 28 October 2008, it was announced by Methodist Education that the schools would merge in a response to difficulty and pressure placed on maintaining independent education in North Devon. The move was triggered by a fall in pupil numbers at both schools since education reforms in 1997, and by difficult economic circumstances both locally and nationally.

In September 2019, the school was sold by the Methodist Independent Schools Trust (MIST) to KSI Education, a new educational company linked to Hong Kong–based China First Capital Group.

Kingsley divides its students into four houses, competing against one another in sport and academics: Putsborough, Croyde, Woolacombe and Saunton. Each house is named after a coastal resort along the local North Devon Coast AONB.

=== Headmasters ===
The current headmaster is Robert Pavis, having taken over from interim head Alastair Ramsay in February 2022.

- 2022–present: Robert Pavis
- 2021–2022: Alastair Ramsay (interim)
- 2020–2021: Gill Jackson
- 2017–2020: Pete Last
- 2013–2017: Simon Woolcott
- 2009–2013: Andy Waters

== Facilities ==
=== Earth Centre ===
In 2019, Kingsley broke ground on the Earth Centre, an umbrella term for Kingsley's unique commitment to climate action, biodiversity restoration and nutrition from healthy food. Kingsley, located in the UNESCO Biosphere of North Devon, aims to be carbon neutral by 2027.

The new developments will feature a 10,700 square-foot education centre, designed by JB Architects, and on-site ecology zones.

At the 2020 ISA Awards, Kingsley won Sustainability and Environmental Education School of the Year for its commitments to climate action.

=== SEND support ===
The Grenville Dyslexic Centre was founded in 1969 and became one of the leading centres in the UK for maximizing the achievements of dyslexic students.

The current Grenville Centre provides specialist support for senior school students aged between 11 and 16, who have some form of learning difference or special educational needs and disabilities (SEND). The Edgehill Centre provides this service for students aged 6 to 11.

The Stella Maris Centre provides differentiated learning programs for all students with mild to moderate learning differences, offering tailored support for each student according to need.

=== Kingsley Surf Academy ===
Kingsley is located by the North Devon coast, less than 2 miles from Westward Ho! beach, and offers a leading program for students of any experience who wish to excel in surfing. The academy offers both a practical and theoretical approach to better understand the sport of surfing.

== Boarding ==
There are currently two boarding houses available to Senior School pupils:

- Belvoir House – for girls in years 7 to 13.
- Longfield – for boys in years 7 to 13.

Each house has a range of study-bedrooms, bathrooms, kitchen-cafes, a laundry and recreational spaces.

== Incidents ==
=== 2013 Kiltrasna House fire ===
On 30 March 2013, there was a fire at Kiltrasna House, a derelict building on the edge of the school grounds, having previously been a girls' boarding house at Edgehill until September 2003. Devon and Somerset Fire and Rescue Service said the fire "severely damaged" around 70% of the building. There were no injuries.
