= Family Action =

British charitable organization

- Formation: 1869; 157 years ago
- Founders: Octavia Hill, Lord Shaftesbury, William Gladstone, John Ruskin, Cardinal Manning and Beatrice and Sidney Webb
- Founded at: London
- Registration no.: 264713
- Legal status: charity
- Chief Executive: Sir David Holmes CBE
- Website: www.family-action.org.uk
- Formerly called: Family Welfare Association; Charity Organisation Society

Family Action (previously Family Welfare Association and the Charity Organisation Society) is a charity in England founded in 1869. It provides support for families, including financial and mental health issues relating to them.

The stated aim of the charity is to "provid[e] practical, emotional and financial support to those who are experiencing poverty, disadvantage and social isolation across England".

The charity is registered with the Charity Commission as charity number 264713.

== History ==
Family Action was founded in 1869 as the Society for Organising Charitable Relief and Repressing Mendicity, commonly referred to as the Charity Organisation Society (COS). Its original aim was to combine the efforts of various overlapping charities in London, which was felt to lead to discrimination, poverty and waste. The society aimed to properly investigate the circumstances behind any charity claimants, and ensuring that relief should be sufficient to keep them above the poverty line.

The organisation was renamed the Family Welfare Association in 1946 to reflect its family-oriented role. It became Family Action in 2008, because beneficiaries felt 'welfare' had negative connotations.

In 1939 the charity began plans for setting up the first Citizens Advice Bureaux in inner London with the London Council of Social Services. These information centres were to give advice "about the family and personal problems and difficulties which will face people in time of war". The bureaux were to be run by skilled volunteers whose work was recognised as "of essential national importance in time of war" as "soon as the need arises".
