= Edgehill College =

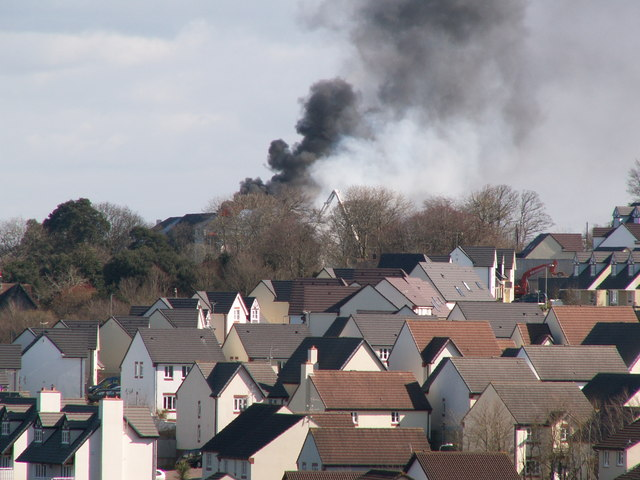
- The fire at the college in 2006

Location
- Northdown Road; Bideford, Devon, EX39 3LY; England
- Coordinates: 51.021°N 4.218°W

Information
- Religious affiliation: Methodist
- Established: 1884
- Closed: 2008
- Local authority: Devon
- Gender: Coeducational
- Age: 1 to 18

Edgehill College was a co-educational independent school located in Bideford, Devon. Founded in 1884 by the Bible Christian movement, Edgehill was one of a number of independent schools owned by the Methodist Church of Great Britain and was sister-school to nearby Shebbear College. It was traditionally the principal girls' independent school in the area, becoming co-educational in 1992. The Preparatory School was always co-educational, with boys boarding at Shawleigh beginning in 1969.

== Houses ==
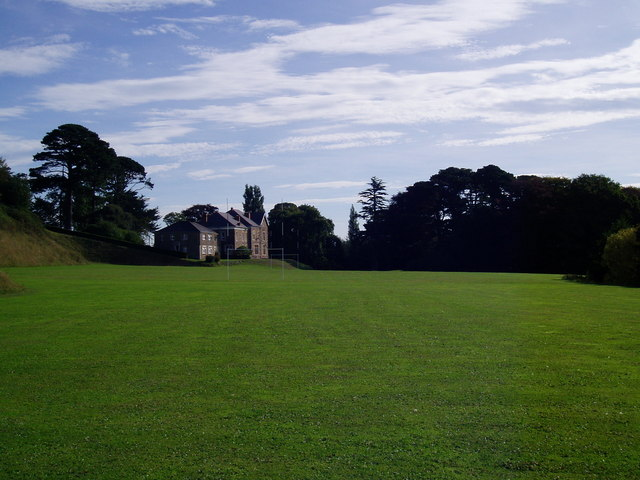
Belvoir House, part of Edgehill College and a Rugby pitch

Pupils were assigned membership to competitive houses on enrolment. Since September 2003 until the school's closure these houses were named after local rivers: Tamar, Taw and Torridge. Prior to this the houses had been called Belvoir, Carisbrooke, Kiltrasna and Longfield, after the boarding houses which all girls were members of. It is also known that four competitive houses were named after famous female authors and these were Austin, Bronte, Elliot and Gaskell, with house colours blue, green, yellow and red, respectively. The competitive houses participated in sporting events as well as three annual inter-house festivals in drama, music, and poetry and public speaking. Before 2001 this system was also the basis of pastoral support with each house having a physical presence with a staff and recreational facilities.

== Incidents ==
In 1994 the college open-air swimming pool was found to be structurally dangerous and slowly sliding down the hill it was located on. It was permanently closed and later demolished. A car park now lies on the former site.

In 2007, Charlotte Shaw, a pupil, died training for Ten Tors, when she fell into a brook on Dartmoor and was swept away.

== Fires ==
In July 1920, a fire was discovered at 3am. Everyone was safely evacuated and although staff initially tackled the blaze, their efforts were halted when the water supply dried up. Further issues with obtaining sufficient water slowed down the efforts of the local fire brigade, meaning that the entire building was completely burnt out in the ensuing inferno.

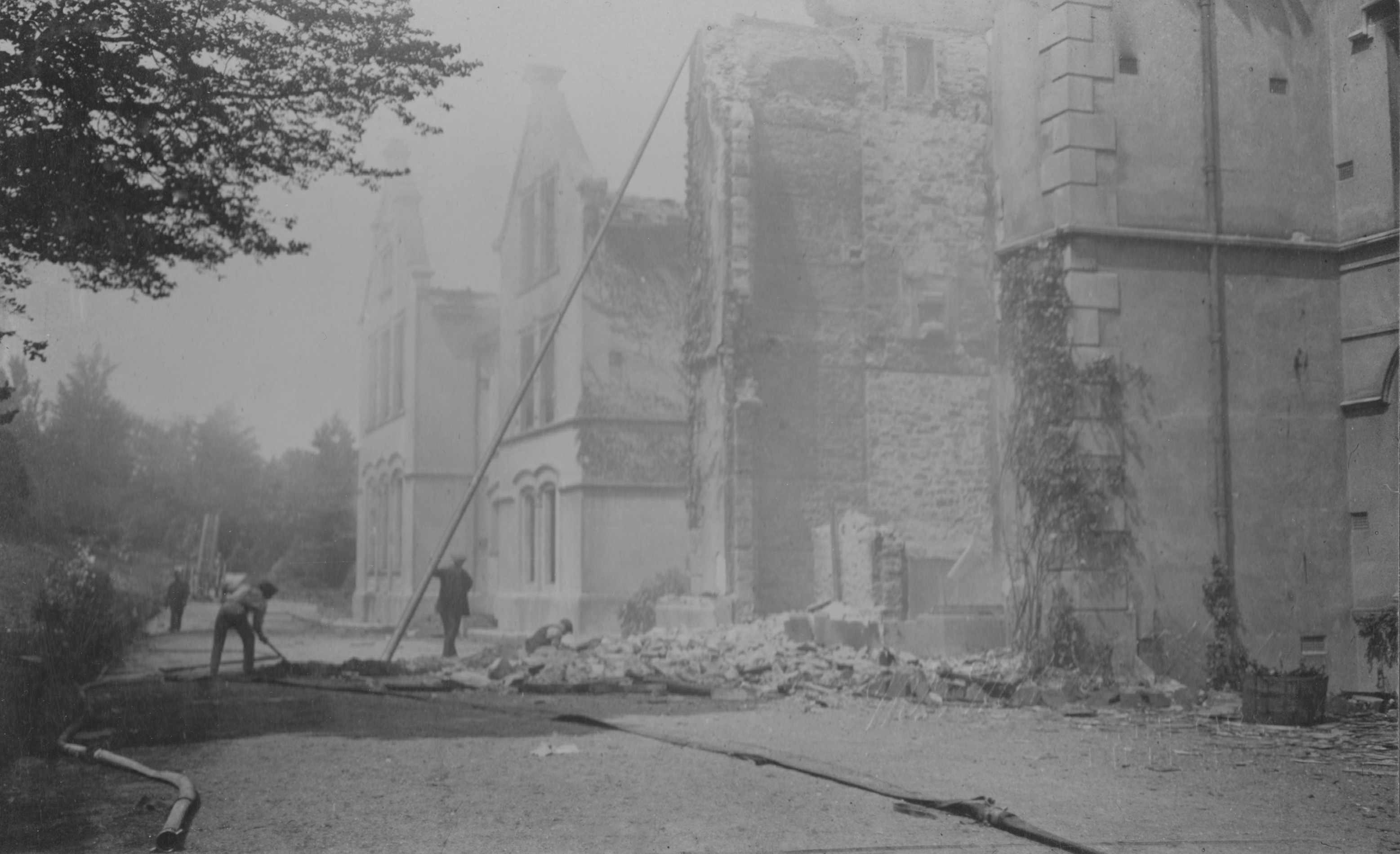
Photograph showing workmen clearing up the morning after Edgehill College, Devon, was burnt out

On 5 March 2006, a fire caused costly damage to the main school. Another fire caused significant damage on 11 May 2008.

A fourth fire largely destroyed Kiltrasna House (derelict since 2005) on 30 March 2013.

== Closure ==
On 28 October 2008 it was announced by Methodist Education that Edgehill College and the neighbouring Woodard School, Grenville College, would merge to become Kingsley School at the beginning of January 2009. This was a response to difficulty and pressure placed on maintaining independent education in north Devon. The move was triggered by a fall in pupil numbers in both schools since education reforms in 1997, and by difficult economic circumstances both locally and nationally.
