= Grenville College =

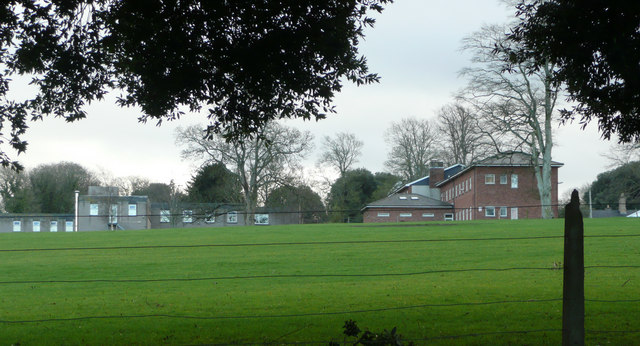

Location
- Belvoir Road; Bideford, Devon; England; 51°01′06″N 4°12′56″W

Information
- Type: Private school
- Religious affiliation: Church of England
- Established: 1954
- Closed: 2009
- Headmaster: Andy Waters
- Gender: Mixed-sex education
- Age: 2½ to 18
- Houses: Atlantic, Exmoor, Lundy, Tarka
- Affiliation: Woodard Corporation
- Website: http://www.grenvillecollege.co.uk/

Grenville College was an independent boarding and day school situated in Bideford, Devon, England. In 2009 the school merged with neighbouring Edgehill College to become the Kingsley School.

== History ==
Grenville College was founded in 1954 as a boys’ school by Messrs O. Dromgoole, B. Spain, and W. G. Scott. Dromgoole was the first headmaster and drew up the initial prospectus. He was succeeded as Headmaster in 1955 by Walter F. Scott. The college is named after the Elizabethan sea captain, Sir Richard Grenville, who came from Bideford. Walter Scott wanted to offer his pupils opportunities which had not been available to him when he had been a pupil at school. This included the setting up of a specialist dyslexia department, which has now been part of Grenville College for 38 years.

In 1965 the school became part of the Woodard Schools foundation, a foundation which aims to help private schools to flourish. In 1994 the College merged with Stella Maris Convent school, becoming a co-educational school and also acquiring a junior school. The former Stella Maris school included the listed buildings Northdown Hall and York House on Northam Road.

Grenville College served over 400 students from 3 to 18 years and was an accredited ISC school in membership of the Secondary Heads of Independent Schools (SHMIS), the Independent Schools' Association (ISA) and the Boarding Schools' Association (BSA).

Edgehill College and Grenville College became Kingsley School at the beginning of January 2009, in a bid to ensure the continuation of independent education in the town. The move was triggered by a fall in pupil numbers in both schools and by the prevalent economic climate; the aim was to provide a strong school of up to 600 pupils with multiple specialisms and strengths. Grenville students moved to their new campus in September 2009. The merger was entirely supported by both the Woodard Board and the Methodist Group. However Kingsley School is only supported by the Methodist Group.

== See also ==
Moreton House, Bideford
