= List of private schools in England =

There are around 2,400 private schools in England. Many are represented by the Independent Schools Council (ISC), while around 300 independent senior schools are represented by the Headmasters' and Headmistresses' Conference (HMC), although both bodies also represent schools outside England and the United Kingdom.

This is a list of notable independent schools in England that are currently operating. It includes independent schools with heads who are members of both organisations and of others. In England and Wales, though not in Scotland or Northern Ireland, independent senior schools are sometimes referred to as public schools, while independent junior schools are sometimes known as prep schools, although both are officially designated by government agencies and their own representative bodies as independent schools.

== A ==
- The Abbey College, Malvern, Worcestershire
- Abbey Gate College
- The Abbey School, Reading
- Abbot's Hill School
- Abbotsford Preparatory School
- Abbotsholme School
- Aberdour School
- Abingdon Preparatory School
- Abingdon School
- Ackworth School
- ACS International Schools (Cobham, Egham and Hillingdon)
- Adcote School
- AKS Lytham, Lytham St. Annes
- Akeley Wood School
- Aldenham School
- Aldwickbury School
- Alleyn Court Prep School
- Alleyn's School, Dulwich
- All Hallows Preparatory School
- The American School In England
- Amesbury School
- Ampleforth College
- Ardingly College
- Argyle House School
- Arnold House School
- Arnold Lodge School
- The Arts Educational School, Tring Park
- The Arts Educational Schools, Chiswick
- Ashbourne College
- Ashdown House
- Ashfold School
- Ashford School
- Ashville College
- Austin Friars St Monica's School
- Ayesha Siddiqa Girls School
- Aysgarth School

== B ==
- Bablake School
- Bancroft's School
- Barlborough Hall School
- Barnard Castle School
- Bassett House School
- Battle Abbey School
- Beaulieu Convent School
- Beaumont School
- Bedales School
- Bedford Girls' School
- Bedford Greenacre Independent School
- Bedford Modern School
- Bedford School
- Beech Hall School
- Beechwood Park School
- Beechwood Sacred Heart School
- Benenden School
- Berkhamsted School
- Bethany School, Goudhurst, Kent
- Birkdale School
- Birkenhead School
- Bishop Stopford's School
- Bishop's Stortford College
- Blackheath High School
- Bloxham School
- Blundell's School
- Bolton School
- Bootham School
- Bosworth Independent College
- Bournemouth Collegiate School
- Bow, Durham School
- Bowbrook House School
- Bradfield College
- Bradford Grammar School
- Bradford Christian School
- Braeside School
- Brambletye School
- Brampton College
- Bredon School
- Brentwood School
- Bridgewater School
- Brighton and Hove High School
- Brighton College
- Brighton College Preparatory School
- Bristol Grammar School
- Bristol Cathedral School
- Brockhurst and Marlston House School
- Bromley High School
- Bromsgrove School
- Bryanston School
- Buckswood School
- Burgess Hill Girls
- Bury Grammar School
- Bute House Preparatory School for Girls

== C ==
- Caldicott School
- Cambridge International School, Cambridge
- Cambridge Steiner School
- Canford School
- Carfax College, Oxford
- Carleton House Preparatory School
- Castle Court School
- Castle House School
- Caterham School
- CATS College Canterbury
- Chafyn Grove School
- Chandlings School
- Channing School
- Chard School
- Charterhouse School
- Charterhouse Square School
- Cheadle Hulme School
- Cheam School
- Cheltenham College
- Cheltenham Ladies College
- Chetham's School of Music, Manchester
- Chetwynde School, Barrow-in-Furness
- Chigwell School
- Chinthurst School
- Christ Church Cathedral School
- Christ's Hospital
- Churcher's College
- City of London Freemen's School
- City of London School
- City of London School for Girls
- Claires Court School
- Claremont Fan Court School
- Clayesmore School
- Clifton College, Bristol
- Clifton High School, Bristol
- Cobham Hall School
- Cokethorpe School
- Colchester High School
- Colfe's School
- Collegiate School, Bristol
- Collingham College
- Combe Bank School
- Copthorne Preparatory School
- Cothill House
- Cottesmore School
- Cranford House School
- Cranleigh School
- Cransley School
- Crosfields School
- Croydon High School
- Culford School

== D ==
- d'Overbroeck's College
- Dame Allan's School, Newcastle
- Danes Hill School, Oxshott, Surrey
- Daneshill School, Stratfield Turgis, Hampshire
- Darul Hadis Latifiah Northwest
- Dauntsey's School
- David Game College, London
- Dean Close School, Cheltenham
- Deepdene School
- Denstone College
- Derby Grammar School
- Derby High School, Derby
- Devonshire House Preparatory School
- Ditcham Park School
- Dixie Grammar School
- Dolphin School
- Dorset House School
- Donhead Preparatory School
- Dover College
- Downe House School
- Downsend School
- Downside School
- Dragon School
- Duke of Kent School
- Duke of York's Royal Military School
- Dulwich College
- Dulwich College Preparatory School
- Dulwich Preparatory School
- Dumpton School
- Dunottar School
- Durham School
- Durston House
- Dwight School

== E ==
- Eagle House School
- Ealing Independent College
- Eastbourne College
- Eaton Square Upper School
- Edge Grove School
- Edgeborough School
- EF Academy
- Egerton Rothesay School
- EIFA International School London
- Ellesmere College
- Elmhurst School, Croydon
- Elmhurst Ballet School, Edgbaston
- Elstree School
- Eltham College
- Emanuel School
- Emmanuel Christian School, Oxford
- Embley
- Epsom College
- Eton College
- Ewell Castle School
- Exeter School
- Exeter Cathedral School

== F ==
- Farleigh School
- Farlington School
- Farnborough Hill
- Felsted School
- Feltonfleet School
- Finborough School
- Finton House School
- Forest School
- Framlingham College
- Francis Holland School
- Frensham Heights School
- Fulham Preparatory School
- Fyling Hall School

== G ==
- Gad's Hill School
- Garden House School
- Gatehouse School
- Gateways School
- Gayhurst School
- German School London
- Giggleswick School
- Glebe House School
- Glendower Preparatory School
- Godolphin School
- Godolphin and Latymer School
- Gosfield School
- Grange Park Preparatory School
- The Grange School, Northwich
- Grangewood Independent School
- Grammar School at Leeds
- Great Ballard School, Chichester
- Great Walstead School
- Greenfields School
- The Gregg School
- Gresham's School
- Guildford High School

== H ==
- Haberdashers' Boys' School
- Haberdashers' School for Girls
- Haileybury College
- Halliford School
- The Hall School, Hampstead
- Hall School Wimbledon
- The Hammond School
- Hampton Court House
- Hampton School
- Handcross Park School
- Hanford School
- The Harrodian School
- Harrogate Ladies' College
- Harrogate Tutorial College
- Harrow School
- Hazelwood School
- Headington School
- Heathcote School
- Heathfield Knoll School
- Heathfield School, Ascot
- Heath Mount School
- Hereford Cathedral Junior School
- Hereford Cathedral School
- Hereward House School
- Highclare School
- Highfield Priory School
- Highgate School
- Hill House School
- Hipperholme Grammar School
- Hoe Bridge School
- Holland House School
- Hollygirt School
- Holmewood House School
- Holy Cross Preparatory School
- Horris Hill School
- Huddersfield Grammar School
- Hull Collegiate School
- Hulme Grammar School, Oldham
- Hurstpierpoint College
- Hurtwood House
- Hymers College, Hull

== I ==
- Ibstock Place School, Roehampton, London
- International Community School
- Ipswich High School
- Ipswich School
- Italia Conti Academy of Theatre Arts

== J ==
- James Allen's Girls' School, Dulwich
- Jamiatul Ilm Wal Huda
- Japanese School in London
- John Lyon School, Harrow

== K ==
- Keble School
- Kensington Park School
- Kensington Preparatory School
- Kent College, Canterbury
- Kent College, Pembury
- Kew College
- Kew Green Preparatory School
- Kimbolton School
- Kimichi School
- King Alfred School, London
- King Edward VI School, Southampton
- King Edward's School, Bath
- King Edward's School, Birmingham
- King Edward VI High School for Girls, Birmingham
- King Edward's School, Godalming
- Kingham Hill School
- King Henry VIII Preparatory School
- King Henry VIII School, Coventry
- King's College School, Cambridge
- King's College School, Wimbledon
- King's College, Taunton
- King's Hall School
- Kingshott School
- The King's High School for Girls, Warwick
- King's House School
- King's School, Bruton
- The King's School, Canterbury
- The King's School, Chester
- King's Ely
- The King's School, Gloucester
- The King's School, Macclesfield
- The King's School, Rochester
- The King's School, Witney
- The King's School, Worcester
- Kingsley School, Bideford
- The Kingsley School, Leamington Spa
- Kingston Grammar School
- Kingswood House School
- Kingswood School
- Kirkham Grammar School
- Kirkstone House School
- Knighton House
- Knightsbridge School

== L ==
- Lady Barn House School
- Lady Eleanor Holles School
- Lancing College
- Langley School, Loddon
- Latymer Upper School
- Lambrook
- The Laurels School
- Leehurst Swan School
- Leicester Grammar School
- Leicester High School for Girls
- Leighton Park School
- Lewes Old Grammar School
- Leweston School
- The Leys School, Cambridge
- Licensed Victuallers' School
- Lichfield Cathedral School
- Lincoln Minster School
- Lingfield College
- Lockers Park School
- Long Close School
- Longridge Towers School
- Lord Wandsworth College
- Loreto Preparatory School
- Loughborough Grammar School
- Loughborough High School
- Luckley House School
- Lucton School
- Ludgrove School
- Lycée Français Charles de Gaulle
- Lycée International de Londres Winston Churchill

== M ==
- Madani Girls' School
- Magdalen College School, Oxford
- The Mall School
- Malvern College
- Malvern St James
- Manchester Grammar School
- Manchester High School for Girls
- Mander Portman Woodward
- Manor House School, Little Bookham, Surrey
- Manor Lodge School
- The Marist School, Sunninghill
- Marlborough College
- Marlborough House School
- Marymount International School, Kingston-Upon-Thames
- Mayfield School, Mayfield, East Sussex
- The Maynard School, Exeter
- Mayville High School
- Meoncross School
- Merchant Taylors' School, Northwood
- Merchant Taylors' Girls' School
- Merchant Taylors' School, Crosby
- Michael Hall School
- Milbourne Lodge School
- Mill Hill School
- Millfield
- Millfield Preparatory School
- Milton Abbey School
- Monkton Combe School
- Moorland School
- Moor Park School
- Moreton Hall School
- Moreton Hall Preparatory School
- Mount Kelly School
- The Mount School, York
- Mowden Hall School
- Moyles Court School

== N ==
- New College School
- Newbold College
- Newcastle High School for Girls
- Newcastle School for Boys
- Newcastle-under-Lyme School
- New Hall School
- Newland House School
- Newton Preparatory School
- Norland Place School
- Normanhurst School
- North Bridge House School
- North Cestrian Grammar School, Altrincham, Greater Manchester
- North London Collegiate School
- North London Grammar School
- Northampton High School
- Northwood College
- Norwich High School for Girls
- Norwich School
- Notre Dame School, Surrey
- Nottingham High School
- Nottingham Girls' High School
- Notting Hill & Ealing High School

== O ==
- Oakfield Preparatory School
- Oakham School
- Oakhill School, Whalley
- Oaklands School, Loughton, Essex
- Old Buckenham Hall School
- The Oratory School
- Orley Farm School
- Oswestry School
- Oundle School
- Our Lady of Sion School
- Overstone Park School
- Oxford High School
- Oxford Montessori Schools

== P ==
- Packwood Haugh School
- Palmers Green High School
- Pangbourne College
- Papplewick School
- Pardes House Grammar School
- Pattison College
- Pembridge Hall School
- Pennthorpe School
- Perrott Hill School
- The Perse Preparatory School
- The Perse School
- The Perse School for Girls
- The Peterborough School
- The Pilgrims' School, Winchester
- Pipers Corner School
- Pitsford School
- Plymouth College
- Pocklington School
- Polwhele House School
- Port Regis School
- Portsmouth Grammar School
- Portsmouth High School
- The Prebendal School
- Prestfelde School
- Princethorpe College
- Prior Park College
- Prior's Field School
- Priory School, Isle of Wight
- Purcell School
- Putney High School

== Q ==
- Queen Anne's School
- Queen Elizabeth Grammar School, Wakefield
- Queen Elizabeth's Hospital, Bristol
- Queen Ethelburga's Collegiate
- Queen Mary's School
- Queen's College, London
- Queen's College, Taunton
- Queen's Gate School, London
- Queenswood School
- The Queen's School, Chester
- Quinton House School

== R ==
- Radley College
- Ratcliffe College
- Read School, Drax, North Yorkshire
- Reading Blue Coat School
- Red House School
- Redmaids' High School
- Redroofs Theatre School
- Reed's School
- Regent Independent College
- Reigate Grammar School
- Rendcomb College
- Repton Prep
- Repton School
- RGS Dodderhill
- RGS Surrey Hills
- RGS The Grange, Worcester
- Rikkyo School in England
- Ringwood Waldorf School
- Ripley Court School
- River School
- Rishworth School
- Rochester Independent College
- Roedean School
- Rokeby Preparatory School
- Rookwood School
- Rose Hill School
- Rossall School, Fleetwood
- Royal Ballet School
- Royal Grammar School, Guildford
- Royal Grammar School, Newcastle upon Tyne
- Royal Grammar School, Worcester
- Royal High School, Bath
- Royal Hospital School
- The Royal Masonic School for Girls
- Royal Russell School
- Rudston Preparatory School
- Rugby School
- Rupert House School
- Ryde School With Upper Chine
- Rye St Antony School

== S ==
- Sackville School, Hildenborough
- Salesian College, Farnborough
- St Albans High School for Girls
- St. Albans School
- St Andrew's College, Cambridge
- St Andrew's School, Pangbourne
- St Andrew's School (Wantage)
- St Annes College Grammar School, Lytham St. Annes
- St Anselm's School, Bakewell
- St Anthony's School, Hampstead
- St Aubyn's School, Woodford Green, London
- St Augustine's Priory School
- St Bede's Prep School, Eastbourne
- St Bees School, St Bees
- St Benedict's School, London
- St Catherine's School, Bramley
- St Catherine's School, Twickenham
- St Christopher School, Letchworth
- St. Clare's, Oxford
- St Columba's College, St Albans
- St Dominic's Grammar School, Brewood
- St Dominic's Priory School, Stone
- St Dunstan's College
- St Edmund's School, Canterbury
- St Edmund's School, Hindhead
- St Edmund's College
- St Edward's School, Cheltenham
- St Edward's School, Oxford
- St Faith's School
- Saint Felix School
- St Francis' College, Letchworth
- St Gabriel's School
- St George's College, Weybridge
- St George's School, Ascot
- St George's School, Birmingham
- St George's School, Windsor
- St. Helen's School
- St Hilary's School, Godalming
- St. Hilda's School, Bushey
- St Hugh's School, Faringdon, Oxfordshire
- St Hugh's School, Woodhall Spa
- St James Independent Schools
- St James' School, Grimsby
- St John's Beaumont School
- St John's College School
- St John's School, Billericay
- St John's School, Leatherhead
- St Joseph's College, Ipswich
- St Joseph's College, Reading
- St Joseph's In The Park
- St Lawrence College, Ramsgate
- St Margaret's School, Bushey
- St Margaret's School Hampstead
- St Martha's Senior School
- St Martin's School, Northwood
- St Martin's School, St Martin's, Shropshire
- St Mary's Ascot
- St Mary's College, Crosby
- St Mary's School, Calne
- St Mary's School, Cambridge
- St Mary's School, Colchester
- St Mary's School, Gerrards Cross, Buckinghamshire
- St Michael's Preparatory School, Otford, North Downs
- Saint Nicholas School, Old Harlow, Essex
- St Nicholas' School, Hampshire
- St Olave's School, York
- St Paul's Girls School
- St Paul's Juniors
- St Paul's
- St Peter's School, Kettering
- St Peter's School, York
- St Swithun's School, Winchester
- St Teresa's School Effingham, Surrey
- St Wilfrid's School, Exeter
- Salcombe Preparatory School
- Salesian College
- Salisbury Cathedral School
- Sancton Wood School
- Sandroyd School
- Sands School
- Scarborough College
- Scarisbrick Hall School
- The School of St Helen and St Katharine
- The School of the Lion, Churcham, Gloucestershire
- Seaford College
- Sedbergh School
- Sevenoaks School
- Shebbear College
- Sheffield High School
- Sherborne House School
- Sherborne Preparatory School
- Sherborne School
- Sherborne School For Girls
- Sherfield School
- Sherrardswood School, Welwyn
- Shiplake College
- Shoreham College
- Shrewsbury High School
- Shrewsbury House School
- Shrewsbury School
- Sibford School
- Sidcot School
- Silcoates School
- Sir William Perkins's School
- Solihull School
- South Hampstead High School
- Southbank International School
- Spratton Hall School
- Stafford Grammar School
- Staines Preparatory School
- Stamford School
- Stanborough School, Watford
- Stella Maris School
- Stockport Grammar School
- Stoke College
- Stonar School
- Stonyhurst College
- Stonyhurst Saint Mary's Hall
- Stowe School
- Streatham Hill & Clapham High School
- Summer Fields School
- Summerhill School
- Sunningdale School
- Surbiton High School
- Susi Earnshaw Theatre School
- Sussex House School
- Sutton High School
- Sutton Valence School
- The Swedish School in London
- Sydenham High School
- Sylvia Young Theatre School

== T ==
- Talbot Heath School
- Tawhid Boys School
- Tayyibah Girls' School
- Taunton School
- Teesside High School, Stockton-on-Tees
- Teikyo School United Kingdom
- Terra Nova School
- Tettenhall College
- Thetford Grammar School
- Thomas's London Day School
- Thorpe Hall School
- Tonbridge School
- Tormead School
- Tower College
- Tower House School
- Town Close House Preparatory School
- Trent College
- Tring Park School for the Performing Arts
- Trinity School (of John Whitgift)
- Trinity School, Teignmouth, Devon
- Truro High School
- Truro School
- Tudor Hall School
- Twyford School

== U ==
- University College School
- Uppingham School
- Ursuline Preparatory School

== V ==
- Vernon Lodge Preparatory School
- Verulam School
- Vinehall School

== W ==
- Wakefield Girls' High School
- Walhampton School
- Walthamstow Hall
- Warminster School
- Warwick School
- Wellesley House School
- Wellingborough School
- Wellington College
- Wellington School, Somerset
- Wells Cathedral School
- West Buckland School
- West Hill Park School
- Westbourne House School
- Westbourne School
- Westbrook Hay School
- Westfield School, Newcastle upon Tyne
- Westholme School
- Westonbirt School
- Westminster Abbey Choir School
- Westminster Cathedral Choir School
- Westminster School
- Westminster Under School
- Wetherby School
- Whitgift School
- Willington School
- Wimbledon High School
- Winchester College
- Windermere School
- Windlesham House School
- Wisbech Grammar School
- Witham Hall
- Withington Girls' School
- Woldingham School
- Wolverhampton Grammar School
- Woodbridge School
- Woodford Green Preparatory School
- Woodhouse Grove School, Leeds/Bradford
- Worksop College
- Worksop College Preparatory School
- Worth School
- Wrekin College
- Wycombe Abbey School, High Wycombe
- Wycliffe College, Gloucestershire

== Y ==
- Yarm School
- Yehudi Menuhin School of Music, Cobham
- York House School

== Former ==
1. Abbots Bromley School for Girls - closed in 2019
2. Abercorn School - closed in 2024
3. Alderley Edge School for Girls - closed in 2026
4. Alton School - closed in 2024
5. Aurora St Christopher's School, Bristol - closed in 2020
6. Barbara Speake Stage School - closed in 2020
7. Bedstone College - closed in July 2025
8. Belmont Preparatory School - closed in 2023
9. Bishop Challoner School - closed in 2025
10. Brigidine School - closed in 2019
11. Carmel Christian School - closed in 2022
12. Casterton School - closed in 2013
13. Dharma Primary School - closed in 2020
14. Durham High School for Girls - closed in 2026
15. European School Culham - closed in 2017
16. Fulneck School - closed in 2025
17. Getter's Talmud Torah - closed in 2018
18. Grace Dieu Manor School - closed in 2020
19. Greenacre School for Girls - closed in 2017
20. The Hampshire School, Chelsea - closed in 2024
21. Harvington School - closed in 2023 upon merger with Durston House
22. Heathland School - closed in 2022
23. Hemdean House School - closed in 2024
24. Hethersett Old Hall School - closed in 2019
25. Hope House School- closed in 2018
26. Lansdowne College - closed in 2017
27. Leeds Grammar School - closed in 2005 upon merger with Leeds Girls' High School
28. Loughborough Amherst School - closed in 2025
29. Mount St Mary's College - closed in 2025
30. Old Palace School (of John Whitgift) - closed in 2025
31. Our Lady's Abingdon, Oxfordshire - closed in 2025
32. Padworth College - closed in 2025
33. Priory Preparatory School, Banstead - closed in 2017
34. Queen Margaret's School, York - closed in 2025
35. Regents Academy - closed in 2017
36. The Royal School, Haslemere - closed in 2025
37. Stamford High School - closed in 2023
38. St. Aubyns School, Rottingdean, East Sussex - closed in 2013
39. St John's College, Portsmouth - closed in 2022
40. St Mary's School, Shaftesbury - closed in 2020
41. St Mary's School, Wantage - closed in 2007 upon merger with Heathfield School
42. Sunderland High School - closed in 2016
43. Towers Convent School - closed in 2020
44. Trinity School, Brentwood - closed in 2018
45. Uplands School - closed in 2009 upon merger
46. Welbeck Defence Sixth Form College - closed in 2021
47. Woodleigh School - closed in 2021
48. Wykeham House School - closed in 2015
