= List of schools in the Royal Borough of Kensington and Chelsea =

This is a list of schools in the Royal Borough of Kensington and Chelsea in London, England.

== State-funded schools ==
=== Primary schools ===
- ARK Brunel Primary Academy
- Ashburnham Community School
- Avondale Park Primary School
- Barlby Primary School
- Bevington Primary School
- Bousfield Primary School
- Christ Church CE Primary School
- Colville Primary School
- Fox Primary School
- Holy Trinity CE Primary School
- Kensington Primary Academy
- Marlborough Primary School
- Oratory RC Primary School
- Our Lady of Victories RC Primary School
- Oxford Gardens Primary School
- Park Walk Primary School
- St Barnabas' and St Philip's CE Primary School
- St Charles RC Primary School
- St Clement and St James CE Primary School
- St Cuthbert with St Matthias CE Primary School
- St Francis of Assisi RC Primary School
- St Joseph's RC Primary School
- St Gabriel's Lutheran Primary School
- St Mary Abbots CE Primary School
- St Mary's RC Primary School
- St Thomas' CE Primary School
- Servite RC Primary School
- Thomas Jones Primary School

=== Secondary schools ===
- All Saints Catholic College (RC, mixed)
- Cardinal Vaughan Memorial School (RC, boys)
- Chelsea Academy (CE, mixed)
- Holland Park School (mixed)
- Kensington Aldridge Academy (mixed)
- St Thomas More Language College (RC, mixed)

=== Special and alternative schools ===
- Chelsea Community Hospital School
- Kensington Queensmill School
- Parkwood Hall Co-operative Academy

=== Further education ===
- Kensington and Chelsea College
- St Charles Catholic Sixth Form College

== Independent schools ==
=== Primary and preparatory schools ===
- Bassett House School (non-selective, co-ed)
- Cameron House School (non-selective, co-ed)
- Chepstow House School (non-selective, co-ed)
- Falkner House Girls' School (selective, girls)
- Garden House School (non-selective, co-ed)
- Glendower Preparatory School (selective, girls)
- The Hampshire School, Chelsea (non-selective, co-ed)
- Hawkesdown House School (non-selective, boys)
- Hill House School (non-selective, co-ed)
- Kensington Wade (non-selective, co-ed)
- Knightsbridge School (non-selective, co-ed)
- La Petite Ecole Francaise (non-selective, co-ed)
- La Scuola Italiana A Londra (SIAL) (non-selective, co-ed)
- Norland Place School (non-selective, co-ed)
- Notting Hill Preparatory School (non-selective, co-ed)
- Pembridge Hall School (non-selective, girls)
- St Philip's School (non-selective, boys)
- The Stewart Bilingual School (non-selective, co-ed)
- Sussex House School, (non-selective, boys)
- Thomas's London Day Schools, (non-selective, co-ed)
- Wetherby School (non-selective, boys)

=== Senior and all-through schools ===
- Ashbourne College (selective, co-ed)
- Collingham College (selective, co-ed)
- Instituto Español Vicente Cañada Blanch (non-selective, co-ed)
- The Lloyd Williamson Schools (selective, co-ed)
- Lycée Français Charles de Gaulle (selective, co-ed)
- Mander Portman Woodward (selective, co-ed)
- More House School (selective, girls)
- Queen's Gate School (selective, girls)
- Russian Embassy School in London (non-selective, co-ed)
- Southbank International School (selective, co-ed)

=== Special and alternative schools ===
- Catch22 Pupil Parent Partnership
- Epic Learning
- Snowflake School
