= Igo =

Igo or IGO may refer to:

- Intergovernmental organization
- Igo language, a Kwa language of Togo
- Igo, California, a small town in the United States
- Igo, Kansas, a ghost town in the United States
- IATA-Code IGO of Jaime Ortiz Betancur Airport, Colombia
- iGO (software), a satellite navigation software package
- I-GO, a car-sharing service in Chicago, Illinois
- Girawali Observatory, India
- Go (game), known as igo in Japan
- Isebe language (ISO-639: igo), a Papuan language of Papua New Guinea
- IndiGo, an Indian low-cost airline (ICAO code IGO)
- International Greenwich Olympiad, an international project-based STEAM competition organised by North London Grammar School

== People ==
- Igo (singer), Latvian singer and songwriter
- Igo Chico, American saxophonist
- Igo Etrich (1879–1967), Austrian flight pioneer
- Igo Galama (876–910), potestaat (governor) of Friesland
- Igo Gruden (1893–1948), Slovene poet and translator
- Igo Sym (1896–1941), Austrian-born Polish actor and Nazi collaborator
