= Mayville High School =

Mayville High School may refer to:

- Mayville High School (Michigan), a school in Mayville, Michigan, United States (in "The Thumb" of Michigan)
- Mayville High School (Wisconsin), a school in Mayville, Wisconsin, United States
- Mayville High School (England), a school in Southsea, Portsmouth, Hampshire
