= Dilano Saldin =

American physicist

Dilano Saldin was an American physicist, specializing in theoretical condensed matter, particularly electron and x-ray diffraction. He worked as a professor at the University of Wisconsin-Milwaukee for 32 years.

== Early life and education ==
Saldin attended the North London Grammar School as a child. He obtained a BA in 1971 and a PhD in 1975, both from the University of Oxford. His dissertation was titled Some Applications of Theory of Electron Diffraction Contrast. Following his studies, he worked at the University of Oxford as a post-doctoral researcher in the Materials and Engineering Departments, then as a research fellow at the Imperial College London in the Physics department. In 1988, he became a faculty member at the University of Wisconsin-Milwaukee.

== Career ==
Saldin’s research focused on surface science, X-ray diffraction, fluorescence imaging, cell imaging, and nano-materials. Much of his work involved methods to go from diffraction data to atomic structures.

His early work had a surface science focus, particularly methods to invert low-energy electron diffraction data and invert the patterns formed when electrons are emitted from a surface by the photoelectric effect.

Later he became more interested in wirking with X-ray data. He was among the first researchers to recognize the potential significance of using free-electron lasers to generate X-rays. He also developed a technique for determining the structure of some viruses without using crystals by averaging the angular correlation of diffraction patterns.

Saldin was a consultant on electron diffraction to the International Union of Crystallography. He was also Executive Editor of Surface Review and Letters as well as a member of the editorial board of the Journal of Holography and Speckle and of the National Science Foundation Science and Technology Center on Biology with X-Ray Lasers.

Saldin holds two United States Patents in atomic imaging.

== Awards and recognition ==
In 2011, Saldin was elected as a fellow of the American Physical Society's Division of Condensed Matter Physics for "advancement of the theory of electron and x-ray diffraction and microscopy."

== Death ==
Saldin died due to a long-term illness on March 9, 2020. He is outlived by his children and wife.

== Selected publications ==
- Rous, P. J., Pendry, J. B., Saldin, D. K., Heinz, K., Müller, K., Bickel, N. "Tensor LEED: A Technique for High-Speed Surface-Structure Determination" Physical Review Letters 57.23(1986)
- Harp, G. R., Saldin, D. K., Tonner, B. P. "Atomic-resolution electron holography in solids with localized sources" Physical Review Letters 65.8(1990)
- Vvedensky, D.D, Saldin, D.K, Pendry, J.B "An update of DLXANES, the calculation of X-ray absorption near-edge structure" Computer Physics Communications 40.2-3(1986)
- Fung, Russell, Shneerson, Valentin, Saldin, Dilano K., Ourmazd, Abbas "Structure from fleeting illumination of faint spinning objects in flight" Nature Physics 5.1(2009)
- Saldin, D. K., de Andres, P. L. "Holographic LEED" Physical Review Letters 64.11(1990)
- Nepal, P., Saldin, D.K. "Difference structures from time-resolved small-angle and wide-angle x-ray scattering" Physical Review B, 97(19), 195426 (2018)
- Pendry, J.B., Saldin, D.K. "SEXAFS without X-rays" Surface Science 145.1(1984)
- Heinz, K., Saldin, D. K., Pendry, J. B. "Diffuse LEED and Surface Crystallography" Physical Review Letters 55.21(1985)
- Tonner, B. P., Han, Zhi-Lan, Harp, G. R., Saldin, D. K. "Scattered-wave integral-transform method of holographic-image reconstruction from forward-scattering diffraction patterns" Physical Review B 43.18(1991)
- Saldin, D. K., Harp, G. R., Chen, B. L., Tonner, B. P. "Theoretical principles of holographic crystallography" Physical Review B 44.6(1991)
- Lazarov, V. K., Plass, R., Poon, H-C., Saldin, D. K., Weinert, M., Chambers, S. A., Gajdardziska-Josifovska, M. "Structure of the hydrogen-stabilized polar surface: Integrated experimental and theoretical studies" Physical Review B 71.11(2005)
