= Grangewood Independent School =

Location
- Chester Road; Forest Gate, London, E7 8QT; England; 51.5397°N 0.0404°E

Information
- Type: Private school
- Religious affiliation: Christian
- Established: 1979
- Local authority: Newham
- Department for Education URN: 102789 Tables
- Head Teacher: Beverley Roberts
- Staff: 20
- Gender: Boys & Girls
- Age: 2 to 11
- Enrolment: 70~
- Houses: Old houses: Latimer (blue), Cranmer (green), Ridley (yellow) and Tennyson (red); New houses: Cedar (blue), Olive (green), Acacia (yellow) and Palm (red)
- Website: http://www.grangewoodschool.com

Grangewoood Independent School is an independent primary school situated in Chester Road, Forest Gate, in the London Borough of Newham, United Kingdom. It is a member of the Independent Schools Association and was last inspected by the Independent Schools Inspectorate in May 2016. The school provides Christian education for boys and girls aged 2–11 years.

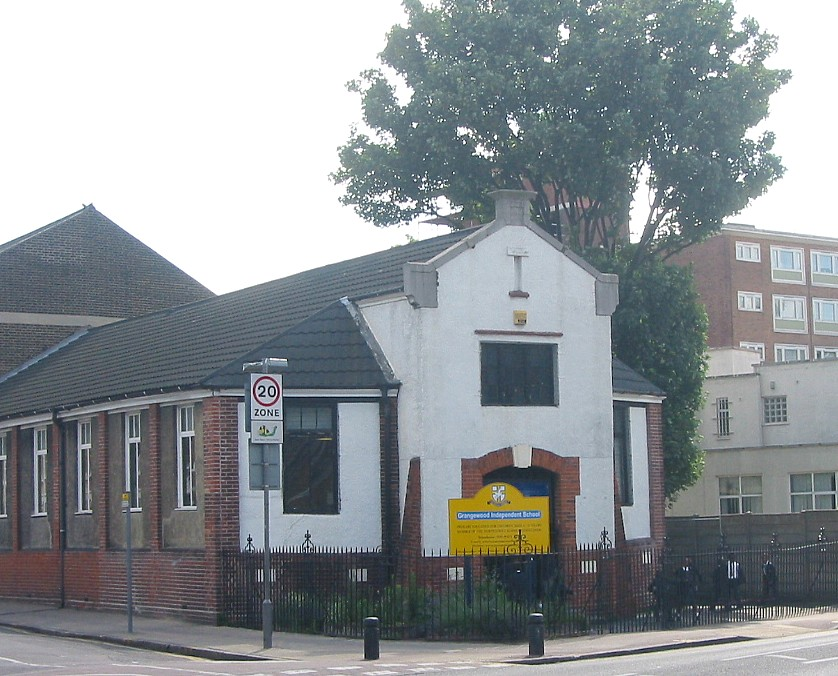
Grangewood School, September 2007

== Early history ==
Grangewood Independent School was founded in September 1979 by Dr. Clive Vellacott, a Christian doctor and his wife, Susan, who were members of East Ham Baptist Church situated in East Ham. The school was nevertheless open to children from other backgrounds and, over the years, the majority of children have come from Muslim, Hindu and other religious backgrounds.

The school opened with seven pupils for its first year in rooms in East Ham Baptist Church. In September 1980 the school moved to its present site, leasing the lower hall of the Plashet Park United Reformed Church. By this time the number of pupils had increased to twenty and the school received ‘Final Registration’ by the then Department of Education and Science.

At this time a secondary education department was commenced but this was not a viable operation and the department closed in December 1981. The school now consisted of approximately 54 pupils in three classes with a teaching staff of three (including the Head).

Early in 1989 the church announced that it would be closing and the school obtained a short lease on the whole of the site. By September the school had increased to five classes and 90 pupils. The founders had also been giving thought to the future control of the school and Grangewood Educational Association, a company limited by guarantee, was formed to take over ownership of the school. The company obtained charitable status in June 1990 and the transferral of ownership was duly effected.

The opportunity arose to purchase the freehold of the property and, with the help of a grant; the purchase was completed in November 1992.

== Recent Times ==
In the years since, a running programme of improvement and refurbishment has transformed the school and a sixth class has been added. The total school roll (as of June 2012) was 82 pupils which includes a mixed year 5/6 class in Key Stage 2.

== Head Teachers ==
Former Headteachers include:

Name	Dates
Mrs. Beverley Roberts	2012– Present
Mrs. Bim Amoekodo	2008– 2012
Mrs. Carol Adams	2001–2008
Mr. Paul Hyland-Bennett	1999–2001
Mr. Brian Davies	1996–1999
Mr. Steve Sherwood	TBA
Mrs. Elizabeth Allen	TBA
