= Thorpe Hall School =

Location
- Wakering Road; Southend-on-Sea, Essex, SS1 3RD; United Kingdom
- Coordinates: 51.54755°N 0.75855°E

Information
- Type: Other independent school
- Department for Education URN: 115402 Tables
- Gender: Coeducational
- Age: 2 to 16
- Website: www.thorpehall.southend.sch.uk

Thorpe Hall School is a coeducational independent school in Southend-on-Sea, Essex, England. The school is a member of the Independent Schools Council. The school admits students from age 2–16. The curriculum broadly follows the National Curriculum for England. The school also offers means tested bursaries.

== Facilities ==
Facilities include a nursery with outdoor learning area, a wilderness area, three purpose built classroom blocks, a Design and Technology workshop, an Art Studio, a Food and Textiles Studio, a fully-equipped Theatre seating 250 people, 11 acres of land including a 7-acre sports field.

A new £2m Sports Hall broke ground in January 2018 and as was opened in November 2018 by Olympic Gymnast Max Whitlock MBE

== History ==
Thorpe Hall School first opened with a cohort of six boys in 1925. Rev. E.D. de Russet was Headmaster from 1925 to 1930. Mr Benjamin Young was Principal and Headmaster from 1956 to 1971. The Current Headteacher, Mr Andrew Hampton, was elected Chair of the Independent Schools Association in 2014 for one year and elected a Fellow of the Royal Society of Arts.

In 2016 the school applied to the Southend Borough Council to improve its sports facilities. This included the building of a new sports hall.

== Notable alumni ==
Notable attendees of the school include TV presenter Rachel Riley, musician James Bourne and actors Sam Strike and Joe Gallucci.

== Reputation ==
The school was ranked among the top 100 Preparatory Schools by The Sunday Times for excellent SAT's results in 2015, 2016 and 2017 It has been recognised with awards from the Independent Schools Association for Excellence & Innovation in Senior Provision in 2016, Excellence & Innovation in Early Years in 2017, Pupils' Mental Health and Wellbeing in 2019. The school competes in many sporting events around the UK through links with the Southend Primary Schools Sports Association and the Independent Schools Association.

In 2014, the deputy head at the time, Martin Goldberg, was found dead in his home by police officers investigating child pornography allegations.
