= Abercorn School =

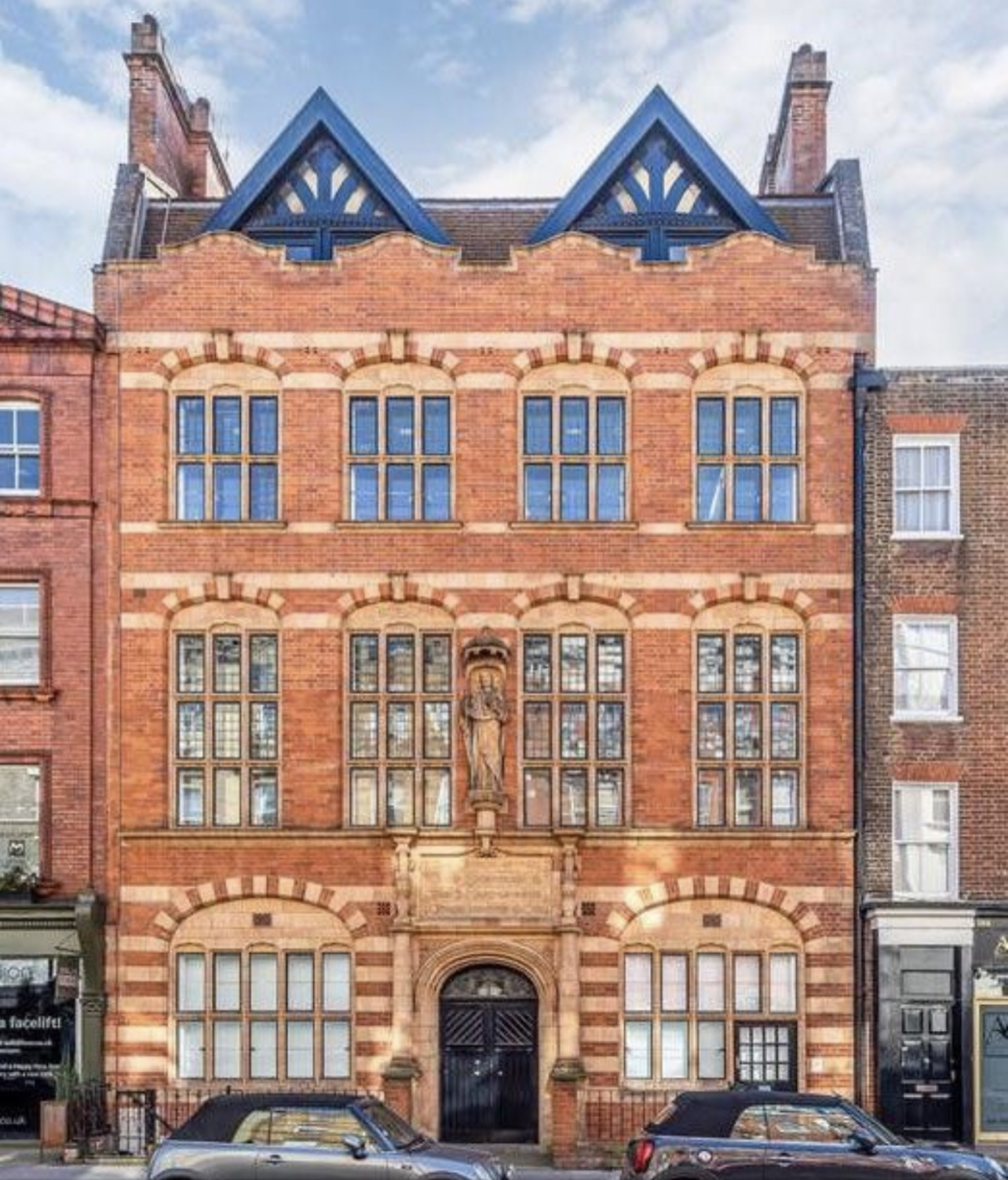
- Abercorn's new Senior School, 59-60 Paddington Street

Location
- 28 Abercorn Place, 60 Paddington Street; London, NW8 9XP; England; 51.53272°N 0.17971°W

Information
- Type: Private day school
- Established: 1987
- Founder: Andrea Greystoke
- Local authority: Westminster
- Department for Education URN: 101177 Tables
- President: Andrea Greystoke, Founder
- Chair: John Clarke
- Head teacher: Christopher Hammond
- Gender: Coeducational
- Age: 2 to 16
- Houses: Dickens, O'Connor, Thackery, Victoria,
- Website: http://www.abercornschool.com

Abercorn School was an independent private school in central London for pupils ages 2–16 years. Abercorn School had two separate premises, all within walking distance in St John's Wood and Marylebone, London. The school was opened in 1987 by Andrea Greystoke. The school abruptly closed and entered administration in July 2024, following the death of its founder. It had been struggling with declining student numbers and rising costs since the pandemic.

Abercorn used the Early Years Foundation Stage and the National Curriculum as a basis for teaching. Abercorn was a through-school, although some pupils moved on to a wide range of independent secondary schools or boarding schools at the end of Year 6, with students who progressed to Abercorn's Senior School. Pupils were prepared for the 11+ and 13+ examinations, as well as GCSEs.

Abercorn School was a member of ISA, the Independent Schools Association, and also IAPS, the Independent Association of Preparatory Schools.

== Background ==
Abercorn was founded in 1987 by Andrea Greystoke, who early in her teaching days was the first female teacher at St. Paul’s Boys’ School, and then similarly at King’s College School, London.

Abercorn started as a pre-prep on Abercorn Place, London, accepting students aged 2–8 years old. To accept older students and provide further facilities, Abercorn expanded throughout the years. In 2002, due to increased demand, the school’s Marylebone Road premises opened, which was originally the home of the Philological School – also known as the Old Grammar School – and then of St Marylebone Grammar School. In 2014, the school expanded further and opened its Portland Place premises which is home to those aged 9–13. Most recently, new premises on Paddington have been acquired for the Senior School. Currently, the Lower School houses pupils in Nursery to Year 2, with the Senior School accommodating pupils from Year 3 and above.

The Paddington Street premises is a beautifully converted former church which was formerly home to renowned Pineapple Dance Studios. The building was also previously used by Regent's University London. There is ample space for dedicated classrooms, a purposeful built theatre, and access to outdoor space at nearby Paddington Gardens.

== Education and extracurricular activities ==
Abercorn School provided expert teaching in a range of specialist subjects. Yoga, Music and French were taught by dedicated subject teachers from the age of 2, weekly swimming from age 3, and all students also learned the clarinet from age 8. The school also offered a variety of extra-curricular activities for all age groups, including Gymnastics, Taekwondo, Sports, Drama and Art for the youngest students. For the older students, extra-curricular activities included Athletics, Football, Netball, Art, Computer Coding and Choir.

Abercorn School placed great importance on pastoral care and the development of children's individual, personal, social and emotional skills.

== The British International School of New York ==
Andrea Greystoke, founder of Abercorn School, also set up a sister school in the US, the British International School of New York, which opened in 2006.
