= Rochester Independent College =

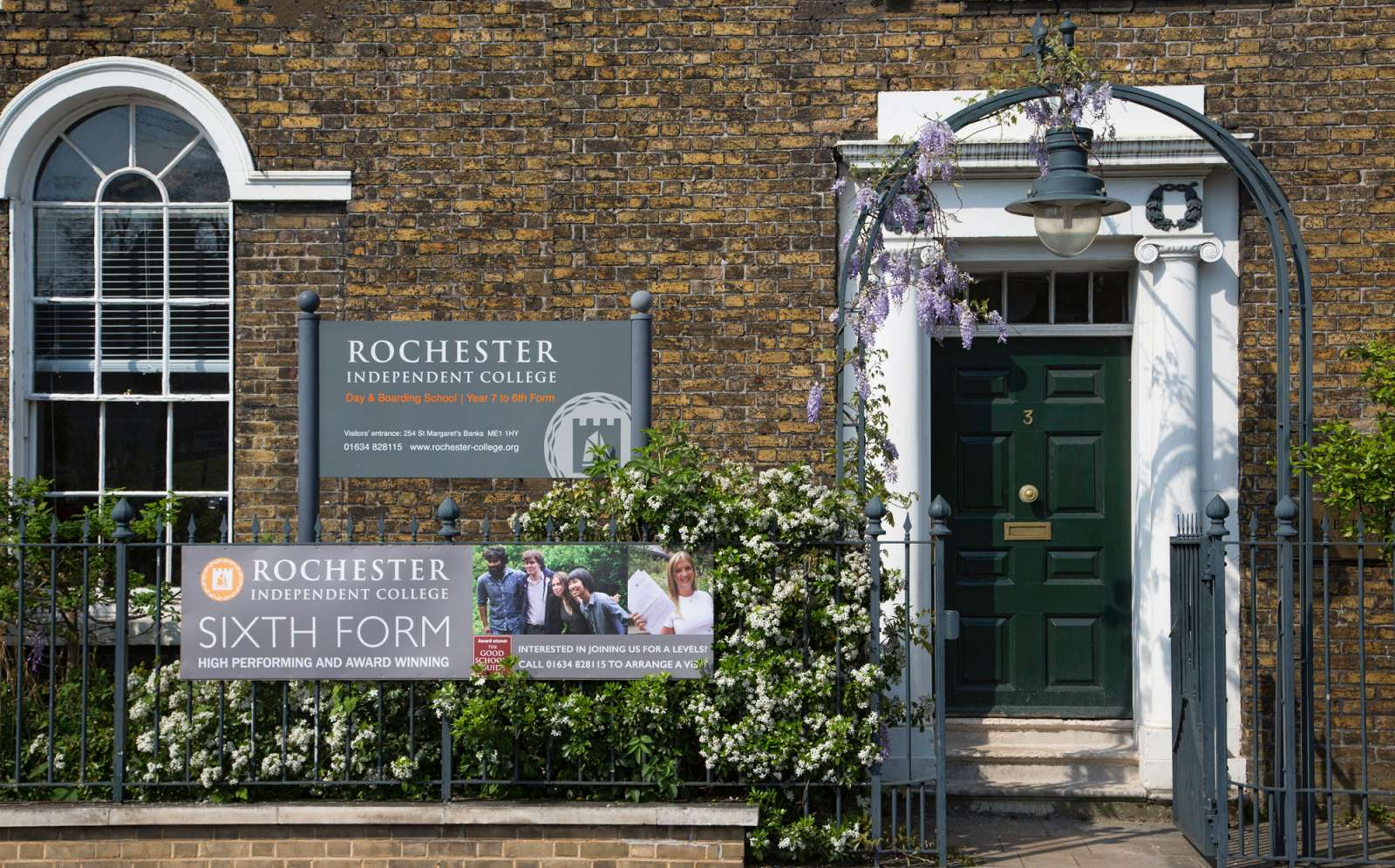

Location
- Star Hill; Rochester, Kent, ME1 1XF; England; 51°23′02″N 0°30′31″E

Information
- Type: Private day and boarding school
- Established: 1984
- Founder: Brian Pain
- Department for Education URN: 119006 Tables
- Principal: Alistair Brownlow
- Staff: 100
- Gender: Mixed
- Age: 11 to 19
- Enrolment: 345
- Publication: Flying Pigs
- Fees: £12,600-£34,000/year
- Website: rochester-college.org.uk

Rochester Independent College (RIC) is an Independent Schools Council accredited co-educational, private day and boarding school, in Rochester, United Kingdom. It was established in 1984.

== History ==
Opened in 1984 by mathematicians Brian Pain and Simon de Belder, the college was known as Rochester Tutors and was predominantly 6th form, teaching A levels and retakes. Gradually over the next 3 decades the campus grew to 14 (mainly) listed buildings in the heart of Rochester and changed its name to Rochester Independent College. The Lower School was opened in 2007. The school now has a flourishing senior school (Lower school students age 11+) and sixth form.

The college mascot is the flying pig, a riposte to the cynicism which greeted the college’s chances of success when it was founded.

The college joined the Dukes Education Group in 2016.

== Campus ==
It started as one terraced house, but as the school expanded, it gradually bought up 14 (mainly) listed buildings in the heart of a designated conservation area.

A pair of steel sculptural musical gates leads to the grounds. The gates are an art installation created by Henry Dagg, sound sculptor, experimental musical instrument builder and Bjork collaborator. Standing almost four metres tall and eight metres wide across the structure is designed to make music with vibraphone bars, tubular bells, and organ pipe-like tubes with resonating strings that can be plucked, struck or bowed. Medway Council refused planning permission for the gates in 2004 on the grounds of noise pollution, but this was overturned by a government inspector.

In 2025 Northbank a new boarding hub and creative arts centre was opened on the site of the old Peugeot garage and AF Smith on the old high street.

== Students ==
The school has a total of about 420 students, with a relatively even mix of boys and girls. About 180 students are boarders and the rest are day students from the local area.

Approximately 60% of the students are from the UK and 40% are international from countries such as Thailand, Italy, Spain, China, Hong Kong, Nigeria, and Russia. Of the 280 students in the Sixth Form, many will have stayed on from Years 7–11.

Students from Thailand join the College each year funded by the Royal Thai Government Scholarship programme for A level courses.

== Lower School – Years 7–11 ==
The Lower School is located in New Road House, on the main college campus. It is co-educational and the principal entry point is at Year 7 but there is flexible entry throughout the school. It took its first pupils in September 2007. There are a maximum of 12 in each class.

The Lower School is non-selective. Most of the students are from the UK. Student numbers are about 140.

== Inspection judgements ==
The school was inspected by Ofsted in 2008, and judged Good. Since then the responsibility for assessment has passed to ISI.

== Accreditation ==
Rochester Independent College is affiliated to the Independent Schools Council (ISC) and a member of the Independent Schools Association (ISA) and the Boarding Schools Association (BSA). The college is also a member of British Boarding Schools Connected.

== Notable staff ==
- Artist and musician Billy Childish is a visiting lecturer
