= Beech Hall School =

Independent school in Macclesfield, England

Coordinates: 53.270°N 2.131°W

- Macclesfield, Cheshire, SK10 2EG; England

Information
- Type: Private
- Motto: possunt quia posse videntur - We can because we think we can
- Religious affiliation: Church of England
- Established: 1925
- Head of Foundation: James Allen
- Gender: Mixed
- Age: 4 to 19 (Sixth Form)
- Enrolment: School: 180
- Houses: Ash, Oak, Yew
- Colours: Red, White and Black
- Publication: The Griffin (Newsletter)
- Website: http://www.beechhallschool.org/

Beech Hall School is a private school in Macclesfield, England and is a member of both IAPS (Independent Association of Preparatory Schools) and ISA (Independent Schools Association).

== History ==
Beech Hall School was founded in 1926 as a preparatory school for boys.

The site which Beech Hall stands on dates back to the Iron Age, where it would have been used as a defensive site. The house named Beech Hall has been in existence on the site since 1435, when it was the main residence of the Worth family. In Victorian times it was called Higher Beech; it has been called Beech Hall since the start of the 20th century. Beech Hall itself is a large country house set in over sixteen acres of wooded grounds.

In 1960, the swimming pool at Beech Hall School was built; during excavation a Bronze Age clay pot, which contained burial bones, was discovered.

In 1966, the school became a limited company and a charitable trust. Girls were first admitted in 1981, and by 2009 one third of the pupils were girls.

== Extracurricular ==
School sports include football, hockey, netball, and cricket and there are several teams for boys and girls. But there are non sports activities such as a musical soirée every term, an enrichment week on the last week of term with Friday being church day.
