= Carleton House Preparatory School =

Coordinates: 53.3854°N 2.8949°W

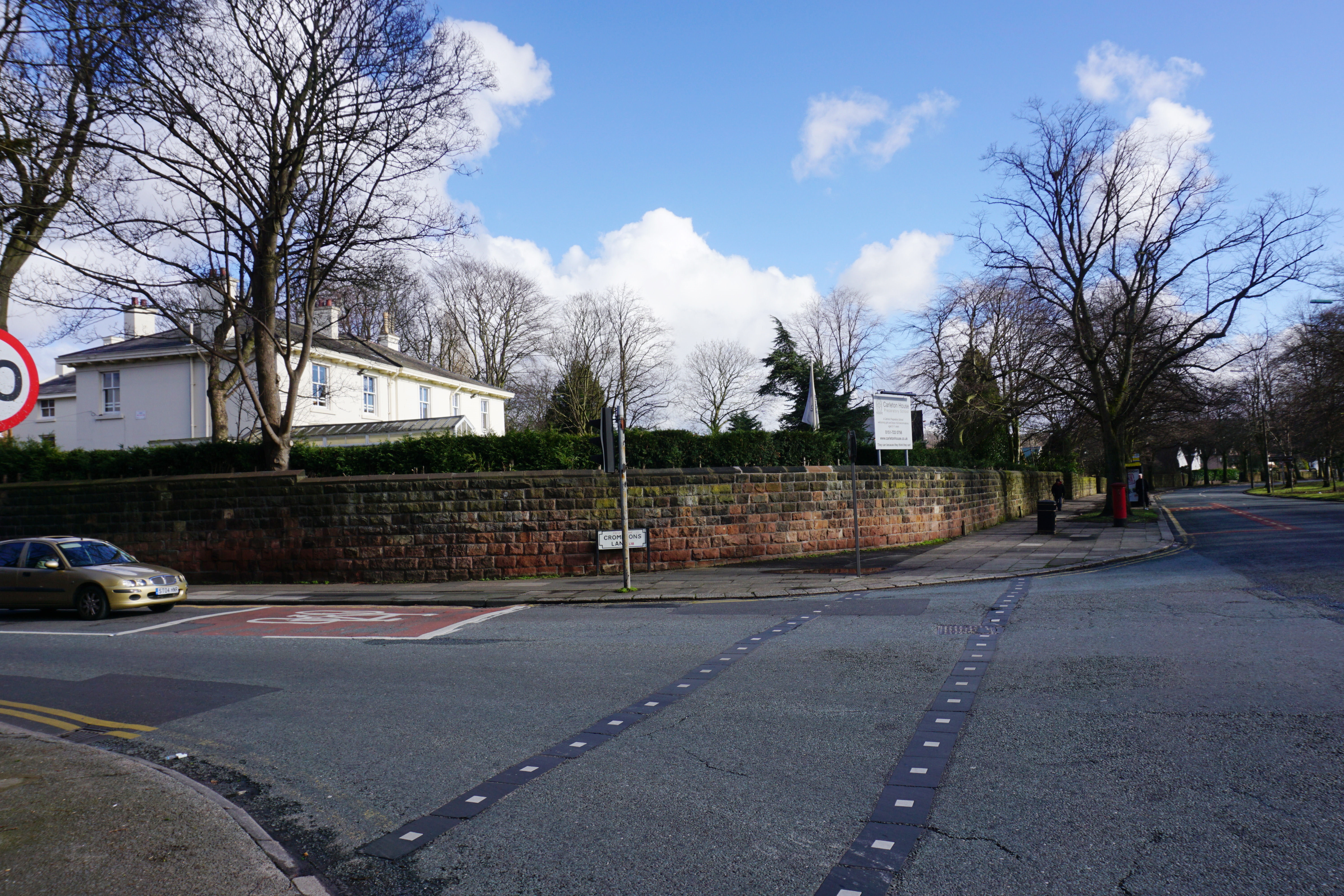
- 145 Menlove Ave, Liverpool

Information
- Former name: Woolton Hall
- School type: Private Catholic Preparatory School
- Religious affiliation(s): Roman Catholic
- Established: 1974 (as Carleton House)
- Inspectorate: ISI
- Department for Education URN: 104723 Tables
- Head teacher: Mrs S Coleman
- Staff: 35
- Enrollment: 183
- Colour(s)
- School fees: £10,290 (2024)
- Affiliation: ISA
- Website: https://carletonhouse.co.uk/

Carleton House is a Catholic private preparatory school in Liverpool, England, that educates children from the ages of 3–11. It is a member of the Independent Schools Association and is overseen by the Independent Schools Inspectorate.

== History ==
Throughout their histories, Carleton House and its forerunner Woolton Hall Preparatory School have occupied three sites.

=== Wooton Hall ===
The first site, Woolton Hall, was a Classical Grade-I listed stately home used as a military hospital during the Second World war. There was a Notre Dame convent at Woolton Hall by the end of World War II. The Sisters of the Convent of Notre Dame converted it to a school, running it as a private preparatory school and also a high school until its amalgamation with Notre Dame Mount Pleasant in 1970. Then Woolton Hall Preparatory School merged with Notre Dame High School to form Notre Dame Woolton.

=== Carleton House ===
After Notre Dame Woolton's dissolution in 1974, a group of its parents came together to preserve the traditions and values of a unique Catholic preparatory school.

Carleton House, a 19th Century home on Lyndhurst Road in Mossley Hill, became the home of the new school, Carleton House Preparatory School, in 1977. The school remained there through 2008.

=== Beechenhurst ===
The next building, Beechenhurst, a former stately home constructed around 1876 for Sir Edward Percy Bates (2nd Baronet, an East India Company Merchant and the son of Sir Edward Bates, 1st Baronet) had passed upon his death to his second son Percy Bates, Chairman of the Cunard Line. In 1957 it began to house Beechenhurst Preparatory school, a Church of England independent school. After that school's closure in 2008, the site was purchased by Carleton House, which moved in 2009 to its current location in Beechenhurst, keeping the namesake of its previous location.

== Constitution and charity ==
Carleton House Peparatory School is a registered charity (No. 505310) with the goal of providing education and training to children and young people in the Liverpool City Region, upholding the links to the Catholic faith. It is governed by a board of nine trustees.

In 2024 Carleton had a total gross income of £1.87 Million.

The School also supports other charitable endeavours. In 2016 it supported a campaign to assist the Charity Support dogs. The campaign raised £20,000 and involved a stunt in which the headmistress of the school skydived from an plane.

== The school ==
Carleton's motto is, "They can, because they think they can."

Carleton maintains close links with the Archdiocese of Liverpool, and its choir has performed in the Archdioceses Cathedral. The school welcomes children of all faiths, with approximately half of the students being Roman Catholic.

Carleton's traditional private school uniform includes caps, shirts, shorts or tunics, school blazers, and ties.

SATs results in 2022 saw Carleton pupils scoring an average of 110, compared to the national average of 100. The following year 100% of students achieved on or above the national average in English, and GPS with 95% achieving this in maths and writing. Carleton also fields competitive junior teams in football, cross country, and swimming competing within Liverpool Junior School leagues as well as Regional and National Leagues.

A high proportion of students go on to pass the entry exam to the Liverpool Blue Coat School, a grammar school in Liverpool. Some also attend other Liverpool schools, such as St Mary's College, Liverpool College, and Merchant Taylors' School.

Year groups (Reception to Year 6) have an average of 23 students.

The School's mascot is Carleton Mouse, who was featured as the protagonist in a Christmas book, set in the school, authored by Helen Yoxall Burns, titled Carleton's Motto Saves the Grotto, published in 2022. A follow up to the Christmas themed book set at the school was released in 2023.
