= Sixth form college =

Advanced school for students aged 16–19

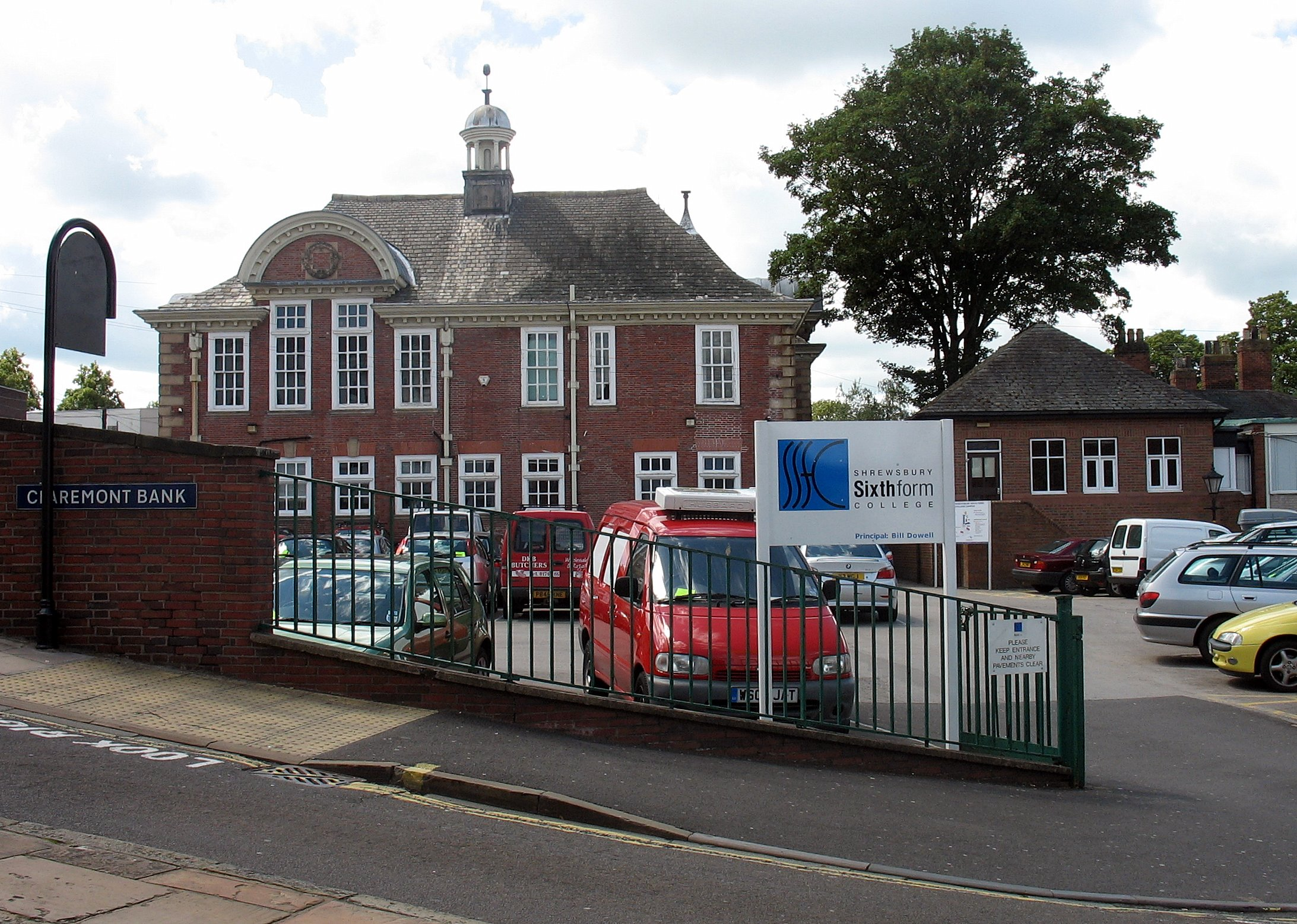
Shrewsbury Sixth Form College in Shropshire

A sixth form college is an educational institution, where students aged 16 to 19 study typically for advanced post-school level qualifications such as A Levels, Business and Technology Education Council level 3 (BTEC), and the International Baccalaureate Diploma, or school-level qualifications such as General Certificate of Secondary Education (GCSE) examinations and BTEC level 2 qualifications. In many countries this type of educational institute is known as a junior college. The municipal government of the city of Paris uses the phrase 'sixth form college' as the English name for a lycée (high school).

== Brunei ==
There are a few schools in Brunei providing sixth form education. Five of them are dedicated sixth form colleges, with four located in Brunei-Muara District and one in Tutong District. Belait has yet to have its own sixth form centre and sixth form education is presently housed in Sayyidina Ali Secondary School, sharing facilities with the secondary education. There is no sixth form education in Temburong – prospective students go to sixth form colleges in Brunei-Muara where they may stay in dormitories.

Almost all sixth form schools are government schools. Five of them provide education leading up to Brunei-Cambridge GCE A Level qualification. Jerudong International School is a non-government school which has sixth form education and its A Level is independent of those offered by its counterpart. Along with International School Brunei which offers the program International Baccalaureate Diploma instead of A Levels after the completion of International General Certificate of Secondary Education in their lower secondary year.

Another school, Hassanal Bolkiah Boys' Arabic Secondary School, is a government sixth form centre for students in the specialised Arabic stream. Instead of A Level subjects, students generally learn subjects pertaining to Islamic knowledge in Arabic medium. The schooling culminates in the sitting of Sijil Tinggi Pelajaran Ugama Brunei (STPUB), translatable as the Higher Certificate of Brunei Religious Education. They may then proceed to Islamic universities, locally or abroad such as Al-Azhar University.

== Caribbean ==
In the English-speaking Caribbean, there are many sixth form colleges, usually attached to secondary schools. Students must usually attain a grade A-C in 1–3 in the Caribbean Examinations Council (C.X.C) CSEC examinations before proceeding onto the sixth form to sit the CAPE examinations. Students that fail these exams are not accepted into the sixth form program and can do either: courses in other further education facilities, or begin work with high school degrees.

== Malaysia ==
The sixth form in Malaysia is one of types of education prior continuing to degree level. Modeled after the United Kingdom's sixth form, it is divided into two level, the lower sixth form and the upper sixth. It is usually taken by students at the age of 18 after completing Sijil Pelajaran Malaysia (SPM), Malaysian Certificate of Education). Before finishing their sixth form education, all the students are required to sit for Sijil Tinggi Pelajaran Malaysia (STPM, Malaysian Higher School Certificate) or Sijil Tinggi Agama Malaysia.

Starting 2023, the sixth form education has undergo a reform due to lack of interest among SPM leavers. Sixth form colleges has been renamed Pre-University College with the leadership has been change from Principal to Director. This is reflecting to the reality of tertiary education instead of secondary education, in which the Form 6 has been viewed as still a part of secondary school.

== Singapore ==
In Singapore, Sixth form colleges are referred to as Junior Colleges which are Post-Secondary Education institutes offering two-year academic programmes that prepare students for the GCE A-Levels.

== United Kingdom ==
In England and the Caribbean, education is currently compulsory until Year 13, the school year in which the pupil turns 18. (Note: Previously in England, education was compulsory only until Year 11 before August 2013 and until Year 12 between August 2013 and 2015.) In the English state educational system, pupils may either stay at a secondary school with an attached sixth form, transfer to a local sixth form college, or go to a more vocational further education college, although in some places not all these options are available. Some places only provide tertiary colleges, a "combination" between sixth form and further education colleges. In the independent sector including public schools, sixth forms are an integral part of secondary schools, and there are also a number of smaller-scale independent sixth form colleges. In Scotland and Wales, education is only compulsory until the end of Year 11.

Students at sixth form college typically study for two years (known as Years 1 and 2 – Years 13 and 14 in Northern Ireland – or lower sixth and upper sixth). Some students sit AS examinations at the end of the first year, and A-level examinations at the end of the second. These exams are called C.A.P.E. (Caribbean Advanced Proficiency Examination) in the Caribbean. A variety of vocational courses have also been added to the curriculum.

There are currently over 90 sixth form colleges in England and Wales. Most of these perform extremely well in national examination league tables. In addition, they offer a broader range of courses at a lower cost per student than most school sixth forms. In a few areas, authorities run sixth-form schools which function like sixth-form colleges but are completely under the control of the local education authorities. Unlike further education colleges, sixth-form colleges rarely accept part-time students or run evening classes, although there is one boarding sixth-form college, Peter Symonds College, which takes Falkland Islands students for sixth form.

=== England ===
The first comprehensive intake sixth form college in England was established in 1966 in Luton, Bedfordshire; Luton Sixth Form College took its first intake of students in September that year. Since then sixth form colleges have spread across England and have proved popular with students, their parents, and other groups in the community. By the start of 1976, 22 non-metropolitan counties had sixth forms, totalling 68 colleges; three of these counties had tertiary colleges. From 1991, sixth form colleges were permitted to provide some vocational courses approved by BTEC.

Until 1992, these colleges were controlled and funded by local education authorities (LEAs), but the Further and Higher Education Act 1992 transferred all institutions within the sector to the Further Education Funding Council for England (FEFC), a national agency with strategic responsibility for the operation of general further education (FE) colleges. This effectively made them legislatively indistinguishable from further education colleges. Later the FEFC's functions were taken over by the Learning and Skills Council (LSC), a reorganisation that included changes in the funding and supervision of sixth form colleges.

These colleges take responsibility for their own employment, pensions and pay arrangements with the support and advice of the Sixth Form Colleges' Association (SFCA, formerly SFCF). The SFCA is made up of representative principals from SFCs across the UK. The SFCA sets up several committees to deliver its range of support services for SFCs as well as facilitating lobbying work with the central government. Colleges for the most part do not charge full-time daytime students; however, adult students (most of whom attend evening classes) may have to pay a fee (for examinations, tutors' time and other costs).

There are also some sixth form colleges in the independent sector, specialising in A levels for which fees are paid; these are unconnected with the SFCA.

Ofsted statistics from 2006/2007 show that sixth form colleges have a higher amount of "Outstanding" judgements compared to school sixth forms and further education colleges.

=== Scotland ===
Scotland does not, in general, have separate sixth form colleges (or, indeed, the same concept of the terminal two years of secondary education as being distinct from the other time spent there); as such, Scottish students who opt to remain in full-time education will typically remain in the same school for fifth and sixth year (the equivalent to the English lower- and upper-sixth forms), studying Higher Grade and Advanced Higher qualifications. Higher Grade qualifications can be taken in both the fifth and sixth years.

=== Wales ===
In Wales, sixth form education falls under the remit of the Senedd (the Welsh Parliament), and sixth form colleges are sources of further education alongside FE colleges and sixth forms integrated into secondary schools. They typically offer the Welsh Baccalaureate and Key Skills qualifications.

== See also ==
- College or CEGEP (an equivalent in the Canadian province of Quebec)
- List of private schools in England
- Junior college (the equivalent in the Indian Education System)
- Junior College in Singapore
- Sixth form colleges in Hong Kong
- Sixth form colleges in the United Kingdom
- Senior secondary education
- Tasmanian college (Senior High School) (an equivalent in Tasmania)
- United World Colleges (International Baccalaureate university preparatory 2-year schools with deliberate multinational enrolment)
