= Regent Independent College =

Coordinates: 51.5770°N 0.3709°W

Location
- 153 Great Titchfield Street, Fitzrovia; London; London, W1W 5BD; England

Information
- Type: Private sixth form
- Established: 2000
- Department for Education URN: 134891 Tables
- Ofsted: Reports
- Co-Principals: Tharshiny Pankaj and Selva Pankaj
- Gender: Coeducational
- Age: 16 to 19
- Enrolment: 40 as of March 2022
- Website: https://www.regentcollege.uk.com/

Regent Independent College is a private coeducational Sixth Form College providing A- Level courses located in London, England.

The college is inspected by the Independent Schools Inspectorate (ISI).

== History ==
The college first opened in 2000.

== Curriculum ==
The school offers A Level courses in a range of subjects as well as offering retake courses and resits for students from other schools. The college also offers an on-line tutorial programme for pupils from overseas.
