= Heathland School =

School in Lancashire, England

Coordinates: 53.7494°N 2.35155°W

Information
- Established: 1802
- Closed: 2022
- Age: 3 months to 16 years

Heathland School was an independent school situated in Accrington, Lancashire in England. The school accepted children from the age of three months in the nursery area, up to the age of sixteen.

== Departments ==
The school was split into four "departments".

- Baby Unit - Children from the age of three months to two years
- Nursery - Children from the age of two years to four years
- Junior School - Children from the age of four years to eleven years. Key Stages One and Two were studied.
- Senior School - Children from the age of eleven years to sixteen years. Key Stage Three and GCSEs were studied.

== History ==
The school was built in 1802 as an all-girls school. In 1889 the old school building was demolished. A new home was built in 1900 by Sir George Watson MacAlpine. The surrounding gardens were designed by T. H. Mawson. This was later used as a rest home for the elderly.

The school closed in 2022 after suffering financial losses as a result of the COVID-19 pandemic. Students were invited to move to Moorland School in Clitheroe, along with some of the teachers.

== Curriculum ==
Both the junior and senior school studied Mathematics, English, Science, History, Geography, French, Music, IT, PE and Art and Design. Most of these subjects could also be taken at GCSE.
