= British International School of New York =

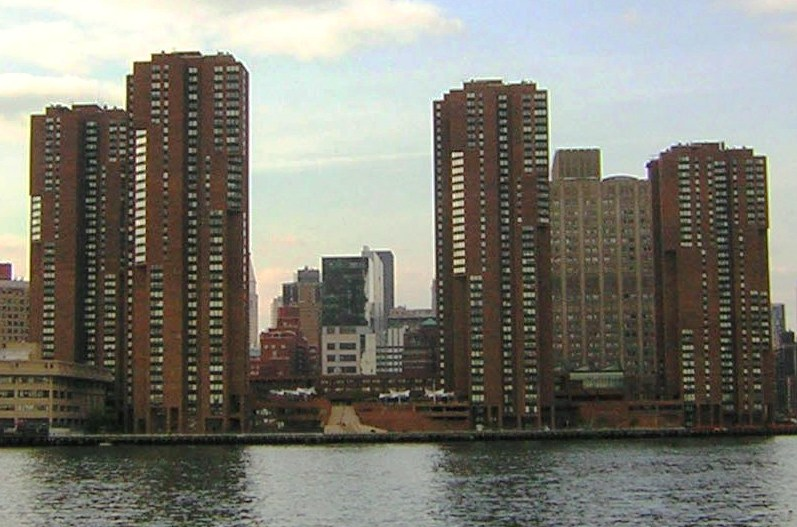
- Waterside Plaza; the British International School of New York is located at the base of the second tower from the left

Location
- 20 Waterside Plaza, New York, New York 10010 USA; United States; 40°44′12.3″N 73°58′22″W

Information
- Motto: Be kind, be kind, be kind.
- Established: 2006
- Website: www.bis-ny.org

The British International School of New York (BIS-NY) was established in 2006 at Waterside Plaza, an upscale development on the East River in the Kips Bay neighborhood of Manhattan, New York City. The student body is a mix of British expatriates, American nationals and students from a mix of other countries, and includes both boys and girls. The school serves students from age three up to upper school. Its facilities include a swimming pool, secured playground, gymnasium, and Smart Boards in every classroom. The school offers rolling admissions, so that children can enter the school throughout the year, as long as there is space available. This is particularly helpful for families who have been transferred internationally at short notice.

The school teaches a mix of the English National Curriculum blended with the methodology of the International Baccalaureate. French and Spanish are taught at every level of the school, with other languages available as after-school options. Individual music lessons are also offered in addition to the class lessons, and a summer camp is run through the months of June to August.

The school's enrollment has increased regularly, which has led to the school's continued expansion. Recently, the school opened a new building adjacent to the cafeteria which contains an office and two classrooms specifically designed to meet the needs of the older students as they head into middle school. From September 2018 the school launched its Upper School, with IGCSE and A-Level programmes to its students.

The British International School of New York is the sister school of Abercorn School in London, England and has been recognised as a Good Schools Guide International School as well as being accredited by the International Baccalaureate as a World School and COBIS and ISI accredited.

== Clubs and extracurricular activities ==
The school has a debate team that participates in the English-speaking Union Big Apple Debate league.

Most clubs run from 3:30pm–4:30pm on school days, though some clubs can run to 5:30 or 6:00. The clubs include Arabic, Ballet, Chess, Coding, Fencing, Global Chefs, Ice Skating, Karate, Mandarin, Robotics, Table Tennis, and Yoga.

Some notable clubs of the school include Empire State of Sound (the school's show choir) and the school play, which have recently performed Peter Pan, Wizard of Oz, Bye Bye Birdie, Oliver, Beauty and the Beast, and Matilda, with casts of up to 70 children from grades 3–8.

== See also ==
American schools in the United Kingdom:

- The American School in London
- American School in England
