= Garden House School =

Location
- Turks Row; Chelsea; London, SW3 4TW; England; 51.4899°N 0.1577°W

Information
- Type: Private school Preparatory, pre-prep day schools and Kindergarten
- Motto: Latin: Non Sibi sed Omnibus ("Not for one, for all")
- Established: 1951
- Founder: Margery de Brissac Bernard
- Local authority: Kensington and Chelsea
- Department for Education URN: 100522 Tables
- Heads: Emma Studd (Girls' School); Venetia Banbury (Early Years); Richard Lock (Boys' School)
- Gender: Co-educational
- Age: 3 to 11
- Enrolment: 500~
- Colour: Teal
- Website: www.gardenhouseschool.co.uk

Garden House School is a co-educational day private school located in Chelsea in the Royal Borough of Kensington and Chelsea in London, England, consisting of two major preparatory schools, two pre-prep schools and a Kindergarten. The girls' and boys' are separately taught within the same building, but share a large variety of extra-curricular activities. Children are educated from the ages of three to eleven. Garden House School is reported to send a large proportion of its children to the leading boarding schools and London senior schools. The school also has locations in the US, in New York State: the suburban village of Briarcliff Manor and New York City.

The schools' garden is within the historic grounds of the Royal Hospital Chelsea, and occupies the Cavalry House, part of the Duke of York's Headquarters on Turks Row, which is a Grade II Listed Building.

== History ==
Garden House School was founded in 1951 by a former ballerina and socialite, Margery de Brissac Bernard, (1896–1994), as a single pre-preparatory school. It was based in Sloane Gardens and Pont Street in Chelsea. During the following twenty years, the school educated the children and grand-children of diplomats and Prime Ministers including Winston Churchill and Alec Douglas-Home. In 1973, a parent and teaching assistant, Mrs Jillian Oddy, took over the school, expanding to include a Kindergarten and two major pre-prep and prep schools, and by creating two new pre-schools in the United States, one in New York City and another in Briarcliff Manor, New York.

In 2004, the school moved into a single, purpose-designed building on the south side of the Duke of York's development. Boys and girls continued to be taught separately, but now shared the facilities of a single building.

== Academic record ==
Besides the regular National Curriculum subjects, girls and boys are taught a wide range of subjects. They are educated separately, but participate together in a variety of extracurricular activities.

The October 2024 ISI Inspection Report states "The broad and balanced curriculum provides a wide-ranging education that prepares pupils well for the future. Staff teach well-planned and engaging lessons. Pupils make good progress across a wide range of subjects and develop particularly advanced linguistic skills. Consequently, they are successful in gaining places at selective schools in London and further afield."

== Notable alumni ==
- Lady Margarita Armstrong-Jones, jewelry designer and granddaughter of Princess Margaret, Countess of Snowdon
- Viola Prettejohn, actress
- Kate Reardon, journalist
- Eloise Taylor, granddaughter of the Prince Edward, Duke of Kent and Katharine, Duchess of Kent
- Estella Taylor, granddaughter of the Prince Edward, Duke of Kent and Katharine, Duchess of Kent

== See also ==
- List of independent schools in England
