= Trinity School, Brentwood =

Trinity School

Location
- Brizes Park, Ongar Road, Kelvedon Hatch; Brentwood, Essex, CM15 0DG; England
- Coordinates: 51.66278°N 0.269°E

Information
- Type: Independent School
- Religious affiliation: Christian
- Closed: 2018
- Local authority: Essex
- Department for Education URN: 115431 Tables
- Gender: Coeducational
- Age: 4 to 18
- Enrolment: 135
- Website: http://www.trinityschool.ac

Trinity School (formerly Peniel Academy) was an independent school in Essex, England. The school was located in Brentwood and was closely linked to Trinity Church. The school closed in 2018.
