= Hope House School =

Location
- 2 Blucher Street; Barnsley, South Yorkshire, S70 1AP; England; 53.551°N 1.483°W

Information
- Other name: HHS
- Former name: Barnsley Christian School
- Type: Private school
- Religious affiliation: Christian
- Established: 1985
- Closed: 27 April 2018
- Local authority: Barnsley Metropolitan Borough Council
- Oversight: Hope House Church
- Trust: Hope House School Trust
- Department for Education URN: 106659 Tables
- Ofsted: Reports
- Principal: Su Wood
- Gender: Mixed
- Age range: 4–16
- Enrolment: 55 (2019)
- Capacity: 98
- Website: www.hopehouseschool.org.uk

Hope House School (HHS, formerly Barnsley Christian School) was a 4–16 mixed, Christian, private school in Barnsley, South Yorkshire, England. It was established in 1985 and closed on 27 April 2018. It was part of the Hope House Church.

== History ==
Hope House School was established in 1985 as part of the mission of Hope House Church and was known as Barnsley Christian School. It changed its name to Hope House School in September 2012 and Hope House School Trust was set up as a company with charitable status to be the proprietor of the school. It shared premises with the church in a town centre building and drew its pupils largely from Christian families who were members of the two local churches. However, this changed over the years with a growing intake from non-Christian families but the school retained its Christian character.

It was one of twenty-seven independent schools to be issued with a warning notice from the Department for Education in November 2017 that failed to meet its independent school standards. It noted its pupils were not developing respect for different faiths and beliefs, didn't have easy access to drinking water and the outdoor space was too small.

Its fees depended on the age but ranged from £370 a month for juniors and up to £455 a month for the older students. It closed on 27 April 2018 due to a change in legislation that made it difficult to maintain the independent choices the school could make, no longer having the freedom it once had, increase in running costs and falling numbers.
