= Finton House School =

School in Wandsworth, London, England

Coordinates: 51.4410°N 0.1656°W

Finton House School is a private primary school located in Wandsworth, London, England.

Finton House was founded in 1987 as a charitable trust.

== Alumni ==
- Louis Partridge
