= Dharma Primary School =

The Dharma Primary School

Location
- White House, Ladies Mile Road; Brighton, East Sussex, BN1 8TB; England; 50.864581°N 0.138656°W

Information
- Type: Independent
- Religious affiliation: Buddhist inspired
- Established: 1994
- Closed: 2020
- Department for Education URN: 114673 Tables
- Executive Head teacher: Lynne Weir
- Gender: Coeducational
- Age: 3 to 11
- Enrolment: ca. 80
- Website: http://www.dharmaschool.co.uk/

Dharma Primary School was the first primary school and nursery in Britain to offer an education based on Buddhist values. It celebrated its 20th anniversary in 2015. It was an independent school and nursery based in East Sussex, on the south east coast of England. The 14th Dalai Lama was a patron.

The Dharma Primary School educated around 80 children in a large historic house in Patcham, Brighton. Fees were £2,348 a term in 2015–16. Children of all abilities and backgrounds were eligible to attend. There were generally 10–20 children in each class with a teacher and an assistant.

The school closed in July 2020.

== History ==
The idea of founding a Dharma Primary School evolved from the family camps at Amaravati Buddhist Monastery in Hertfordshire in the mid-1980s. Early in the 90s this interaction between parents, children and members of the Buddhist monastery inspired a group of parents to meet in Brighton with the aim of opening the first Buddhist School for children in the U.K.

Dharma Primary School was founded by a group of parents in 1994, after two years of fund-raising. On 9 September 1994, the school opened its doors to four children in a house in Queen's Park, Brighton. On this day the school received blessings from founder patron, Luang Por Sumedho, a Buddhist monk and teacher, and blessings were also sent from the Dalai Lama, who later became a patron of the school. This was the first full-time school in Great Britain based on the Buddhist faith. By 2000 the co-educational school was teaching children between the ages of three and eleven. By 2005 the number of pupils stood at seventy, with almost equal numbers of boys and girls.

With the support of patrons including Noy Thomson (M.R. Saisvadi Svasti) and Peter Carey, Buddhists and founder trustees, the school moved to The White House, Patcham, in June 1995 with eleven children. A nursery and reception class and three mixed-age primary classes were later established.

The school closed in July 2020.

== Head teachers ==
- 1994–1998: Medhina Fright
- 1998–2002: Kevin Fossey
- 2002–2014: Peter Murdock
- 2014–2015: Deputy Heads in joint control
- 2015–January 2020: Clare Eddison
- 2020– January to July 2020: Lynne Weir
- 2020- January to March 2020: Head of School – Ruth O'Keefe

== Mindfulness in education ==
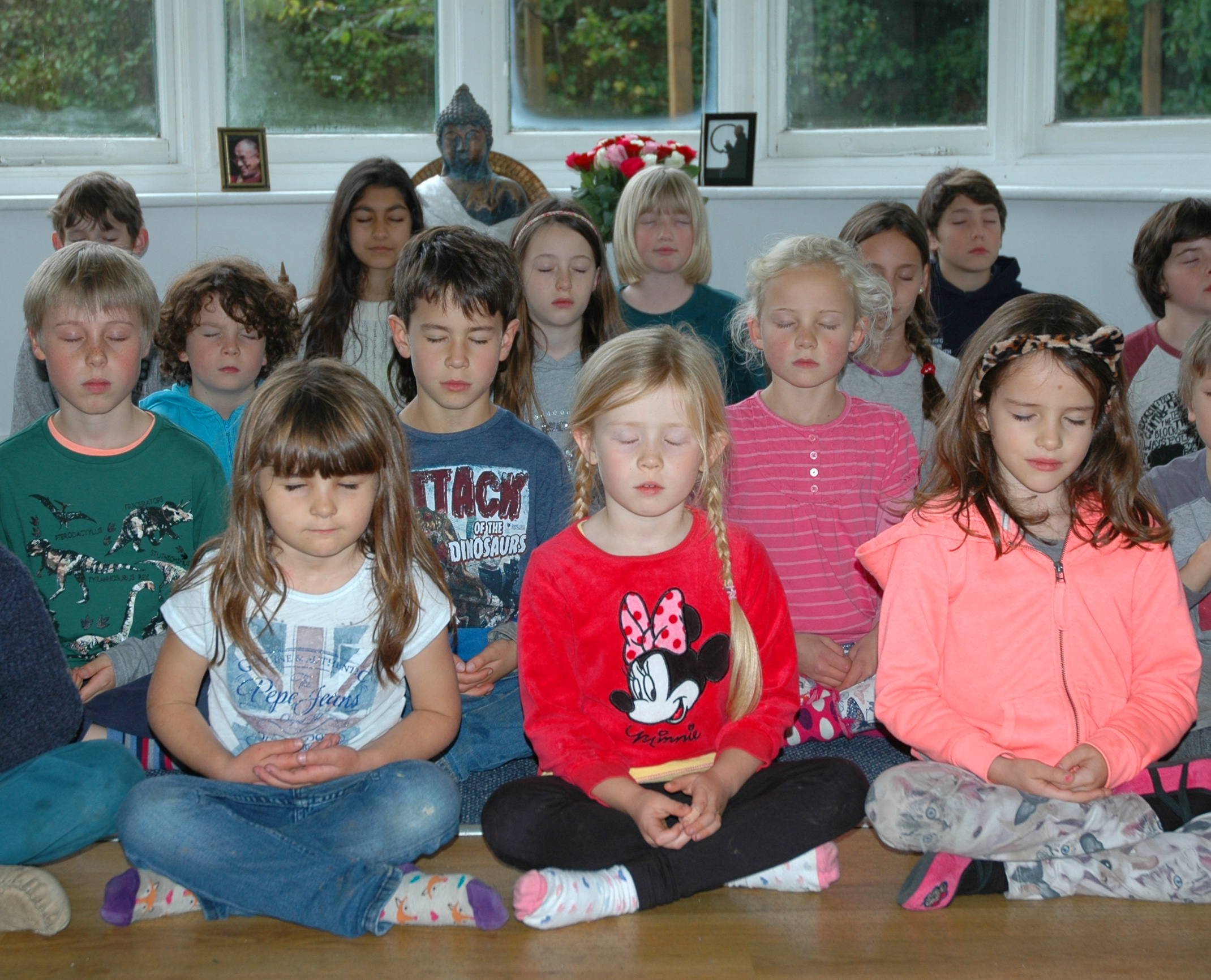

The school integrated short sessions of silent or guided meditation several times a week for young children and connects mindfulness with regular daily activities such as eating, working and playing as a way to develop patience, compassion and self-awareness. In daily meditation the older children were given a range of opportunities to reflect on and discuss experiences that have affected their inner world. On Fridays parents were invited to the school puja, during which there was usually quiet time for meditation, after which the children performed or showed some work, or a story was told. As well as mindfulness and meditation, yoga was taught to children, alongside mainstream lessons.
