= Mayville High School, Southsea =

Mayville High School

Location
- 35 St Simon's Road; Portsmouth, Hampshire, PO5 2PE; England; 50.7824°N 1.0815°W

Information
- Type: Private day school
- Motto: 1. Excellence through Nurture; 2. Quid Bene Facis Face (What you do, do well)
- Established: 1897
- Founder: Charlotte West
- Headteacher: Sarah George
- Staff: 120
- Gender: Co-educational
- Age: 2 to 16
- Enrolment: 480
- Houses: 3 (Nelson (Yellow), Cavell (Blue), Austen (Green))
- Colours: Blue, pink and white
- Affiliation: Independent Schools Association (UK)
- School Hymn: Chosen Way (A School Hymn)
- Website: www.mayvillehighschool.com

Mayville High School is an independent, co-educational day school in Southsea, Portsmouth, England.

== History ==
Mayville High School was founded in the home of Lottie West at 1 Gains Road in Portsmouth. The school moved to various locations before settling in its current premises.

Between 1911 and 1936, the school accepted boarding pupils, but they were later transferred to Charmandean Manor School in Worthing, West Sussex. In September 1936, it was reopened as a day school.

During the Second World War, when Portsmouth was heavily damaged during German bombings. Mayville was one of the few schools in England that were not evacuated.

In 1980 Mayville became a charitable trust.

Boys were formally admitted during the 1990s, though there had already been a small number attending since the end of the Second World War. The school is now co-educational.

== Academics ==
Mayville caters for children aged 2 to 16. Junior School pupils are generally given automatic entry into the Senior School, while new applicants must pass a test and an interview. The school caters to pupils of all abilities, offering specialised units for both "gifted and talented" children and those with learning differences.

In August 2021, 98% of Mayville High School pupils obtained five 9 to 4 grades, including the core subjects of Mathematics and English.

== Early years ==
The Early Years Foundation Stage at Mayville is divided into three areas: Swans, Kestrels and Lower 1

=== Nursery ===
The nursery at Mayville is housed on the Kenilworth premises with the Pre-Prep and Junior departments.

All children in the Foundation Stage are taught Music, Physical Education (PE), Dance and French. Children can play outside and explore a garden area. Mayville runs trips on foot or by minibus.

=== Lower 1 ===
Lower 1 is Mayville High School's reception class and is deemed the first proper year of school. From Lower 1 onwards, pupils wear uniforms, participate in whole-school events.

== Pre-Prep and Junior School ==
Teachers in this part of the school are specialists in topics including English, mathematics, science, history, geography, religious education, art, IT, music, physical education, drama, and foreign languages.

== Senior School ==
In the Senior School, pupils also take CAT tests, or Cognitive Abilities Tests, which are used throughout the school as baseline testing.

== Dyslexia ==
The school runs the Harden-Davies Dyslexia Unit, catering to dyslexia, dyscalculia, dyspraxia, and mild speech and language disorders. Children aged 4 to 16 can receive an individual program of support to help them overcome their particular difficulties.

Wyvern House was opened in September 2023 and is an alternative provision catering for pupils mainly with ASD, ADHD and SEMH. A multi-disciplinary team works alongside SEN teachers to educate pupils between the ages of 11 - 16.

== Performing Arts ==
Mayville High School runs dedicated departments for Drama, Music, and Dance, and has facilities on the school premises for rehearsals and performances. Pupils have opportunities for one-to-one classes in singing, acting, and public speaking, as well as collaborative work in Mayville's orchestra, choir, or band. Every year, Mayville pupils can participate in Dance Live.

The school launched the Mayville Academy of Performing Arts (MAPA) in April 2018. The academy offers courses in Dance, Singing, Drama, and Technical Theatre, all of which conclude in stage performances for parents in the school's theatre studios, or for the wider public at nearby venues like The Kings Theatre and Portsmouth Guildhall.

A number of Mayville High School pupils have gained LAMDA qualifications, and performed at a professional level in West End productions.

== Sports ==
Mayville's sports facilities encompass athletics, badminton, cricket, football, gymnastics, netball, rounders, rugby, swimming, tennis, trampolining, and volleyball. Included among these facilities is a 20-acre field in Southsea, used for rugby, football, and cricket practices and matches.

Internal sporting competitions take place between Mayville's three houses: Austen, Cavell, and Nelson. Mayville also competes with other schools on both a local and county-wide level.

The Mayville Sports Academy offers extra-curricular opportunities to pupils who want to improve their fitness, skills, and teamwork. The academy runs a number of summer courses.

== Staff ==
Mayville uses general classroom teachers in the junior school and specialist teachers in the senior school, as is common practice in the United Kingdom. Alongside teachers, the school employs a range of support staff.
