= St Christopher's School, Bristol =

School in Bristol, England

Coordinates: 51.47684°N 2.61425°W

St Christopher's School
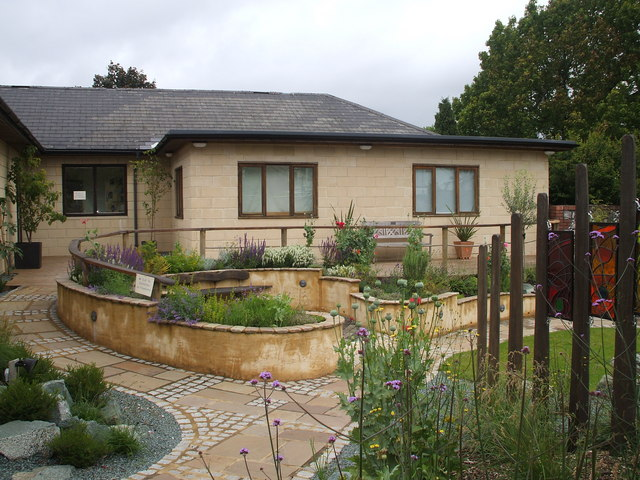
- The sensory garden at the school

Location
- Carisbrooke Lodge, Westbury Park; Bristol; England

Information
- Type: Independent school Special Needs School
- Established: 1945
- Closed: 2020
- Specialist: learning difficulties
- Department for Education URN: 109342 Tables
- Age: 7 to 25
- Enrolment: 49
- Website: http://www.the-aurora-group.com/stchris

St Christopher's School (later known as Aurora St Christopher's School) was located in Bristol, England. It was a residential independent school for around 50 children and young people aged 7 to 25, who had severe and complex learning difficulties, or profound and multiple learning difficulties. They all had specific requirements for their care and education.

Many of the pupils had language and communication disorders, some had physical disabilities and some displayed challenging behaviour. Some of the additional conditions were autism spectrum disorder, epilepsy, Rett syndrome and Angelman syndrome.

In December 2015 it was announced that the school was to close, but in January 2016 it was taken over by The Aurora Group, allowing it to remain open. However the school did close in 2020. It was declared an asset of community value in 2024.

Grace House, a teaching block at the school built in 1965 and designed by Alec F French and Partners, is a grade II listed building.
