= International Greenwich Olympiad =

International STEAM project competition

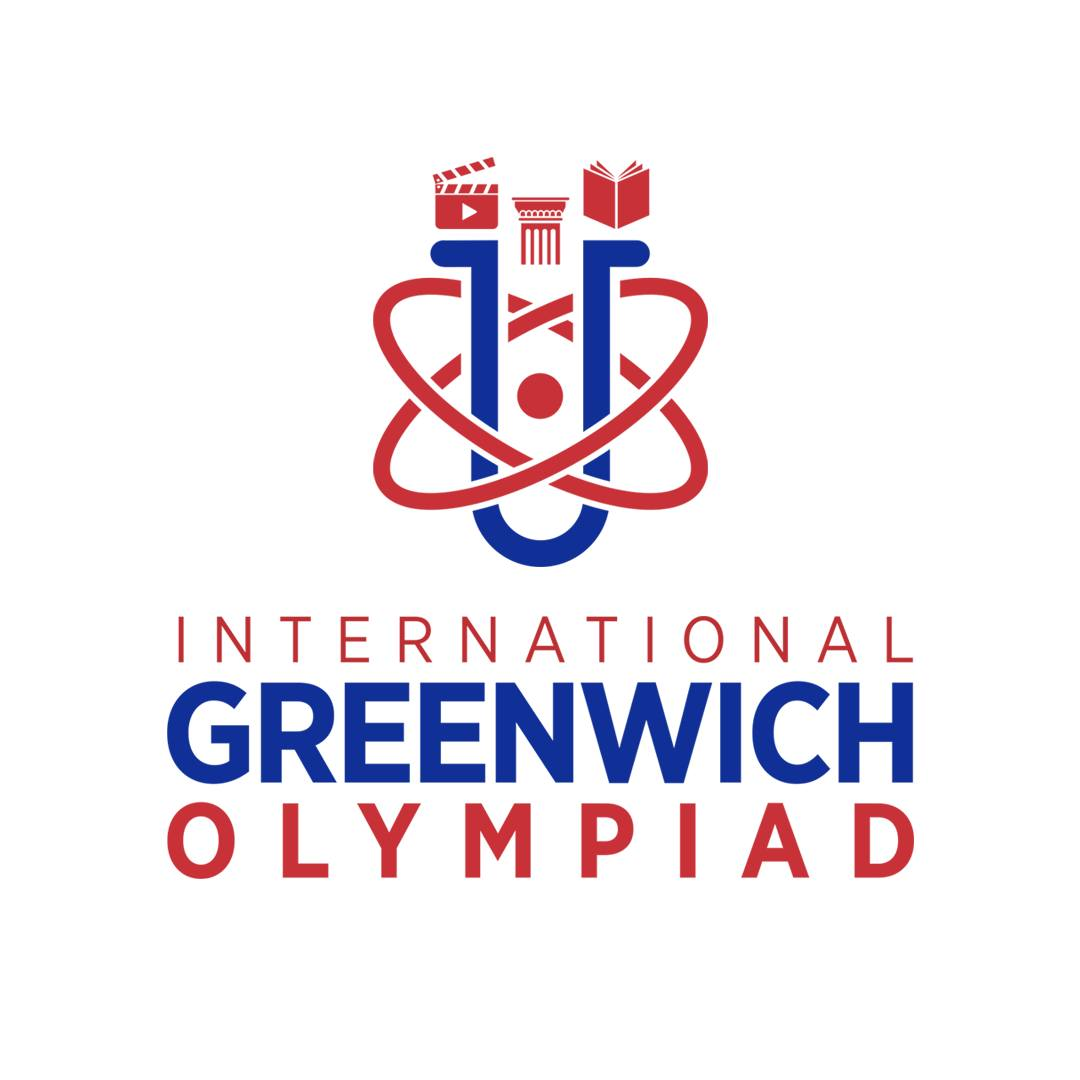
- Status: Active
- Genre: Science and STEAM competition
- Frequency: Annual
- Location: United Kingdom
- Country: United Kingdom
- Inaugurated: 2022
- Organiser: North London Grammar School
- Website: igolondon.co.uk

The International Greenwich Olympiad (IGO) is an annual international project-based competition in science, technology, engineering, arts and mathematics (STEAM) for school students, organised and hosted by North London Grammar School in London, United Kingdom.

Open to students aged approximately 10–19, the Olympiad invites research and creative projects across a broad range of STEAM disciplines. The event combines academic judging with lectures, workshops and cultural activities, and has been described as a platform for scientific innovation and intercultural exchange.

In 2025, North London Grammar School received the Independent Schools Association (ISA) Award for International Provision, with judges citing the Olympiad as an example of global collaboration and educational impact.

The Olympiad is part of an international network of affiliated science fairs and is recognised by the youth science organisation MILSET.

== History ==
=== Origins and early development ===
The contest is organised and hosted by North London Grammar School, an independent day and boarding school in Hendon, north London. References to IGO medal winners appear in documentation from 2019 onwards, indicating early iterations of the competition prior to the launch of the current full-scale format. During the COVID-19 pandemic in 2020 and 2021, the Olympiad adopted online and hybrid participation models.

=== Launch of the current physical format (2022) ===
The modern residential, London-based format began in 2022 after the easing of travel restrictions. The inaugural physical edition combined exhibitions at NLGS and partner university venues and established a week-long model featuring academic sessions and cultural excursions.

Published 2022 results include a gold-medal project on hydrogen-powered aircraft submitted by NLGS students.

=== Expansion (2023) ===
The 2023 Olympiad saw significant growth, with 356 students from 41 countries presenting 224 projects. Queen Mary University of London (QMUL) became a principal partner, providing exhibition halls and accommodation. The programme incorporated excursions to Cambridge and major London cultural institutions.

=== Consolidation and Oxford link (2024) ===
In 2024, 449 students from 134 schools in 48 countries presented over 300 projects. The opening ceremony was held at Oxford Town Hall, attended by civic and academic representatives. Cultural events such as a culture night supported the Olympiad’s aim of fostering international understanding.

A notable 2024 gold-medal project investigated porous cellulose-amine materials for CO₂ capture, produced by a Slovak student under university supervision.

=== Largest edition to date (2025) ===
The 2025 edition featured 522 students from 53 countries presenting 356 projects across 13 categories, making it the largest Olympiad to date.

The opening ceremony again took place at Oxford Town Hall, followed by exhibitions and judging at QMUL.

Following the event, the Independent Schools Association awarded NLGS its 2025 Award for International Provision, citing the Olympiad’s global reach.

=== The 2026 competition ===
The 2026 Olympiad brought together 362 finalists from 53 countries, selected from 1,103 registered students worldwide. The programme included an opening ceremony in Oxford, project exhibitions and judging at Queen Mary University of London, and an awards ceremony at King's College London. The competition programme comprised 15 categories, including separate art and photography categories and dedicated categories for STEM lesson presentation and STEM storytelling.

Projects continued to address themes connected to the Sustainable Development Goals. International reporting highlighted medal-winning entries including a Ugandan fruit-picking robot demonstrating Newton's laws of motion, the Bahamian SmartSteps mobility cane for visually impaired users, and the Emirati Smart Irrigation Train, which combined Internet of Things, solar-energy and smart-agriculture technologies. South Korean participant Won Lee was also reported to have received a silver medal.

== Organisation and governance ==
IGO is owned and organised by North London Grammar School. Strategic direction is provided by an advisory board composed of international academics, industry figures and educational specialists.

IGO is recognised by MILSET and works with affiliated national and regional science fairs which nominate top projects for international competition.

== Format and participation ==
=== Eligibility and participation modes ===
Eligibility extends to students aged approximately 10–19 working individually or in teams of up to three. Each project is supervised by an adult mentor aged over 20.

Two participation tracks are available:

- Residential track: a week-long programme in London including project presentations and cultural visits.
- Online track: pre-recorded presentations with live remote Q&A sessions.

=== Categories ===
As of 2026, the Olympiad comprises 15 competition categories:

- Artificial intelligence
- Engineering
- Computer sciences
- Energy
- Environmental sciences
- Health sciences
- Social sciences
- STEM lesson presentation
- Short film
- Art
- Photography
- Sumo Challenge
- Performing arts
- Public speaking
- STEM storytelling

=== Judging ===
Judging panels include academics and industry professionals, with over 100 judges participating in some years. A published rubric allocates scores across creativity, methodology, data analysis, presentation quality and student understanding.

Online presentations are overseen by trained moderators who verify identities, manage timing and ensure academic integrity.

== Awards and notable projects ==
IGO awards gold, silver and bronze medals in each category, along with honourable mentions.

Notable recognised projects include:

- a hydrogen-powered aircraft engineering project (gold, 2022)
- a CO₂ capture materials project (gold, 2024)
- environmental projects from Indonesia receiving multiple medals
- short films Return and Her Blues (gold, 2024).

Schools with recurring medal success include Shanghai High School International Division, Galaxy International School (Ghana), and Triad Math and Science Academy (United States).

== Affiliated fairs and partners ==
IGO collaborates with a global network of regional science fairs whose top projects qualify for participation.

Examples include:

- SOLACYT / ExpoCiencias (Mexico)
- MOSTRATEC (Brazil)
- REDCOLSI (Colombia)
- IYSA (Indonesia)
- VILIPO (Lithuania)
- INFOMATRIX (Romania)
- AMAVET (Slovakia)
- I-FEST (Tunisia)

QMUL is the main higher education partner, while Oxford Town Hall has hosted opening ceremonies.

== Media coverage ==
IGO maintains an active media presence through press releases, social media and a dedicated YouTube channel. Local media in London regularly highlight the Olympiad’s scale and NLGS’s international outreach.

Internationally, the Olympiad is widely covered by school newsletters and regional education news, often framing medals as national achievements in STEM education.

== See also ==
- Science Olympiad
- North London Grammar School
