= Getter's Talmud Torah =

Coordinates: 51.5749°N 0.0833°W

Getters Talmud Torah

Location
- 86 Amhurst Park; London, N16 5AR

Information
- School type: Independent school
- Religious affiliation: Judaism
- Established: 21 January 2000
- Closed: 20 July 2018
- Local authority: Hackney
- Department for Education URN: 132041 Tables
- Ofsted: Reports
- Head teacher: Rabbi P Ginsbury
- Gender: Boys
- Age: 3 to 14
- Enrollment: 228
- Capacity: 200 (officially)

Getters Talmud Torah also known as Beis Shlomo Cheder was an Orthodox Jewish private school in Stamford Hill, London. The school was associated with the Union of Orthodox Hebrew Congregations and catered for boys aged 3 to 13.

The head of the school was Rabbi Moshe Shmuel Rotenberg, the Kossoner Rabbi of London.

== History ==
The school was founded in 2000.

The school stopped teaching secular subjects other than English and maths in January 2017, providing pupils' parents with a contract for them to sign accepting responsibility for their children's secular educations. Boys were also not taught about women's contributions to society or about other cultures.

The school received four full inspections from Ofsted, three of which were rated "inadequate". The school was closed on 20 July 2018 following a deregistration order from the Department for Education.
