= Hollygirt School =

Location
- Elm Avenue; Nottingham, NG3 4GF; England; 52°57′52″N 1°08′57″W

Information
- Type: Private day school
- Established: 1877
- Department for Education URN: 122912 Tables
- Head Teacher: Ms R Purdy
- Gender: Girls and Boys
- Age: Year 6 to Year 11
- Enrolment: 220~
- Colours: Green, Red
- Website: www.hollygirt.co.uk

Hollygirt School is an independent school near the centre of Nottingham, England for girls and boys years 6 to 11.

== History ==
Hollygirt School was founded in 1877 and moved to Elm Avenue in 1913. The name "Hollygirt" is said to have originated from its former premises at 82 Addison Street which had a holly hedge. Garfield House, the main Senior School building, was built in 1881, and used to be a convent. In September 2012 the school re-admitted boys. Following a consultation process with all stakeholders in January 2014, the decision was made that Hollygirt School would become fully coeducational from September 2014. As a charity the school's accounts can be inspected on the charity commission website under the name ' The Rhonda Jessop education charity'. Accounts show that the school ran at a loss from August 2014 to June 2017

== School Structure ==
Hollygirt consists of pupils from Year 6 to Year 11

== Core Subjects ==
These three subjects are compulsory for all students
Mathematics
English Literature
English Language

== Science ==
Biology
Chemistry
Physics
Computer Science

== Other Subjects ==
Art
Religious Studies
Geography
History
Music
Drama and Theatre Arts
Food and Nutrition
Design and Technology Business

== Languages ==
French
Spanish
