= Hertford Prep =

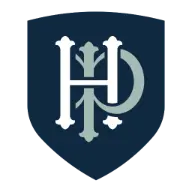
- Logo for Hertford Prep

Location
- St. Mary's Lane; Hertingfordbury, Hertfordshire, SG14 2LX; England; 51°47′23″N 0°05′51″W

Information
- Former name: St Joseph's In The Park
- Type: Independent Prep School
- Motto: Ora et Labora (Pray and Work)
- Religious affiliation: None
- Denomination: Inter-/ non-denominational
- Established: 1898
- Department for Education URN: 117629 Tables
- Chair: Elliot Lipton
- Headmaster: Mrs Emily Jenner
- Staff: 28 (2011)
- Gender: Co-Educational
- Age: 2 to 11
- Enrolment: 137 (2025)
- Capacity: 205
- Colours: Blue & White
- Affiliation: Independent Schools Council (ISC); Independent Association of Prep Schools (IAPS); Mill Hill Education Group
- ISI: yes
- Website: hertfordprep.org.uk

Hertford Prep (formerly St Joseph's in the Park) is an independent co-educational preparatory day school catering for pupils aged 2 to 11. The school is based in the grounds of Hertingfordbury Park near Hertford, Hertfordshire, England. The school became part of the Mill Hill Education Group in 2021. It changed its name in 2025 following a rebranding initiative.

== History ==
The school dates back to 1898, and was founded by the Sisters of Mercy from St Joseph's Convent in Chelsea, who established a small day and boarding school in Hertford, opposite the Catholic Church in St John's Street. The Sisters moved the school to the Hertingfordbury Park estate in the 1950s, using the house and parkland in 1947, and building some purpose-built classrooms by 1957. The Sisters relinquished from managing the school in 1983. Later, the school became privately owned, adopted the name St Joseph's in the Park in 1996, and became a charitable trust in 2006.

The main building in Hertingfordbury Park, which is residential, has 17th- and 18th-century architectural features, recorded in the National Heritage List for England. Local history archives have recorded the Sisters' school in St John's Street, and their move to the estate in mid-century.

In 2021 the school joined the Mill Hill Education Group, and in November 2025 it rebranded as Hertford Prep with a new crest and uniform.

== Site and facilities ==
Hertford Prep is located within the 15 acres of the Hertingfordbury Park estate. The area includes woodland, which is used for outdoor learning, and includes a "Forest School" facility. Other facilities include sports pitches, a school hall for music and drama, and specialist classrooms for teaching science, computing and art.

== Curriculum ==
The school provides a comprehensive preparatory curriculum, covering core subjects, creative arts, sport and outdoor education. Pupils typically transfer at the age of 11 to a wide range of senior schools, some achieving scholarships.

== Governance and affiliations ==
The school is a member of the Independent Schools Council and the Independent Association of Prep Schools and is inspected by the Independent Schools Inspectorate (ISI).

== Inspection reports ==
2007 Ofsted inspection: St Joseph's in the Park "successfully meets its aims of ensuring each pupil's academic and personal development" and "provides a good quality of education and care with some outstanding features". The curriculum was "good with an outstanding range of extra-curricular activities" (p. 3), and was supported by specialist teaching in art, music and languages. Inspectors praised the Woodlands Learning Support Centre for "excellent opportunities for pupils with specific learning difficulties" (p. 4). Teaching quality was "good overall with some outstanding," and pupils' spiritual, moral, social and cultural development was "outstanding," with behaviour "exemplary" (pp. 6–7). Welfare, health and safety were judged as good. The school met all Independent School Standards with the exception of full implementation of its safeguarding policy and the absence of a designated medical room (p. 7-9). Funded nursery education was rated "outstanding," with "exceptional teaching and rapid progress through the Foundation Stage" (pp. 11–12).

2014 ISI Integrated Inspection: The pupils' achievement and learning was rated as excellent, supported by "high-quality teaching and a vibrant curriculum". Pupils made rapid academic progress, particularly within the Woodlands provision (p. 5). Pastoral care and leadership were both judged to be excellent, and the school fully met all regulatory standards (pp. 8–12).

2017 ISI Regulatory Compliance Inspection: An inspection (13–14 September 2017) confirmed that the school met almost all standards and Early Years Framework requirements. All standards relating to curriculum, governance and premises were met; a safeguarding documentation issue relating to barred-list checks for a few visiting staff was corrected soon after (p. 6). Leadership and management were described as effective and supportive of the pupils' wellbeing (pp. 5–7).

2022 ISI Focused Compliance and Educational Quality Inspection: Between 17 and 20 May 2022, the ISI confirmed that all Independent School Standards and Early Years requirements were met. Pupils' academic and other achievements were good and their personal development excellent (pp. 8–11), with "outstanding behaviour" and communication skills. Early Years and SEND provision were "highly effective," and inspectors recommended reducing "reliance on worksheets" to encourage creativity (p. 8).

2025 ISI Routine Inspection: An ISI inspection (17–19 June 2025), shortly before the school's rebrand to Hertford Prep, confirmed full compliance and commended the leadership under the Mill Hill School Foundation for "effective strategic oversight and a strong safeguarding culture". The curriculum was "broad and balanced," with Early Years and SEND support "highly individualised" (pp. 7–8). Pupils demonstrated "exemplary behaviour and confidence" (p. 9), and safeguarding systems were "fully compliant and proactive" (p. 13). Inspectors advised strengthening economic and financial education (p. 11).

Overall, the inspection evidence from 2007 to 2025 shows sustained evidence of compliance with independent-school standards, a consistent level of high-quality teaching, and effective leadership and governance throughout the school's transition to Hertford Prep.

== See also ==
- Mill Hill School
