= East Ham Baptist Church =

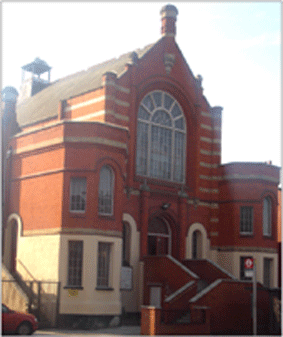
- EHBC in 2007
- East Ham Baptist Church
- 51.5389°N 0.0447°E
- Location: East Ham, London
- Country: England
- Denomination: Baptist
- Churchmanship: Evangelical, charismatic
- Website: www.easthambaptist.org.uk

History
- Founded: 1895

Architecture
- Architect: Edgar Stones
- Completed: 1901

Clergy
- Pastor: Jeremiah Dawood

East Ham Baptist Church is situated in Plashet Grove, East Ham, a mainly residential area of the London Borough of Newham, England.

== History ==
In 1895 the London Baptist Association (LBA) promoted services in East Ham, then a fast-growing dormitory suburb. A temporary iron building at the corner of Katherine Road and Victoria Avenue housed the first congregation. R. Sloven became the first minister from 1896 to 1908.

In 1901 the congregation moved to a new building in Plashet Grove, designed by Edgar Stones, with a 1000-seater sanctuary, surrounded by halls and rooms. By 1903, membership was 972, one of the strongest in the then East Ham Borough. In 1908, Charles Howe led a team of East Ham members to start Bonny Downs Baptist Church situated in the southern part of East Ham. He stayed there for 53 years.

Worship, preaching, programmes and activities continued under the leadership of F. Williams from 1909–1919 and then returning from 1925–1929 after the ministry of F. C. Buck (1919–1924). Church attendance weakened after World War I (1914–1918), World War II (1939–1945) and population movement.

The slow decline of the 1930s accelerated during the 1939–1945 war and continued inexorably through a succession of ministers and then lay pastors. Membership was 228 in 1941 and only 52 in 1951.

== Modern congregation ==
Humphrey Vellacott came in 1967. His first morning congregation was 6, and 14 people in the evening. He left 100 members, a morning congregation of 150–200, evening 70–80, and a prayer and bible study of 50–60 of 'converts or restored back sliders' and a reshaped building and a team of young ministers working in East London Baptist churches.

With the surrounding population changing fast through immigration, particularly from Africa and Asia, the congregation became multi-racial but continued to record a steady 100 membership from the 1980s into the 2000s.

Roy Scarsbrook, joined and followed Humphrey Vellacott in September 1983 staying until August 2000, emphasising evangelism and eventually becoming one of a group of supported overseas missionaries, as he went to Poland.

Tony Watts, a New Zealander, came initially for a six-month interim pastorate but stayed to 2008, and faced a transient situation within a multi-faith, multi-racial environment.

After a year without a minister, the current minister Jeremiah Dawood took up this post in May 2009. The mission statement of the church is: "East Ham Baptist Church is a multicultural, mission-focussed church. We seek to build up the body of Christ by encouraging and equipping the members to find and exercis e their gifts, and through this to touch the community both at home and abroad with the love of Christ."

== List of past ministers ==
Name	Dates
R. Sloven	1896–1908
F. Williams	1909–1919
F. C. Buck	1919–1924
F. Williams	1925–1929
Humphrey Vellacott	1967–1983
Roy Scarsbrook	1983–2000
Tony Watts	2000–2008
Jeremiah Dawood	2009–
