= Glendower Preparatory School =

Glendower Prep School

Location
- 86/87 Queen's Gate; South Kensington; London, SW7 5JX; England; 51.49397°N 0.17913°W

Information
- Type: Preparatory school
- Established: 1895
- Founders: Miss Lloyd and Miss Cornwall
- Local authority: Kensington and Chelsea
- Department for Education URN: 100508 Tables
- Headmistress: Ms Claire Boyd
- Gender: Girls
- Age: 3 to 11
- Enrolment: 292 (2026)
- Capacity: 310
- Colour: Purple
- Website: www.glendowerprep.org

Glendower Prep School is an independent preparatory school in South Kensington, London for girls aged 3 to 11.

== History ==
Glendower Prep was founded in 1895 by Miss Lloyd and Miss Cornwall at 103A Fulham Road and was originally called "Cornwall and Lloyd School". The school shared premises with Dunn & Co. the hatters and The Sports Motor Car Co.

At some point between 1902 and 1918, the school moved to 5 Glendower Road and changed its name to Glendower School. After 2 years in Glendower Road, the school relocated to 25 - 27 Cromwell Road.

The school remained at this site from 1920 until 1939 when the Second World War forced an evacuation to Cornwall. Glendower moved into 87 Queen's Gate in 1947 where it has remained with some extension and expansion until the present day.

As of 2026 the headmistress is Ms Claire Boyd, succeeding Mrs Nina Kingsmill Moore, who was headmistress from 2020 to 2024.

== Etymology ==
The name Glendower itself is an anglicised pronunciation of the Welsh prince's name Owain Glyndŵr.

== Notable former pupils ==
- Gayatri Devi of Jaipur
- Patricia Ford
- Carmen Ejogo
- Koo Stark
- Harper Beckham
