= Bassett House School =

Location
- 60 Bassett Road; London, W10 6JP; England; 51.5182°N 0.2176°W

Information
- Type: Preparatory school
- Motto: Latin: Quisque Pro Sua Parte ("Each according to his portion and share")
- Established: 1947
- Local authority: Kensington & Chelsea
- Department for Education URN: 100513 Tables
- Chair of Governors: Aatif Hassan
- Head: Christopher Woodward
- Gender: Mixed
- Age: 2 to 11
- Enrolment: 150
- Colours: Blue and white
- Contact No: 020 8969 0313
- Website: http://www.bassetths.org.uk/

Bassett House School is a coeducational preparatory school for children aged 2 to 11 years old based in Notting Hill, London, UK. Bassett House has two sister schools, Orchard House School in Chiswick and Prospect House School in Putney. All three schools take both boys and girls from the age of 3 or 4 until the time they leave for their next senior or intermediate preparatory schools. Bassett House School was founded in 1947.

== The building ==
Bassett House is located in Notting Hill, in proximity to Ladbroke Grove and Latimer Road. Bassett House was built towards the end of the 19th century as a large family house.

The entire building was substantially rebuilt in 2001. The school premises include the church hall at St Helen's Church, just around the corner from 60 Bassett Road, providing an assembly hall with a stage and gymnasium, three classrooms, a kitchen and a garden. The Nursery School and Reception classrooms are located at 73 St Helen's Gardens, a newly developed specialist EYFS building.

The school has a playground and outdoor learning area. Children are taken on most days to a nearby park, Kensington Memorial Park, for recreation, with games lessons taking place at The Westway Sports Centre.

== Notable alumni ==
- Derek Abbott, scientist
- Randy Gerber, theme park executive
