= Pembridge Hall School =

Location
- 10 & 18 Pembridge Square; London, W2 4EH; England; 51.51127°N 0.19546°W

Information
- Type: Preparatory day school
- Established: 1979
- Local authority: Kensington and Chelsea
- Department for Education URN: 100531 Tables
- Head: Sophie Banks
- Gender: Girls
- Age: 4 to 11
- Enrolment: 400~
- Colours: Grey, Red
- Website: www.pembridgehall.co.uk

Pembridge Hall is a non-selective preparatory school for girls located in Notting Hill, London, England. It is part of the Inspired Education Group.

== History ==
The origins of Pembridge Hall School stem from a convent school, 'Our Lady of Sion' which was founded in Chepstow Villas, Notting Hill in 1979 by the Sisters of Sion.

In 1980, the school moved to 18 Pembridge Square, where the Lower School is currently based and became known for the first time as Pembridge Hall.

In 2003, the Middle and Upper School expanded into number 10 Pembridge Square.

In 2023, the school was acquired by the Inspired Education Group.

== Admissions ==
Pembridge Hall is a non-selective school. Applications for Kindergarten are processed by calendar month to ensure an even distribution of birthdays throughout the year. Applications for older pupils are subject to assessment and interview.

== Academics ==
Pupils study the full range of National Curriculum subjects as well as learning Philosophy and having the opportunity to take LAMDA lessons. Sport and the Arts feature strongly on the curriculum as well as a wide variety of both day and residential trips.

The 2010 ISI inspection report commended the school for its excellence in teaching, pastoral care and relationship with parents.

== Senior School Transition ==
Upon leaving Pembridge Hall, pupils typically gain entry to a range of London day schools including Godolphin and Latymer School, Francis Holland School, More House, Queen's College, London and St Paul's Girls' School. A number of pupils move on to boarding schools, including St Mary's School, Ascot and Wycombe Abbey.
