= Ashbourne College =

Coordinates: 51°30′11″N 0°11′24″W

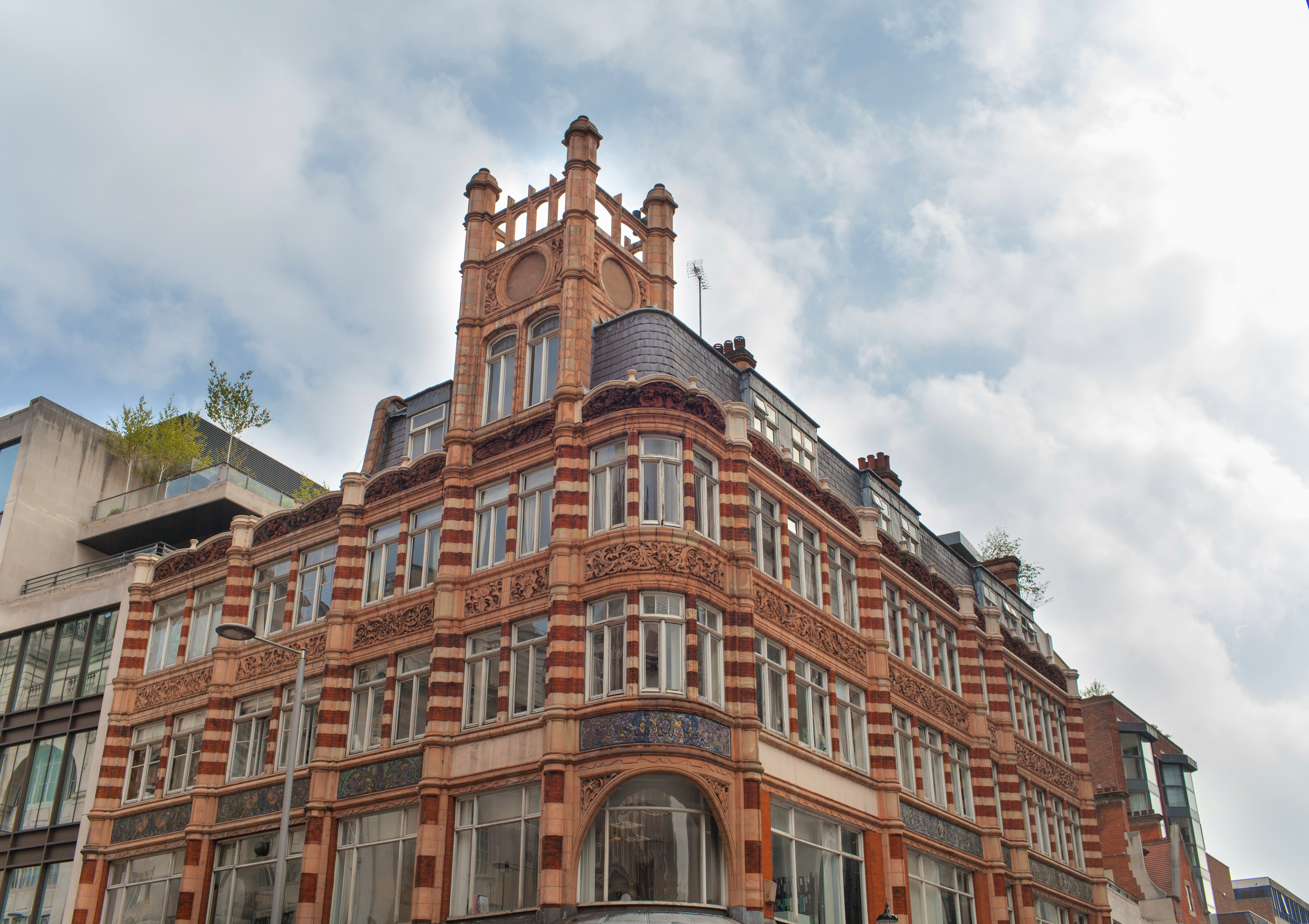
- Young Street Building

Location
- 17 Old Court Place; Kensington; London, W8 4PL; England

Information
- Type: Private school
- Established: 1981
- Department for Education URN: 100537 Tables
- Ofsted: Reports
- Principal: Mr Michael Kirby
- Gender: Coeducational
- Age: 13+
- Enrolment: 270 as of September 2024
- Website: https://www.ashbournecollege.co.uk/

Ashbourne College is a private sixth form college located in Kensington, London, England. It was founded in 1981 by its current principal, Michael Kirby. The college offers A-level and GCSE courses in a coeducational environment and is a member of the Council for Independent Education (CIFE). The student body comprises approximately 60% domestic (UK-based) students and 40% international students.

Ashbourne College offers a broad range of academic programmes and has reported achieving an average of approximately 51% A*– A grades at A-level over the past decade. The college is also ranked in the top 2.5% of UK schools for value-added progress, categorised as ‘well above average’ by the Department of Education. While most students enrol in a standard two-year A-level course, Ashbourne also provides retake courses. On average, students taking retake courses improve their grades by 1.5 per subject entry upon completion.

== Environment ==
Ashbourne College operates with small class sizes and a teaching format intended to offer higher levels of individual attention and to promote student participation. Students and teachers are typically on a first-name basis, which the college describes as supporting a collaborative and informal learning environment. Each student is assigned a personal tutor who monitors academic progress, mock exam results, and attendance. Tutors provide individual academic guidance and support through the university application process, including preparation for the Universities and Colleges Admissions Service (UCAS) submissions.

== Location ==
The college is situated in central London, within the Royal Borough of Kensington and Chelsea. The college is located near Kensington Gardens, Hyde Park, and several cultural institutions including the Natural History Museum, the Victoria and Albert Museum, and the Royal Albert Hall. High Street Kensington Underground Station provides nearby access to the London transport network.

== Courses ==
Ashbourne College offers multiple academic programmes including:

- Two-year A-level courses
- 18-month A-level courses starting in January
- One-year intensive A-level and retake options
- One-year and two-year GCSE pathways

The GCSE curriculum includes core subjects: English Language, English Literature, Mathematics, Science (Double Award), and a modern European language, with a range of optional subjects on offer as well as PSHEE and physical education. The college also runs Easter Revision courses, open to both current and external students. Students may choose from more than 25 A-level subjects, and lessons are typically taught in two-hour sessions with a short break, and teaching time averages around six hours per subject each week.

== Ofsted rating ==
Ashbourne College was rated Outstanding in full Ofsted inspections conducted in December 2021 and again in November 2024. Inspectors evaluated all major categories, including overall effectiveness, quality of education, behaviour and attitudes, personal development, leadership and management, and sixth-form provision, as outstanding. The reports highlighted the quality of teaching, student motivation, and the college's support in preparing students for university progression. Ofsted inspectors stated in their 2024 report that "pupils display exemplary behaviours and attitudes to their work and to others. The school, thus, has an extraordinarily happy, calm and purposeful environment. Pupils come from a wide range of countries and cultures."

== Specialised university-entry programmes ==
Ashbourne College offers dedicated university pathway programmes for entry into Oxford and Cambridge, engineering, finance, law, medicine and natural sciences. Each programme is coordinated by a subject specialist who also helps students with the UCAS process. These programmes include weekly sessions such as workshops, seminars, and mock interviews, along with support for entrance examinations (e.g. BioMedical Admissions Test, University Clinical Aptitude Test, Test of Mathematics for University Admission) and portfolio preparation where relevant.

== Extra-curricular activities ==
The college offers a range of extracurricular activities, and as stated by Ofsted, “The school encourages pupils to take on responsibilities.” The college offers a range of extra-curricular clubs, including Model United Nations, music, creative writing, football, and many more. Additional cultural and recreational activities are scheduled throughout the year and have included visits to escape rooms, art exhibitions, and international trips to European cities.

Ofsted noted that "pupils have opportunities to participate in trips to places in the UK, Europe and further afield and to engage in meaningful volunteering work." The academic year typically concludes with a student-led event, The Revue, showcasing performances and creative work in music, theatre, fashion, and the visual arts.

== Fees and scholarships ==
As of the 2025–2026 academic year, tuition fees are £12,650 per term for UK students and £13,750 per term for international students. Fees apply to both GCSE and A-level programmes. The college offers partial scholarships, primarily for high-performing applicants in subjects such as Music, Drama, or STEM, based on academic records and entrance assessments.
