= The Hampshire School, Chelsea =

Coordinates: 51.4871°N 0.1715°W

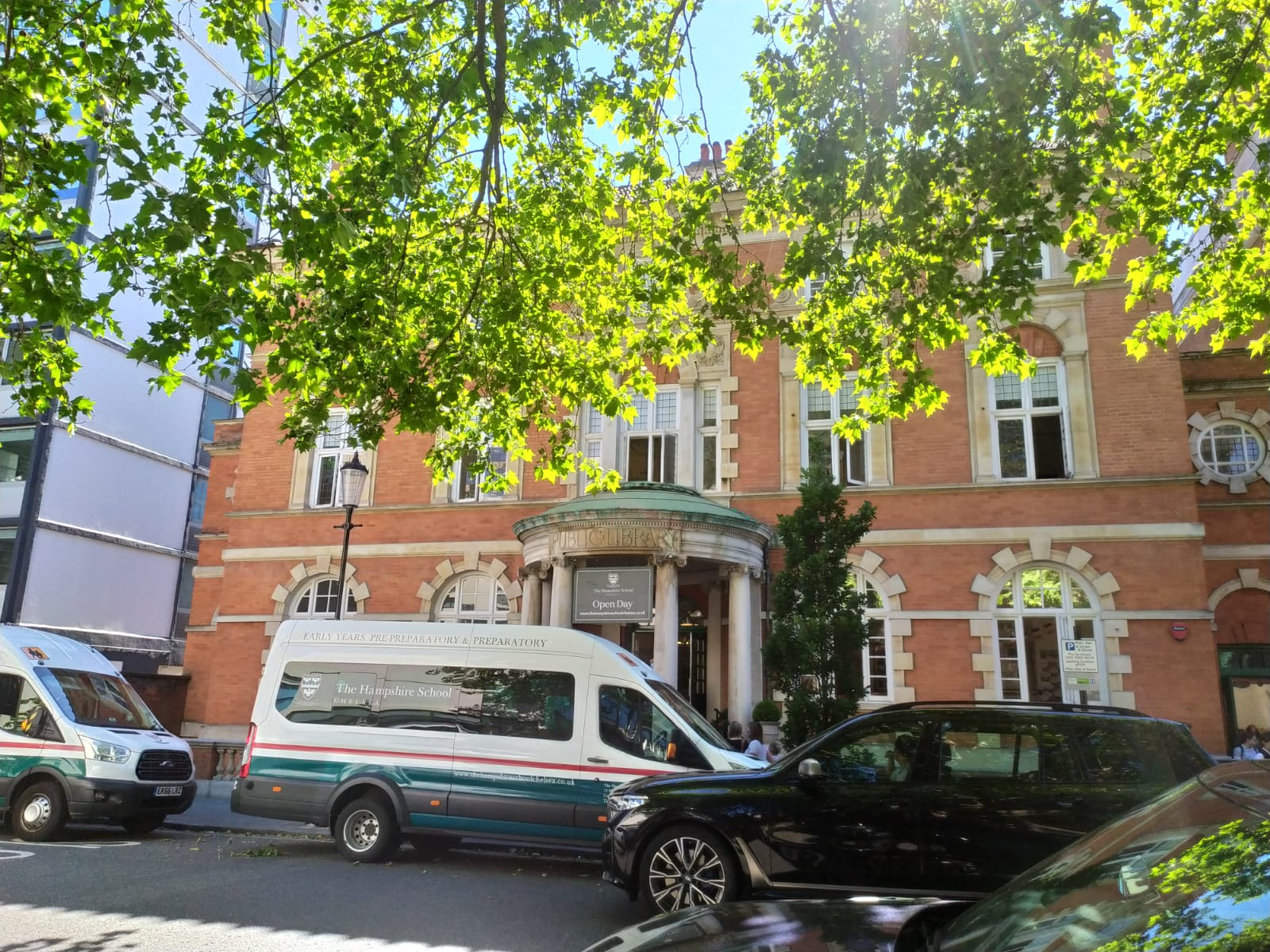
- The Hampshire School, Chelsea, London

Location
- 15 Manresa Road; Chelsea; London, SW3 6NB

Information
- Type: Private Preparatory day school
- Motto: Alte spectemus - Aim High
- Established: 1928
- Local authority: Kensington & Chelsea
- Department for Education URN: 101163 Tables
- Head: Richard Lock
- Staff: ~50
- Gender: Co-educational
- Age: 3 to 11
- Enrolment: ~314
- Language: English
- Colour: Dark Green
- Website: http://www.thehampshireschoolchelsea.co.uk

The Hampshire School, Chelsea was a private preparatory school for 3–11-year-olds in Chelsea, London, the United Kingdom. The school teaches the National Curriculum of England. The school closed in July 2024.

== Early years ==
The children participate in a variety of specialist lessons each week, including: Gym, Art, Music, Drama, Dance, Ballet, Swimming and French. They also participate in a variety of school events, educational school trips and Forest School.

== Preparatory school ==
The Good Schools Guide has described the school, "Space is the overwhelming impression you get as you are shown round: no cramped stairways and classrooms in this central London school (what a welcome change from the norm); good sized walled garden, where all children can get some fresh air during break times. State of the art technology throughout."

== History ==
The Hampshire School, Chelsea is housed in the former Chelsea Library (a Grade II Listed building) in central London which also served as the library for King's College.

The school was founded in 1944 in Surrey by June Hampshire. The school soon moved to Knightsbridge and is now on two sites, the Early Years at 5 Wetherby Place, SW7 and the Main School at 15 Manresa Road, SW3. Mrs Hampshire's daughter Jane Box Grainger succeeded her mother as Headmistress in 1961.

== Staff ==
Richard Lock was the final Head who joined the school in September 2022.

== Philanthropy ==
The children have raised money for various charities, including Children in Need and Red Nose Day. In September 2015 in response to an appeal to help Syrian refugees the children and parents donated goods.

== Sources ==
- "News". thehampshireschoolchelsea.co.uk.
- "The Hampshire School, Chelsea, London". thehampshireschoolchelsea.co.uk.
