= North London Grammar School =

Independent primary and secondary day and boarding school in London, England

Location
- 110 Colindeep Lane; Hendon, Greater London, NW9 6HB; England; 51.59008°N 0.24085°W

Information
- Type: Private day and boarding
- Motto: Bonitas, Scientia, Disciplina (Goodness, Knowledge, Discipline)
- Established: 2006
- Department for Education URN: 134764 Tables
- Ofsted: Reports
- Headteacher: Fatih Adak
- Gender: Coeducational
- Age: 4 to 18
- Capacity: 330
- Website: northlondongrammar.com

North London Grammar School (NLGS) is a private, non-denominational day and boarding school for pupils aged 4–18 located in Hendon, in the London Borough of Barnet, London, England. The school offers primary and secondary education on a single campus and runs a one-year University Foundation Programme as an alternative to a traditional sixth form and A-levels.

The school was founded in 2006 as Wisdom School, an independent, non-denominational mixed school in Tottenham, north London. According to academic Paul Weller, the school was founded by the Axis Educational Trust, an organisation established in 1994 to support supplementary education for families of Turkish background. In 2010, Axis transferred responsibility for the school to a newly established company limited by guarantee and registered charity. As the school expanded, that charity purchased a former police training building in Hendon, north London, which opened in September 2014 as North London Grammar School.

Weller discusses the school in the context of educational initiatives associated with the Gülen movement, also known as Hizmet. He states that, while the Wisdom School did not publicly mention Gülen or Hizmet, after its transition to North London Grammar School the school's website described its founders—businesspeople and educators of Turkish background—as having been "personally inspired by the teachings of Hizmet".

NLGS is known internationally as the organiser and host of the International Greenwich Olympiad (IGO), a major global STEAM project competition involving students from more than 50 countries. In 2025, the school received the Independent Schools Association (ISA) Award for International Provision in recognition of the Olympiad.

== History ==
=== Wisdom School (2006–2014) ===
Wisdom School opened in 2006 in Tottenham, north London, on a site of approximately 6,000 square feet. Early Ofsted inspections reported a good standard of education and pastoral care.

Growing enrolment and the need for greater facilities led to the acquisition of a new campus.

=== Relocation to Hendon ===
In 2013 the school acquired a former police training centre on Colindeep Lane in Hendon. After renovation, the expanded 50,000 square foot campus opened in 2014 as North London Grammar School, offering primary and secondary education alongside new boarding provision.

A one-year University Foundation Programme (UFP), accredited by OCN London, was later introduced for students aged 16–18 as an alternative pathway to university entry, instead of an in-house sixth form and A Level provision.

== Campus and facilities ==
Facilities include:

- specialist and general classrooms
- fully equipped science laboratories
- ICT suites and building-wide wireless internet
- art and design studios
- library and study spaces
- indoor sports facilities.

The school also uses external venues for competitive sports and undertakes regular educational visits to universities, museums and cultural institutions across London.

== Academics ==
NLGS follows the National Curriculum for England and structures its academic provision around the motto Bonitas, Scientia, Disciplina. The school states that it offers a “broad and balanced curriculum” that extends beyond statutory requirements, combining traditional academic subjects with trips, clubs, Olympiads and opportunities for cultural enrichment.

The school operates a three-year GCSE programme, giving pupils additional time for depth of study, personalisation and reduced exam pressure. According to the school, this approach has contributed to recent outcomes, including 54% of GCSE grades being awarded at 7–9 in 2024, which it states places the school within the top 1% nationally on progress measures.

Enrichment within the curriculum includes:

- the Young Scholars Programme, exploring real-world ethical and global issues
- drama performance classes in the junior and senior school
- expanded provision in computer science and STEM-related activities
- opportunities to build cultural capital through visits and workshops.
- over 40 different enrichment clubs across the junior and senior school.

=== Post-16 progression and University Foundation Programme ===
NLGS does not operate a traditional sixth form and does not offer A Levels. Most pupils completing Year 11 transfer to external colleges and sixth forms for post-16 study, while a proportion join the school’s own University Foundation Programme (UFP).

The University Foundation Programme is a one-year full-time course accredited by OCN London for students aged 16–18, designed primarily as an alternative to A Levels for progression to higher education. The school offers three main intakes each year (September, January and April), and states that the programme is open to both local and international students.

The UFP is organised into four subject pathways:

- Business and Finance – covering business studies, marketing, finance, computing, mathematics and academic English, with a stated focus on linking business and economic theory to practical case studies.
- Engineering and Computing – including physics, computing, mathematics and further mathematics, alongside English and IELTS preparation, aimed at progression to engineering and computer science degrees.
- Humanities, Law and Social Sciences – combining subjects such as history, media studies, psychology, computing and English, with an emphasis on critical analysis, research and argumentation for degrees in law, politics, international relations and related fields.
- Art and Design – a foundation-style route including fine art, graphic design, fashion and spatial design, with the stated purpose of helping students build a portfolio for entry to creative and design-based degree programmes.

According to the school, teaching on the UFP uses a mixture of lectures, seminars, tutorials, workshops and educational trips, and assessment methods include written examinations, coursework, essays, presentations, practical exercises and portfolio work, depending on the pathway.

Entry requirements published by the school typically include a minimum UKVI IELTS score of 4.5 (or equivalent B2-level English), a CAT4 (Cognitive Abilities Test) score, a recent school report and an age range of 16–18. The school’s FAQs state that around 98% of pupils overall go on to further education at 16, and that UFP students progress to university at a reported rate of 100%.

Graduates of NLGS and its UFP progress to a range of universities, including Oxford, Cambridge, UCL, King’s College London, University of Manchester and Queen Mary University of London.

== Boarding ==
The school offers boarding for approximately 30 boys from Year 8 to Year 11. Facilities include shared bedrooms, lounges, kitchens, study areas and supervised evening study (“prep”). Boarding is accredited by the Boarding Schools Association.

== International Greenwich Olympiad ==
The International Greenwich Olympiad (IGO) is an annual international STEAM project competition organised and hosted by North London Grammar School in London. It brings together secondary school students from around the world to present scientific, technological and creative projects with an emphasis on innovation and global awareness.

Projects are assessed by academic and industry judges according to creativity, scientific method, data analysis and clarity of presentation.

=== Categories ===
IGO categories include:

- AI
- Engineering
- Environmental science
- Computer science
- Energy
- Health sciences
- Social sciences
- Creative arts
- Short film
- Public speaking
- Performing arts
- Sumo Challenge (robotics)
- STEM lesson presentation
- STEAM storytelling

=== IGO 2026 ===
The 2026 Olympiad hosted:

- 1,100 students
- 53 countries
- 538 projects.

Exhibitions and judging were held at Queen Mary University of London.

=== IGO 2025 ===
The 2025 edition expanded to over 500 students from 53 countries. The opening ceremony was hosted at Oxford Town Hall, featuring a parade of national flags and cultural performances.

Local media described IGO as “a hub of innovation and collaboration”, citing its partnerships with schools, ministries of education and international scientific organisations. The Olympiad aligns its themes with selected Sustainable Development Goals and forms part of NLGS's engagement with the UNESCO Associated Schools Network.

== Co-curricular and extracurricular activities ==
NLGS offers an extensive programme of co-curricular and extracurricular activities designed to develop leadership, creativity and personal confidence.

Activities include:

- sports teams, athletics and fitness clubs
- robotics, programming and STEM clubs
- debating and Model United Nations
- drama, public speaking and performance
- Lego coding and robotics
- art, photography and design
- charity initiatives including the Wings of Hope Achievement Awards.

According to the 2025 ISI report, enrichment activities are “well integrated into the curriculum” and contribute strongly to pupils’ personal development.

== Inspections ==
March 2025 – Independent Schools Inspectorate inspection: All standards met, praising pupils’ personal development and the care of boarders.

== Memberships and affiliations ==
According to its published information, North London Grammar School is a member of or affiliated with:

- Independent Schools Association (ISA)
- Independent Schools Council (through ISA)
- Boarding Schools Association
- UNESCO Associated Schools Network (ASPnet)
- Computing at School (CAS Lead School)
- PSHE Association
- Anti-Bullying Alliance
- International Mathematics Assessment for Schools (IMAS) – UK representative.

== Awards and recognition ==
In 2026 FINALIST for Independent Schools Association Senior school of the year.

In 2025 NLGS received the Independent Schools Association WINNER Award for International Provision, recognising the global impact of the International Greenwich Olympiad. Judges highlighted the school's “ambition, success and achievement” in coordinating an event involving more than 500 students from 53 countries.

2024 FINALIST ISA Awards for outstanding engagement in the community and for innovation in independent education network.
