= Moorland School =

Coordinates: 53.8821°N 2.3912°W

Location
- Ribblesdale Avenue; Clitheroe, Lancashire, BB7 2JA; England

Information
- Type: Independent Junior Day School & Nursery
- Motto: Work Conquers All
- Established: circa 1920
- Head teacher: Miss A McKeown
- Gender: Coeducational
- Age: 3 months to 11 years
- Enrolment: 130~
- Website: http://www.moorlandschool.co.uk

Moorland School was a non selective independent Junior School situated in the Ribble Valley, Clitheroe in North West England. The original building is a listed building, situated in 15 acres (61,000 m^{2}) of countryside.

== History ==
Moorland Senior school closed in 2025, with the Junior and Nursery divisions of the school remaining open. The school closed in December 2025. In August 2026, the school was put up for sale.

== Famous pupils ==
- Adnan Ahmed – footballer
- John Cofie - footballer
- Joe Grayson – footballer
- Jay Haddow – footballer
- Harry Leonard – footballer
- Niall Mason – footballer
- Stefan Mols - footballer
- Adam Wharton – England and Crystal Palace footballer
- Scott Wharton – footballer
