= Independent Schools Association (UK) =

UK association of schools

- Abbreviation: ISA
- Registration no.: 1158943
- Headquarters: Great Chesterford
- Location: United Kingdom
- Members: 796
- Chief Executive: Rudolf Eliott Lockhart
- Honorary President: The Lord Lexden

The Independent Schools Association (ISA) is the registered charity that represents the Heads of 796 of the UK’s independent schools.

Founded in 1878, ISA is one of the oldest of the organisations for the heads of independent schools.

The organisation offers professional support and training for Headteachers and staff of its Members' schools, as well as sports and arts activities for pupils.

Arts activities include an annual national art competition, a drama festival, essay writing competitions and much more. A variety of sports are also celebrated, from cross country running, team sports such as football, netball and rugby, as well as table tennis, hockey and much more.

Sport and Arts events arranged by the ISA are held on both the local and national stage.

Members of ISA represent a diverse range of schools within the independent sector. These include pre-prep and preparatory schools, junior schools, senior schools and sixth form colleges. Boarding schools are also represented across the Association's membership, as well as schools for children with special educational needs, and some schools that specialise in the Arts.

Coat of arms of Independent Schools Association
Notes Granted 19 December 1952 Crest On a wreath of the colours an eagle supporting with the dexter claw a quadrant Proper. Escutcheon Argent two torches in saltire Sable enflamed Proper surmounted by a cross couped Gules thereon a sinister gauntlet also Proper. Motto Pro Liberis
