= List of girls' schools in the United Kingdom =

This is a list of, in the United Kingdom, the Crown Dependencies, and British Overseas Territories, schools that only admit girls, or those that only admit girls at certain levels, years, or grades—or those that follow the Diamond Schools model, which separates students by gender at points.

== England ==
=== Bedfordshire ===
- Bedford Girls' School, Bedford
- Challney High School for Girls, Luton

=== Berkshire ===
- Baylis Court School, Slough
- Downe House School, Cold Ash
- The Marist School, Sunninghill
- Newlands Girls' School, Maidenhead
- Queen Anne's School, Caversham
- Windsor Girls' School, Windsor

Ascot

- Heathfield School
- The Marist Schools
- St George's School
- St Mary's School

Reading

- The Abbey School
- Kendrick School
- Reading Girls' School

=== Bristol ===
- Montpelier High School, Bristol

Westbury-on-Trym

- Badminton School
- Redmaids' High School

=== Buckinghamshire ===
- Aylesbury High School, Aylesbury
- Dr Challoner's High School, Little Chalfont
- Pipers Corner School, Great Kingshill
- St Mary's School, Gerrards Cross

Beaconsfield

- Alfriston School
- Beaconsfield High School

High Wycombe

- Wycombe Abbey
- Wycombe High School

=== Cambridgeshire ===
- St Mary's School, Cambridge

=== Cheshire ===
- Alderley Edge School for Girls, Alderley Edge
- Queen's School, Chester
- Sandbach High School, Sandbach

=== Cornwall ===
- Truro High School, Truro

=== Devon ===
- The Maynard School, Exeter
- Torquay Girls' Grammar School, Torquay

Plymouth

- Devonport High School for Girls
- Notre Dame Catholic School
- Plymouth High School for Girls

=== Dorset ===
- Hanford School, Hanford
- Parkstone Grammar School, Poole
- Sherborne School for Girls, Sherborne
- Talbot Heath School, Talbot Woods

Bournemouth

- Avonbourne Girls' Academy
- Bournemouth School for Girls
- Glenmoor Academy

=== East Riding of Yorkshire ===
- Beverley High School, Beverley
- Newland School for Girls, Newland

=== East Sussex ===
- Brighton Girls, Brighton and Hove (formerly Brighton and Hove High School)
- Mayfield School, Mayfield, East Sussex (formerly St Leonards-Mayfield School)
- Roedean School, Brighton

=== Essex ===
- Brentwood Ursuline Convent High School, Brentwood
- Grays Convent High School, Grays

Chelmsford

- Chelmsford County High School for Girls
- New Hall School Girls' Senior School

Colchester

- Colchester County High School for Girls
- St Mary's School

Southend-on-Sea

- Southend High School for Girls
- Westcliff High School for Girls

=== Gloucestershire ===
- Cheltenham Ladies' College, Cheltenham
- Stroud High School, Stroud

Gloucester

- Denmark Road High School
- Ribston Hall High School

=== Greater London ===
- Ayesha Siddiqa Girls School, Southall
- Bentley Wood High School, Stanmore
- Blackfen School for Girls, Blackfen
- Blackheath High School, Blackheath Village
- Brentford School for Girls, Brentford
- Bromley High School, Bickley
- Bullers Wood School, Chislehurst
- Central Foundation Girls' School, Bow
- Chislehurst School for Girls, Chislehurst
- City of London School for Girls, London
- Clapton Girls' Academy, Lower Clapton
- Coloma Convent Girls' School, Shirley
- Connaught School for Girls, Leytonstone
- Copthall School, Mill Hill
- Croydon High School, Croydon
- Elizabeth Garrett Anderson School, Islington
- Eltham Hill School, Eltham
- Enfield County School, Enfield
- Frances Bardsley Academy for Girls, Romford
- Francis Holland School, Central London
- Glendower Preparatory School, South Kensington
- Grey Coat Hospital, Westminster
- Harris Academy Bermondsey, Bermondsey
- Harris Girls' Academy East Dulwich, East Dulwich
- Henrietta Barnett School, Hampstead Garden
- Highbury Fields School, Highbury
- Hornsey School for Girls, Haringey
- James Allen's Girls' School, Dulwich
- La Retraite Roman Catholic Girls' School, Clapham Park
- Lady Eleanor Holles School, Hampton
- The Laurels School, Upper Norwood
- Madani Girls' School, Whitechapel
- Mulberry School for Girls, Shadwell
- Newstead Wood School, Orpington
- Nonsuch High School for Girls, Cheam
- Norbury High School for Girls, Thornton Heath
- North London Collegiate School, Edgware
- Northwood College, Northwood
- Notre Dame Roman Catholic Girls' School, Elephant and Castle
- Pembridge Hall School, Notting Hill
- Plashet School, East Ham
- Prendergast School, Brockley
- Putney High School, Putney
- Queen Elizabeth's School for Girls, Barnet
- Queen's College, London, Westminster
- Queen's Gate School, Queen's Gate
- Sacred Heart Language College, Wealdstone
- Sacred Heart of Mary Girls' School, Upminster
- Sarah Bonnell School, Stratford
- St Angela's Ursuline School, Forest Gate
- St Claudine's Catholic School for Girls, Harlesden
- St Helen's School, Northwood
- St Marylebone School, Marylebone
- St Michael's Catholic Grammar School, North Finchley
- St Saviour's and St Olave's Church of England School, Southwark
- St Ursula's Convent School, Greenwich
- Streatham and Clapham High School, Streatham
- Sutton High School, Sutton
- Swakeleys School for Girls, Hillingdon
- Sydenham School, Sydenham
- Tayyibah Girls' School, Hackney
- Ursuline Academy Ilford, Ilford
- Wallington High School for Girls, Wallington
- Walthamstow School for Girls, Walthamstow
- Woodford County High School for Girls, Woodford Green
- Woolwich Polytechnic School for Girls, Thamesmead

Beckenham

- Harris Girls' Academy Bromley
- Langley Park School for Girls

Bexleyheath

- St Catherine's Catholic School for Girls
- Townley Grammar School

Camden

- Camden School for Girls
- Parliament Hill School

Carshalton

- Carshalton High School for Girls
- St Philomena's Catholic High School for Girls

Ealing

- The Ellen Wilkinson School for Girls
- Notting Hill and Ealing High School
- St Augustine's Priory School

Fulham

- Fulham Cross Girls' School
- Kensington Preparatory School
- Lady Margaret School, Parsons Green

Hammersmith

- Bute House Preparatory School for Girls, Brook Green
- Godolphin and Latymer School
- Sacred Heart High School
- St James Independent Schools Senior Girls School
- St Paul's Girls' School, Brook Green

Hampstead

- South Hampstead High School
- St Margaret's School

Highgate

- Channing School
- La Sainte Union Catholic School

Isleworth

- The Green School for Girls
- Gumley House Convent School

Kingston Upon Thames

- Holy Cross Preparatory School
- Marymount International School London
- Tiffin Girls' School

New Malden

- Coombe Girls' School
- Holy Cross School

Palmers Green

- Palmers Green High School
- St Anne's Catholic High School

Stamford Hill

- Lubavitch Senior Girls' School
- Our Lady's Catholic High School
- Yesodey Hatorah Senior Girls' School

Surbiton

- Surbiton High School (coeducational ages 4-11, and girls until 18)
- Tolworth Girls' School

Twickenham

- St Catherine's School
- Waldegrave School

Wandsworth

- Burntwood School
- Eaton House The Manor Girls' School

Wimbledon

- Ricards Lodge High School
- The Study
- Ursuline High School
- Wimbledon High School

=== Greater Manchester ===
- Altrincham Grammar School for Girls, Bowdon
- Beis Yaakov High School, Higher Broughton
- Bury Grammar School, Bury (for girls)
- Fairfield High School for Girls, Droylsden
- Flixton Girls' School, Flixton
- Levenshulme High School, Levenshulme
- Loreto Grammar School, Altrincham
- Whalley Range High School, Whalley Range

Bolton

- Bolton School Single Sex Junior, Senior, and Sixth Form schools
- Bolton Muslim Girls' School

Fallowfield

- Manchester High School for Girls
- Withington Girls' School

=== Hampshire ===
- Farnborough Hill, Farnborough
- Portsmouth High School, Southsea
- St Anne's Catholic School, Southampton
- St Nicholas' School, Church Crookham
- St Swithun's School, Winchester

=== Hertfordshire ===
- Abbot's Hill School, Hemel Hempstead
- Berkhamsted School, Berkhamsted Separate Girls' Senior School
- Haberdashers' Girls' School, Elstree (formerly Haberdashers' Aske's School for Girls)
- The Hertfordshire and Essex High School, Bishop's Stortford
- Hitchin Girls' School, Hitchin
- Presdales School, Ware
- The Royal Masonic School for Girls, Rickmansworth (coed Nursery)
- St Francis' College, Letchworth
- St Margaret's School, Bushey
- Watford Grammar School for Girls, Watford

Hatfield

- Bishop's Hatfield Girls' School
- Queenswood School

St Albans

- Loreto College
- St Albans Girls' School (formerly St Alban's Girls' Grammar School)
- St Albans High School for Girls

=== Kent ===
- Benenden School, Benenden
- Chatham Grammar School for Girls, Chatham
- Cobham Hall School, Cobham
- Dover Grammar School for Girls, Dover
- Folkestone School for Girls, Folkestone
- Kent College, Pembury
- Mayfield Grammar School, Gravesend
- Northfleet School for Girls, Northfleet
- Rainham School for Girls, Rainham
- Rochester Grammar School, Rochester
- Simon Langton Girls' Grammar School, Canterbury
- Tonbridge Grammar School, Tonbridge
- Tunbridge Wells Girls' Grammar School, Tunbridge Wells
- Walderslade Girls' School, Walderslade
- Walthamstow Hall, Sevenoaks
- Weald of Kent Grammar School, Tonbridge
- Wilmington Grammar School for Girls, Wilmington

Dartford

- Dartford Grammar School for Girls
- Dartford Science & Technology College

Maidstone

- Invicta Grammar School
- Maidstone Grammar School for Girls

=== Lancashire ===
- Lancaster Girls' Grammar School, Lancaster
- Penwortham Girls' High School, Penwortham
- Preston Muslim Girls High School, Deepdale
- Tauheedul Islam Girls' High School, Beardwood

=== Leicestershire ===
- Loughborough High School, Loughborough

Leicester

- Leicester High School for Girls
- Sir Jonathan North College

=== Lincolnshire ===
- Boston High School, Boston
- Kesteven and Grantham Girls' School, Grantham
- Kesteven and Sleaford High School, Sleaford
- Spalding High School, Spalding

=== Merseyside ===
- Greenbank High School, Hillside
- Merchant Taylors' Girls' School, Great Crosby
- Upton Hall School FCJ, Upton
- Weatherhead High School, Wallasey
- West Kirby Grammar School, West Kirby
- Wirral Grammar School for Girls, Bebington

Birkenhead

- Birkenhead High School Academy
- Prenton High School for Girls

Liverpool

- Archbishop Blanch School
- Bellerive FCJ Catholic College
- The Belvedere Academy
- Broughton Hall High School
- Holly Lodge Girls' College
- St John Bosco Arts College
- St Julie's Catholic High School

=== North Yorkshire ===
- Harrogate Ladies' College, Harrogate (coeducational for ages 2-11 with girls' only until age 18)
- The Mount School, York
- Queen Mary's School, Topcliffe
- Skipton Girls' High School, Skipton

=== Northamptonshire ===
- Northampton High School, Hardingstone
- Northampton School for Girls, Northampton
- Southfield School, Kettering

=== Norfolk ===
- Norwich High School for Girls, Norwich

=== Nottinghamshire ===
Nottingham

- Jamia Al-Hudaa
- Nottingham Girls' Academy
- Nottingham Girls' High School

=== Oxfordshire ===
- Cranford House School, Moulsford
- Didcot Girls' School, Didcot
- Headington Rye Oxford, Headington
- Oxford High School, Oxford
- St Helen and St Katharine, Abingdon
- Tudor Hall School, Banbury

=== Shropshire ===
- Adcote School, Little Ness
- Moreton Hall School, Oswestry
- Newport Girls' High School, Newport
- Shrewsbury High School, Shrewsbury (coed from ages 3-13 and girls only ages 13-18)

=== Somerset ===
Bath

- Hayesfield Girls' School
- Royal High School

=== South Yorkshire ===
- Sheffield High School, Sheffield

=== Surrey ===
- Limpsfield Grange School, Limpsfield
- Manor House School, Little Bookham
- Notre Dame School, Cobham
- Rosebery School, Epsom
- Sir William Perkins's School, Chertsey
- St Catherine's School, Bramley
- St Teresa's School, Effingham
- Woldingham School, Woldingham

Guildford

- Guildford High School
- Prior's Field School
- Tormead School

=== Tyne and Wear ===
- Gateshead Jewish Academy for Girls, Gateshead
- St Anthony's Girls' Catholic Academy, Sunderland
- Westfield School, Gosforth

Newcastle upon Tyne

- Newcastle High School for Girls
- Sacred Heart Catholic High School

=== Warwickshire ===
- The King's High School for Girls, Warwick
- The Kingsley School, Leamington Spa (coed for preparatory school, girls only for senior school and sixth form)
- Rugby High School for Girls, Rugby
- Stratford Girls' Grammar School, Stratford-upon-Avon

=== West Midlands ===
- Queen Mary's High School, Walsall
- Wolverhampton Girls' High School, Wolverhampton

Birmingham

- Bordesley Green Girls' School
- Edgbaston High School
- Hillcrest School
- Hodge Hill Girls' School
- King Edward VI Camp Hill School for Girls
- King Edward VI Handsworth School
- King Edward VI Handsworth Wood Girls' Academy
- King Edward VI High School for Girls
- King Edward VI Lordswood School for Girls
- King Edward VI Northfield School for Girls
- Kings Norton Girls' School
- Selly Park Girls' School
- St Paul's School for Girls
- Sutton Coldfield Grammar School for Girls
- Swanshurst School

=== West Sussex ===
- Burgess Hill Girls, Burgess Hill
- Davison High School, Worthing
- Millais School, Horsham

=== West Yorkshire ===
- Batley Girls' High School, Batley
- Gateways School, Harewood (coed until age 11, girls only ages 11-18)
- Wakefield Girls' High School, Wakefield

Bradford

- Belle Vue Girls' Academy
- Bradford Girls' Grammar School (coed ages 5-11, girls only ages 11-18)
- Feversham Girls' Academy

=== Wiltshire ===
- South Wilts Grammar School, Salisbury
- St Mary's School, Calne, Calne
- St Mary's School, Shaftesbury, Shaftesbury

=== Worcestershire ===
- RGS Dodderhill, Droitwich Spa

=== Former girls' schools in England ===
Closed

- Abbots Bromley School, Abbots Bromley (1874-2019)
- Allenswood Boarding Academy, Wimbledon (1870-1955)
- Amberfield School, Ipswich (1927-2011)
- Bedgebury School, Goudhurst (closed in 2010)
- Bruton School for Girls, Bruton (1901-2022)
- Camborne Grammar School, Camborne (1908-1976)
- Chesterfield St Helena School, Chesterfield (1892-1991)
- Clifton Hall Girls' Grammar School, Clifton (1958-1976)
- Clovelly-Kepplestone, Eastbourne (1908-1934)
- Commonweal Lodge (1916-2010)
- Convent of the Assumption, Sidmouth (1914-1976)
- Cranborne Chase School, Wardour (1946-1990)
- Donnison School, Sunderland (1798-1910)
- Downham School, Hatfield Heath (1932-1967)
- East Haddon Hall School, East Haddon (1932-1971)
- Felixstowe College, Felixstowe (1929-1994)
- Greenacre School for Girls, Banstead (1933-2017)
- Harrow County School for Girls, Harrow (1914-1975)
- Hethersett Old Hall School, Norwich (1924-2019)
- Lady Verney High School, High Wycombe (1956-1993)
- Lavant House School, Lavant (closed 2016)
- Liverpool Institute High School for Girls, Liverpool (1844-1984)
- Loughborough Amherst School, Loughborough (1850-2025)
- Mary Datchelor School, Camberwell (1877-1981)
- Milham Ford School, Oxford (1890-2003)
- Milton Mount College, Gravesend (1871-1960)
- Miss Ironside's School, Kensington
- Mount St Mary's Convent School, Exeter (closed 1997)
- North Foreland Lodge, Sherfield on Loddon (1909-2003)
- Notre Dame High School, Northampton (1880-1975)
- Old Palace School, Croydon (1889-2025)
- Parsons Mead School, Ashtead (1897-2006)
- Peterborough County Grammar School for Girls, Peterborough (1904-1982)
- Queen Margaret's School, York (1901-2025)
- Queenwood Ladies' College, Eastbourne
- Reading Abbey Girls' School (1755-1794)
- Richmond County School for Girls, Richmond
- Rotherham Girls' High School, Rotherham (1906-1973)
- Rowen House School, Belper (1979-1992)
- Southover Manor School, Lewes (1924-1988)
- St Brandon's School, Clevedon (1831-2004)
- St Hilda's School, Exeter (1885-1942)
- St Martin-in-the-Fields High School for Girls, Tulse Hill (1699-2024)
- St Mary's School, Worcester (1934-2014)
- St Stephen's College, Broadstairs (1867-1991)
- Towers Convent School, Upper Beeding (1903-2020)
- Wykeham House School, Fareham had separate boys and girls schools (1913-2015)
- York College for Girls, York (1908-1997)

Merged

- Ark Helenswood Academy, St Leonards-on-Sea merged with Ark William Parker to become Ark Alexandra Academy in 2019.
- Bedford High School and Dame Alice Harpur School merged into Bedford Girls' School, Bedford in 2012.
- Clarendon School for Girls, Malvern merged into the Monkton Combe School in 1992.
- Crest Girls' Academy, Neasden merged with Crest Boys' Academy to become the coed E-ACT Crest Academy in 2014.
- Droylsden School, Mathematics and Computing College for Girls, Droylsden, merged with Littlemoss High School for Boys to form Droylsden Academy in 2009.
- Dudley Girls' High School, Dudley merged with Dudley Boys Grammar School to become The Dudley School in 1975.
- Ensham School, Tooting merged with Furzedown Secondary School to create the Graveney School in 1986.
- Harvington School, Ealing merged into Durston House in 2023.
- Heatherton House School, Amersham merged into the Berkhamsted School in 2011.
- Heathfield School, Pinner merged into Northwood College in 2014.
- Lawnswood High School, Lawnswood merged with the Leeds Modern School to become the coed Lawnswood School in 1972.
- Leeds Girls' High School, Leeds merged with Leeds Grammar School to become the Grammar School at Leeds in 2008.
- Manchester Central High School for Girls, Manchester which merged into Manchester Academy in 1967.
- Moira House School, Eastbourne merged into the Roedean School in 2018.
- Newcastle upon Tyne Church High School merged with Central Newcastle High School to become Newcastle High School for Girls in 2014.
- Page School for Girls, Downend merged with Stockwell Hill Comprehensive School to become the coed Downend School in 1982.
- Perse School for Girls, Cambridge merged with The Perse School to become the coed Stephen Perse Foundation Schools in 2008.
- Redland High School for Girls merged with the Red Maids' School to become Redmaids' High School in 2016.
- The Royal School, Hampstead merged into the North Bridge House School in 2011.
- Royal School for Daughters of Officers of the Army, Bath merged into the Royal High School, Bath in 1998.
- Rye St Antony School, merged with Headington School to become the coed Headington Rye Oxford in 2024.
- St Edmund's Girls' School, Laverstock merged with Wyvern College to become Wyvern St Edmund's in 2022.
- St Mary's School, Wantage merged into the Heathfield School in 2006.
- Stamford High School, Stamford merged into the coed Stamford School in 2023.

Became co-educational

- Brigidine School, Windsor became the co-ed Queensmead School Windsor in 2018 and closed in 2019.
- Cambridgeshire High School for Girls, Cambridge became the coed Long Road Sixth Form College in 1974.
- Carlisle & County High School for Girls, Carlisle became the coed St Aidan's County High School in 1970, which became the Richard Rose Central Academy in 2008.
- Casterton School, Casterton became coed in 2000 and merged into the Sedbergh School in 2013.
- Derby High School, Littleover became coed in 2019.
- Durham High School, Durham became coed in 2025.
- Farlington School, Horsham became coed in 2020.
- Godolphin School, Salisbury became coed in 2025.
- Ipswich High School, Ipswich became coed in 2019.
- Malvern St James, Great Malvern became coed in 2025.
- Maria Fidelis, Camden became coed in 2013.
- Notre Dame Catholic College, Liverpool became coed in 2012.
- Ockbrook School, Derby became coed in 2013 and closed in 2021.
- Oldfield School, Bath became coed in 2012.
- The Peterborough School, Peterborough became coed in 2010.
- Portsmouth Academy, Portsmouth became coed in 2017.
- Princess Helena College, Preston became coed in 2019 and closed in 2021.
- Retford High School for Girls, Retford became the coed The Elizabethan Academy in 2012.
- The Royal School, Haslemere became coed in 2011 and closed in 2025.
- St Dominic's Grammar School, Brewood became coed in 2017
- St Dominic's Priory School, Stone became coed in 2011.
- St Joseph's Convent School, Reading, became the coed St Joseph's College in 2010.
- St Martha's Catholic School for Girls, Monken Hadley became the coed Mount House School in 2017.
- Stonar School, Atworth became coed in the mid-1900s.
- Teesside High School, Stockton-on-Tees had separate girls and boys schools from 2005 to 2015, after which it became coed.
- Walton Girls' High School, Grantham became the coed Walton Academy in 2019.
- Westholme School, Blackburn became coed in 2018.
- Winchester County High School for Girls, Winchester became the coed Westgate School in 1973.
- Wychwood School, Oxford became coed in 2023.

== Northern Ireland ==
- Assumption Grammar School, Ballynahinch
- Glenlola Collegiate School, Bangor
- Loreto Grammar School, Omagh
- Mount Lourdes Grammar School, Enniskillen

Belfast

- Belfast Model School for Girls
- Dominican College
- Hunterhouse College
- St Dominic's Grammar School for Girls
- St Genevieve's High School
- Strathearn School
- Victoria College

Derry

- St Cecilia's College
- St Mary's College
- Thornhill College

Newry

- Our Lady's Grammar School
- Sacred Heart Grammar School
- St Mary's High School

Former

- Coleraine High School, Coleraine (1875-2015)
- St Brigid's Girls' High School, Portadown merged with St Malachy's Boys' High School to become Drumcree College in 1985, which closed in 2017.
- St Louis Grammar School, Ballymena became coed in 1970.
- St Louise's Comprehensive College, Belfast became coed in 2019.
- St Rose's Dominican College, Belfast (1961-2019)

== Scotland ==
- The Mary Erskine School, Edinburgh
- St George's School, Edinburgh
- St Margaret's School for Girls, Aberdeen

Former

- Albyn School became coed in 2005.
- Butterstone House School, Meigle merged into the Kilgraston School in 2003, which closed in 2024.
- Craigholme School, Pollokshields (1894-2020)
- Glasgow Industrial School for Girls, Glasgow
- Hutchesons' Grammar School became coed in 1976.
- Notre Dame High School, Glasgow became coed in 2019.
- Oxenfoord Castle School, Pathhead (1931-1993)
- Park School for Girls, Glasgow (1880-1996)
- St Margaret's School, Edinburgh (1890-2010)
- St Leonards School, St Andrews became coed in 1999.
- St Trinnean's School, Edinburgh (1922-1946)

== Wales ==
- Howell's School, Llandaff
- Lewis Girls Comprehensive School, Ystrad Mynach

Former schools

- Aberdare Girls' School, Aberdare (1913-2014)
- Cowbridge Girls School, Cowbridge merged into Cowbridge Comprehensive School in 1974.
- Haberdashers' Monmouth School for Girls, Monmouth merged with the Monmouth School for Boys to form the Haberdashers' Monmouth School in 2024.
- Howell's School, Denbigh (1859-2013)
- Lowther College, Flint became coed in 1977 and closed in 1982.
- St Winifred's School, Llanfairfechan (1887-1968)

== Crown Dependencies ==
Guernsey

- The Ladies' College, Saint Peter Port

Jersey

- Beaulieu Convent School, St Helier (co-educational sixth form)
- Jersey College for Girls, Saint Saviour

== British Overseas Territories ==
Bermuda

- Bermuda High School, Pembroke

Gibraltar

Former

- Westside School, Queensway became coed in 2021.

== See also ==
- Girls' Schools Association
- Girls' Day School Trust
- List of boys' schools in the United Kingdom
- List of girls' schools in Hong Kong (Hong Kong was formerly a territory of the UK)
