= Agbiz =

Agbiz may refer to:

- Ağbiz, Azerbaijan
- Agribusiness

== See also ==
- Agbis (disambiguation)
