= West Knighton, Leicester =

Suburb of Leicester, England

Coordinates: 52.607°N 1.126°W

West Knighton is a suburb of Leicester in the United Kingdom.

West Knighton's boundaries include Knighton Fields Road East to the North, Welford Road to the East, the London-bound railway line to the West and the Leicester City boundary to the South (a line just South of Asquith Way/Blvd) in Leicestershire.

West Knighton was mostly constructed during the 1950s and contains a variety of semi-detached and detached housing, council allotments. It also contains Lancaster Academy and Sir Jonathan North Community College. It is part of Knighton ward and of Leicester South constituency.
