= Assumption Convent =

Assumption Convent may refer to:

- Assumption Convent, former name of Assumption College San Lorenzo, a school in San Lorenzo Village, Makati, Philippines
- Assumption Convent, other name of Assumption Iloilo, a school in Iloilo City, the Philippines
- Assumption Convent School (Thailand), a school in Bangkok, Thailand
- Assumption Convent School, Germiston, a private school in Gauteng, South Africa.
- Convent of the Assumption, a school in Sidmouth, Devon, England
- Our Lady of the Assumption Convent, Warwick, a former Roman Catholic convent in Warwick, Australia
