= Agbis =

Agbis may refer to:

- Ağbiş, village in Azerbaijan
- Association of Governing Bodies of Independent Schools (AGBIS), British organisation
- Agribusiness
