= Independent Association of Prep Schools =

- Formation: 1892
- Chief Executive: Dominic Norrish
- Website: https://iaps.uk

The Independent Association of Prep Schools (IAPS, formerly Independent Association of Preparatory Schools) is a schools association, representing more than 660 preparatory schools.

The majority of IAPS' schools are in the UK, with other locations including Africa, the Middle East, Singapore, and Hong Kong.

IAPS is part of the Independent Schools Council.

== History ==
IAPS was founded in 1892, as the Incorporated Association of Preparatory Schools.

In 1981 IAPS merged with the Association of Headmistresses of Preparatory Schools, and ten years later moved its headquarters from Kensington to offices in Leamington Spa, before relocating again in 2021 to its current headquarters at Bishop's House, Artemis Drive, Tachbrook Park, Warwick CV34 6UD.

In 2007 the Incorporated Association of Preparatory Schools changed its legal title to IAPS, and became known as the Independent Association of Preparatory Schools. In 2010, this was shortened to the current form.

== Organisation ==
IAPS elects a Chair every three years. The current Chair, serving until September 2027, is Tania Botting, formerly Head of Greenfield School in Surrey.

Dominic Norrish has been chief executive of IAPS since July 2023 and Emilie Darwin is currently Deputy CEO.

Much of the work of IAPS is directed by various committees, made up of current headteachers of member schools.

IAPS's Board meets once a term and the association holds an Annual Conference every September.

== Role ==
IAPS provides its members with a national voice on matters of independent prep school education, and seeks to have a positive influence on public opinion of prep schools,

Members are provided with advice, information and support on educational and school management issues, and receive regular internal and external mailings via the organisation.

IAPS arranges a number of developmental courses for its members, as well as sports events for its schools. The association also hosts a jobs website advertising vacancies in its member schools.

== See also ==
- Independent Schools Council
- Headmasters' and Headmistresses' Conference
- Society of Heads
- Girls' Schools Association
- Independent Schools Association
- Association of Governing Bodies of Independent Schools
