= Faversham (disambiguation) =

Faversham is a town in Kent, England, in the district of Swale, roughly halfway between Sittingbourne and Canterbury.

Faversham may also refer to:

- Faversham (UK Parliament constituency), a parliamentary constituency in Kent
- Faversham railway station, a railway station on the Chatham Main Line
- HMS Faversham (1918), a Hunt-class minesweeper
- William Faversham (1868-1940), English film actor

== See also ==
- Faversham Abbey
- Faversham Parish Church
- Feversham (disambiguation)
- Faversham explosives industry
- The Penny Dreadfuls Present...The Brothers Faversham
