= Association of Governing Bodies of Independent Schools =

UK independent schools trade association

The Association of Governing Bodies of Independent Schools (AGBIS) is the supporting and advisory organisation for governing bodies of independent schools in the UK, and is a member of the Independent Schools Council.

== History ==
The Association of Governing Bodies of Public Schools, at that time boys' schools was founded in 1940. The Governing Bodies of Girls' Schools Association was formed in 1942 to represent independent girls' schools. The former association became the Governing Bodies Association in 1944 and represented both independent boys' and co-educational schools. The two associations merged in June 2002.

== Structure ==
AGBIS is a registered charity (No 1108756) and company (No 0521716) limited by guarantee. The head office is based in Welwyn, England. The general secretary is Richard Harman. Governing bodies are admitted to membership if their heads are members of one of the following organisations:

- The Headmasters' and Headmistresses' Conference
- The Girls' Schools Association
- The Independent Association of Preparatory Schools
- The Independent Schools Association (UK)
- The Society of Headmasters & Headmistresses of Independent Schools

Schools may also apply for associate membership if they are in membership of:

- Scottish Council of Independent Schools
- Welsh Independent Schools Council
