= Sisters of St. Louis =

Catholic religious order of nuns

- Formation: 1842; 184 years ago
- Founder: Thérèse de la Croix; Louis Marie Eugène Bautain
- Founded at: Juilly, Seine-et-Marne, France
- Purpose: Education
- Members: ~380
- Affiliations: Catholic Church
- Website: www.stlouissisters.org

The Sisters of St Louis (SSL) is a French Catholic religious order of nuns founded by Louis Eugene Marie Bautain and Thérèse de la Croix in 1842.

== History ==
The order traces its origins back to Strasbourg, France, in 1797, when three religious people signed a spiritual act of union and vowed to remain united together in the heart of Christ until death; Fr Louis Eugene Marie Bautain was influenced by this union and he and Mère Thérèse de la Croix officially founded the SSL in Juilly, France in 1842.

The order was originally established to promote Christian education for young people and has set up a number of schools around the world. It originally included men as well as women but subsequently became a women-only order.

In 2024, it is a relatively small order with a total of 380 members around the world; members follow the motto of “Sint Unum - May they be one”.

== Locations ==
=== Brazil ===
The first SSL in Brazil was established in 1978.

=== Belgium ===
The first SSL in Belgium was established in 1903.

=== Benin ===
The first SSL in Benin was established in 2001.

=== Canada ===
The order has 13 branches in Canada (mainly Quebec).

=== Ethiopia ===
The first SSL in Ethiopia was established in 2013.

=== France ===
The order has 5 branches in France.

=== Ghana ===
The first SSL in Ghana was established in 1947.

=== Haiti ===
The order has 26 branches in Haiti.

=== Ireland ===
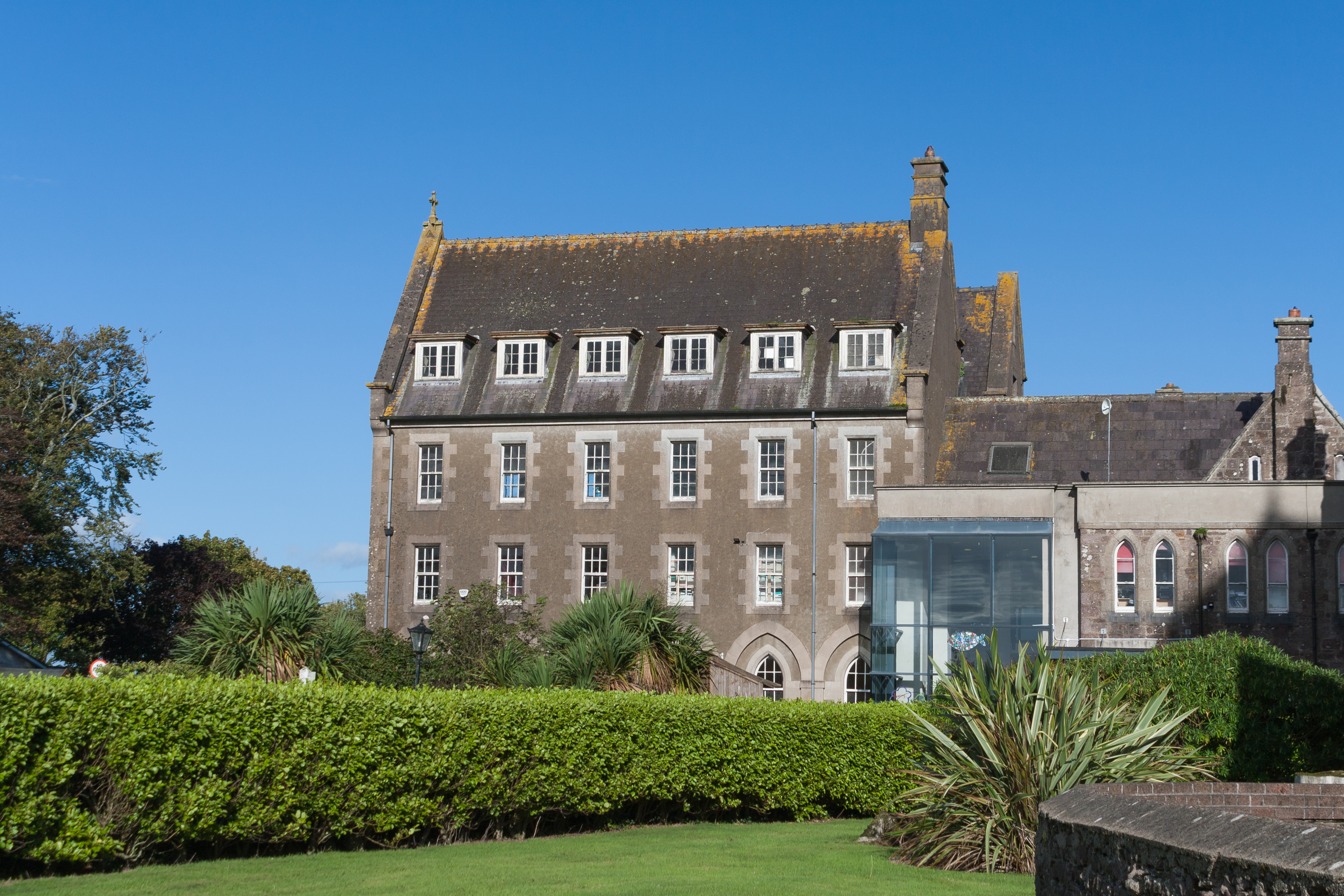
Former St. Louis Convent in Ramsgrange, County Wexford, built in 1912.

The mother house of the order in Ireland was founded in Monaghan in 1859. The second house followed in Bundoran in 1870. By papal decree, the Irish province became autonomous in 1921. It returned to the mother-congregation (in Juilly) in 1952.

The order was involved in the establishment of several schools. These included

- St. Louis Secondary School, Monaghan
- St Louis Secondary School, Carrickmacross, Co. Monaghan
- St. Louis Secondary School, Dundalk
- St Louis Secondary School, Kiltimagh, Co Mayo
- St Louis High School, Rathmines
- St Louis Grammar School, Ballymena
- St Louis Grammar School, Kilkeel
- St Louis Secondary School, Ramsgrange, Co. Wexford
- St Genevieve's High School, Belfast, Northern Ireland
- St Joseph's Training School, MiddleTown, Northern Ireland

However, the order has since withdrawn from involvement in these schools.

=== Madagascar ===
The order has 9 branches in Madagascar.

=== Mali ===
The order has 3 branches in Mali.

=== Martinique ===
The order has a centre in Martinique.

=== Mexico ===
The order has a house in Mexico.

=== Nigeria ===
The first SSL in Nigeria was established in 1948. In 2024, the leadership team is led by Sister Christiana Kure.

=== Senegal ===
The order has a house and a school in Senegal.

=== UK ===
The first SSL in England was established in 1912; it was merged with the Irish SSL in 1952.

The order was involved in the establishment of The Convent of St. Louis school, Bury St Edmunds in 1929.

In 2024, the order has an Apostolic Community in Surrey.

=== USA ===
The first SSL in the US was established in California in 1949. They also have a centre in New York.

== Child sexual and physical abuse in Ireland ==
The Northern Ireland Historical Institutional Abuse Inquiry of 2014 investigated historical physical and sexual abuse of children at St Joseph's Training School in Middletown, County Armagh, which is run by the Sisters of St Louis. There were many instances of physical abuse, and some of sexual abuse, but the inquiry did not find evidence of systemic sexual abuse.

=== Apology ===
On 11 March 2022 ministers from the five main political parties in Northern Ireland and six abusing institutions made statements of apology in the Northern Ireland Assembly.

The six institutions that apologised for carrying out abuse were De La Salle Brothers, represented by Br Francis Manning; the Sisters of Nazareth, represented by Sr Cornelia Walsh; the Sisters of St Louis represented by Sr Uainin Clarke; the Good Shepherd Sisters, represented by Sr Cait O'Leary; Barnardo's in Northern Ireland, represented by Michele Janes; and Irish Church Missions, represented by Rev Mark Jones. In live reporting after the apology, BBC News reported that Jon McCourt from Survivors North West said "If what happened today was the best that the church could offer by way of an apology they failed miserably. There was no emotion, there was no ownership. ... I don't believe that the church and institutions atoned today." He called on the intuitions to "do the right thing" and contribute to the redress fund for survivors, saying that institutions have done similar for people in Scotland. McCourt praised the government ministers' apologies; they had "sat and thought out and listened to what it was we said.", but said that the institutions had failed to do this, leading to some victims having to leave the room while they were speaking, "compound[ing] the hurt." Others angry at the institutions' apologies included Caroline Farry, who attended St Joseph's Training School in Middletown from 1978 to 1981, overseen by nuns from the Sisters of St Louis, Pádraigín Drinan from Survivors of Abuse, and Alice Harper, whose brother, a victim of the De La Salle Brothers, had since died. Peter Murdock, from campaign group Savia, was at Nazareth Lodge Orphanage with his brother (who had recently died); he likened the institution to an "SS camp". He said "It's shocking to hear a nun from the institution apologising ... it comes 30 years too late ... people need to realise that it has to come from the heart. They say it came from the heart but why did they not apologise 30 years ago?"

The order issued a statement in January 2017 where they accepted the report, issued an apology and gave a promise to address the recommendations.

A board was set to represent all six institutions with a view to paying compensation to abuse victims; however, by April 2024, SSL had not taken any action towards making payments.
