= Feversham =

Feversham may refer to:

- Baron Feversham, a title that has been created twice
- Earl of Feversham
- HMS Feversham, a 32-gun fifth rate warship
- Feversham Girls' Academy, an Islamic school for girls in Bradford, England
- Feversham, a community in Grey Highlands, Ontario, Canada

== See also ==
- Faversham
