= St Mary's School, Worcester =

St Mary's Convent School, Worcester

Location
- Mount Battenhall; Worcester, Worcestershire, WR5 2HP; England
- Coordinates: 52.1814°N 2.2051°W

Information
- Type: Private day school
- Motto: Sine Macula (without fault, without stain)
- Religious affiliation: Roman Catholic
- Established: 1934
- Closed: 2014
- Department for Education URN: 117006 Tables
- Headmistress: C Jawaheer
- Gender: Girls; Boys (ages 0-5)
- Age: 0 to 18
- Website: http://www.stmarys.org.uk

St Mary's School, Worcester (also known as Worcester's Girls' School and colloquially as The Convent) was a private day school for girls aged 0–18 (and boys aged 0–5) in Worcester, England. The school was located at a Victorian mansion centered on a 15-acre campus. Following a surprise announcement that the school had become impossible to run partly due to recession, the school ceased operations at the end of the summer term 2014.

== History ==
=== Building ===
The building which the school occupied, Battenhall Mount, dates back to the Victorian period and was built during the 1860s. It was taken over by Sir Percy Allsopp who extended the building, modeling it after the Italianate style popularised by Prince Albert. His family business went bankrupt and the house was sold off. It was one of many stately mansions used as a convalescent home-cum-hospital during World War I.

=== School ===
In between the wars, the house was put on sale. The Sisters of St Marie Madeleine Postel from St Joseph's Convent School in Reading bought the property in 1934 and turned it into a school. Among its early pupils was Margaret Elgar, great-grandniece of composer Sir Edward Elgar.

The school comprised three divisions: Early Years (3 months – 4 years), the Preparatory School (4 – 11 years) and the Senior School (11 – 18 Years).

== Notable former pupils ==
- Charlotte Jones, playwright and actress
- Helen Lewis, deputy editor of the New Statesman
- Rachel Campbell-Johnston, art editor of The Times
