= Society of Heads =

Group of school leaders in the UK

The Society of Heads, formerly the Society of Headmasters & Headmistresses of Independent Schools (SHHIS), or "S of H", is an association of circa 130 Headmasters and Headmistresses of various types of private schools in the United Kingdom, and was formed in 1961. Members include heads of single-sex and co-educational day and boarding secondary schools, specialist music, dance, and performing arts schools, and special schools for children with learning difficulties. The association's headquarters are in Market Harborough, in Leicestershire, England.

Members of the Society usually have membership of the Association of School and College Leaders, with their schools usually having membership of the Association of Governing Bodies of Independent Schools. Some member girls' schools are also members of the Girls' Schools Association. The Society itself is a constituent of the Independent Schools Council.

== Members ==
- Abbey Gate College
- Ackworth School
- Abbotsholme School
- Austin Friars
- Battle Abbey School
- Bedstone College
- Berkhamsted School
- Bethany School
- Birkdale School
- Bishop Challoner School
- Bournemouth Collegiate School
- Box Hill School
- Bredon School
- Bristol Grammar School
- Burlington House School
- City of London Freemen's School
- Claremont Fan Court School
- Clayesmore School
- Clifton High School
- Cokethorpe School
- Concord College
- Denstone College
- Derby Grammar School
- Derby High School
- Dover College
- Dunottar School
- Elmhurst Ballet School
- Embley School
- Farlington School
- Farringtons School
- Fulneck School
- Gateways School
- Halliford School
- Heathfield Knoll School
- Highclare School
- Hill House School
- Ipswich High School
- Kent College
- Kensington Park School
- Kingham Hill School
- King's Ely
- King's School, Worcester
- Kingsley School
- Kingswood House School
- Kirkham Grammar School
- Leweston School
- Lichfield Cathedral School
- Lincoln Minster School
- Llandovery College
- Loughborough Amherst School
- Luckley House School
- LVS Ascot
- Lycée International de Londres Winston Churchill
- Longridge Towers School
- Maida Vale School
- Milton Abbey School
- Moon Hall School
- More House School
- Moreton Hall School
- Mount Kelly School
- Myddelton College
- Newcastle School for Boys
- Our Lady of Sion School
- Oswestry School
- Our Lady's Abingdon
- Oxford International College
- Pitsford School
- Queen's College, Taunton
- Read School, Drax
- Reading Blue Coat School
- Reddam House
- Reed's School
- Rendcomb College
- Rishworth School
- Royal Ballet School
- Ruthin School
- Rydal Penrhos
- St Augustine's Priory
- Saint Christina's School
- St Christopher School, Letchworth
- St Columba's College, St Albans
- St David's College
- St Edward's School
- Saint Felix School
- St Gabriel's School
- St George's School
- St James Independent Schools
- St John's College, Cardiff
- St John's College, Portsmouth
- St Joseph's College
- St Joseph's College, Ipswich
- St Paul's Cathedral School
- Scarborough College
- Seaford College
- Sedbergh School
- Shebbear College
- Sherfield School
- Shiplake College
- Sibford School
- Silcoates School
- Stafford Grammar School
- Stonar School
- Stover School
- Surbiton High School
- Teesside High School
- Tettenhall College
- The Cathedral School, Llandaff
- The Cedars School
- The Dixie Grammar School
- The Hammond
- The National Mathematics and Science College
- The Peterborough School
- The Purcell School
- The Royal School, Wolverhampton
- The Yehudi Menuhin School
- Thetford Grammar School
- Tranby School
- Tring Park School for the Performing Arts
- Trinity School, Teignmouth
- Windermere School

== See also ==
- John Dunston, former Chair of SHMIS
- List of Member Schools
