= Louis Eugène Marie Bautain =

French philosopher and theologian (1796–1867)

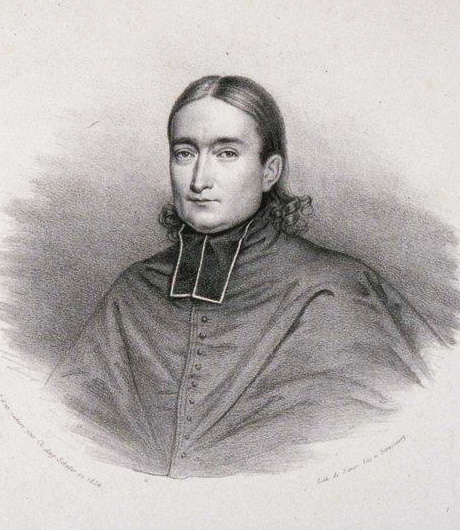
Louis Eugène Marie Bautain

Louis Eugène Marie Bautain (17 February 1796 – 15 October 1867), was a French philosopher and theologian.

== Life ==
Bautain was born in Paris. At the École Normale he came under the influence of Victor Cousin. In 1816, he adopted the profession of higher teaching, and was soon after called to the chair of philosophy in the University of Strasbourg. He held this position for many years, and gave a parallel course of lectures as professor of the literary faculty in the same city. The reaction against speculative philosophy, which carried away De Maistre and Lamennais, influenced him also.

In 1828, he took orders, and resigned his chair at the university. For several years he remained at Strasbourg, lecturing at the Faculty and at the college of Juilly, but in 1849 he set out for Paris as vicar of the diocese. At Paris he obtained considerable reputation as an orator, and in 1853 was made professor of moral theology at the theological faculty at the Sorbonne. This post he held till his death.

Like the Scholastics, he distinguished reason and faith, and held that revelation supplies facts, otherwise unattainable, which philosophy is able to group by scientific methods. Theology and philosophy thus form one comprehensive science. Yet Bautain was no rationalist; like Pascal and Newman he exalted faith above reason. He pointed out, following chiefly the Kantian criticism, that reason can never yield knowledge of things in themselves. But there exists in addition to reason another faculty which may be called intelligence, through which we are put in connection with spiritual and invisible truth. This intelligence does not of itself yield a body of truth; it merely contains the germs of the higher ideas, and these are made productive by being brought into contact with revealed facts. This fundamental conception Bautain worked out in the departments of psychology and morals.

In 1842, Bautain and Mère Thérèse de la Croix officially founded the Sisters of St. Louis in Juilly; the order was originally established to promote Christian education for young people and has set up a number of schools around the world.

Bautain died in Viroflay near Paris, and was buried in Juilly.

== Works ==
The most important of his works are:

- Philosophie du Christianisme (1835)
- Psychologie expérimentale (1839), new edition entitled Esprit humain et ses facultés (1859)
- Philosophie morale (1840)
- Religion et liberté (1848)
- La morale de l’Évangile, comparée aux divers systèmes de morale (Strassburg, 1827; Paris, 1855)
- De l'éducation publique en France au XIX siècle (Paris, 1876).
