= St Louis Secondary School, Dundalk =

St. Louis Secondary School, Dundalk
- Dún Lughaidh, Dún Dealgan

Location
- Castletown Road; Dundalk; Ireland

Information
- Type: Secondary School
- Motto: "Dieu Le Veult", "Ut Sint Unum"
- Religious affiliation: Catholic
- Established: 1950
- Principal: Michelle Dolan
- Staff: 60
- Gender: Female
- Age: 11 to 19
- Enrollment: 700
- Houses: 5
- Colours: Green, White & Black
- Website: stlouisdundalk.ie

St. Louis Secondary School is an all-girls Catholic secondary school in Dundalk, County Louth. It is situated beside the De La Salle College on the outskirts of Dundalk.

== History ==
The Dún Lughaidh girls' school was founded in 1950 by the Sisters of St. Louis, a religious community of nuns which was founded in post-revolutionary France in 1842. The school crest symbolises loyalty to the French crown.

The school and others originally established by the Sisters of St. Louis are now under the trusteeship of the Le Chéile Trust. Le Chéile formally came into being on 1 September 2009 and offers a network of support for all St. Louis schools and staff.

== Motto ==
There are two school mottoes. The primary motto 'Dieu le Veult' which is old French for 'God Wills It' - the rallying cry of the Crusaders. The second motto is 'Ut sint unum' - for 'that they may be one'.
