= St Joseph's College, Reading =

St Joseph's College

Location
- Upper Redlands Road; Reading, Berkshire, RG1 5JT; England

Information
- Former name: St Joseph’s Convent School
- Motto: Latin: Optima Deo (My best for God)
- Religious affiliation: Roman Catholic
- Patron saint: Saint Joseph
- Founded: 1894
- Founder: Sisters of St Marie Madeleine Postel
- Closed: 2026
- Local authority: Reading
- Gender: Co-educational
- Age: 3 to 18
- Houses: Dixon, Hummel, Jennings, Richardson
- Colours: Red, Gold, Black
- Alumni name: Old Broad Oakians

St Joseph's College (formerly St Joseph's Convent School) was a coeducational independent day school in Reading, Berkshire, England. In September 2010, it changed its name to St Joseph's College to reflect the move into co-education from being a girls' school. The junior section was known as St Joseph's College Preparatory School. It was a member of the Girls' Schools Association until the move into coeducation. The College was then a member of the Society of Heads, Independent Schools Council and Catholic Independent Schools’ Council. It won the TES Independent School of the Year award in November 2015.

Broad Oak House, the oldest part of the College, is a Grade II listed building, built between the 1870-1890s. It was once owned by the Sutton family of Sutton Seeds, before it was purchased by the Sisters.

In May 2026, a consultation began with staff due to falling pupil numbers, and increasing costs. The school required "a big cash injection" to survive. The consulation failed, and St Joseph's College closed on 10 July 2026.

== History ==
St Joseph's Convent School was founded in 1894 by the Sisters of St Marie Madeleine Postel, whose aim was to provide a good education in a warm and loving atmosphere. Julie Frances Catherine Postel was born in Barfleur, France in 1756, and was a pioneer in education, basing her teaching on the De La Salle method. She took the name Marie Madeleine after being made a superior, died in 1846 and was canonised in 1925.

St Joseph’s Convent School was founded in Bracknell 1894, later relocated to Castle Hill as the population reached 40 pupils. Reaching the boarding capacity by 1908, the Sisters sought the location of the Broad Oak House on the Upper Redlands Road. Finally, after some initial extensions by Mother Mary of Calvary, the Convent was reopened on the current site in March 1910. However, very soon after the opening, the first school building by Broad Oak was too small. The day-pupils were moved to a place in Eastern Avenue, although some facilities were still shared.

It wasn't until 1928, when Mother Mary of Calvary was of old age, began further extensions. This extension consisted of a large laboratory, domestic science rooms, dormitories and an assembly hall – the current College Theatre. By 1931, the whole school, day-students and boarders were under one roof.

The post-WWII society changed drastically, with the emphasis of education now being less on social accomplishments, and more on science and emerging technologies. As an outward sign of the resolve of the Convent to meet these new challenges, Sister Mary Genevieve – Headmistress at the time – adopted the motto: "Optima Deo – My Best for God".

"OPTIMA DEO. To God, the best— the best of all things to Him Who gave them and to Whom they belong. "The earth is the Lord's, and the fulness there-of: the world, and all they that dwell therein.

"How good to me His child is God my Heavenly Father! He has blessed me with all that I hold dear: with my parents, my family, my home, my friends, my school, and with my place in this beautiful world of His where I am to dwell until at length He calls me to a still more beautiful and wonderful world, my heavenly home, which will be His final gift to me. In return for all His goodness, what can l offer to Him? I must offer only and always the best of everything: OPTIMA DEO."

In 1947 St Georges Hall on Christchurch Road (now belonging to the University of Reading) was purchased by the Convent as the Preparatory School to accommodate younger siblings of pupils.

Throughout the years, extensions were built by the side of the Broad Oak house, including a much-needed Chapel, Hall, Gymnasium and classrooms. In 1956, as numbers of pupils continued to increase, a new wing was constructed behind the Senior School, which consisted of cloakrooms, showers and laboratories. With the newly formed Parents' Association, founded in 1957, a new gymnasium was complete. A new swimming pool, at the time known as the C.F. Taylor Swimming Pool, was opened by The Most Reverend Derek Worlock, the Bishop of Portsmouth. The rapidity with which it was completed being largely due to the generosity of one parent, Mr. C. Taylor, whom the swimming was named after.

By early 1967, a new large dining hall was ready, and in 16 March of the same year, a modern new Chapel – extended and connected by an assembly hall, now known as the College Hall – was consecrated and opened. The altar was also generously sponsored by Mr. C. Taylor. As the new Chapel-cum-Hall was opened, the old hall was eventually converted as the current College Theatre; and the old Chapel as the current library.

The Sisters continued to run the school until 1979 when the Rev. Mother Provincial decided that because of the changing role of the Sisters, the school should close. However, after intervention by the Parents’ Association and with the co-operation of the Superior General, the school was able to continue as an educational trust whose members form the governing body. The first lay headmistress, Mrs Joan Effendowicz, was appointed in 1979.

Later in 1988 a brand new specially designed Prep School was built in the orchard of the Convent, to replace the site on Christchurch Road, now named St Joseph’s Preparatory School.

In September 2009, the board of governors voted for the school to become a fully co-educational school. St Joseph's Convent School became St Joseph's College in September 2010 to reflect this change.

In 2019, to celebrate and to commemorate the 125th anniversary of the College and her legacy, four new houses were created: Dixon, Hummel, Jennings and Richardson.

== Curriculum ==
From age 3, the curriculum followed the Early Years Foundation Stage, with specialist teaching in Music and PE. Curriculum throughout the Prep School was broad, with specialist teachers increasing as pupils moved towards Year 6.

During Years 7 to 9, pupils studied Mathematics, English, Modern and Classical Languages, Science, History, Geography, Religious Studies (RE), Food and Information Technology, Music, Drama, Physical Education (PE) and Personal, Social, Health, Environmental and Economic Education (PSHEE). In Years 10 and 11 students are prepared for public GCSE examinations. They all study the core subjects of Mathematics, English, Science and Religious Studies (the latter is taken in Year 10), with up to four further subjects chosen. In the Sixth Form students may study up to four A Levels. The school hosts many music concerts and school plays. It is considered as a leader in Music and Dramatic Arts locally.

== Notable former pupils ==
- Alma Cogan, singer
- Marianne Faithfull, singer
- Sally Oldfield, musician
