= The Marist School, Sunninghill =

Catholic day school in Sunninghill, Berkshire, England

The Marist School

Location
- Kings Road; Ascot, Berkshire, SL5 7PS; England; 51°24′11″N 0°39′00″W

Information
- Type: Private day school
- Motto: Sub Mariae Nomine (In Mary's name)
- Religious affiliation: Roman Catholic
- Established: 1870; 1947 (present school)
- Founders: Marist Sisters
- Department for Education URN: 110152 Tables
- Chair of Governors: Ann Nash
- Principal: Joanne Smith
- Gender: Female
- Age: 2 to 18
- Enrolment: 440
- Colours: Blue, Gold
- Former pupils: Maristines
- Website: themarist.com

The Marist School is an private Catholic day school for girls aged 2–18 with a sixth form and co-educational nursery in Sunninghill near Ascot, Berkshire, England.

== History ==
The school location and buildings, as they are today, are a result of the London bombings during World War II. The Marist Sisters had opened a convent and boarding school at Elm Villa, Upper Holloway, about 1862. Eight years later in 1870, they moved to Grove Lodge, Grove Road, Richmond, London, then in the county of Surrey. During the air raids of 1940, although there were no casualties, the convent, by then in Queens Road, Richmond, was damaged. As a result, they took over additional premises at Fife Road, East Sheen. In 1947, they bought Frognal House and grounds in Sunninghill and moved both sites to Sunninghill. The school celebrated fifty years on the Sunninghill site in 1997.

A new building for the prep department was started in 1968 and opened in 1970.

Boarding was eventually discontinued.

In 1990, the school offered enrolment through the Assisted Places Scheme; this was an arrangement in which the local authority contributed to fees.

The school was sold to Concept Education in 2022, and the Marist Sisters ceased to be involved with the school.

== Campus ==
The school is within 55-acre (220,000 m^{2}) of woodland in the village of Sunninghill, Berkshire. The site includes the senior and sixth form sections, the nursery and preparatory sections, a science block, drama studio, an indoor swimming pool, a music block, a recording studio, playing fields, a pond, netball courts, an AstroTurf pitch and a sports hall, officially opened in March 2017 by the Duke of York.

== Preparatory School ==
Marist Preparatory School

Location
- The Rosary; Ascot, Berkshire, SL5 7PS; England

Information
- Type: Prep day school
- Religious affiliation: Roman Catholic
- Department for Education URN: 110157 Tables
- Head teacher: Will May
- Gender: Mixed
- Age: 2 to 11
- Enrolment: 200~
- Affiliations: IAPS

Girls and boys can enter the early years department from age two, and girls can move on to the preparatory school from age 4 to 11 years. The preparatory school compound is known as "The Rosary".

== Academic performance and inspections ==
As of 2026, the school's most recent inspection by the Independent Schools Inspectorate was in 2024, when the school was judged to meet the independent school standards.

== Extracurricular activities ==
Sixth form pupils have the opportunity to go on pilgrimage to Lourdes, as support to pilgrims who are disabled.

In 1987, the school had a pony club.

The tennis player Sue Barker attended a sister school in Paignton. When competing as a schoolgirl at the Wimbledon Championships, her team stayed at the Marist School in Sunninghill. She has described the nuns from the Sunninghill school coming to watch the tournaments.
