= Helen Lewis (journalist) =

British journalist (born 1983)

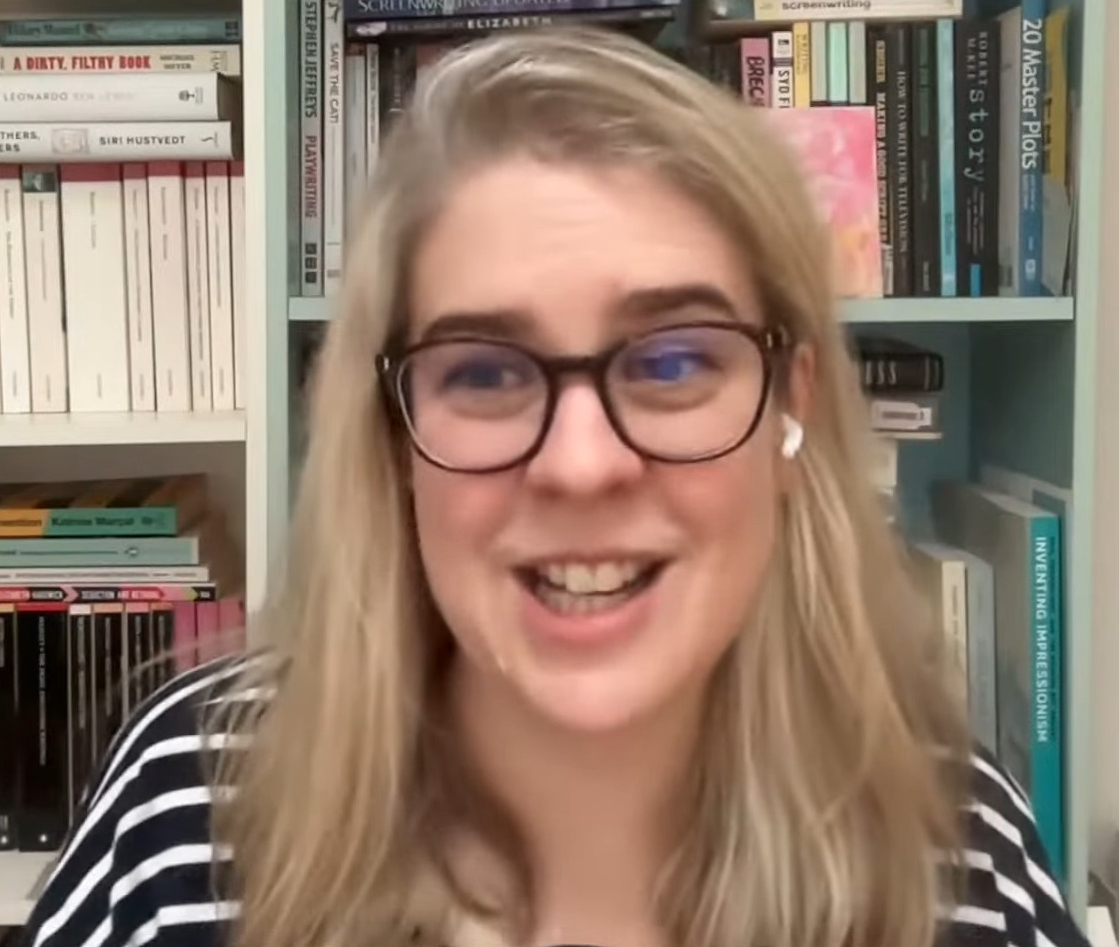
- Lewis in 2024
- Born: Helen Alexandra Lewis; 30 September 1983 (age 43); Worcester, England
- Other name: Helen Lewis-Hasteley
- Education: St Peter's College, Oxford (BA); London City University (PGDip); Open University (MA)
- Occupations: Journalist, editor
- Spouse: Jonathan Haynes (m. 2015)

Helen Alexandra Lewis (born 30 September 1983) is an English journalist and staff writer at The Atlantic. She is a former deputy editor of the New Statesman, and has also written for The Guardian and The Sunday Times.

== Early life ==
Lewis was born in Worcester, England. She attended St Mary's School, Worcester, until 2001 and completed a Bachelor of Arts with honours in English at St Peter's College, Oxford, in 2004. In 2011, Lewis completed a Master of Arts in English at the Open University.

== Career ==
After graduating from Oxford, Lewis gained a post-graduate diploma in newspaper journalism from London's City University. Subsequently, she was accepted on the Daily Mail's programme for trainee sub-editors, working in the job for a few years, and later joining the team responsible for commissioning features for the newspaper. She was appointed the Women in the Humanities Honorary Writing Fellow at Oxford University for 2018/2019, and since 2019 has been on the steering committee for the Reuters Institute for Journalism at Oxford University, where she delivered a lecture on "The Failures of Political Journalism", subsequently adapted as a New Statesman cover story.

Lewis was appointed deputy editor of the New Statesman in 2012, after becoming assistant editor in 2010. Since July 2019, she has been a staff writer at The Atlantic.

In 2018, Lewis interviewed Jordan Peterson for GQ, in a video which has been viewed over 70 million times. She is a frequent panellist on BBC's Have I Got News for You.

== Difficult Women ==
Lewis's first book Difficult Women: A History of Feminism in 11 Fights, a history of the battles for women's rights, was published by Jonathan Cape on 27 February 2020. Difficult Women was featured in the New Statesman under "Books to Read in 2020", and in The Observer list of "Non-fiction Books to Look Out for in 2020".

== The Genius Myth ==
In 2025, Jonathan Cape published Lewis's second book The Genius Myth: The Dangerous Allure of Rebels, Monsters and Rule-Breakers. The Observer called it an "angry, witty book" while The Economist described it as "original and painfully timely".

== Broadcasting ==
In 2019, Lewis launched her BBC Radio 4 series, The Spark, a longform interview series with each episode dedicated to a single guest (or, in one case, two co-authors). The first four series have been collected by Penguin as an audiobook. In 2021, the BBC aired her comedy documentary series Great Wives. In 2022, Helen Lewis's eight-part podcast called The New Gurus aired on BBC Radio 4. In it, she investigated the popularity and influence of charismatic individuals from Russell Brand to Jordan Peterson.

Lewis presents the current affairs podcasts Page 94: The Private Eye Podcast, with Ian Hislop, Andrew Hunter Murray, and Adam Macqueen, and presented the first series of the Radio 4 programme Strong Message Here with Armando Iannucci.

== Views on feminism and transgender issues ==
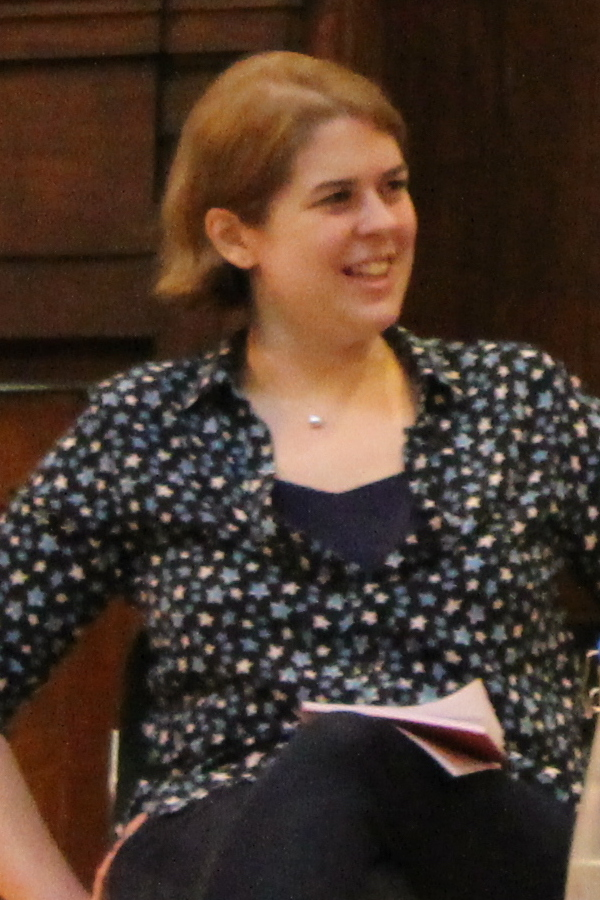
Lewis in 2017

In January 2013, Lewis edited a week of articles dedicated to transgender issues in the New Statesman, featuring articles by transgender and non-binary writers including Juliet Jacques, Jane Fae and Sky Yarlett. In the introduction, she wrote: "For anyone interested in equality, it should be obvious that trans people are subject to harassment simply for the way they express their gender identity."

In July 2017, Lewis wrote about her concerns that gender self-identification would make rape shelters unsafe for women and would lead to an increase in sexual assaults in women's changing rooms, writing: "In this climate, who would challenge someone with a beard exposing their penis in a women's changing room?"

In response to criticism for those comments, Lewis said: "I've had two tedious years of being abused online as a transphobe and a 'TERF' or 'trans-exclusionary radical feminist' – despite my belief that trans women are women, and trans men are men – because I have expressed concerns about self-ID and its impact on single-sex spaces." In November 2020, due to her statements, game developer Ubisoft removed from Watch Dogs: Legion two in-game political podcasts featuring Lewis's voice.

== Personal life ==
Lewis married Guardian journalist Jonathan Haynes in 2015. She was previously married in 2010 and divorced her first husband in 2013.
