= Independent Schools Council =

Public relations body for fee-charging schools

- Abbreviation: ISC
- Founded: 1974 (as Independent Schools Joint Council); 1998 (as ISC)
- Type: Lobby group
- Headquarters: Queen Anne's Gate; London, SW1
- Region served: Mainly United Kingdom
- Chairman: Mark Taylor
- Chief Executive: Julie Robinson
- Website: www.isc.co.uk

The Independent Schools Council (ISC) is a non-profit lobby group that represents over 1,400 private schools in the United Kingdom. The Council acts as an umbrella organization for seven independent school associations and coordinates efforts to promote the interests of its member schools within the UK education system, including liaising with the Department for Education. Approximately 6% of school-aged children in England attend independent schools affiliated with the ISC.

== History ==
The ISC was established in 1974 (originally as the Independent Schools Joint Council) by the leaders of the principal school associations and reconstituted in 1998 under the present name. ISC member schools are subject to inspection by the Independent Schools Inspectorate (ISI), which was separated from ISC in 2007 to become an independent limited company. The ISI reports to the Department for Education according to statutory requirements.

The current chairman of ISC is Mark Taylor. ISC is managed by the Chief Executive, Julie Robinson.

== Constituent associations ==
ISC comprises several constituent associations, representing different sectors of independent education:

- Girls' Schools Association (GSA) – heads of girls' senior independent schools.
- Headmasters' and Headmistresses' Conference (HMC) – heads of circa 300 boys', girls' and co-educational independent senior schools.
- Society of Heads (SoH) – heads of approximately 130 independent schools.
- Independent Association of Prep Schools (IAPS) – heads of more than 670 boys', girls' and mixed preparatory schools.
- Independent Schools Association (ISA) – nearly 600 boarding and day schools, including specialist schools.
- Association of Governing Bodies of Independent Schools (AGBIS) – the governing bodies of schools whose heads belong to GSA, HMC and SoH (and some belonging to IAPS & ISA).
- Independent Schools' Bursars Association (ISBA) – bursars of over 800 senior and junior schools.

== Activities and initiatives ==
ISC collects and publishes statistics about independent education in the UK. Its annual census reports pupil numbers, demographics, religious and ethnic diversity, and trends in school intake. In 2024, ISC schools enrolled approximately 556,551 pupils, with minority ethnic backgrounds represented among 41.7% of students and about 20% identified with special educational needs and disabilities (SEND). ISC schools range widely in size, with most enrolling fewer than 300 pupils.

Advocacy efforts focus on legislation, tax policy, and learning standards. ISC lobbies policymakers and responds to government proposals affecting independent education, such as the imposition of value-added tax (VAT) on private school fees in 2025.

== Partnerships with state schools ==
The ISC has promoted partnership activities between independent and state schools, including joint academies, shared facilities, teacher exchanges, and collaboration in extracurricular activities. According to ISC's own reports, thousands of partnerships are recorded annually, but independent evaluations of their impact and scope remain limited. Critics have questioned the effectiveness and equity of these partnerships, with some characterizing the initiatives as largely serving to enhance the reputation of private schools rather than substantially improving educational opportunities for disadvantaged pupils.

== Controversies ==
=== VAT on private school fees ===
ISC has played a prominent role in the ongoing debate over the addition of VAT to private school fees, a government policy enacted in 2025. The Council supported legal challenges against the policy, citing concerns about affordability and the impact on families with children who have SEND and other special requirements. The High Court dismissed these challenges, ruling that the VAT policy was established through parliamentary legislation.

=== Fee-fixing investigation ===
In 2005, the Office of Fair Trading found that a group of prominent private schools had engaged in anti-competitive fee information sharing, coordinated by the ISC, and imposed collective fines. The outcome was the establishment of a charitable trust to benefit affected pupils and greater scrutiny of fee-setting practices in the sector.

=== Judicial review of the Charity Commission, 2011 ===
In 2011, the ISC challenged the Charity Commission in relation to the latter's statutory guidance on public benefit. The Upper Tribunal heard the judicial review, which was combined with an Attorney General's reference, over five days in May 2011 and reserved judgment until October 2011. The lengthy ruling upheld ISC's main ground of complaint, which was that the guidance did not reflect the true state of charity law on public benefit and charities which charge fees. A subsequent hearing and ruling in December 2011 ordered that the Commission withdraw large parts of its guidance or face a quashing order. The disputed guidance was withdrawn shortly before Christmas 2011, and replacement guidance was put out to consultation in 2012.
