= Ayesha Siddiqa Girls School =

Islamic school in Southall, London Borough of Ealing

Coordinates: 51.5122°N 0.3839°W

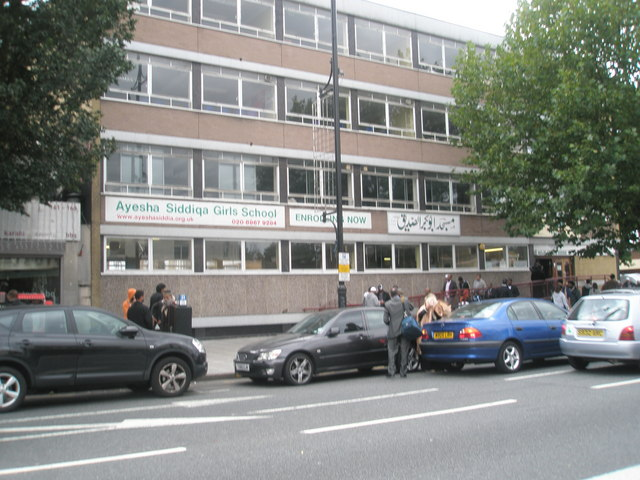

Location
- 165-169 The Broadway, Southall; London, UB1 1LS; England

Information
- Type: Private day school
- Religious affiliation: Islam
- Established: 25 January 2007
- Local authority: London Borough of Ealing
- Department for Education URN: 135155 Tables
- Ofsted: Reports
- Principal: Mrs Azraa Qureshi
- Gender: Female
- Age: 11 to 19
- Enrolment: 90 (2025)
- Capacity: 220
- Website: https://ayeshasiddiqa.org.uk/

Ayesha Siddiqa Girls School is an independent Islamic school in Southall, London Borough of Ealing, West London, England. It is located on the second and third floors of the Abu Bakr Mosque.

== History ==
The school opened in 2007.

=== Uniform Controversy ===
In 2013, the school attracted media criticism for its uniform policy. The school required all girls at the school to wear a headscarf at all times. It also required pupils to wear a navy blue burqa or jilbab when walking between lessons and when entering or leaving the school.

=== Employment Tribunal ===
In 2021, the school was sued by one of its employees for several issues, including making an unlawful deduction from her wages. The school agreed to pay the claimant £7.50 without admission of liability and the other issues were dismissed by the tribunal.
