= St. Hilda's School, Exeter =

St. Hilda's School

Location
- 2 York Road; Exeter, Devon, EX4 6QT; England

Information
- Other names: Branscombe House School
- Type: Private day and boarding school
- Religious affiliation: Church of England
- Established: c.1885
- Founder: Elizabeth Crabb
- Closed: 1942
- Gender: Girls

St. Hilda's School was a private day and boarding school for girls in Exeter, England. It was founded in the 19th century as Branscombe House School and permanently closed following damages in World War II.

The site included a preparatory school for boys and girls.

== History ==
The school was founded in the late 1880s in Branscombe House, York Road by sisters Elizabeth Crabb LLA and Kate Crabb. It proved very successful and in 1894 expanded into three of the taller houses next to Branscombe House. It changed its name in 1895 to St Hilda's.

In January 1905, a new lecture hall was opened by Helen Vincent, Viscountess D'Abernon, accompanied by her husband Edgar Vincent, 1st Viscount D'Abernon. In December of that year, the Archdeacon of Exeter Ernest Sandford said in a speech at St. Hilda's that it was "an excellent expression of a class of school for which he anticipated a very considerable future."

In 1905, Elizabeth Crabb offered a partnership to Alice Sandford, an ex-pupil with a B.A. from London University who became co-principal at St. Hilda's. After World War I, Misses Crabb and Sanford dissolved their partnership, leaving the latter as sole principal. When Sandford died on 27 June 1922, her sister Edith took charge of St Hilda's, which she ran with the assistance of her younger sister Mary.

During World War II, St Hilda's and the neighbouring pairs of houses were destroyed by German air raids. It closed in 1942. The surviving annexe, swimming pool, and dining room were used by neighbouring schools.
