= Beis Yaakov High School =

Jewish secondary school with academy status for girls

Location
- 69 Broom Lane; Higher Broughton; Salford, Greater Manchester, M7 4FF; England; 53.5092°N 2.2617°W

Information
- Type: Academy
- Religious affiliation: Charedi Judaism
- Established: 1957
- Local authority: Salford City Council
- Department for Education URN: 138698 Tables
- Ofsted: Reports
- Head teacher: Benjamin Myers
- Gender: Girls
- Age: 11 to 16
- Website: http://www.byjhs.org/

Beis Yaakov High School is a Jewish secondary school with academy status for girls. It is in Higher Broughton, Salford, in the English county of Greater Manchester. The school primarily serves the Haredi Jewish community in Salford, Bury, and Manchester. See Beis Yaakov for a discussion of the school's philosophy and positioning.

== History ==
It was founded as a private school in 1957, and became a state-funded voluntary aided school in 2005. The school converted to academy status in 2012.

The school was judged "Inadequate" by Ofsted in 2014 and placed into Special Measures. The school leaders complained to Ofsted over the conduct of the inspection, claiming that pupils had "felt bullied" by inspectors’ questions about homosexuality and interfaith friendships.

The School was declared as "Requires Improvement" by Ofsted in 2019. The rating was partly due to pupils not being taught about sexual orientation and gender identity. In response to this criticism, local dayan Gavriel Krausz sent leaflets to the school claiming that homosexuality was an "abomination" and that Jewish teachers should "give up their lives" rather than teach about homosexual relationships.

The School was again rated "Inadequate" and placed in special measures in 2022. The first line of the 2022 Ofsted Report stated that "Over time, leaders have prioritised the needs of staff to the detriment of pupils’ education. There is a deeply entrenched culture among staff of apathy and lack of routine. Staff do not take their roles as educators seriously enough."

In July 2023 a monitoring inspection concluded that the School had made some progress to address these failings but remained in special measures due to continuing inadequacies in quality of education and teaching.
