= The Study, Wimbledon =

Coordinates: 51°25′39″N 0°13′15″W

Information
- Established: 1893; 133 years ago
- Years: Reception - Year 6
- Gender: Girls
- Age: 4 to 11
- Website: www.thestudyprep.co.uk

The Study is an independent preparatory school in Wimbledon, London.

== History ==
The school was founded in 1893 by Miss Sidford, governess to the children of Sir Arthur Holland.

In 1939, the headmistress, Miss Gentian Challen, renamed the school to Beaufort School. It later reverted to its original name.

Originally teaching girls up to the age of 16, in 1988 the school governors made the decision to phase out the senior section. The school now only takes pupils up to the age of 11.

=== Car Crash ===
On 6 July 2023, a car crashed into an end-of-year tea party that was happening at the school. 16 pupils, parents, and carers were injured, including two schoolgirls who subsequently died.
