= St Louis Grammar School, Ballymena =

School in Ballymena, Northern Ireland

St. Louis Grammar School

Location
- Cullybackey Road; Ballymena, Antrim, BT43 5DW; Northern Ireland

Information
- Type: Grammar foundation school
- Motto: Ut Sint Unum ('That they may be one')
- Religious affiliation: Catholic
- Established: 1924
- Founder: St. Louis Order
- Principal: Mrs Jackie O'Neill
- Gender: Co-educational
- Age: 11 to 19
- Enrolment: 1093
- Houses: Laragh; Layde; Lisbreen; Lismoyle; Lurig; Lir (added in 2021); Lyndon
- Colour
- Website: http://www.stlouisgrammar.com

St Louis Grammar School is a school in Ballymena, Northern Ireland.

== History ==
The school was established in 1924 by nuns from the St. Louis Order. For thirty years the school, which was all-girls, was accommodated within the main convent building. With the increase in student numbers it was decided to build a new school which opened in September, 1954. However, the numbers continued to increase and an extension was added in 1969, providing more classrooms and library. In 1970, the school went co-educational and boys were admitted from September 1970.

The numbers continued to increase necessitating additional temporary accommodation. A totally new building was constructed on the site of the all weather pitch and opened in 1982. In 2019, additional performing arts facilities were built.

In 2020, the St. Louis Order transferred ownership of the school to the St MacNissi's Educational Trust of the Diocese of Down and Connor. This trust was established in 2004 and is responsible for 166 schools established by and associated with the parishes of the Diocese of Down and Connor.

== School principals ==
- –1987: Sister Sheila Canty
- 1987–2002: Mr. John Stuart
- 2002–2011: Mr. Frank Cassidy
- 2011–2021: Mr Sean Rafferty
- 2022– : Mrs Jackie O'Neill

== House system ==
On entry to the school, pupils are assigned to one of seven houses where they remain for the remainder of their time at the school. Six of these houses are named after townlands in the Glens of Antrim. The seventh, Lir, which was added in 2021, is named after an ancient Irish sea god.

== Academics ==
Besides the GCSE core subjects of English/English Literature, Mathematics, Religious Education and Science the following optional GCSE subjects are offered to pupils in Key Stage 4: Further Mathematics, Art & Design, Business Studies, Construction, Design & Technology, Drama, French, Geography, History, Home Economics, Information & Communication Technology, Irish, Music, Physical Education and Spanish.

Post 16 pupils are offered a choice of 3 or 4 A-Levels.

In the 2018 Belfast Telegraph GCSE League Table, it was ranked joint first in Northern Ireland for its GCSE performance with 100% of its 2016/17 entrants receiving five or more GCSEs at grades A* to C, including the core subjects English and Maths. In the 2019 League Table, it was ranked joint ninth with 99.3 of its GCSE entrants being awarded five or more a* to C grades.

In 2019 it was ranked First among secondary schools in Northern Ireland in terms of its A-level performance for the 2017/18 academic year. A total of 95.4% of its students entered for A-Levels achieved a grade of A* – C.

== Competitions, Olympiads and Sports Achievements ==
- Winners of Mageean Cup (Ulster Colleges' Senior Hurling Championship) 2015/2016 & 2022/2023
- Winners of the BM Quizzing Championships (NI Schools Quizzing Championships) 2022/2023
- Finalists of the National Awards for Pastoral Care 2022.
- Awarded ‘The Investors in Mental Health Award’ at the Aware NI Investors in Mental Health Awards 2022.

== Notable alumni ==
- Mark Cousins (born 1965) – Filmmaker and critic
- Michael O'Neill (born 1969) – football manager and former professional footballer
- Michael Hughes (born 1971) – retired footballer and co-owner of NIFL Premiership side Carrick Rangers.
- Daithi McKay (born 1982) – North Antrim MLA (2007–2016) and Newspaper columnist.
- Andy O'Boyle (born 1983) - Football director, Manchester United F.C.
- Tara McNeill (born 1988) – musician
