= Sarah Bonnell School =

Location
- Deanery Road; Stratford, Greater London, E15 4LP; England; 51°32′37″N 0°00′26″E

Information
- Type: Academy
- Motto: Be Proud, Aim High, Work Hard, Be Kind, No Excuses.
- Established: 1769
- Founder: Sarah Bonnell
- Local authority: Newham
- Department for Education URN: 142644 Tables
- Ofsted: Reports
- Head of School: Jess Carter
- Gender: Girls
- Age: 11 to 16
- Enrolment: 1185
- Colours: Sky blue, navy blue
- Former name: Sarah Bonnell Grammar
- Former name of building: Deanery High School
- Website: sarahbonnell.ncltrust.net

Sarah Bonnell School is a secondary school for girls, in Stratford, London. It was founded in 1769, though has had changes of name, status and location since then.

== History ==
The school was founded as a charity school and located opposite West Ham Church. In 1873 the school became an independent school charging fees, under the name West Ham High School for Girls. At this time it was in West Ham Lane. In 1905 it moved to The Grove, Stratford. In the 1920s the school became a grammar school. In 1944 it changed its name to Sarah Bonnell Grammar School and moved again, to St. George's Road, Forest Gate. In 1972 Sarah Bonnell Comprehensive School, moved to the former sites of Deanery High School for Girls and Stratford Green Secondary School in Deanery Road.

In 2017 Sarah Bonnell School converted to academy status. The school is now sponsored by the Newham Community Schools Trust as a comprehensive.
