= Madani Girls' School =

Madani Girls School
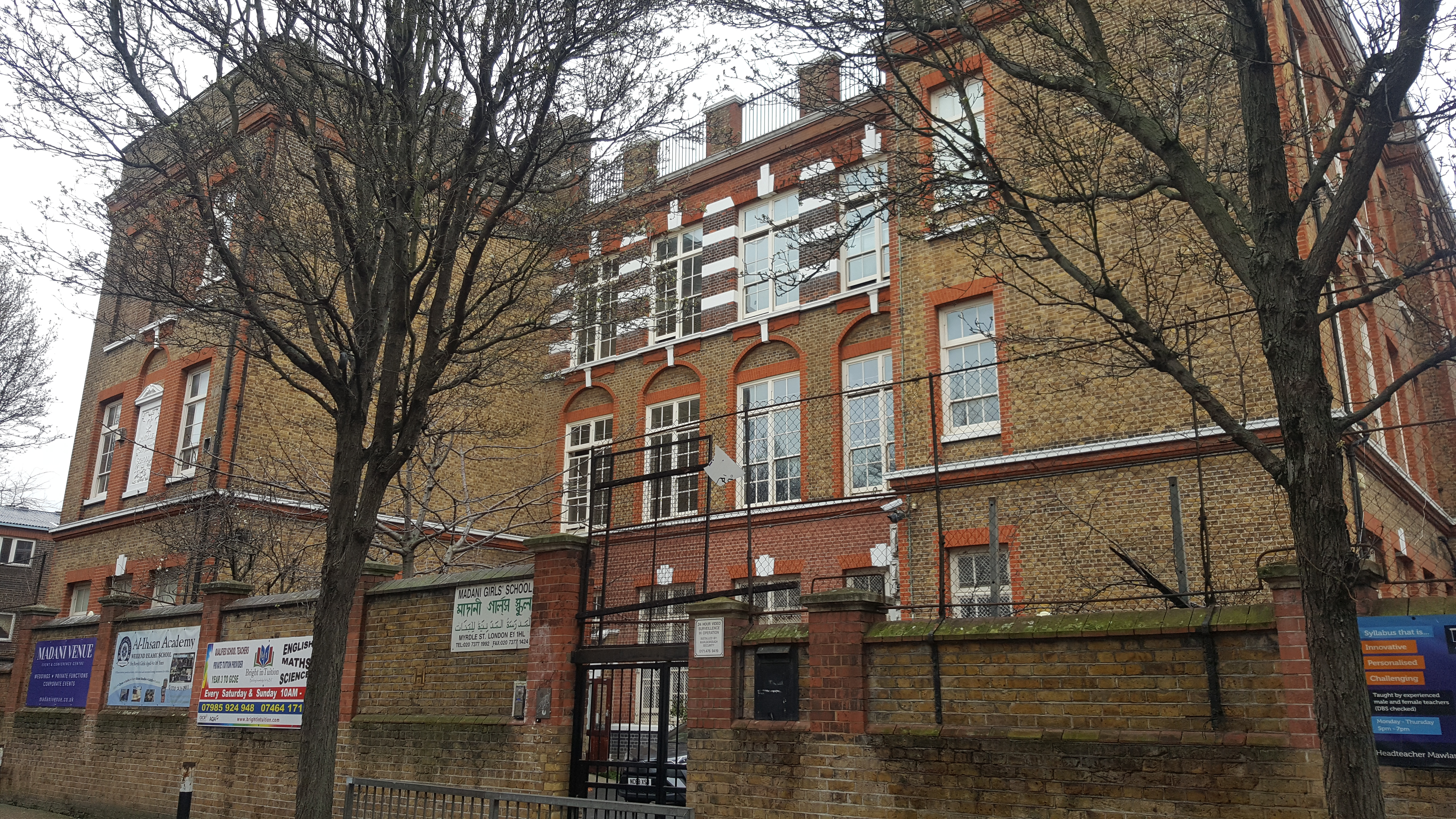

Location
- Myrdle Street; Whitechapel; London, E1 1HL; England; 51.515575°N 0.062898°W

Information
- Type: Private day school
- Religious affiliation: Sunni Islam
- Established: 1991
- Local authority: London Borough of Tower Hamlets
- Department for Education URN: 100982 Tables
- Ofsted: Reports
- Principal: Mft. M. Saifur Rahman
- Gender: Female
- Age: 11 to 18
- Enrolment: 264 (2025)
- Capacity: 360
- Colours: Green, black and white
- Website: https://www.madani.org.uk

Madani Girls School is a private Islamic secondary school in Whitechapel, London, and is located the London Borough of Tower Hamlets.

It also operates a college and alimah programme. The school opened in September 1991.

== Building History ==
The main (southern) school building was originally occupied by Myrdle Street Central School. It was designed in 1905 by Thomas Jerram Bailey, the Architect of the Education Department of the London County Council. Myrdle Street was one of the first of the LCC's "central schools" that offered higher than elementary education. The building is described in the Pevsner Architectural Guide for London East as a "unique, outstanding design" featuring two semicircular staircase towers with copper domes. It became a Grade II Listed building in 1973.

Notable former pupils of the Myrdle Street Central School include Hannah Billig, a British-Jewish doctor who worked in the East End during the London Blitz when she became known as "The Angel of Cable Street". Also Morris Harold Davis, the President of the Federation of Synagogues (1928–1944) and Labour Party politician.

After World War II, it became a special school and changed its name to Grenfell Special School, which closed on 31 July 1999. In 1977, the school began to be used as a social centre for the local Bangladeshi community, including evening language classes.

== School History ==
Madani Girls' School was founded in 1991.

In 2001, Madani Girls' School leased the northern building at the school's current location from the council to use as an independent school. In 2008, they purchased the building from Tower Hamlets council.

In 2013, the school attracted media criticism for its uniform policy. From the school's opening in 1991 until 2012, students were required to wear a niqab on the journey to and from school. By 2013, Pupils were required to wear a black burqa and long black coat outside the school and a green shalwar kameez on school premises. By 2016, face veils had become optional.

In 2020, construction for a two storey annex building with a playground started. Construction is intended to be completed in December 2021. The building is called the Madani Hub.
