= St Genevieve's High School =

Non-selective school in Belfast, Northern Ireland

St. Genevieve's High School

Location
- 87 Stewartstown Road; Belfast, County Antrim, BT11 9JP; Northern Ireland

Information
- Type: non-selective
- Motto: Ut Sint Unum (So that they may be one)
- Religious affiliation: Catholic
- Established: 1966
- Local authority: Education Authority (Belfast)
- Principal: Cathy Austin
- Staff: 70
- Gender: Girls
- Age: 11 to 18
- Enrolment: 1000 (approx)
- Colour
- Website: https://stgenevieves.org.uk/

St Genevieve's High School is a Catholic Maintained School for girls. It is located in the Andersonstown area of west Belfast.

== History ==
The school was opened by the Sisters of St. Louis on 1 September 1966. On opening, the school had 550 pupils and 26 teachers. The principal was Sr. Mona Lally. Although it is no longer governed by the nuns, the educational philosophy of the school continues to be based on that of the Congregation of the Sisters of St Louis. The trusteeship of the school passed from the St Louis Order to the Diocese of Down and Connor in 1995.

In 1972, at the height of the Troubles, the school was taken over by the British army. The army were in residence in the school for three months.

In 1986, Sister Luca Henry was appointed Principal. She was subsequently offered an OBE but declined the award in solidarity with the local community which was experiencing so much suffering.

== Facilities ==
The school was originally located on the Glen Road but in 1992 moved to the Trench House site on the Stewartstown Road.

== Academics ==
The full range of subjects is offered. At GCSE A-level, the students can choose courses from Art and Design, Biology, Business Studies, Chemistry, Drama & Performing Arts, English Literature, Government and Politics, Health and Social Care, History, Irish, Maths, Media Studies, Moving Image Arts, Music, Religion, and Sociology. They can also take other course options and BTEC qualifications in collaboration with students from the nearby De La Salle College, Belfast.

The government inspection of the school in 2014 assessed its overall performance as being Very Good.

== Sports ==
The students have the opportunity of participating in such sports as netball, Gaelic football, swimming, basketball, camogie, athletics, and soccer.

== Community Action ==
The students are encouraged to participate in various community activities such as raising funds for the St Louis Missions in Brazil and Africa, for food hampers for disadvantaged older citizens, for Christmas presents for disadvantaged children.

In 2021, the school was awarded the Worldwise Diplomatic Passport award at the Global Schools National Conference. This award recognises schools that have demonstrated high levels of commitment to global justice helping to make the world a more equitable and sustainable place.

== See also ==
- List of secondary schools in Belfast
- List of secondary schools in Northern Ireland
