= Ağbiz =

- Location within Azerbaijan
- Coordinates: 39°12′32″N 46°37′40″E
- Country: Azerbaijan
- District: Zangilan
- Time zone: UTC+4 (AZT)
  - Summer (DST): UTC+5 (AZT)

Ağbiz (Aghbiz) is a village in the Zangilan District of Azerbaijan.
