= Feversham Girls' Academy =

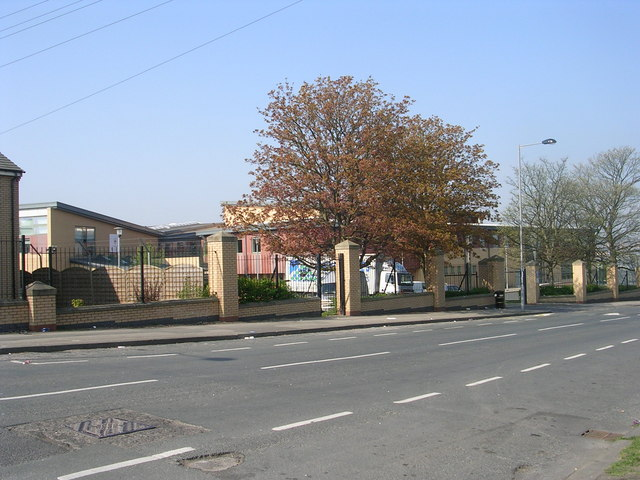
- The school seen from Cliff road (2011)

Location
- 158 Cliffe Road; Undercliffe; Bradford, West Yorkshire, BD3 0LT; England; 53.8056°N 1.746°W

Information
- Type: Academy
- Religious affiliation: Islam
- Local authority: Bradford
- Department for Education URN: 136962 Tables
- Ofsted: Reports
- Headteacher: Sajida Muneer
- Gender: Girls
- Age: 11 to 18
- Enrolment: 800 as of October 2018
- Colours: grey, green
- Website: https://feversham-academy.fetrust.org.uk/

Feversham Girls' Academy (formerly Feversham College) is an Islamic secondary school and sixth form for girls located in the Undercliffe area of Bradford, in the English county of West Yorkshire.

It was established in 1994 as a private school, before becoming a state-funded voluntary aided school in 2001, coordinating with Bradford City Council for admissions. The school converted to academy status in 2011.

Feversham Girls' Academy offers GCSEs and Cambridge Nationals as programmes of study for pupils, while students in the sixth form have the option to study from a range of A-levels and BTECs. The school also has a specialism in science.
