= Convent of the Assumption =

Catholic private school in Devon, England

Coordinates: 50.6854°N 3.2510°W

The Convent of the Assumption at Sidmouth, Devon, was a Catholic girls-only, private boarding school.

== History ==
=== Arrival of the Sisters of the Assumption (1882–1914) ===
The Sisters of the Religious of the Assumption are a Catholic, female congregation founded in Paris in 1839 by Saint Anne Eugenie Milleret (in her religious life took the name Marie Eugenie of Jesus) along with Fr. Theodore Combalot. The nuns of this congregation arrived in Sidmouth in 1882 first settling at Cottington House, before relocating to their new, purpose-built convent two years later (in 1884). The convent's chapel served the local Catholic parish at this time.

It was reported at the laying of the foundation stone in 1883 that a chapel, convent and residence for a Mrs Monteith was being built on land on the Knowle estate and Mrs Monteith was defraying the cost. The buildings, described as ‘simple’ were built by a local builder. The estimated cost was between £2000 and £3000 and it was anticipated it would take 12 months to build.

Boarding House and Holiday Retreat

The convent took in female boarders. Advertisements were placed in newspapers from 1895. ‘Lady boarders received at the Convent and in a Villa adjoining. Climate mild and healthy. Apartments filled up with home comforts. For particulars apply to the Rev. Mother Superior’. By 1906 advertisements were being placed nationwide. ‘Assumption convent, Sidmouth, Devon. Lady boarders received in well furnished apartments, healthy position, lovely views of sea and country, excellent cuisine and attendance, terms moderate. Apply Superior’. In the 1901 census all of the boarders, who were single or widowed, were not in employment but living by private means. There were still a handful of these boarders in the 1939 census.

In 1885 an advertisement for retreats was placed. ‘Convent for the Assumption Sidmouth. The nuns receive a few delicate children for education and ladies for private retreats at any time throughout the year’ In 1897 the convent was recommended as a Catholic holiday resort and there were many visitors as well as the borders. ‘The nuns devote themselves to teaching, and are always most ready and willing to instruct the children of visitors in their cathecism’.

One notable boarder was Pauline Hingeston (1840-1906), a major benefactoress of the convent. Miss Hingeston moved to Sidmouth from Brighton following the death of her mother. There is a memorial plaque in the chapel and she is buried in the convent graveyard.

The Assumption Orphanage and school

The Assumption Orphanage for girls and a school was established at the convent in 1898. £1000 was raised and a two storey building was attached to the convent. The ground floor was a refectory and parochial voluntary school and upstairs a dormitory and further classroom. It was reported at the laying of the foundation stone that children would be educated in practical and technical subjects rather than theoretical and scientific and ‘they were not taught subjects that would not be of use to them in life to be a good servant’. According to the census’ there were 15 orphans resident in 1901 and 13 orphans in 1911. Girls in the orphanage, who came from anywhere in the country, were sponsored or maintained through funds raised. The orphanage was discontinued in 1914 and subsequently a fee paying boarding school was established.

=== A school is established (1914–1976) ===
One of the founding motivations for the congregation was the "regeneration of society through the education of girls and women" therefore, when three Belgium girls sheltering from the devastation of the Great War were not able to return home (and were subsequently joined by other girls from Belgium), the sisters decided to begin teaching at the site. The first lessons were held on 13 September 1914. The convent's Mother Superior from 1911 to 1928, Ellen Lansdell (9 April 1861 – 18 June 1949), a nun who was also known as Mother Lelia, is credited with starting to teach at the site (along with two other sisters), effectively founding the school. In 1921 there were 55 girls boarding at the school.

=== House system ===
There were two houses that the students gained admission to once they had achieved high academic and sporting prowess and demonstrated good conduct; these were St. Paul's (green) and St. Peter's (red).

== British Council association ==
The convent school at Sidmouth was the first and only independent preparatory school to be members of the British Council's Education Counselling Service, which accounts for the large international presence from the school's earliest days.

== St. John's School, Devon (1976–present) ==
The former convent's buildings now form St John's School, an independent, co-educational day and boarding school for children aged 2.5-16. In 2007, the school was brought under the International Education Systems (IES) umbrella.

== Associated people ==
- The English Rugby player Joe Launchbury attended St John's, as did cricketers Adam Dibble and Jodie Dibble
- The English hymn writer Matthew Bridges (14 July 1800 – 6 October 1894), who wrote the lyrics to Crown Him with Many Crowns along with Godfrey Thring, had a home at the site and is buried there.
- Mother Margaret McFarlin, nun and educator, and the person credited with steering Siegfried Sassoon towards the Catholic faith, taught at the convent. Sassoon once described her as "the greatest benefactor of my life".
- The English scholar, Christopher Dawson sent both his daughters to board at the convent in Sidmouth.
