= Sir Jonathan North College =

Location
- Knighton Lane East; Leicester, Leicestershire, LE2 6FU; England; 52.606794°N 1.124581°W

Information
- Type: Academy
- Local authority: Leicester
- Trust: Lionheart Educational Trust
- Department for Education URN: 146108 Tables
- Ofsted: Reports
- Executive Principal: James McKenna
- Associate Principal: Helen Coles-Hennessy
- Girls: girls only
- Age: 11 to 16
- Enrolment: 1210
- Website: https://www.sirjonathannorth.org.uk/

Sir Jonathan North College is an all-girls multi-faith state secondary school located in Leicester, England.

== History ==
It was founded in 1904 by Rev. David Field, a wealthy land owner from Wigston. The current building was opened in 1937 and consisted of what is now known as the Macaulay building. This was surrounded by playing fields most of which are now covered with new buildings - the old Latimer building was erected in the 1970s, the Wycliffe building was erected in 1996, the De Montfort Building was erected in 2004, the Knighton Tennis Centre was erected in 2008, and the new Latimer building was erected during the BSF period in 2014. The school was awarded Specialist school status for visual arts (in 2001), science and mathematics (in 2005), and vocational learning (in 2006). In 2016 they were awarded the World Class Schools Mark by OFSTED.

Previously a community school administered by Leicester City Council, in March 2019 Sir Jonathan North College converted to academy status. The school is now sponsored by the Lionheart Academies Trust.

== Divisions ==
There are five main blocks at the college; there is the Wilma Pearl block, where humanities and ICT are held, the Murasaki Shikibu block, where English and modern foreign languages are held, the Dorothy Hodgkin block, where Science and maths classes are held, the Zaha Hadid block, where Expressive Arts and Art classes are held and Hawkins -named after the suffragette, Alice Hawkins- where physical education is taught.
