= Girls' Schools Association =

UK trade association for girls' schools

- Abbreviation: GSA
- Formation: 1874
- Purpose: Professional association for headteachers of independent and state girls' schools
- Headquarters: Suite 105; 108 New Walk; Leicester; England
- President: 2026–27: Helen Jeys, Head Mistress, Manchester High School for Girls
- President-Elect: 2026–27: Jane Gandee, Headmistress, St Swithun's School
- Honorary Treasurer: Richard Tillett, Principal, Queen's College, London
- Chief Executive: Jeanette Cochrane
- Affiliations: ISC
- Website: gsa.uk.com

The Girls' Schools Association (GSA) is a professional membership association representing the heads of independent and state girls' schools in the United Kingdom. Founded in 1874 as the Association of Headmistresses, it is one of the oldest organisations dedicated to girls' education. The association is a constituent member of the Independent Schools Council (ISC) and works with organisations including the Association of School and College Leaders (ASCL).

== History ==
The GSA originated as the Association of Headmistresses (AHM), founded in 1874 by Dorothea Beale and Frances Buss to promote opportunities for girls' education.

Over the following century the organisation played a significant role in the development of girls' secondary education and professional collaboration between headteachers.

The organisation later became the Girls School Association (Independent and Direct Grant) before adopting its current name, the Girls' Schools Association.

=== Timeline ===
- 1874 – Association of Headmistresses founded by Dorothea Beale and Frances Buss.
- 1902 – Expansion of girls' secondary education following the Education Act 1902.
- 1944 – Equal provision for boys' and girls' secondary education established through the Education Act 1944.
- 1973 – Girls School Association (Independent and Direct Grant) established.
- 1978 – Association of Headmistresses merges with the Headmasters' Association to form the Secondary Heads Association.
- 1990s – Organisation adopts the name Girls' Schools Association.

== Organisation ==
The association is headquartered in Leicester and is a constituent association of the Independent Schools Council.

It is led by:

- a President, elected from among serving member school heads;
- a Chief Executive, responsible for the strategic and operational leadership of the association.

Since 2025, the Chief Executive has been Jeanette Cochrane.

== Membership ==
Membership comprises the heads of girls' schools across the United Kingdom, including:

- Independent Schools;
- State Schools;
- Boarding Schools;
- Day Schools;
- Junior/Prep Schools;
- Senior Schools.

== Activities ==
The association supports member schools through:

- Professional development and leadership programmes;
- Conferences and networking events;
- Research into girls' education;
- Policy engagement and advocacy;
- Guidance and resources for school leaders.

== Research and publications ==
The Girls' Schools Association publishes research on girls' education and has commissioned studies from organisations including ImpactEd Evaluation and AQR International. Its research has examined academic attainment, participation in STEM subjects, post-16 destinations, physical activity, gender equality, social and emotional outcomes, and the experiences of girls with special educational needs and disabilities (SEND).

=== Academic attainment, STEM and destinations ===
GSA has published analyses of Department for Education and UCAS data concerning attainment and subject choices among pupils at girls' schools.

- The Academic Attainment and Representation of Girls in STEM analysed Department for Education school-performance data, comparing attainment and participation in mathematics, science and computing subjects at girls' and co-educational schools.
- Girls' Academic Attainment and Representation in STEM and Economics combined Department for Education data, UCAS applications data and a survey of alumnae. It considered A-level subject participation, applications to university courses and employment in STEM-related fields.
- Girls' Schools and Positive Post-16 Destinations examined Department for Education destination measures for Key Stage 5 and post-18 progression. The report compared sustained education, higher-education, apprenticeship and non-sustained destinations by gender and school type.

=== Experiences and outcomes in girls' schools ===
GSA has also commissioned research examining pupils' and other stakeholders' experiences of single-sex education.

- In 2022, GSA and ImpactEd published Understanding the Experience of Girls from Disadvantaged Backgrounds and Girls with SEND in Single-Sex Schools. The study compared social and emotional outcomes for girls in single-sex and co-educational schools, with particular attention to disadvantaged pupils and pupils with SEND.
- Investigating Pupils' Perception of Equality for Women and Girls at Single-Sex Schools, produced with ImpactEd Evaluation, examined how pupils understood gender equality, differences by age and pupil characteristics, and teachers' confidence in discussing the subject.
- To mark GSA's 150th anniversary in 2024, ImpactEd Evaluation conducted a study entitled Investigating the Role of Girls-Only Schools in Preparing Students for Their Future Endeavours. Based on surveys of pupils, parents, teachers and alumnae, it examined perceptions of the benefits of girls' schools and how they prepare pupils for their personal and professional lives.
- A 2021 study by AQR International, Soft Skills Development and Gender, analysed measures of mental toughness among pupils at UK independent schools. The report included comparisons between girls attending single-sex and co-educational schools.

=== Sport and physical activity ===
GSA research on sport has considered girls' participation in physical education and access to sports traditionally associated with boys and men.

- Girls and Male-Dominated Sports reported the results of surveys of GSA senior schools concerning the provision and uptake of sports including football, rugby and cricket.
- Sport Participation in Girls' Schools examined curriculum physical education and extracurricular participation across different age groups. It also considered barriers to participation including confidence, menstruation, stereotypes and sporting injuries.

== See also ==
- Girls' Day School Trust
- Independent Schools Council
- List of girls' schools in the United Kingdom
- Single-sex education
- The Headmasters' and Headmistresses' Conference
