= King Henry VIII School =

There are several schools named for King Henry VIII, including:

- King Henry VIII School, Coventry, Coventry, England
- King Henry VIII Preparatory School, Coventry, England
- King Henry VIII Grammar School, Abergavenny, Wales
