= George Frederic Cannons =

English photographer

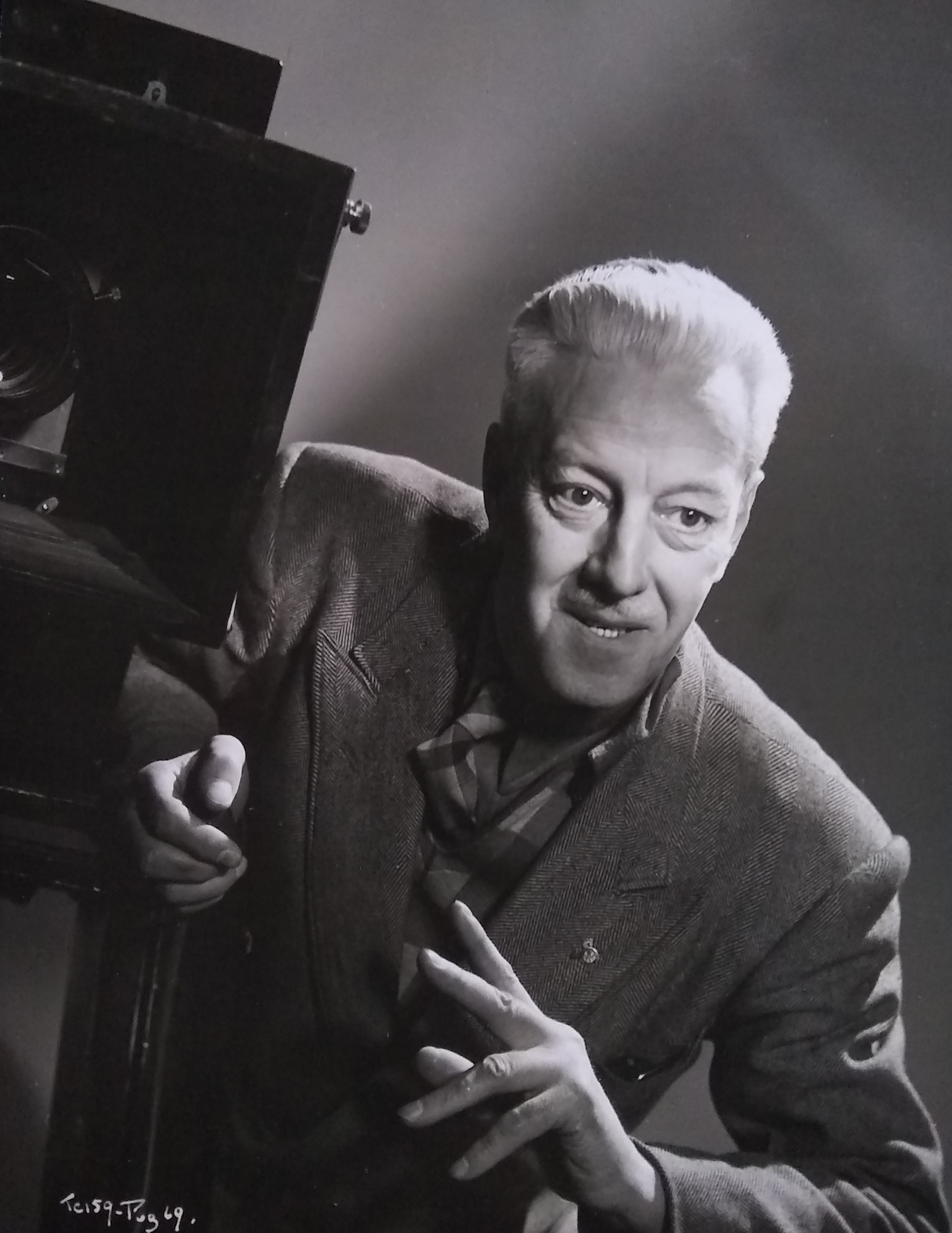
- Self-portrait- date unknown
- Born: 8 July 1897; London, England
- Died: 27 April 1972 (aged 74); Salisbury Wiltshire, England
- Known for: Portrait photographer
- Spouse(s): Mae Margareet Spencer, Ruby Grace Estes. Vera Brightling Tester
- Children: 5
- Parents: Harry George Tuner Cannons; Annie West

George Frederick Cannons (1897–1972) was a Hollywood portrait photographer of the 1930s. Professionally known as Cannons of Hollywood. Cannons worked in both Hollywood and London.

George Cannons was born July 8, 1897, and after serving in France during World War I and working as a photographer for a leading radiologist in London he went to California via Canada in 1922. His reputation as a stills photographer was first established during the silent film period, whilst working for Mack Sennett from 1924. Cannons was the official photographer of Mack and specialised in portraits of Sennett's bathing beauties.

During 1927 Cannons opened his Little English Studio on Sunset Boulevard in Hollywood, opposite the new Garden of Allah Hotel. Cannons divided his time between his own independent work and that with Mak Sennett. During the past year[1927] Mr Cannons' services were sought by most of the prominent stars and players in Hollywood.

In the early 1930s he continued working in Hollywood with portraits of leading stars including Dolores del Río and Jean Harlow. After returning to England in 1934 he set up his own studio in Dover Street in central London known as Cannons of Hollywood and exploited his Hollywood credentials and specialised in glamour portraits.

Cannons found work hard to come by due to the number of established photographers in London's West End. This led Cannons to seek work as a stills photographer for J. Arthur Rank who was based at Pinewood Studios and he was assigned to work with Michael Powell and Emeric Pressburger on two of their finest films. In 1946 he created the colour portraits of Jean Simmons during the filming of Black Narcissus. These images were featured in film annuals like Film Review by F. Maurice Speed.

In 1948 he was promoted to the position of principal stills photographer on The Red Shoes and responsible for the iconic stills of Moira Shearer during the ballet sequence. His publicity portraits of Moira Shearer, Anton Walbrook, Leonide Massine and Ludmilla Tchérina for The Red Shoes are also particularly striking. This undoubtedly elevated his career and along with Fred Daniels he was credited as the best portrait photographer to work with Powell and Pressburger. He continued to work for the Rank Organisation and in 1949 he took a series of portraits of Valerie Hobson which are in the National Portrait Gallery collection in London. He died in Salisbury, Wiltshire 27 April 1972.

== Life ==
=== Early years in the UK ===
George Frederic Cannons was born on 8 July 1897 and his birth was registered at Islington South West on 6 October 1897 with an Entry Number 441 in Book 94. His father was Harry George Tuner Cannons (Head Librarian, Finsbury Borough) and his mother Annie Cannons (née West). George Cannons had one sibling, a sister Winifred Gertrude Cannons who was born in 1899, who never married and had no children. Little is known about his early years apart from a certificate of attendance at Sunday School mornings at St Philip's Tottenham, dated Christmas 1909. Cannons was enlisted as a Private on 4 September 1914 in the 12 Battalion London Regiment. Cannons sent a Christmas card from France in 1917 with a photograph of the Battalion with approximately 50 personnel. In 1918 the Battalion held a show A.P.S.S.B.E.F. France, with 15 acts including a chorus, illusionist, comedian, bass and burlesquers. Pte. Cannons was the stage manager for the production. Cannons was issued a Certificate of Disembodiment on 22 April 1919. Interestingly his Disembodiment Certificate states his date of birth was 1895, rather than 1897 as recorded on his birth certificate.

=== And to North America ===
Cannons at the age of 23 travelled on 10 July 1920 from Liverpool, England to Quebec on the ship Megantic, landing on 19 July 1920. Cannons wrote in a 1933 article, Twelve years ago I was broke. England did not seem to have very much to offer a returned soldier, so I went to Canada, working my way across the continent at anything that turned up until I reached Los Angeles. On 12 October 1920 Cannons travelled from Vancouver B.C. to the United States for a 'brief, temporary sojourn only' depositing a head tax on that date. Cannons returned to Canada and married Mae Margaret Spencer who was born 27 May 1890. Mae Spencer Cannons died at the age of 32 in 1922 in Portland, Multnomah, shortly after their marriage. They had no children.

Cannons continued to write in 1933, It would be romantic to say that I arrived in the film city equipped with boundless optimism and my trusted and faithful friend, my camera, but the hard fact that my faithful friend was reposing in a Montreal pawnshop, and I had nothing but the boundless optimism! Cannons continues "Still, I must admit that this carried me quite a long way, for I was able to persuade Mack Sennett, of Keystone Comedy fame, to put me in charge of his "still" photograph department. It was to be my job to see that the cinemas and newspapers and magazines of the world were supplied with pictures of Harry Langdon, Ben Turpin, and all the beautiful bathing blondes who glorified the screen in those unsophisticated days and I thought I had landed in clover. Things didn't seem quite so rosy when I found I had to provide all my own cameras and equipment, but once again the old optimism didn't let me down. I found an Englishman who was running a photographic supplies business, convinced him that I had an honest face, and induced him to give me credit for all the stuff I wanted."

Cannons opened his own studio in Los Angeles, and he wrote I had visions of all the brightest and most beautiful stars queuing up on Sunset Boulevard for the privilege of being photographed by "Cannons of Hollywood." They didn't do much queuing at first. You see, it is heart breakingly difficult for a free-lance photographer to get any kind of footing, since it means "cutting in" on the work of cameramen employed by each company. In a job of this kind, it is only by personal recommendation that you get anywhere, but once my first sitters were happy with their portraits-and more important still, when those portraits began to appear regularly in practically every magazine in America - then the rest was comparatively easy.

=== Back to London ===
The President of The CAST Ltd, Clifford Robertson, wrote a letter to Cannons on 7 October 1932 saying The many pictures you have made for "The Cast" have been so fine and created so much favourable comment that it is with deep regret we way Au Revoir "Bon Voyage". Letter to George F. Cannons. 7 October 1932.

On 8 October 1932, the Vice President of Milton Weinberg Advertising Co. wrote a letter to recommend the exceptional photographic abilities of Mr George Cannons. He continues, "During the past five years our organization has depended entirely upon Mr. Cannons for every phase of our work concerning the camera. His reputation as a photographer in Hollywood is worldwide, and we consider his work as a commercial photographer equally fine. We rate him as one of this country's outstanding photographers.

Cannons opened a studio on the first floor of the building at 1 Dover Street, London. On Tuesday January 24th, 1933, he held an opening exhibition about his portraits of Hollywood celebrities. Portraiture Popularity reported that "Cannons provided excellent consolation in the most generous and variegated array of cocktails and I was able to catch sight of some intimate and finely composed portraits of Dietrich, of Anna May Wong, to Ben Turpin and ....Frank Turttle. Cannons' work- or what I saw of it-is arresting in its quality, intimate and revealing of character."

One of Cannons' first undertakings was to make a series of pictures for The Radio Pictorial in 1935. Nina Mae McKinney was photographed by Cannons and was featured on the magazine cover.

The Liverpool Evening Express published an article entitled My Sitters, The Stars by Cannons of Hollywood in 1934. You will have heard good deal about the "grooming" process by which a girl is prepared for stardom, photographed to advantage and publicised all over the world. Girls in the process of "grooming" have been sent to me from various studios, and it has been my job to get the best possible pictures of them. Cannons took photographs of Dolores de Rio and he stated that he contributed to the building of her career. Cannons continues I dispense with all the usual trappings of the photographic studio. Too many photographers "dramatize" the camera-making their subjects nervous in consequence- but II have found it best never to put on an "act". Instead, I make it more of a party of the proceedings, taking my subjects naturally during the course of conversation. Moreover, I work without make-up.

The P.P.A exhibition of 700 camera portraits at Princes Galleries opened on September 17, 1935. The British Journal of Photography reported Next we come to the Hollywood portraits. These are of very large size and are most of stage and screen celebrities, as indeed is to be expected. Technically, Mr Cannons is as good as the best. Every one of these prints is of splendid quality, clean and clear and telling. The composition is simple and unambiguous and any one of these prints could have taken its place with dignity and impressiveness among the photo posters of the P.P.A. Commercial Exhibition. The Northern Chronicle reported on the exhibition stating that Hollywood has given a lead to British Photographers. Cannons of Hollywood have sent in seven photographs which are in a class by themselves.

Cannons photographed Lady Alexandra Haig, eldest daughter of Field Marshal Douglas Haig in 1938 and her picture was published in The Tatler 5 January 1938.

David Niven in his book 'The Moon's a Balloon' writes that he was taken by Nessie in uniform to a photographer in Piccadilly called Cannons of Hollywood and had me preserved for posterity.

The Star reported on 5 July 1941, that Cannons is now "still" photographer at Gainsborough's Islington Studio, working on the film version of "Hi Gang". The article continues Since those early days many of the almost legendary beauties of American films - Jean Harlow, Norma Tahmadge, Loretta Young, Carole Lombard, Dolores del Rio and Jeanette MacDonald among them - have owed much of their fame to the art of Cannons, who is now photographing Bebe Daniels, Ben Lyon and Vic Oliver.

The Secretary General of the British Film Academy wrote to Cannons on 10 May 1948 informing him that your still of Jean Simmons as Caroline in Uncle Silas had been chosen as the best Portrait Head Female in the Exhibition (Two nominations). Your still of Jean Simmons as Kanchi in Black Narcissus has been chosen as the best Colour Portrait.

== Gallery ==
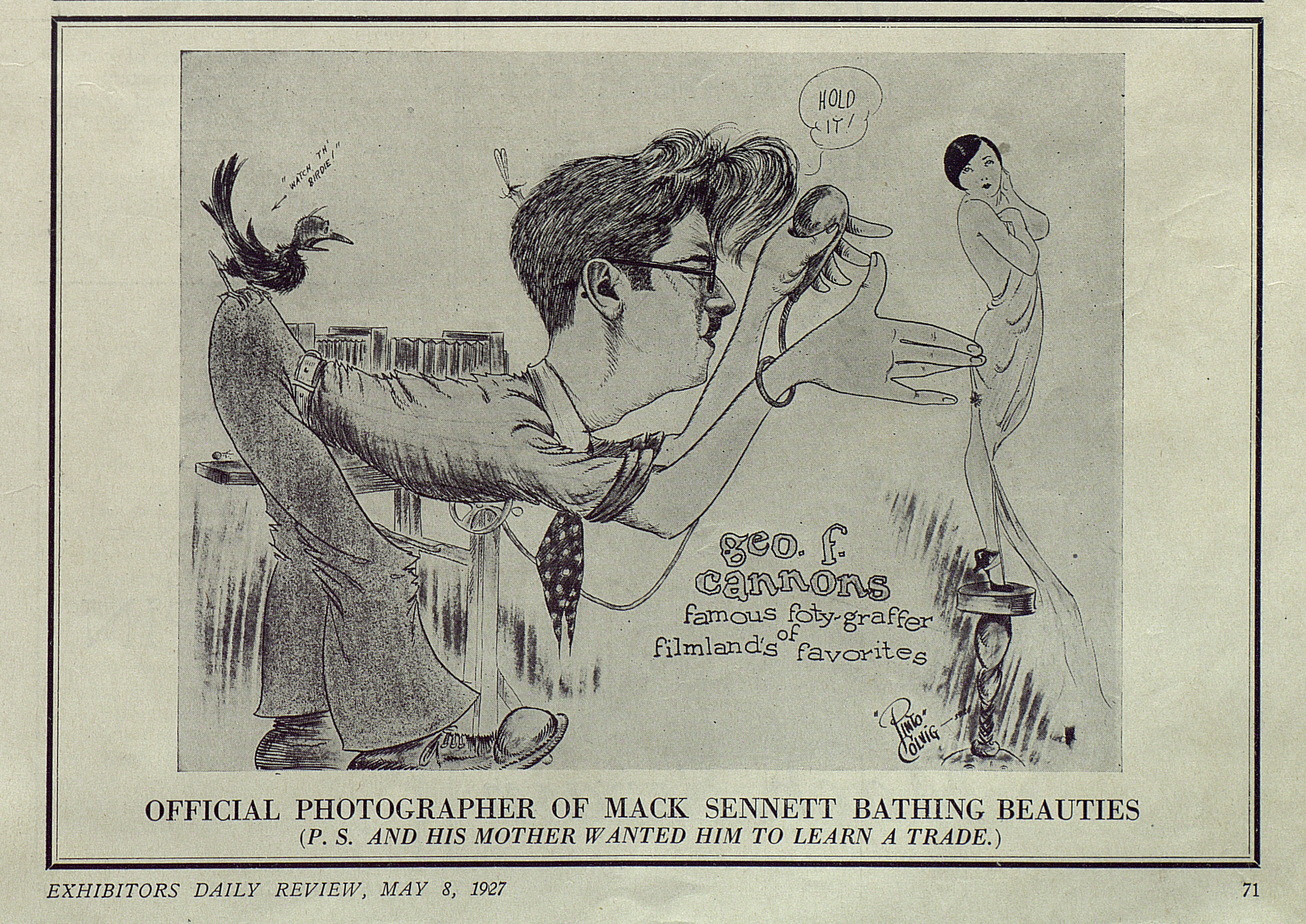
Caricature of George F Cannons by Pinto Colvig

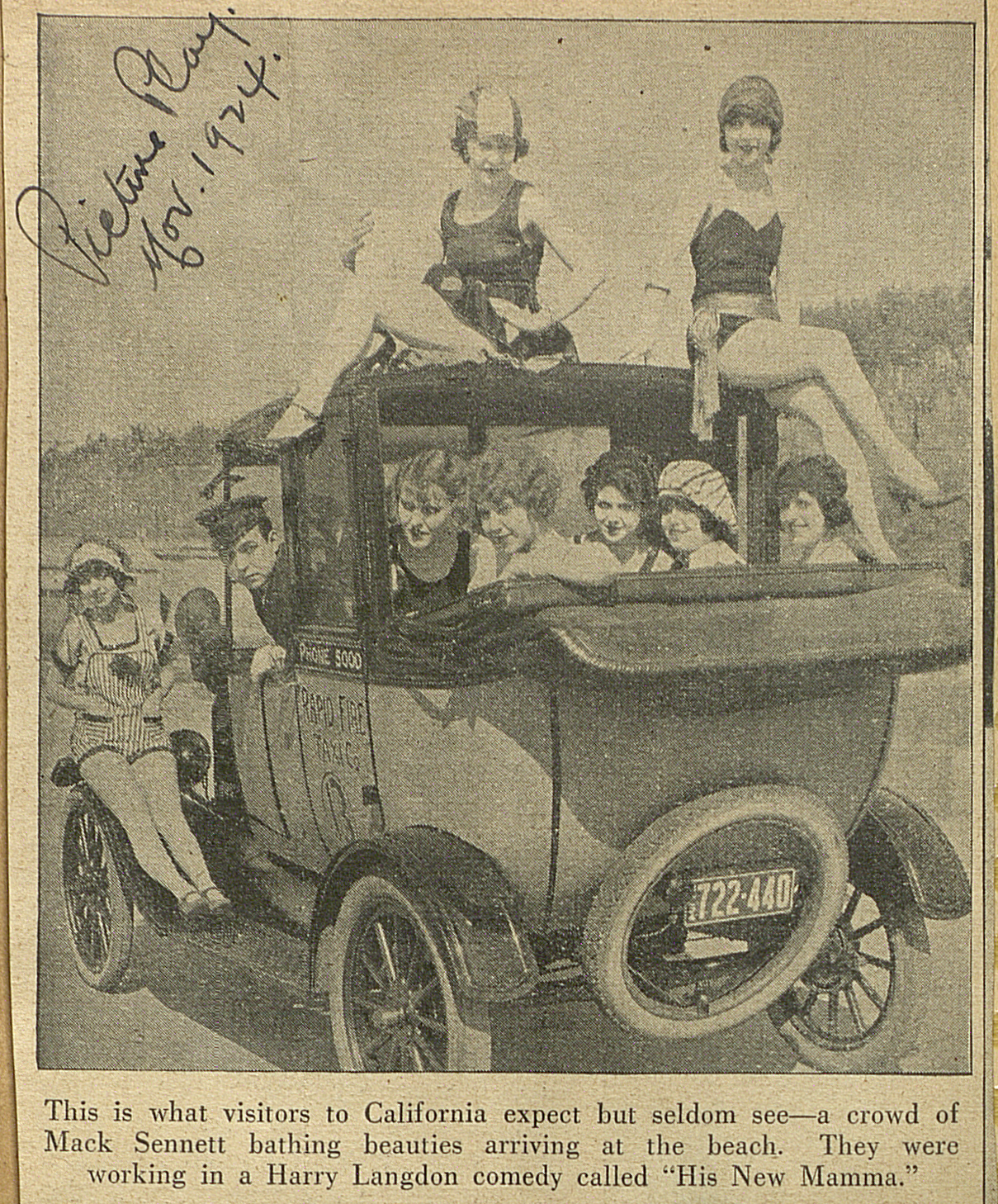
Bathing Beauties photographed by George F Cannons 1924

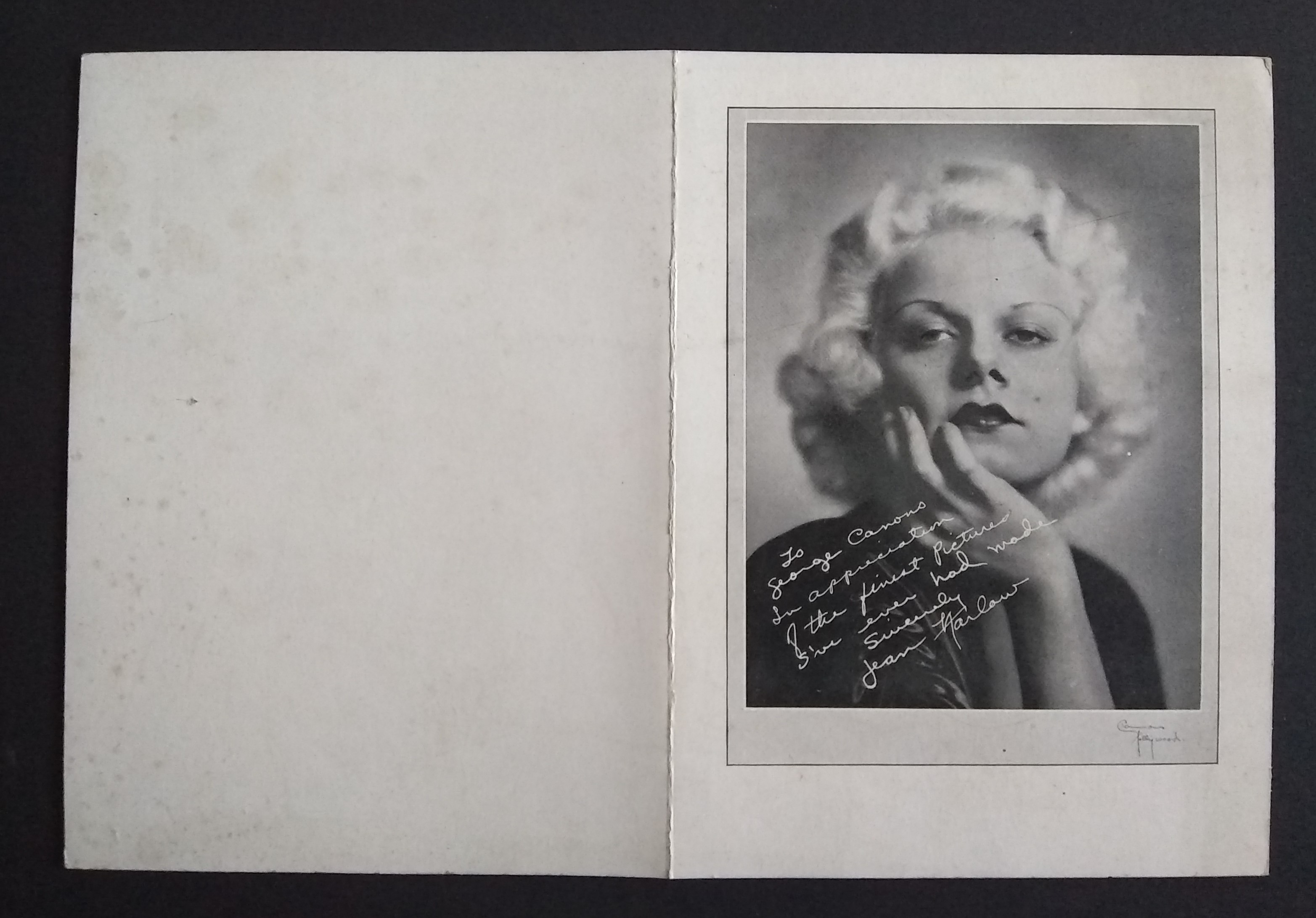
Invitation by Cannons of Hollywood to his studio opening at 1 Dover Street, London, Front cover with photograph by Cannons of Hollywood of Jean Harlow

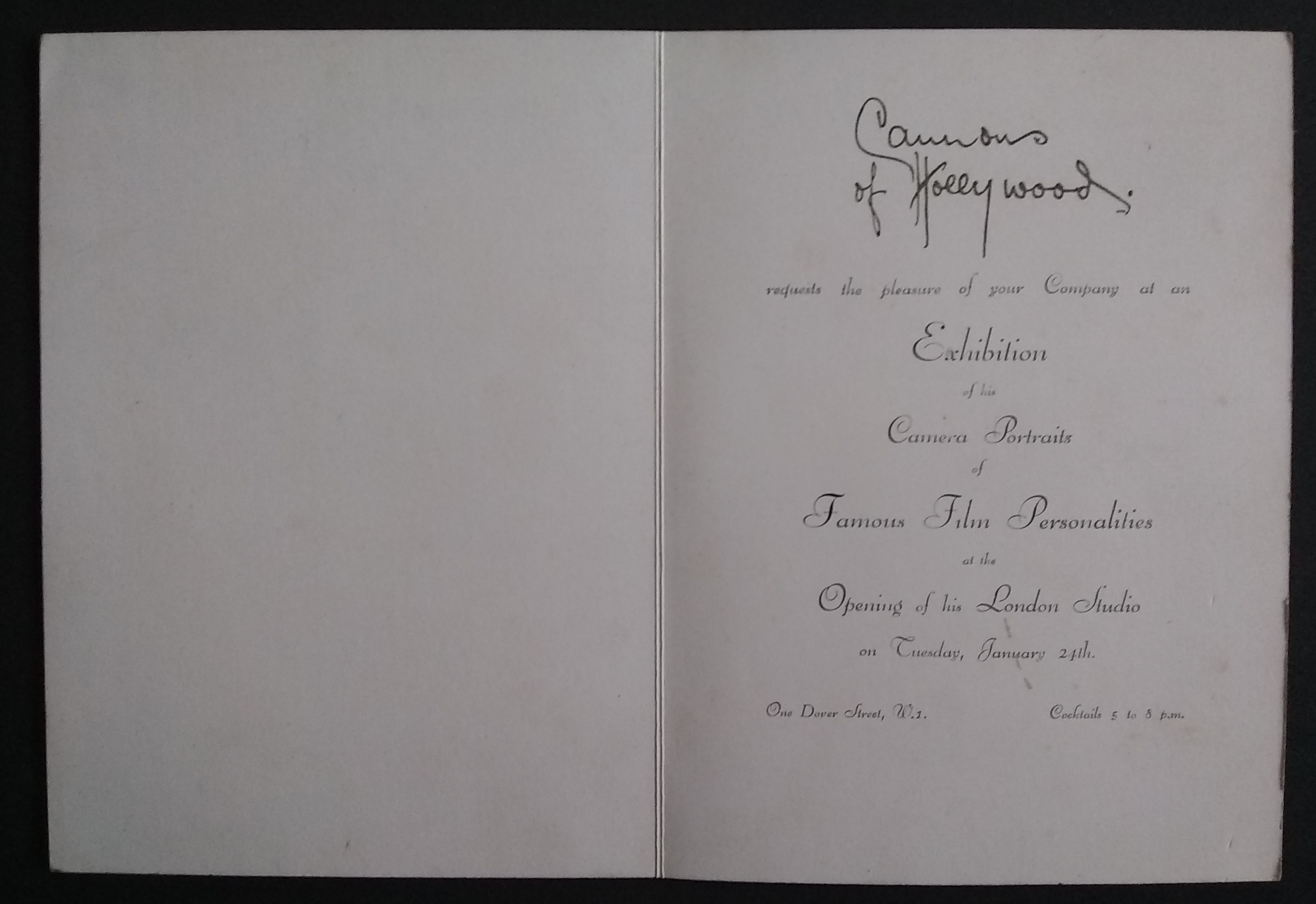
Invitation by Cannons of Hollywood to his studio opening at 1 Dover Street, London, Inside page
