= Tooby =

Tooby is a surname. Notable people with the surname include:

- John Tooby (born 1952), American anthropologist
- Michael Tooby (born 1956), Welsh researcher and curator
- Angela Tooby (born 1960), British Olympic athlete
- Susan Tooby (born 1960), married name Susan Wightman, British marathon runner and twin of Angela
