= Bablake School =

Co-educational private school in Coventry, England

Location
- Coundon Road; Bablake; Coventry, West Midlands, CV1 4AU; England; 52°24′49″N 1°31′17″W

Information
- Type: Private day school
- Motto: Spiritus Vicis (The Spirit of Opportunity)
- Established: 1560; 466 years ago
- Local authority: Coventry
- Chair: Coventry School Foundation
- Headmaster: Andrew Wright
- Gender: Co-educational mixed
- Age: 3 to 19
- Enrolment: 719
- Houses: Bayley, Crow, Fairfax, Wheatley
- Colours: Maroon and gold
- Website: bablake.com

Bablake School is a co-educational private day school in Coventry, England. It was founded in 1560. It is part of the Coventry School Foundation, a registered charity, along with King Henry VIII School, King Henry VIII Preparatory School and Cheshunt School. Bablake is a selective, independent school and a member of the Headmasters' and Headmistresses' Conference.

== History ==
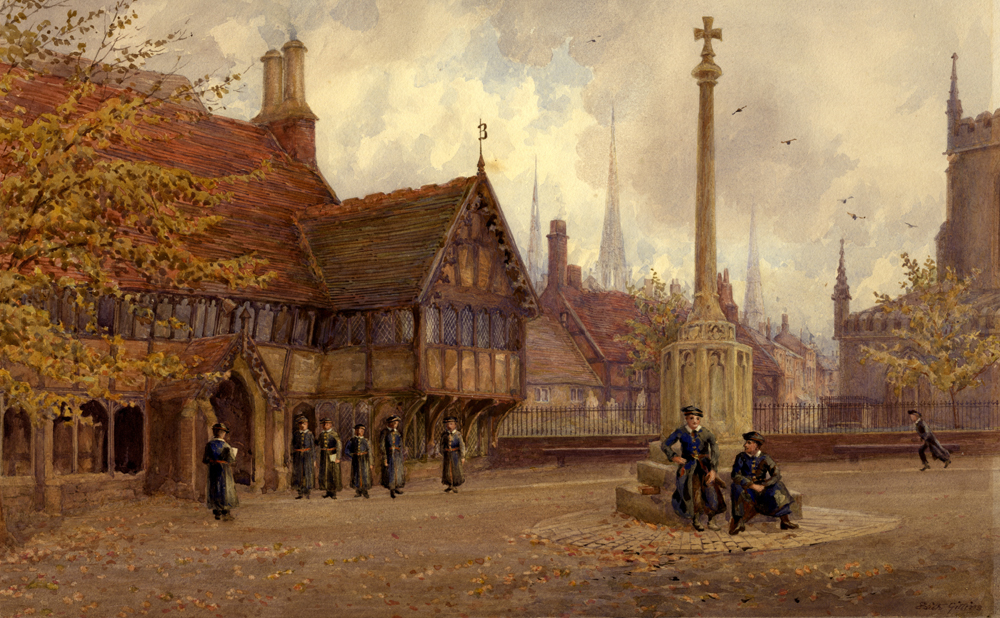
The school in the 1860s.

The school was founded in 1560 with 21 boys.

Bablake church, now known as St John's, stands adjacent to the school's original buildings. The school holds concerts in the church, and has sung Evensong there. Many of the pupils were originally choristers of the church. The relationship continued through the figure of Edward Jackson, who from 1734 was vicar of the church and headmaster of the school. The expansion of the Bablake site continued via land grants. In the 1890s, Bablake moved to its current site in Coundon Road, where it continued as a public school with six all-boys' boarding houses.

In the 1930s, fifty acres of land on Hollyfast Road were purchased to expand the playing fields of the school. During the Second World War, the school was evacuated to Lincoln. In 1975 the first female pupil was admitted. The school had already stopped taking boarders. In the late 1980s the school built its modern languages block; a few years later Bablake Junior School opened and in 2000 the English, drama and music block was completed, sited on what was originally the headmaster's garden.

In October 2020, it was announced that Bablake would merge with King Henry VIII School. The proposed new school was initially named Coventry School, before backlash from parents and staff led to Bablake and King Henry VIII School being chosen. The combined school was planned to open in September 2021. The plan was abandoned during the course of 2021, with the decision to share some facilities and teaching between King Henry VIII School and Bablake School. In June 2022, governors agreed to return to the original name, Bablake School.

== Structure ==
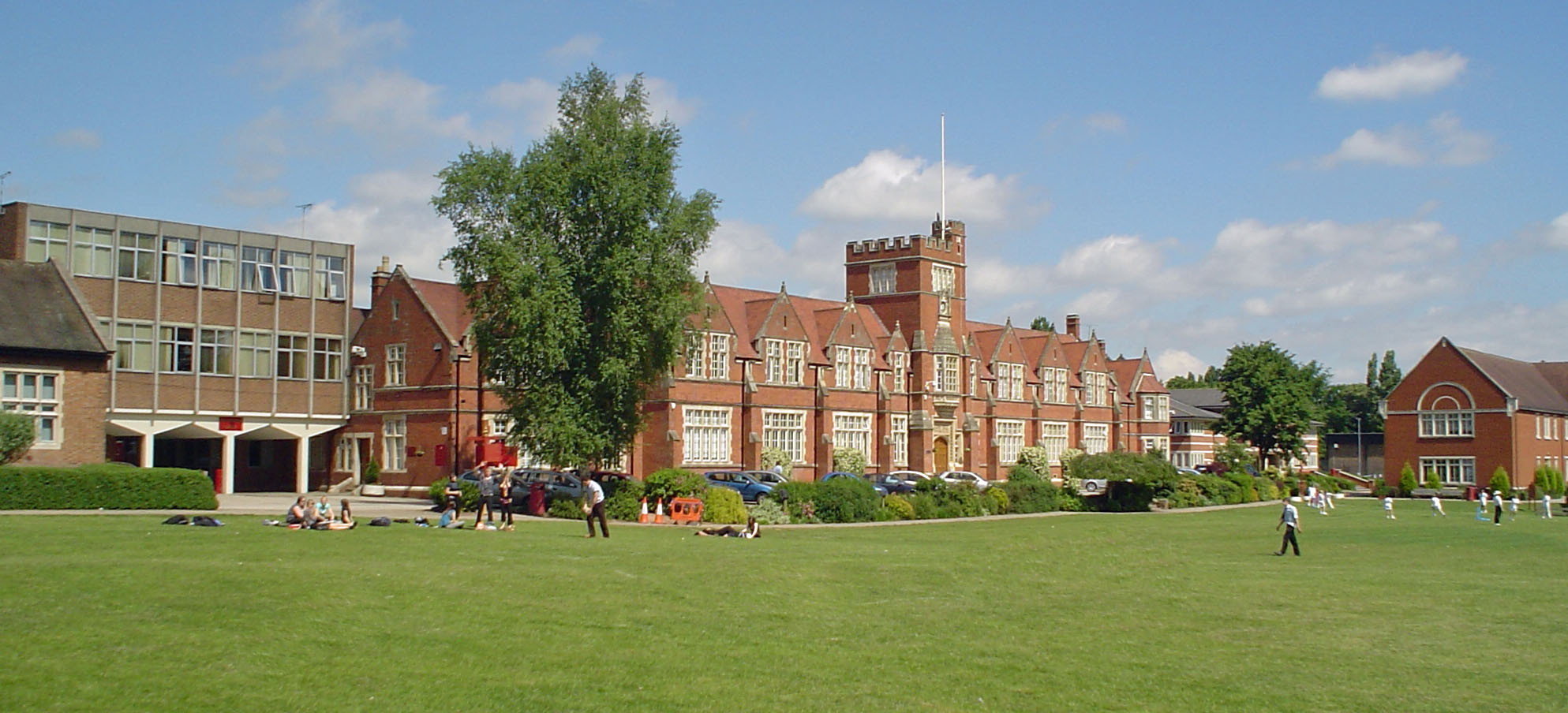
Main school building in the centre, with the English, Drama and Music block and the Language block to the right of the photo; Sixth Form block and Science Quadrant to the left

The Bablake site houses two schools: a junior school that takes children between year 3 and year 6, and a senior school that takes children between year 7 and sixth form.

The school uses the house system.

== Facilities ==
The school has a swimming pool and indoor sporting facilities on site including an indoor artificial climbing wall and fully equipped gym. It also has four tennis courts, which are used as netball courts at other times in the year. Off site there are rugby pitches, hockey astroturf and cricket squares.

In the English/Drama/Music block there is a theatre and a rehearsal room.

== Notable former pupils ==
- Kare Adenegan, won 2018 BBC Young Sports Personality of the Year
- Mark Best, cricketer for Loughborough MCCU
- Paul Best, cricketer for Warwickshire
- Olivia Broadfield, singer-songwriter
- Robert Clift, hockey player, Olympic gold medallist
- Norman Coke-Jephcott, composer and organist
- Martine Croxall, BBC News presenter
- Fred Daniels, film still photographer
- John Egan, industrialist
- Geoff Evans, rugby player
- Tony Fairbrother, aeronautical engineer, flight test engineering on the maiden flight of the de Havilland Comet, the first jet airliner
- Shane Geraghty, rugby union player
- Courtenay Griffiths, criminal barrister
- Kenneth Hegan, England international footballer
- John Herington, military historian and airman
- Melissa Kite, journalist
- Leonard Lord, industrialist
- Tony Mottram, tennis player, former British number 1
- Brian Matthew, broadcaster
- Jack Parsons, cricketer
- Angus Russell, businessman, former CEO of Shire plc
- James Shelley, educationalist, critic and broadcaster
- Nick Skelton, showjumper, Olympic gold medallist
- Nicholas Thompsell, High Court judge
- Donald Trelford, journalist, former editor of The Observer
- Melissa Walton, Hollyoaks actress, as Loretta Jones

== Appearances in the media ==
Part of the 2009 Christmas film Nativity! was filmed at the school.

The first three episodes of the 2019 BBC Two series Back in Time for School, covering the period from 1895 to 1959, were filmed at the school.

== See also ==
- Grade I listed buildings in Coventry
- List of the oldest schools in the United Kingdom
