= King Henry VIII Pre-Prep =

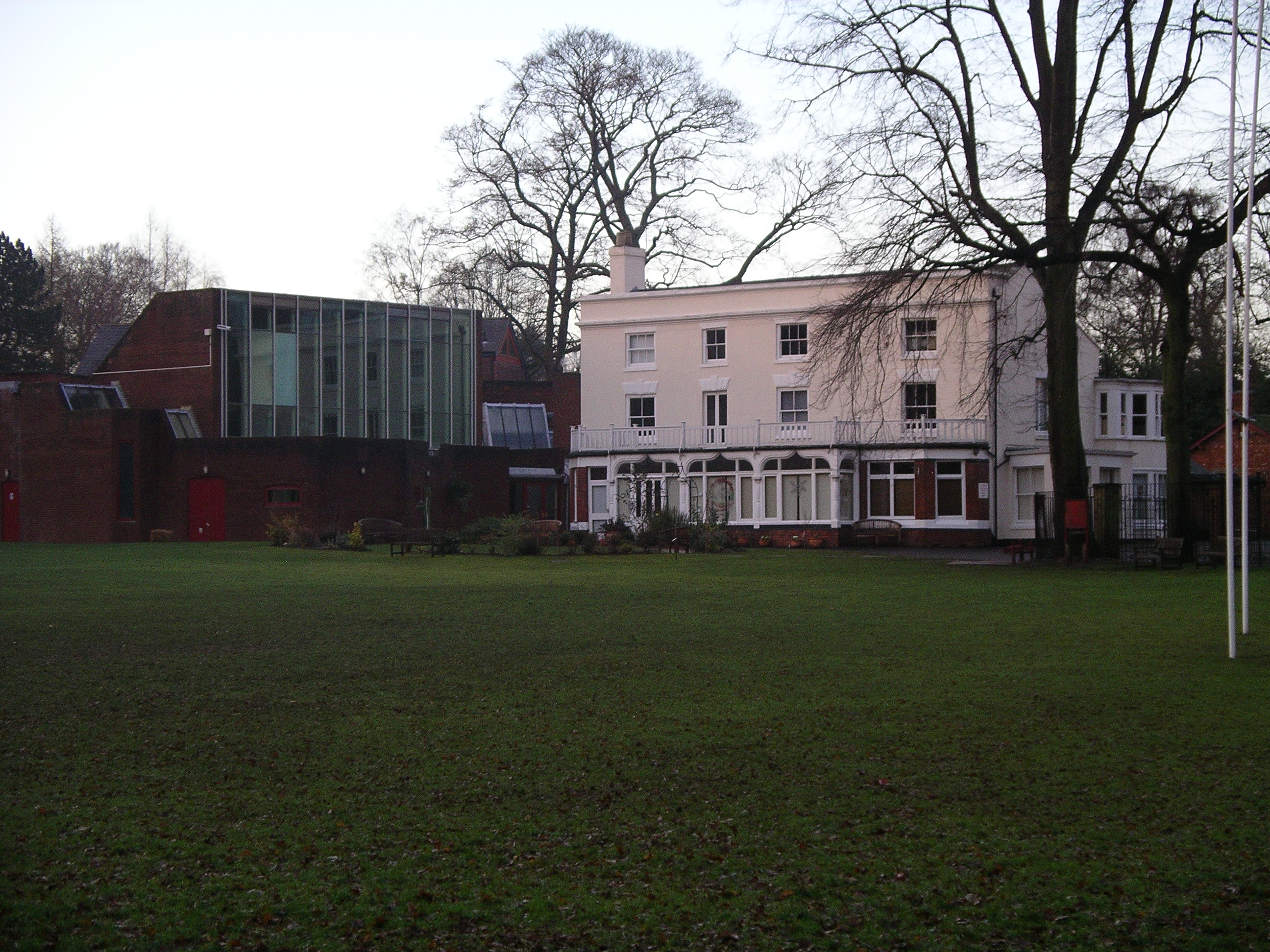

Location
- The Firs; Kenilworth Road; Coventry, West Midlands, CV3 6PT; England; 52.3958°N 1.5223°W

Information
- Type: Preparatory school
- Religious affiliation: Christian
- Established: 1920
- Founder: Rev. Kenelm Swallow
- Local authority: Coventry
- Principal: Mr Chris Staley
- Head teacher: Mrs Tracy Horton
- Years offered: Nursery - Year 1
- Gender: Coeducational
- Age: 3 to 7
- Website: https://kinghenrys.co.uk/pre-prep/

King Henry VIII Pre-Prep is a private school in Coventry, England with pupils aged from 3 to 7 years old. It also has a Nursery, Little Swallows. Its main building and playing field overlook the War Memorial Park, and its main gates are on The Firs, a street off Kenilworth Road.

The school is part of the Coventry School Foundation, a registered charity which also owns King Henry VIII School and Bablake School.

== History ==
Coventry Preparatory School was also known as "The Swallows", after Rev. Kenelm Swallow, who founded the school in 1920. The main building of the school was previously a large house, built in 1720. It has been owned by the Coventry School Foundation since 1992. In September 2007 the School opted to take pupils up to age 11 years and no longer accepted children aged from age 11 to 13 years.

The school was re-formed in September 2008 when Coventry Preparatory School merged with King Henry VIII Junior School to form the new King Henry VIII Preparatory School. The two school sites were maintained and the Coventry Preparatory School site took pupils from three to eight years old and the King Henry VIII Junior School site took the older children from 8 to 11 years old.

In 2020, a proposed merger was announced between King Henry VIII School and Bablake School. All preparatory students would be taught at the King Henry VIII site and all senior students would be located at the Bablake site. The relocations never occurred but the Swallows site was closed.

The site re-opened in September 2024 and was renamed to the King Henry VIII Pre-Prep. The school now has pupils aged 3 to 7 years old. The site is now shared and used as the offices for the Coventry School Foundation.

== Notable alumni ==
Dr Tim Joiner: (1961–1968) Lord Mayor of the City of Westminster 2005–2006. Deputy High Steward of Westminster Abbey 2005–2006, UK National Canoe Champion 2005. Member of the Metropolitan Police Authority 1998–2000.
