= Mark Best =

English cricketer (born 1994)

Personal information
- Full name: Mark Treloar Best
- Born: 24 November 1994 (age 31); Nuneaton, Warwickshire, England
- Batting: Left-handed
- Bowling: Right-arm medium
- Relatives: Paul Best (brother)

Domestic team information
- Years: Team
- 2013–2014: Loughborough MCCU

Career statistics
Competition	First-class
Matches	4
Runs scored	120
Batting average	20.00
100s/50s	0/1
Top score	50
Catches/stumpings	1/–
- Source: Cricinfo, 6 August 2020

Mark Treloar Best (born 29 November 1994) is an English former first-class cricketer.

Best was born at Nuneaton in November 1994. He was educated at Bablake School, before going up to Loughborough University. While studying at Loughborough, he made four appearances in first-class cricket for Loughborough MCCU, making two appearances each in 2014 and 2015. He scored 120 runs in his four matches, at an average of 20.00 and with a high score of 50 against Sussex in 2014. His brother, Paul, played first-class cricket at county level.
