= Nicholas Thompsell =

British judge

The Hon. Mr Nicholas Thompsell
- Royal coat of arms of the United Kingdom

High Court Judge
- Incumbent
- Assumed office 2024

Personal details
- Born: 27 September 1959 (age 67)
- Education: King's College London

Sir Nicholas Thompsell (born 27 September 1959) is a High Court judge (Chancery Division).

He was educated at Bablake School and at King's College London (LLB, 1982; AKC). He was appointed as a Deputy High Court Judge in 2019, and became a bencher at Lincoln's Inn in 2024.
