= Roger Harrabin =

British journalist (born 1955)

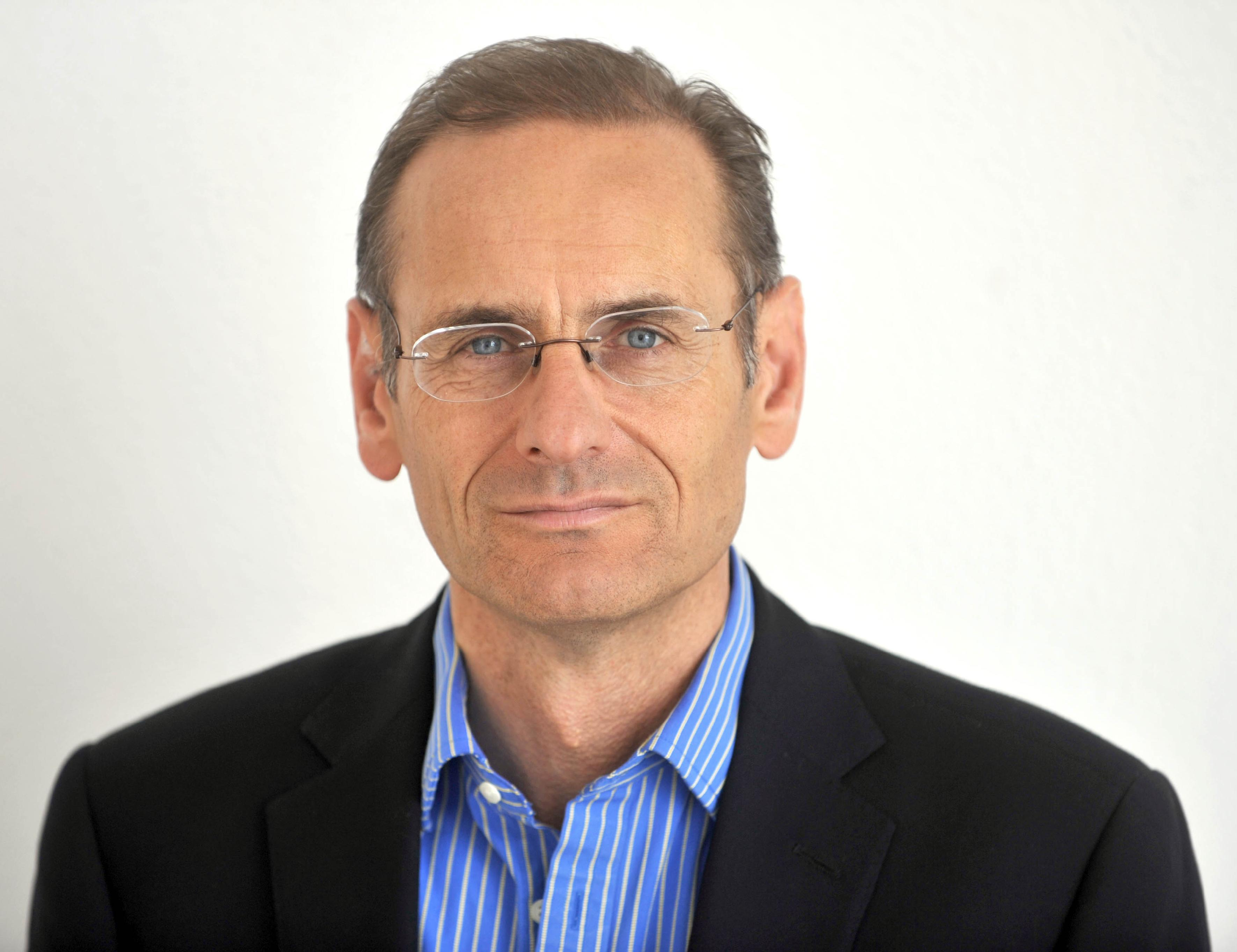
- Born: Roger John Harrabin; 28 March 1955 (age 71); Coventry, England
- Education: Stivichall Primary School; King Henry VIII School
- Alma mater: St Catharine's College, Cambridge
- Occupations: Television and radio reporter and presenter
- Years active: 1978–present
- Spouse: Anne Lewthwaite (1983–present)

Roger Harrabin (born 28 March 1955) is a British journalist who was the BBC's energy and environment analyst until July 2022. He has broadcast on environmental issues since the 1980s and has won many awards in print, TV and radio. Aside from his speciality he has covered many major general news stories. He is an honorary Fellow at St. Catharine's College, Cambridge, a visiting fellow at Green Templeton College, Oxford, an Associate Press Fellow at Wolfson College, Cambridge, and has received an honorary Doctorate of Science from Cranfield University.

== Early life and career ==
Harrabin was born and raised in Coventry, England, where his father ran a building firm with his wife and brother. He attended Stivichall Primary School and King Henry VIII School. He then studied English at St Catharine's College, Cambridge, where he was president of the Junior Common Room. He started a college newspaper.

He began his career on the Coventry Evening Telegraph. He developed a specialism reporting on the city's ethnic minority population, who were previously largely ignored in the media. He won a prize in the British Press Awards in 1980 for a series of features tracing the roots of Coventry Asians back to Pakistan and India.

He joined the independent Thames Television News as a producer while also freelancing for several years as a Saturday sports sub-editor in Fleet Street on the News of the World and the Sunday Mirror. During a spell at BBC Radio London he revealed how the Metropolitan Police was training its riot control officers using Roman Army tactics.

== BBC career ==
Harrabin joined BBC radio's The World at One, where he won a succession of Media Natura Environment Awards for reports on issues related to the environment and development. He also won the One World Media Award after revealing how changes in trade rules would affect sugar workers in Guyana, and a Sony Silver Award for reports on development dilemmas in Africa. He was shortlisted for Sony Reporter of the Year.

BBC Radio 4's Today programme created a roving role for him, and he spent a decade there travelling widely, reporting and organising series on issues like globalisation, health and the role of women. He won an award for an investigation into flower-growing in Kenya which showed that multi-national companies tended to take better care of their workers than local firms. He won another award for a feature on child labour in Bangladesh which demonstrated that for many girls, work in a "sweatshop" was preferable to the other alternatives of prostitution or working as a domestic servant in the Persian Gulf.

Harrabin retired from the BBC in July 2022.

== Environmental issues ==
In 2004, the BBC created the role of Environment Analyst so Harrabin could work across all media. He did reports for Newsnight on uncertainty in climate forecasting and on geoengineering to combat climate change. He won the Media Natura Award for TV documentaries for Gas Muzzlers, a film on green energy investment in President Bush's America.

In 2007 he shared the Media Natura TV News award for films on the Ten O'Clock News. One report from Bangladesh highlighted the need for climate adaptation – a topic little discussed at the time. Another report revealed how China was building two power stations a week. A third demonstrated why the Chinese need to increase energy production to tackle poverty. It also traced a Chinese-made energy-saving product – dryerballs – and showed how some people in the West were blaming China for its emissions created during the manufacture of goods for export. Harrabin popularised discussion of these "embedded" emissions, and showed that there were problems in all methodologies comparing international greenhouse gas emissions.

In September 2010, he presented Uncertain Climate, a highly praised two-part documentary on BBC Radio 4, which examined media depictions of climate change. He also reported for TV from a Chinese cave on how scientists are using stalagmites to decipher past monsoon patterns. Later that year he completed a documentary outlining the difficulties faced by organisers and delegates at the 2009 United Nations Climate Change Conference in Copenhagen. Harrabin was founder presenter of BBC Radio 4's environment magazine Costing the Earth, which was created to bring a lighter touch to environmental issues and to question environmental goals.

In 2015, Harrabin's report on renewable energy sources in Malawi, including a cook stove that charges mobile phones reportedly pulled in 22 million hits.

== Risk reporting and analysis ==
Harrabin's reporting is dominated by risk issues. He states that often major risk issues fail to fit news criteria of novelty, drama, conflict, personality and pictures. This leads the media, he believes, to have given the wrong level of prominence to a range of risks including MMR, dirty bombs, child abduction, transport safety, exotic diseases, UK National Health Service "crisis", the Brent Spar oil platform, nuclear power and genetic modification. He argues that the media should find new ways of exploring long-term risk issues such as preventive health and security of water, food, energy and climate.

== Public health risk ==
During a sabbatical at Green Templeton College, Oxford, he led a King's Fund paper "Health in The News", which researched the number of people needing to fall victim to a health problem for it to merit an item on national news. It showed that public health issues were massively under-reported compared with their impact on people's lives. Colleagues subsequently credited him with devising "Harrabin's Law" on disproportionate media coverage:

When considering societal problems over the long term, news-worthiness is often in inverse proportion to frequency. If problems become commonplace, they are not new - so do not qualify as 'news'

— Roger Harrabin

On returning to the BBC he led pan-BBC reporting on a public survey that suggested that people in the UK were much more ready to accept tougher measures on smoking, drinking and obesity than previously believed. Public health has since risen up the agenda in the UK for government and media.

== Transport risk ==
Harrabin's investigations into transport safety expenditure on Today provoked a shift in the UK national debate. He questioned media demands for increased rail safety investment because trains were already statistically much safer than roads, which were starved of funds. After his Panorama examined the UK's poor record in child road safety the then Prime Minister Tony Blair increased road safety targets for children.

== Risk advisory role ==
Harrabin co-wrote the BBC's guidance on reporting on risk with the head of BBC Politics, Sue Inglish. It calls for news instincts to be tempered by statistical perspective.

While on sabbatical at Wolfson College, Cambridge, Harrabin set up the Cambridge Media and Environment Programme (CMEP) with Dr Joe Smith, now of the Open University. They worked in partnership with other BBC staff organising seminars with a broad range of views to stimulate discussion of the BBC's coverage of global risk issues covering the environment, economics, and society.

After one seminar, the BBC concluded that as all major governments had apparently accepted the risk of climate change, arguments about the science of climate change should play a smaller part in the media than previously, while still being aired from time to time.
