= Alison Dougall =

- Occupation: Academic
- Website: https://www.tcd.ie/dental/people/dougala/

Alison Dougall (née Pughe, born 27 May 1964) is Associate Professor and Director of the Special Care Dentistry doctorate programme at Trinity College Dublin, Head of Department of Child and Dental Public Health at Trinity College Dublin and Consultant for medically complex patients at Dublin Dental Hospital.

== Biography ==
Dougall was born and brought up in Coventry. She is the eldest daughter of June Pughe FBBO, the Founder and Principal of the Allesley School of Dance in Coventry. Dougall was one of the first 30 girls to attend King Henry VIII School. In 1978, Dougall competed in the inaugural BBC Young Musician of the Year competition.

Dougall was inaugurated as President of the International Association of Disability and Oral Health (iADH) at its general assembly meeting on 3 October 2020.
