= Paul Best (cricketer) =

English cricketer (born 1991)

Personal information
- Full name: Paul Merwood Best
- Born: 8 March 1991 (age 35); Nuneaton, Warwickshire, England
- Batting: Left-handed
- Bowling: Slow left-arm orthodox
- Role: All-rounder
- Relatives: Mark Best (brother)

Domestic team information
- Years: Team
- 2011–2013: Warwickshire (squad no. 34)
- 2011: Northamptonshire (loan)
- 2011–2012: Cambridge University
- 2011–2012: Cambridge MCCU
- FC debut: 2 April 2011 Cambridge MCCU v Essex
- LA debut: 15 May 2011 Warwickshire v Leicestershire

Career statistics
Competition	FC	LA	T20
Matches	11	13	4
Runs scored	428	57	–
Batting average	42.80	11.40	–
100s/50s	1/2	0/0	–
Top score	150	16*	–
Balls bowled	2,449	443	84
Wickets	32	11	4
Bowling average	45.15	42.09	22.50
5 wickets in innings	2	0	0
10 wickets in match	0	0	0
Best bowling	6/86	3/43	3/19
Catches/stumpings	5/–	3/–	2/–
- Source: CricketArchive, 21 April 2016

Paul Merwood Best (born 8 March 1991) is a former English cricketer. Best is a left-handed batsman who bowls slow left-arm orthodox who played for Warwickshire County Cricket Club. He was born at Nuneaton, Warwickshire and educated at Bablake School, Coventry.

== Domestic career ==
While studying Anglo-Saxon, Norse and Celtic at the University of Cambridge, Best made his first-class debut for Cambridge MCCU against Essex in 2011, with Best scoring an unbeaten 50 in the MCCU's first-innings. A further first-class appearance followed for Cambridge MCCU against Middlesex, with him taking his maiden five wicket haul with figures of 6/101 in Middlesex's first-innings. Following this he made his debut for Warwickshire in the County Championship against Durham at the Riverside Ground. His final first-class appearance that season for Cambridge MCCU followed in May against Surrey, with Best scoring his maiden century with a score of 150 from 181 balls while batting at number eight. He appeared in The University Match for Cambridge University Cricket Club against Oxford University Cricket Club at Lord's Cricket Ground in July, taking his second five wicket haul with figures of 6/86 in Oxford University's second-innings.

Prior to this, Best had made his List A debut for Warwickshire in May against Leicestershire in the Clydesdale Bank 40. He made a second appearance in that competition for Warwickshire against Durham. In July 2011, Best joined Northamptonshire on loan for the remainder of that season. He made a single County Championship appearance against Glamorgan, as well as four List A appearances in the Clydesdale Bank 40.

Best retired from professional cricket prior to the 2015 season having suffered with stress fractures of the back over the previous two years.

== International career ==
Prior to playing first-class cricket, Best played for England Under-19s, making his debut against Bangladesh Under-19s during their tour of Bangladesh. Best captained the team during this tour. He later played for the team in the 2010 Under-19 World Cup in New Zealand, though the team was captained on this occasion by Azeem Rafiq. Best captained England Under-19s against Sri Lanka Under-19s during the 2010 season in one Test, five Youth One Day Internationals and two Youth Twenty20 International matches. He was named 'Man of the Series' in the One Day games. In total, Best made two Youth Test, twelve Youth One Day International and two Youth Twenty20 International appearances.
