= Billie Love =

British actress and photographer

Constance Billie Stone (18 October 1923 – 13 January 2012), known professionally as Billie Love, was a British actress and photographer.

== Early life ==
Love's father, Mark Stone (whose stage name was Joe Murgatroyd), and his wife, Josie (née Bradley), performed a comedy double-act, appearing on Radio Normandy and BBC Home Service.

== Career ==
Billie Love had a natural talent for photography and portraiture and was first discovered by Fred Daniels at a sitting for Tatler in 1950. Initially Billie Love took up acting roles in the West End. Their second introduction was in 1954 during a portrait session to promote her role as Ado Annie in Oklahoma!, which was playing at the Stoll Theatre in Holborn. One of these portraits is now in the photographic collection at the National Portrait Gallery recognised for its collection of eminent figures in public life. Billie Love showed Daniels some of the photographs she had taken backstage, and he encouraged her to pursue a career in photography.

Soon after their meeting, she abandoned her stage career and took up photography professionally using a Graflex camera. In 1956, Love shared a studio with Fred Daniels at number 17 Coventry Street. Soon after, she created a professional name for herself, working under the name of Amanda as a signature of her work. This was a common trademark for leading female photographers at the time. For next three years Daniels helped to develop her craft and she became the main follower of his style of portraiture. One of her first prominent clients was actor Ian Carmichael and she took a series of colour portraits that reveal a direct but intimate style.

Later in 1959, Love set up Amanda Studio at 20 Orchard Street and specialised in portraits of performers and artists. In 1968, she moved to the Albany Studio close to Regent's Park. By this time, her clients included Dinah Sheridan and she helped to support herself with the occasional small role in British films, including Leo the Last (1970), directed by John Boorman. Several of her photographs and poems appeared in The Lady between 1973 and 1989.

In 1989, she moved to the Isle of Wight and began the third part of a career as a collector of rare photographs specialising in late Victorian and Edwardian life, and with her partner Anna Shepherd she created the Billie Love Historical Collection and published several books including How to Become A Child, published by The Billie Love Historical Collection (1996; ISBN 0951841017). In 2008, she was featured with Shepherd on BBC South.

== Death ==
Billie Love died on 13 January 2012 at the age of 88.
