= Melissa Kite =

British journalist (born 1972)

Melissa Louise Kite (born 1972) is a British journalist, contributing editor and current columnist for The Spectator. She previously wrote a satirical politics column for the newspaper under the name "Tamzin Lightwater". She has also written articles for several other newspapers, and was deputy political editor of The Sunday Telegraph until March 2011. She appeared as a panelist on 22 March 2012 edition of the BBC television programme Question Time which was broadcast from the coastal town of Grimsby in North East Lincolnshire.

== Bibliography ==
- Kite, Melissa (2012). Real Life: One Woman's Guide to Love, Men and Other Everyday Disasters. London: Constable & Robinson.
- Kite, Melissa (2015). The Art of Not Having it All. London: St. Martin's Press.
