= Michael Tooby =

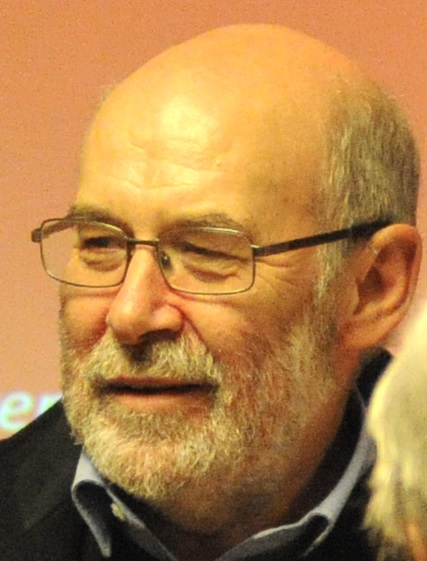
- Alma mater: King Henry VIII School, Coventry
- Occupation: Curator, academic staff
- Website: www.bathspa.ac.uk/our-people/michael-tooby/

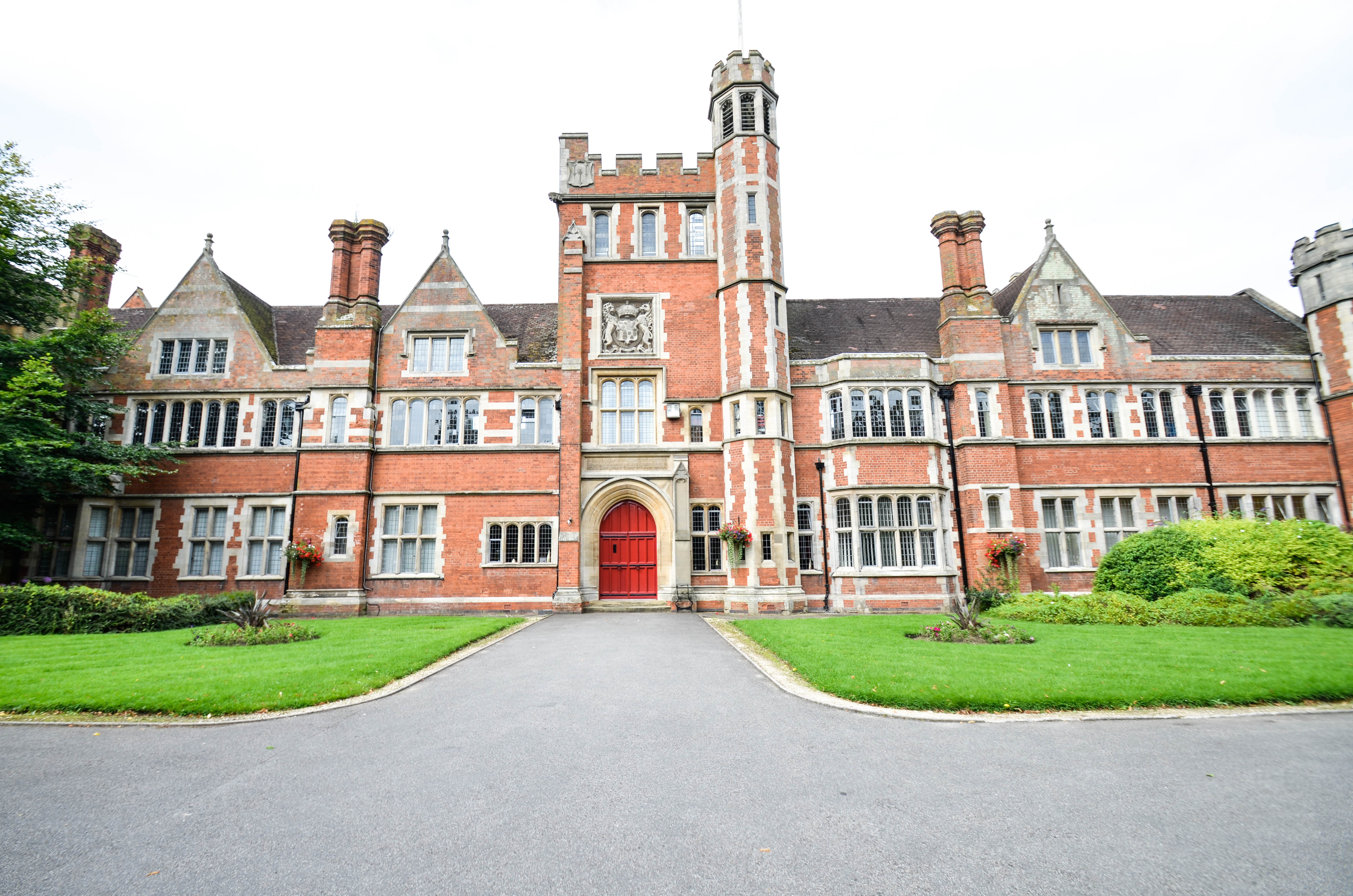

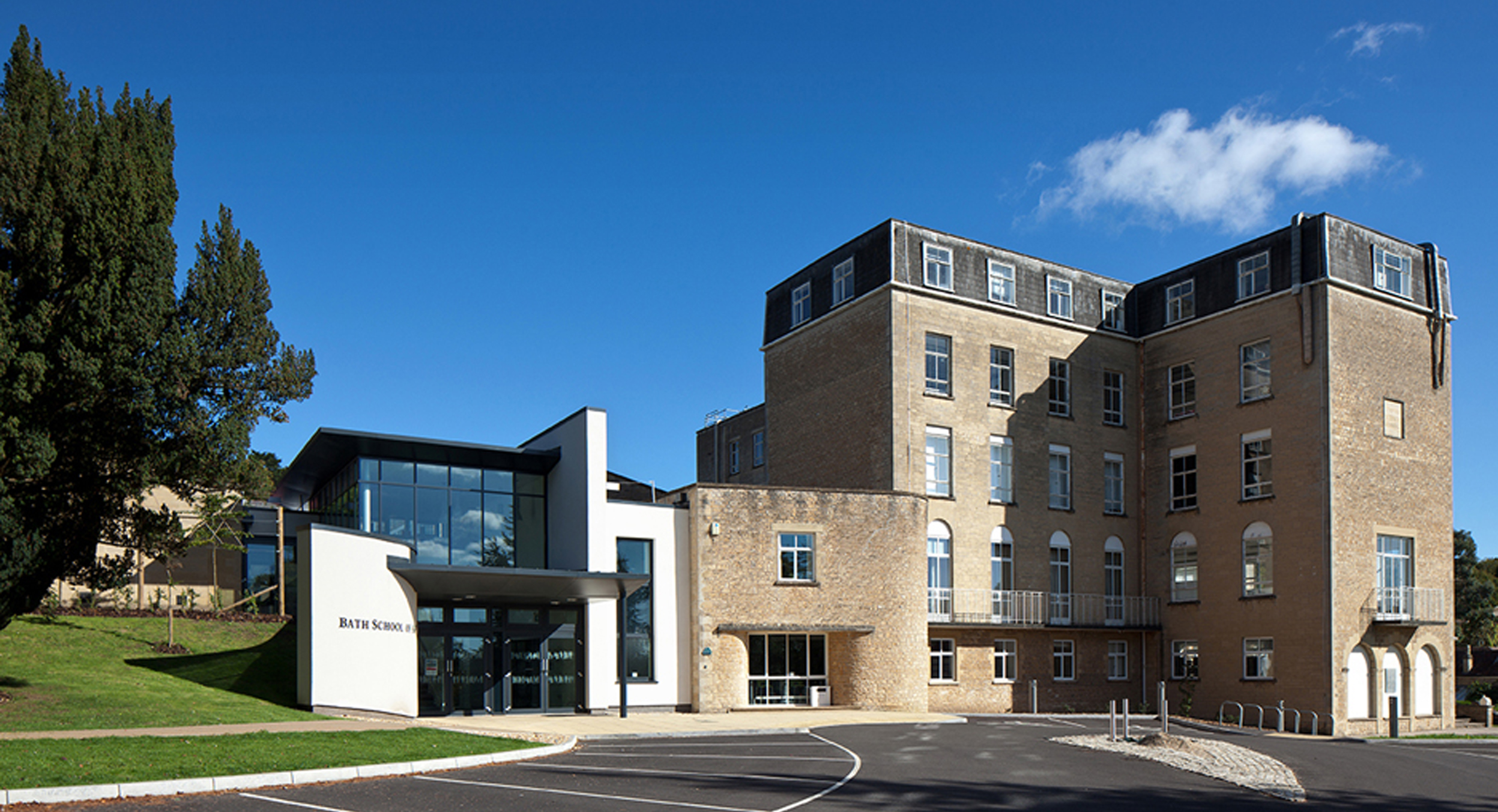

Mike Tooby (born 20 December 1956) is an independent curator and researcher based in Cardiff, Wales. His interests lie in integrating the practices often separated in curating in the arts and heritage settings: research, display, promotion, participation and learning. His own practice centres on curating in collaborative or site-specific contexts, where negotiating and celebrating relationships with audiences are at the core of projects.

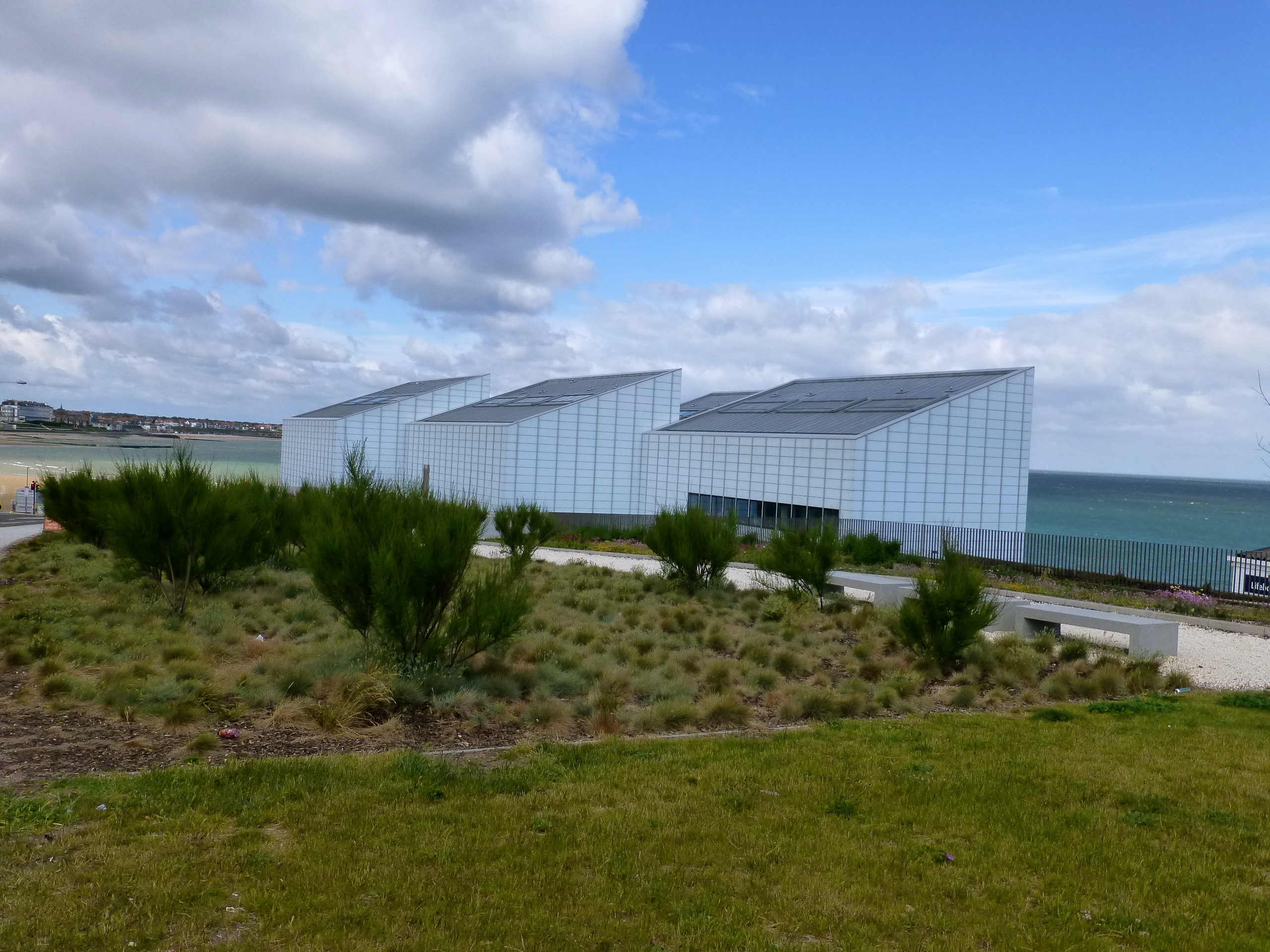

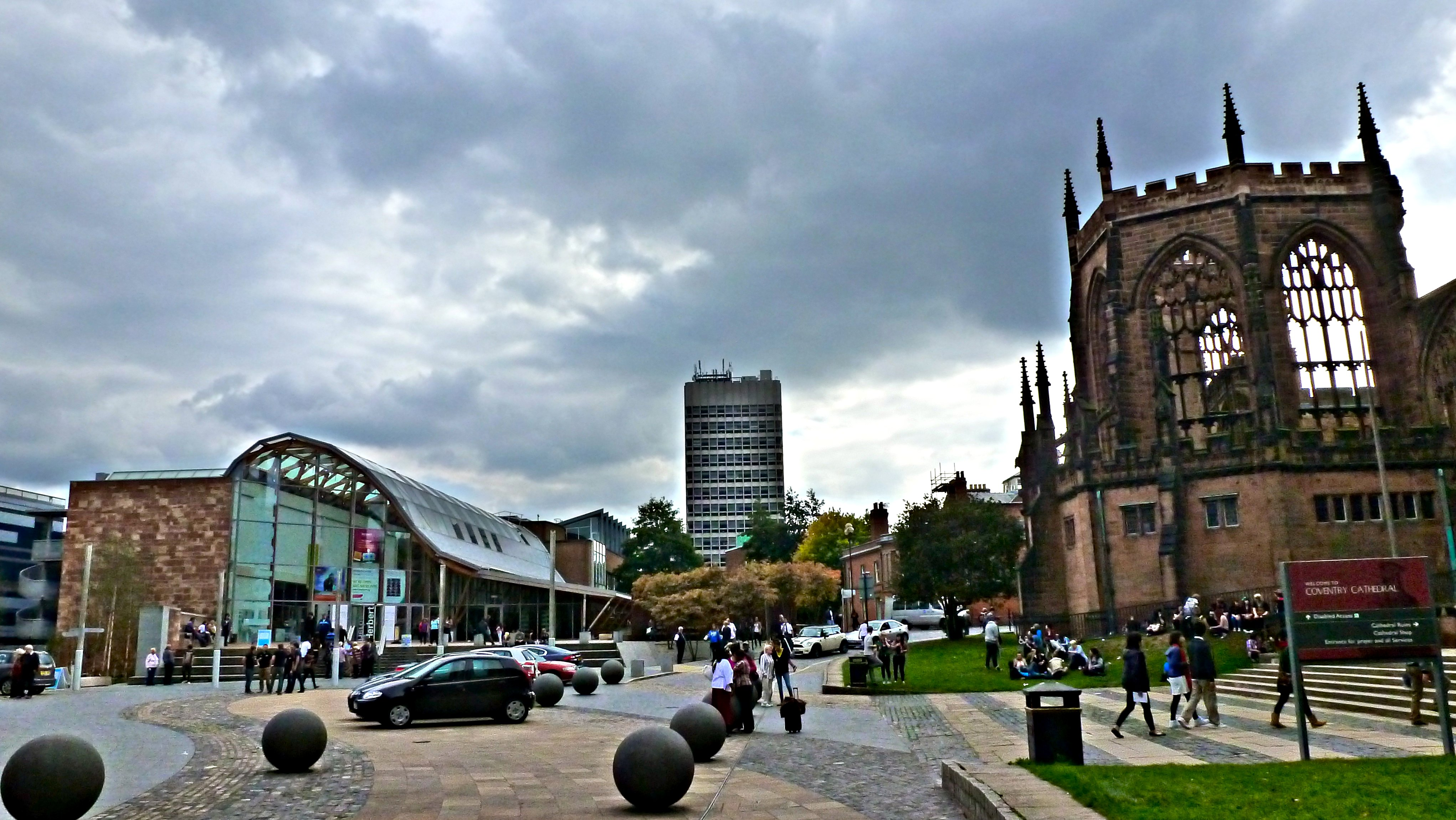

== Journeys with 'The Waste Land' (2018) ==
Tooby's commitment to participation and social engagement is exemplified by his role in, Journeys with 'The Waste Land', a major exhibition exploring the significance of T.S. Eliot’s poem 'The Waste Land' through the visual arts. Tooby described himself as the "initiating curator" of this project, elsewhere he is described as its "architect". Journeys with 'The Waste Land' was exhibited first at the Turner Contemporary in Margate and then at the Herbert Art Gallery & Museum in Coventry. Information about the project (including its timeline, methodology, downloads, videos of its research group in action and visitor data) is available on the Turner Contemporary Website.

Tooby gave the 2018 Ursula Hoff Lecture in curating at the University of Melbourne. In this lecture, Tooby explored how testimony has played a key role in his recent curatorial projects. His starting point was the use of William Blake's Illustrations to Dante in Journeys with 'The Waste Land', which was created by the collective sharing of different life experiences and expertise by over 100 participants in its curating. He will show how this process was informed by his previous interest in testimony when co-curating faith-based and minority cultural projects in Wales, such as The Muslim World on Your Doorstep and Hineni: belonging and identity in a Jewish community.

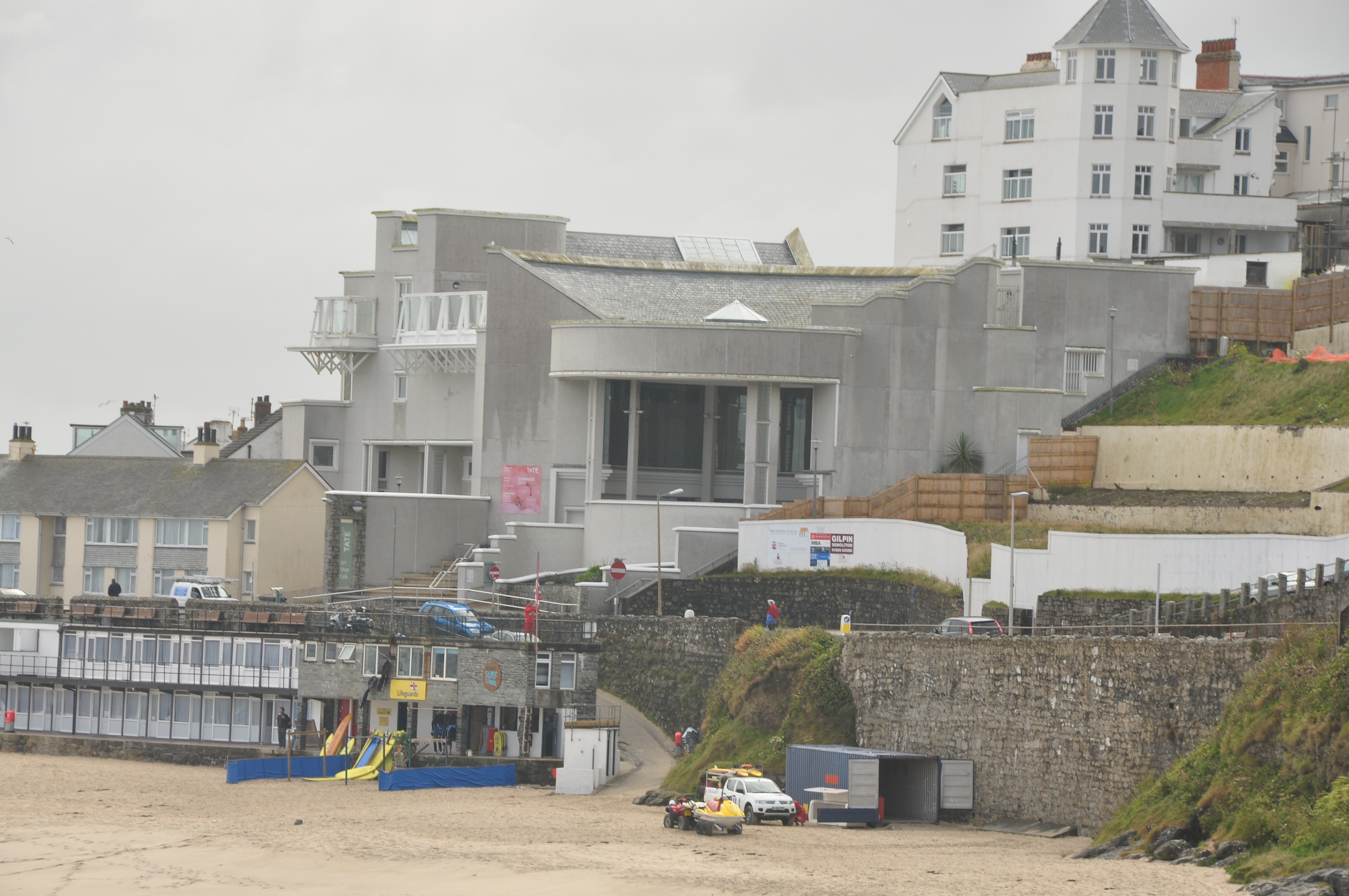

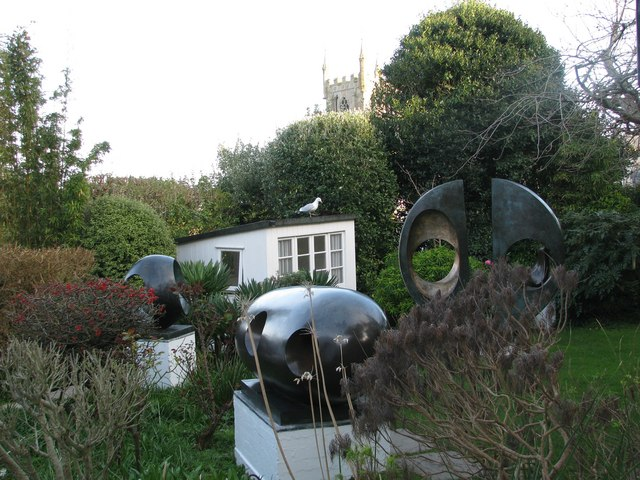

== Professional career ==
Since 2012, Tooby has been Professor of Art & Design at the Bath School of Art & Design at Bath Spa University. His teaching specialisms are: History of Art & Design; Museology; Contemporary Curatorial Practice.

Previously, Tooby was: curator (1992 to 1999) at Tate St Ives and curator of the Barbara Hepworth Museum and Sculpture Garden (1992–1999); Director, National Museum & Gallery (2000 to 2004) and Director of Learning, Programmes and Development (2004 to 2011) for Amgueddfa Cymru – National Museum Wales;

Other recent academic appointments include: Senior Research Fellow (2014–15) at the Henry Moore Institute; Steering Group Member (2015–18) for the Arts and Humanities Research Council funded research project led by Sonia Boyce, "Black Art and Modernism", at the University of the Arts London; Academic Advisor to the Academy of Visual Arts (2015–18), Hong Kong Baptist University; International Visiting Scholar (2018) in the Art History and Curating programme, Australian National University.

== Early life ==
Tooby grew up in Coventry and was educated at King Henry VIII School, Coventry (1967 to 1974) before studying for a Master of Arts (MA) in Art History, Archaeology and Anthropology at Magdalene College, Cambridge (1975–78)

== Bibliography ==
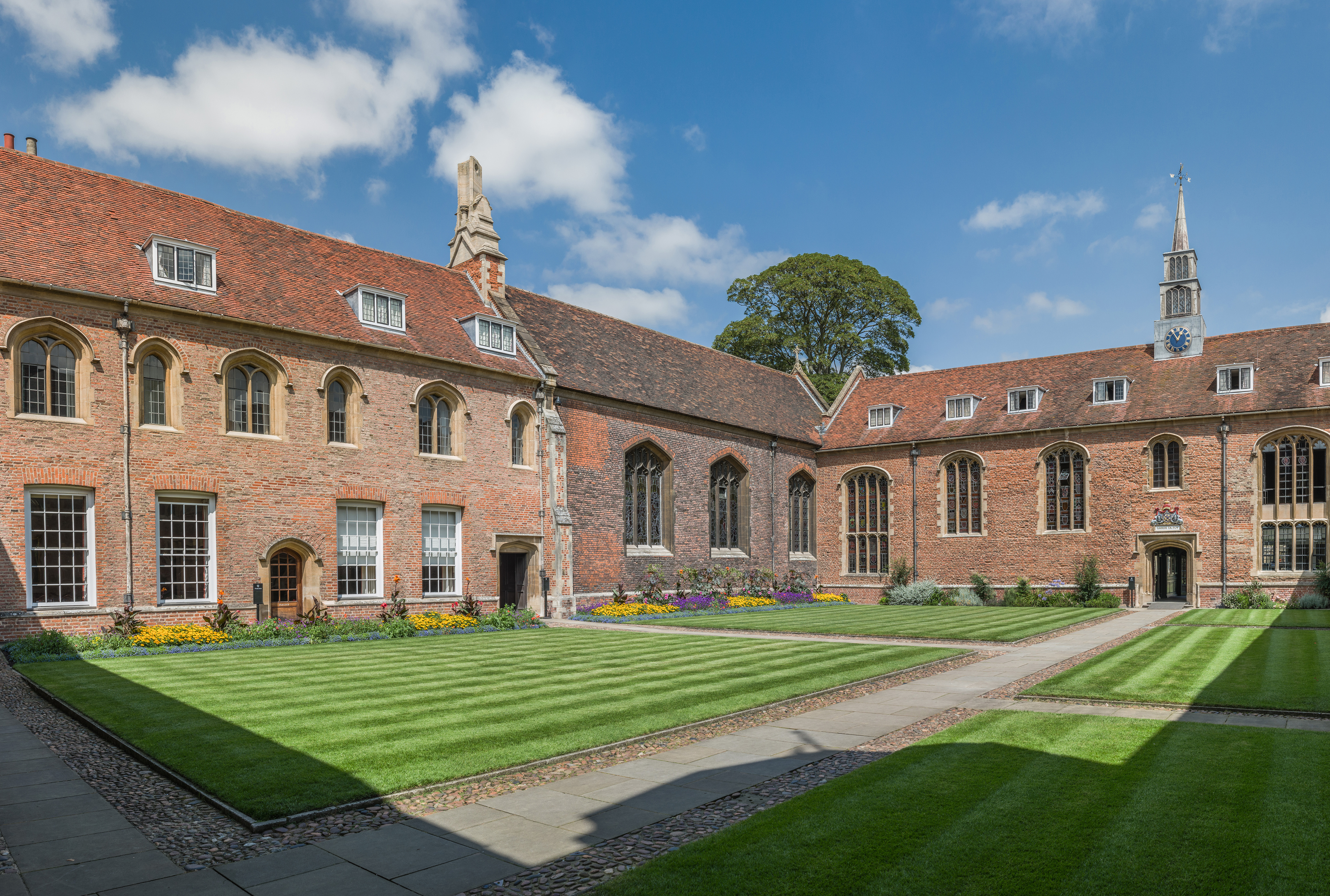

Full details of Tooby's "research and academic outputs" can be found on ResearchSPAce

=== Books ===
- Tooby, M, ed. (2018) wavespeech: Edmund de Waal and David Ward - a collaborative work in context
- Tooby, M and Shalgosky, S, eds. (2015) Imagining a university: fifty years of the University of Warwick Art collection
- Stair, J and Tooby, M (2014) Julian Stair: Quietus reviewed. Archaeology of an exhibition
- Tooby, M (2012) Engaging young people in the arts in Norway and Wales.
- Tooby, M (2005) Trevor Bell: Heatscape, the Florida six, Still: the new paintings
- Tooby, M and Feary, J (1999) Colour in space: Patrick Heron: public projects
- Tooby, M and de Waal, E (1999) Modern home: an intervention by Edmund de Waal at High Cross House
- Tooby, M, Daniel, S and Barlow, M (1995) From the interior: selected sculptures 1981-1995
- Tooby, M and Shalev, D (1995) Tate Gallery St Ives: the building
- Tooby, M (1993) Tate Gallery St. Ives, Barbara Hepworth Museum and Sculpture Garden: an illustrated companion
- Tooby, M (1987) 'In Perpetuity and Without Charge': Mappin Art Gallery 1887–1987

=== Chapters ===
- 2020: '"Who me?": the individual experience in participative and collaborative projects.', O'Neill, M and Hooper, G, eds. Connecting Museums
- 2017: 'When forms become attitude: a consideration of the adoption by an artist of ceramic display as narrative device and symbolic landscape.', Petrie, K and Livingstone, A, eds. The Ceramics Reader
- 2015: 'Veronica Ryan.', Making It: Sculpture in Britain 1977–1986
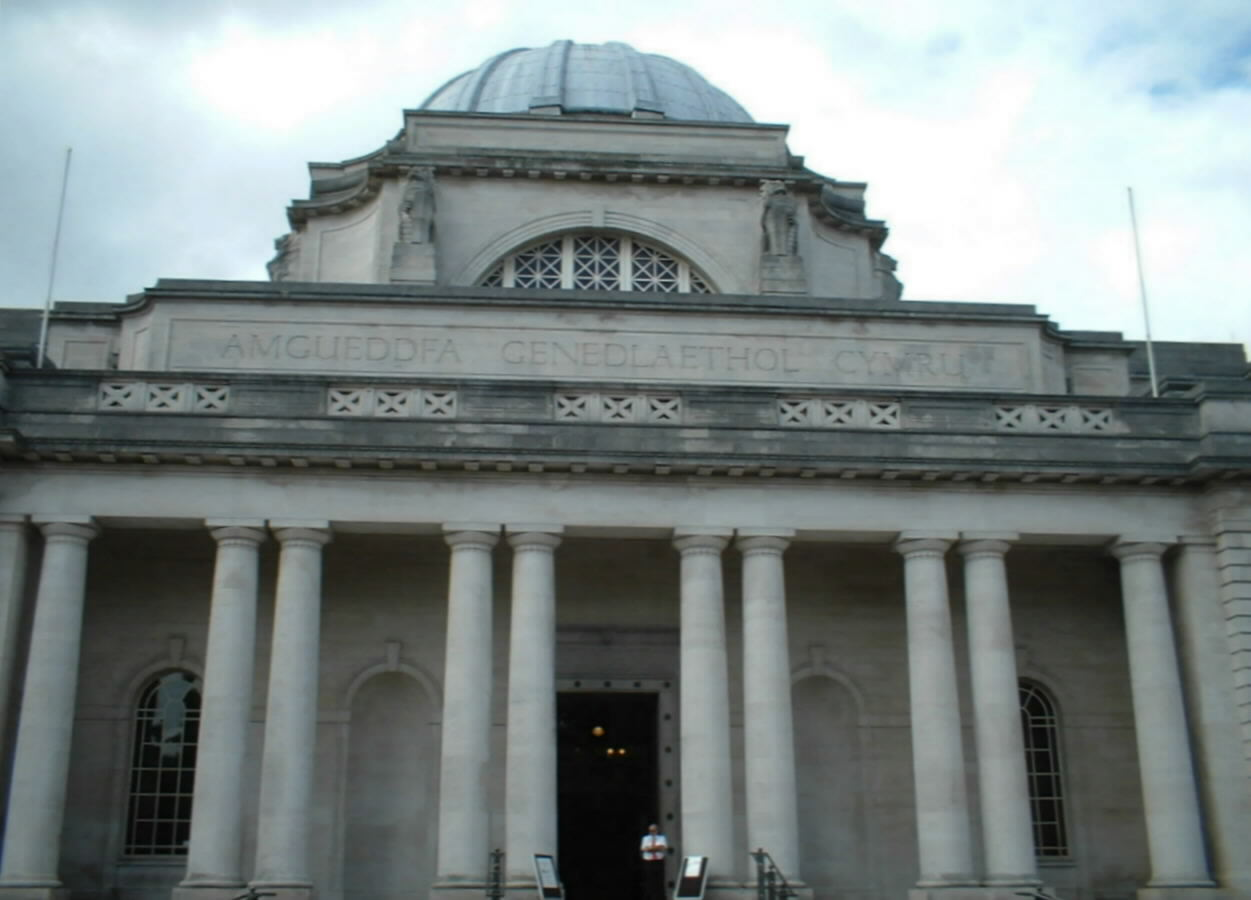
- 2015: 'Do not call it fixity.', James Hugonin: binary rhythm: paintings 2010-2015
- 2014: 'Many-roomed mansion to theatre of memories: thoughts on artists and museums.', Nicol, G, ed. Inspired by: your guide to art and the museum
- 2013: 'Simplicity and subject.', William Scott: simplicity and subject
- 2012: 'Look closely.', Kurt Jackson: A New Genre of Landscape Painting
- 2010: 'Rachel Nicholson: critical view.', Wilkinson, A, ed. Rachel Nicholson
- 2008: 'The master printer.', Hughes, S, Clark, M and Fitch, A, eds. Hugh Stoneman: master printer
- 2007: 'St Ives - is it worth saving?', The St Ives School 1997-2007
- 2006: 'Where does the museum end?', Lang, C, Reeve, J and Woollard, V, eds. The responsive museum: working with audiences in the twenty-first century
- 2003: 'Trevor Bell.', Trevor Bell: a British painter in America
- 2001: 'Towards a study of Terry Setch.', Tooby, M and Holman, M, eds. Terry Setch: a retrospective
- 2000: 'Iwan Bala.', Offerings and reinventions
- 2000: 'Light the blue touch paper.', Gage, J and Tooby, M, eds. Blue: borrowed and new
- 2000: 'A working environment.', David Nash: chwarel goed, wood quarry
- 1998: 'The same subject: sources and origins.', Glennie, S, ed. William Scott: paintings and drawings
- 1998: 'Peter Randall-Page.', Whistling in the dark: Peter Randall-Page, drawings and prints 1983-98

=== Journal articles ===
- with Scott, T (2016: 'A journey with 'The waste land'.' Arts & Education (8)
- 2014: 'Interpreting and learning.' Engage (35)
- 2012: 'When forms become attitude: a consideration of the adoption by an artist of ceramic display as narrative device and symbolic landscape'. Behind the Scenes at the Museum: Ceramics in the Expanded Field
- 2012: 'Order and disorder: Some relationships between ceramics, sculpture and museum taxonomies.' Interpreting Ceramics (14)
- 2011: 'Home and away: collections abroad.' Engage (28)
- 2010: 'Edmund de Waal: the hare with amber eyes' Interpreting Ceramics (12)
- 2009: 'More than skin deep: the new Art Gallery of Ontario.' Museum Practice (45)
- 2006: 'St Ives and Cardiff: two experiences of cultural tourism.' Nexus (35)

=== Conferences, Lectures and Workshops ===
- 2019: Julian Stair: Tea and sensation. Summer 2019, co-facilitator, Compton Verney Art Gallery & Park
- 2018: Modernism, image and text: reflections on T.S.Eliot and visualisation of 'The waste land'. 29 October 2018, Australian National University, Canberra, Australia.
- 2018: 'I can connect': the power of curating to share experiences. 18 October 2018, The Ursula Hoff Lecture 2018, University of Melbourne, Australia
- 2018: Trevor Bell: his time as Gregory Fellow and its position in the trajectory of the Gregory Fellowships. 14–15 June 2018, University of Leeds, UK.
- 2015: Tooby, M, Smith, R and O’ Keeffe, D A journey with T. S. Eliot's 'The Waste Land' 8 October 2015, Ilkley Literature Festival, Ilkley Playhouse, Ilkley, UK.
- 2015: Another side of Stanley Royle. 29 April 2015, Lunchtime Talk Series, Graves Art Gallery, Sheffield, UK.

=== Exhibitions ===
- 2018: Journeys with 'The Waste Land' [curator]. Turner Contemporary, Margate, UK, 3 February - 7 May 2018.
- 2015: wavespeech [curator]. The Pier Arts Centre, Stromness, Scotland, 20 June - 12 September 2015.
- 2014: Storio - store. Settlement, Spit and Sawdust Skatepark, Cafe and Artspace, Roath, Cardiff, 17 October 2014.
- 2013: At the mad shepherdess. Diffusion: Cardiff International Festival of Photography., Chapter, Cardiff, 12–19 May 2013.
- 2013: William Scott: Simplicity and Subject. Victoria Art Gallery, Bath, UK, 7 September - 17 November 2013.
- 2012: The Museum of Amazing Coincidences. Made in Roath, Cardiff, UK, October 2012.
- 2011: Kelvin Road mantelpiece. Made in Roath, Cardiff, 2011.
- 2008: National Museum and Gallery, Cardiff: complete redisplay of art galleries, representation of natural history gallery and learning spaces. National Museum Wales, Cardiff, UK, 2008.
- 1997: A Quality Of Light: A Collaborative Visual Arts Event. Tate Gallery St Ives, May - July 1997
