= Fred Daniels =

English photographer (1892–1959)

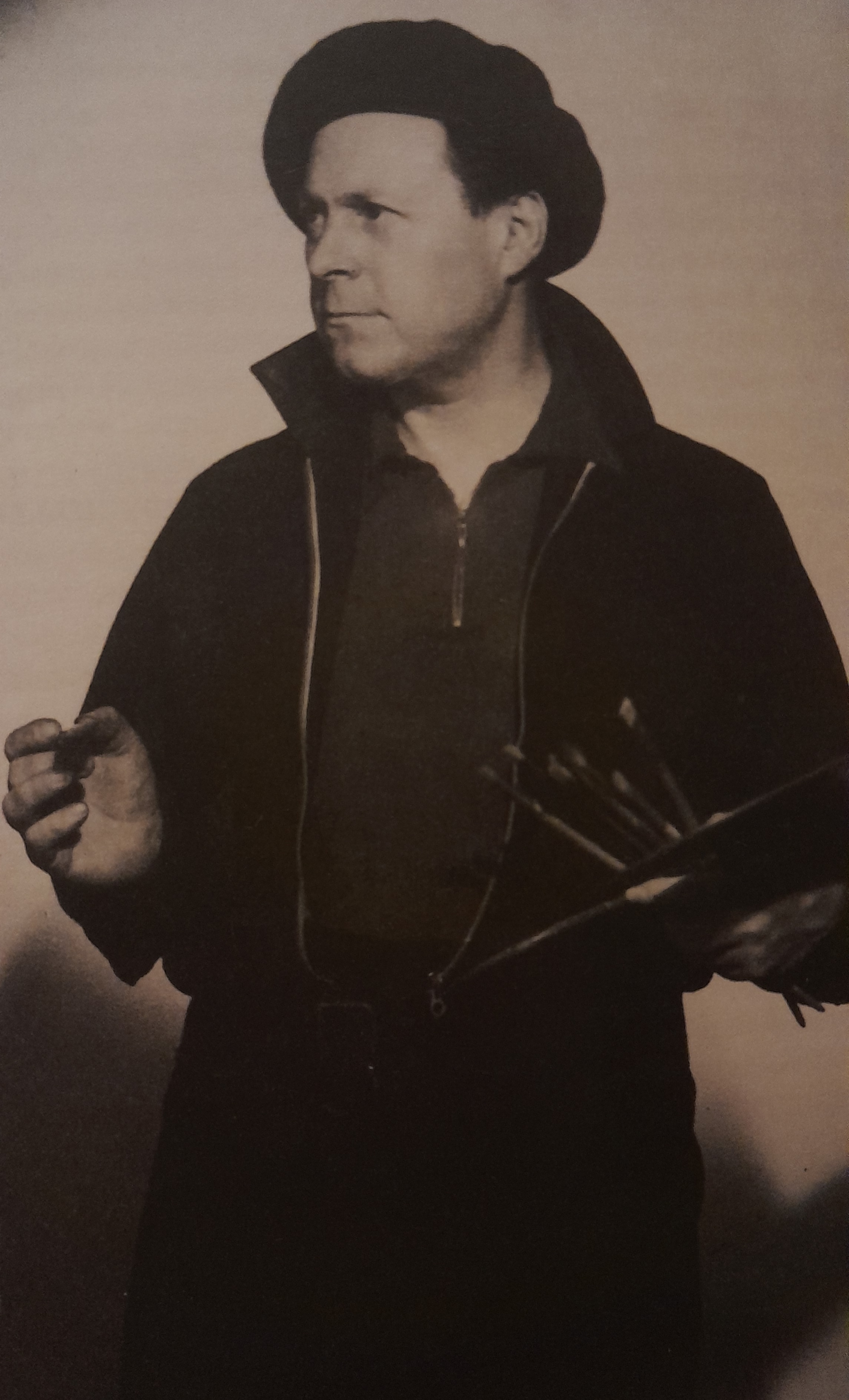
- Fred Daniels in 1945
- Born: George Frederick William Daniels; 26 July 1892; Churchover, Warwickshire, England
- Died: February 28, 1959 (aged 66)
- Occupation: Photographer

Fred Daniels (26 July 1892 – 28 February 1959) was an artist and pioneer of film still photography in the British film industry including work with Powell and Pressburger. This was achieved by creating studio portraits of the actors. After a careful rehearsal process which involved making sketches, two or three camera portraits were produced and delivered to the client. A final print was then developed in a larger format. In an effort to avoid mass production and retain creative freedom Daniels maintained copyright of his work. Working on commissions from film, theatre, music and ballet Daniels became a specialist photographer creating portrait photographs from his small studio. Fine art prints were produced and signed Fred Daniels although these are extremely rare. Portraits of Audrey Hepburn and Vivien Leigh are amongst his best known work.

== Biography ==
Born George Frederick William Daniels in Churchover, Warwickshire, he pioneered innovative techniques and experiments with light that created a more sophisticated still image. Daniels was educated at Bablake School in Coventry. In 1925 he started his career as a freelance photographer in the South of France and photographed dancer and choreographer Margaret Morris. The Antibes summer schools attracted artists from the performing arts, and for Daniels it was an opportunity to capture the grace and elegance of the human form. His camera studies were also published in The Sketch and Tatler magazines.

Daniels entered the film industry in 1929 when he was discovered by director E. A. Dupont and was hired as the stills photographer for Anna May Wong at Elstree Studios to promote Piccadilly. The film was a success, and in the same year Daniels was assigned to the Titanic disaster film Atlantic starring John Longden and Madeleine Carroll. In 1932 he photographed Brigitte Helm during the filming of The Blue Danube directed by Herbert Wilcox. Daniels was admired by producer H.B. Warner for his stills and was offered a contract in Hollywood. During the 1930s his career developed with the British and Dominions Film Company, and he became their star photographer, taking portraits of actors such as Anna Neagle.

At the start of World War II his photographic skills were in demand including a collaboration with film director Thorold Dickinson and he was assigned as the Stills Photographer on The Arsenal Stadium Mystery. In 1940 Daniels set up his own portrait studio in Coventry Street as a specialist portrait photographer. The film industry tended to be integrated and outside specialists were discouraged. The studios achieved control by relying on staff stills photographers under contract to the studio and encouraged membership of the film union ACTT to avoid freelance photographers to manoeuvre into the industry. However, with the support of the Independent Producers Michael Powell and Emeric Pressburger Daniels managed to progress on his own terms. From his small studio close to the London Trocadero he took portraits of Leslie Howard and Laurence Olivier to promote the film 49th Parallel. Coventry Street was a popular West End destination with nightclubs, bars and restaurants although it was badly damaged on 8 March 1941 during the Blitz with heavy casualties and several properties including Cafe de Paris were put out of action. Trade was suspended for a while. However, in 1942 the Empire Studio re opened and Daniels resumed his work with Powell and Pressburer and their newly formed production company known as The Archers became one of his clients. Daniels created studio portraits of Robert Helpmann, Pamela Brown and Googie Withers for One of Our Aircraft Is Missing. In 1943 Powell and Pressburger commissioned Daniels to photograph Ralph Richardson for their film about The Fleet Air Arm titled The Volunteer. This was followed by a full stills assignment at Pinewood Studios and over two hundred production stills were taken during Life and Death of Colonel Blimp. The actors Roger Livesey and Deborah Kerr were additionally photographed at his portrait studio. In 1944 Sheila Sim and Eric Portman were photographed during A Canterbury Tale, and Wendy Hiller during I Know Where I'm Going!. In 1945 Kim Hunter, and David Niven were sitters during the filming of A Matter of Life and Death In 1946 Sabu, Jean Simmons and Deborah Kerr were photographed during the filming of Black Narcissus at Pinewood Studios. The actors were paired together, either seated or standing together to suggest intimacy and to create an ambiguity about their characters. This assignment is significant in the sense that the photographer was interpreting the transgressive elements of the film for a modern audience. In 1949 he worked on Gone to Earth and sitters included Jennifer Jones, Cyril Cusack and David Farrar and the assignment was featured in Picture Post Magazine. During the same year Daniels photographed David Niven for The Elusive Pimpernel although it was not hugely popular at the box office. In 1955 Powell and Pressburger hired Daniels to promote Battle of the River Plate. His association with Powell and Pressburger was the most creative period of his career and he became a trusted member of their team. Daniels was also recruited by Michael Powell Theatre Productions between 1944 and 1949 including publicity photographs for Hemingway's The Fifth Column performed in Glasgow by Roger Livesey and Margaret Johnston.

As well as the Empire Studio in central London, Daniels simultaneously worked from a small studio he created at his home known as the White House near Elstree. This enabled him to experiment with colour photography, although only a few colour images remain of the garden and grounds of the Frank Lloyd Wright inspired house. In a feature titled "The Art of Fred Daniels" in the October 1941 edition of The Queen, Daniels mocks himself and casually imitates the tennis player Fred Perry at home with his wife enjoying a life of leisure. The villa also caught the attention of art historian Nikolaus Pevsner. Despite his obvious talent both as a photographer and designer of The White House it is difficult to establish the full extent of his career due to a fire that destroyed most of his archive. Later work includes portraits of ballet dancer Mona Inglesby, work for society magazines and the occasional commissions from actors including James Mason and Glynis Johns. Another source of income was teaching wealthy patrons the art of lighting and photography. One of his most prominent pupils was Billie Love but this relationship soured when Billie Love started producing counterfeit prints of his work in the darkroom. In 1959 his health deteriorated and he died suddenly of a heart attack. A permanent collection of his work is held by the National Portrait Gallery in London, The Museum and Gallery Perth and by the BFI National Archive.

== Sources ==
- Fred Daniels. Powell and Pressburger Portraits. Published by Twarda Sztuka Foundation 2012. ISBN 978-83-930435-2-1
- Archive material held at the Heinz Library, National Portrait Gallery.
- Fred Daniels [early biographical details and authenticated photographs]
- BFI National Archive/ Collections www.bfi.org.uk
