= Jex-Blake =

Jex-Blake is a surname. Notable people with the surname include:

- Arthur John Jex-Blake (1873–1957), British physician
- Henrietta Jex-Blake (1862–1953), British violinist
- Katharine Jex-Blake (1860–1951), British classicist
- Sophia Jex-Blake (1840–1912), British physician, teacher and feminist
- Thomas Jex-Blake (1832–1915), British Anglican priest and educationalist

== See also ==
- Jex
- Blake (surname)
