= Kathleen Butler =

Kathleen Butler may refer to:

- Kathleen Butler (screenwriter), British screenwriter
- Kathleen M. Butler (1891–1972), Australian project manager and "Godmother of Sydney Harbour Bridge"
- Kathleen Butler (linguist) (1883–1950), British linguist
- Kathleen Butler-Hopkins, American violinist
