= Frances Bernard =

Educator, mistress of Girton College (1839–1926)

(Marianne) Frances Bernard (12 February 1839, in Bristol – 9 April 1926, in Bristol) was Mistress of Girton College, Cambridge from 1875 until 1884.

== Early life ==
She was born in Bristol, the second daughter of the surgeon James Fogo Bernard and his wife Marianne Amelia Lawrence, sister of John Lawrence, 1st Baron Lawrence; Charles Bernard was an elder brother. She spent time in British India during the 1860s, when her uncle was Viceroy, in the households of her brother and uncle.

Bernard was trained at the Home and Colonial Training College, as an elementary school teacher.

== Mistress of Girton College ==
Frances Bernard was chosen as Mistress of Girton in 1875, after the position had been advertised; she paid a visit to Barbara Bodichon in April, and had the backing of Henrietta Stanley, Baroness Stanley of Alderley, leading to her appointment in June. Emily Davies, whom Bernard succeeded, compared her to Charlotte Manning, the first head of the college when it was set up in Hitchin. Bernard relied heavily on Davies during a prolonged handover, for day-to-day matters.

Bernard's appointment as Mistress was not universally welcomed. Louisa Lumsden, on the Girton staff in 1874 but forced to leave after clash with Davies in 1875, and Constance Maynard, who finished as Girton student in 1875, had problems with the continuing role of Davies. They looked to Bodichon to hold the ring. Lumsden, indeed, had been a candidate favoured by Girton alumnae, and those existing students who had resented the absentee authority of Davies took Bernard to be a shill. Some felt her connection with Lawrence had swayed the decision.

During her tenure, Bernard guided the college through ongoing construction of the college facilities and an outbreak of smallpox in 1878. She brought back the alumna Elizabeth Welsh in 1876 as classical tutor; and saw two students, Constance Jones and Charlotte Scott, attain high marks in the 1880 Tripos.

== Later life ==
In 1884 Bernard left Girton College to marry Peter Wallwork Latham, Downing professor of medicine at Cambridge. She held a position on the college executive committee until 1924.
