= Oldershaw School =

The Oldershaw School
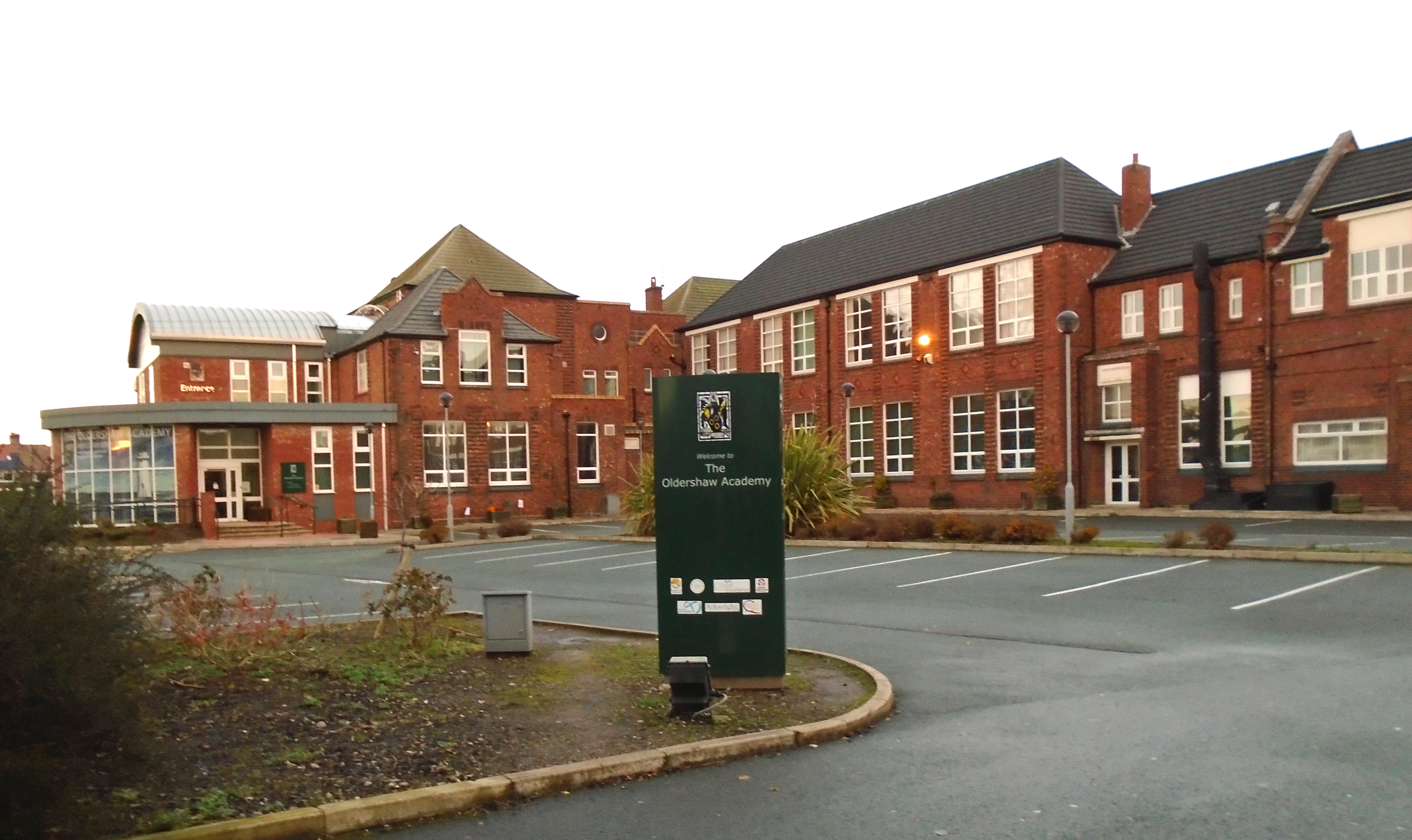

Location
- Valkyrie Road; Liscard, Wallasey, Wirral, CH45 4RJ; England; 53.422591°N 3.049146°W

Information
- Type: Academy
- Motto: Certanti Dabitur
- Established: 1920
- Founder: John Oldershaw CBE, MD, JP
- Local authority: Wirral
- Specialist: Business & Enterprise
- Department for Education URN: 136895 Tables
- Ofsted: Reports
- Principals: Steve Fisher
- Gender: Co-educational
- Age: 11 to 18
- Enrolment: 825 As of 2025
- Capacity: 1111 As of 2025
- Former name: Oldershaw Grammar School
- Website: www.oldershaw.wirral.sch.uk

The Oldershaw School, formerly Oldershaw High School, is a secondary school located in the Liscard area of Wallasey, England, and is a specialist Business and Enterprise College.

== History ==
=== Grammar School ===
John Oldershaw, M.D., J.P., Mayor of Wallasey founded the school in 1920, and it opened on 11 September 1920. Extensions to the school were opened on 4 June 1926. The first headteacher was Mr. H.G. Mayo, M.A. It was administered by the County Borough of Wallasey. By 1968 it had 700 pupils. Wallasey Grammar School was a separate establishment based on Withens Lane, which moved to Leasowe in 1967 and is now The Kingsway Academy (formerly The Wallasey School).

=== Comprehensive ===
Initially, having separate sections for boys and girls, with segregated teaching except for 'A' Level courses, Oldershaw became a comprehensive school in 1968, initially retaining the name of Oldershaw Grammar School although for ages 13–18.

The school then included four 'houses': Durham, York, Lancaster and Chester. Prior to this the houses of the boys' grammar school were defined as colours: Blue, Gold, Red and Green whilst the girls' high school houses were Oak, Fir, Beech and Elm.

Wirral Education Authority rationalised their middle school system in 1982, and added an extra year to primary schools (Now referred to as Year 6) and two years into secondary schools (Years 7 and 8). To accommodate these two extra years Oldershaw was expanded to include a Lower School (opening in September 1982), under K. R. M. Williams, at the site of the old St. Hilda's School in Ormond Street; it was later moved to the same site as the main school in time for the autumn term of 2000, and the Lower School site was demolished to make way for new housing.

The school has undergone major developments. The original sixth form building was demolished to make way for a new main entrance building.

=== The Oldershaw Academy ===
On 30 June 2011 The Oldershaw School became an academy.

== Notable past pupils ==
- M. C. Bradbrook, Professor of English from 1965 to 1976 of the University of Cambridge, and Mistress of Girton College, Cambridge from 1968 to 1976
- Dickie Davies, television presenter, World of Sport
- Air Vice-Marshal John Feesey AFC, Station Commander from 1986 to 1988 of RAF Wittering and Commander from 1989 to 1991 of the Allied Air Forces Central Europe (AAFCE)
- Kirstie Levell, English football goalkeeper who plays for Everton, and has also represented England at under-17, under-19 and under-23 levels.
- Harry Steere, flying ace of the Royal Air Force during the Second World War
- Charles Suckling CBE, chemist who first synthesised Halothane, the main general anaesthetic gas from 1956 until the 1980s, when working at the General Chemical Division of ICI in 1951
- Jodie Taylor, an English footballer who plays as a striker for OL Reign in the National Women's Soccer League, and has made many appearances for the national team.
- Sydney Wignall, British marine archaeologist, climber, explorer and spy
