= Ethics Since 1900 =

1960 book by Mary Warnock, Baroness Warnock

- Authors: Mary Warnock, Baroness Warnock
- Language: English
- Subject: History of ethics
- Publisher: Oxford University Press
- Publication date: 1960
- Publication place: United Kingdom
- Media type: Print
- Pages: 212
- ISBN: 0-9753662-2-X

Ethics Since 1900 is a 1960 book by the philosopher Mary Warnock, Baroness Warnock, in which the author provides an account of the history of ethics in the 20th century.

== Reception ==
A. C. Ewing, Paul Welsh and James D. Bastable have reviewed the book.
