= M. C. Bradbrook =

British literary scholar (1909–1993)

Bradbrook in 1969.

Muriel Clara Bradbrook (1909–1993), usually cited as M. C. Bradbrook, was a British literary scholar and authority on Shakespeare. She was Professor of English at Cambridge University, and Mistress (Note: The heads of the traditionally female colleges in Cambridge and Oxford are referred to as Mistress and those of the traditionally male colleges as Master.) of Girton College, Cambridge.

== Biography ==
Born on 27 April 1909, Bradbrook was the eldest child of Annie Wilson (née Harvey) and her husband Samuel Bradbrook, superintendent of HM Waterguard. She was educated at Hutcheson’s Girls’ School, Glasgow, and Oldershaw High School, Wallasey. Between 1927 and 1930 she studied English at Girton College, Cambridge, graduating with first-class honours in both parts of the Cambridge Tripos. She remained at Girton College as a Carlisle Scholar and subsequently as an Ottilie Hancock Research Fellow between 1930 and 1935, obtaining her PhD in 1933. She spent a year at Oxford before returning to Girton College as Lecturer in English and Fellow in 1936. She remained in Cambridge apart from a period working in London for the Board of Trade during the Second World War. By that time, she had already published five major works of literary criticism and throughout the 1950s and 60s she continued to publish on Shakespeare and the Elizabethans.

In all, she wrote some 17 books, including works on Ibsen, Lowry and Conrad. She was appointed a University Lecturer by University of Cambridge in 1948, a Reader in 1962, and Professor of English in 1965 (the first female professor in the Faculty of English). She held visiting professorships at numerous universities, including Santa Cruz, Tokyo, and Rhodes, South Africa, and received honorary degrees from many more. During her period of office as Mistress, Girton College celebrated its centenary (for which she wrote a history, That Infidel Place) and the decision was taken to admit men. She retired in 1976 and became a Life Fellow of Girton College. She died on 11 June 1993.

== Recognition ==
In 2016, the Council of the University of Cambridge approved the use of Bradbrook's name to mark a physical feature within the North West Cambridge Development.

== Works ==
- Elizabethan Stage Conditions: A Study of Their Place in the Interpretation of Shakespeare's Plays (1932)
- Themes and Conventions of Elizabethan Tragedy (1935)
- The School of Night: A Study in the Literature Relationships of Sir Walter Raleigh (1936)
- Andrew Marvell (1940) with M. G. Lloyd Thomas
- Joseph Conrad: Poland's English Genius (1941)
- Ibsen - The Norwegian : A Revaluation (1946)
- T. S. Eliot (1950)
- Shakespeare and Elizabethan Poetry: A Study of His Earlier Work in Relation to the Poetry of the Time (1951)
- Themes & Convention of Elizabethan Tragedy (1952)
- The Queen's Garland : Tudor Poems Now Collected in Honour of Her Majesty Queen Elizabeth II (1953) editor
- The Growth and Structure of Elizabethan Comedy (1955)
- Sir Thomas Malory (1958)
- The Rise of the Common Player: A Study of Actor and Society in Shakespeare's England (1962)
- English Dramatic Form: A History of Its Development (1965)
- Shakespeare's Primitive Art (1965)
- The Tragic Pageant of 'Timon of Athens' (1966)
- That Infidel Place - a Short History of Girton College 1869 – 1969 (1969)
- Shakespeare the Craftsman (1969) Clark Lectures 1968
- Literature in Action: Studies in Continental and Commonwealth Society (1972)
- T.S. Eliot: the Making of 'The Waste Land' (1972)
- Malcolm Lowry: His art and Early Life - a study in transformation (1974)
- The Living Monument : Shakespeare and the Theatre of His Time (1976)
- George Chapman (1977)
- Shakespeare : The Poet in His World (1978)
- In defence of Plato's love in modern literature (1979)
- John Webster, Citizen and Dramatist (1980)
- The Artist and Society in Shakespeare's England (1982) Collected Papers I
- Women and Literature 1779-1982 (1982) Collected Papers II
- Aspects of Dramatic Form in the English and Irish Renaissance (1983) Collected Papers III
- Muriel Bradbrook on Shakespeare (1984)
- Shakespeare in His Context: The Constellated Globe (1989) Collected Papers IV

== Notes ==
Academic offices
Preceded by Mary Cartwright	Mistress of Girton College, Cambridge; 1968–1976	Succeeded by Brenda Ryman
