= Bertha Phillpotts =

British academic & college headmistress

Dame Bertha Phillpotts DBE
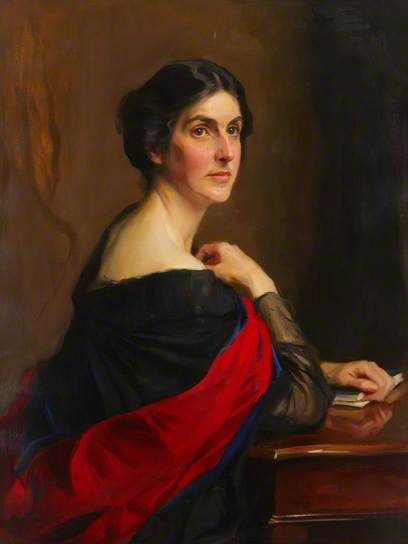
- 1921 portrait by Philip de László
- Born: 25 October 1877; Bedford
- Died: 20 January 1932 (aged 54); Cambridge
- Spouse: Hugh F. Newall (m. 1931)

Academic background
- Education: Girton College, Cambridge

Academic work
- Discipline: Linguistics
- Sub-discipline: Scandinavian languages, literature
- Institutions: Girton College; British Legation, Stockholm; Westfield College

Dame Bertha Surtees Phillpotts DBE (25 October 1877 – 20 January 1932) was an English scholar in Scandinavian languages, literature, history, archaeology and anthropology.

== Biography ==
Phillpotts was born in Bedford on 25 October 1877. Her father, James Surtees Phillpotts (1839–1930), was headmaster of Bedford School and instrumental in turning it from a relatively obscure grammar school to a top-ranking public school. Her mother, Marian Hadfield Phillpotts (née Cordery; 1843–1925), was a competent linguist. Having received all of her basic education at home, in 1898, Phillpotts won a Pfeiffer Scholarship to Girton College in the University of Cambridge, where she studied medieval and modern languages, Old Norse and Celtic under Hector Munro Chadwick. She graduated in 1901 with First Class honours. She then obtained a Pfeiffer Studentship which enabled her to travel to Iceland and Copenhagen to pursue her research. From 1906 to 1909, she worked as librarian at Girton College. In 1911, she won the Gamble Prize for her essay Studies in the Later History of the Teutonic Kindreds. In 1913, she became the first Lady Carlisle Research Fellow at Somerville College, Oxford.

During the First World War, she worked for some time at the British Legation in Stockholm, on a largely voluntary basis. An elder brother, Owen Surtees Phillpotts, was Commercial Attaché at the legation. Bertha's services were requested by the head of mission, Sir Esmé Howard, and she undertook both clerical and research work for him.

Her other elder brother, Brian ("Broo"), was an officer of the Royal Engineers who served in the First World War and was fatally wounded in action near Ypres in September 1917. Her younger sister, Marjory, captained the England Ladies Hockey Team and married William Sealy Gosset.

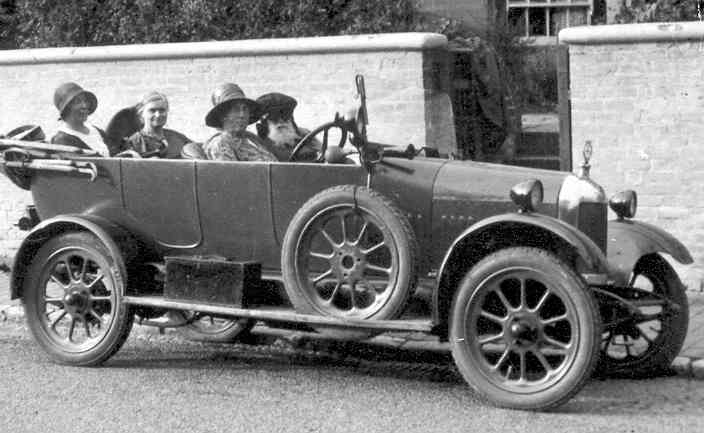
Bertha Surtees Phillpotts' Morris Cowley car Freda (here being driven by her cousin, Mary Clover), c. 1930

She was Principal of Westfield College from 1919 until 1921, and a member of the College Council from 1922 until 1932. She became the Mistress of Girton College in 1922, succeeding Katharine Jex-Blake (1860–1951), who happened to be her first cousin (the daughter of her mother's sister, Henrietta Cordery and Thomas Jex-Blake, sometime Headmaster of Rugby School). She held this post until 1925 when, following the death of her mother, she resigned in order to look after her elderly father who was living in retirement in Tunbridge Wells.

However, she was elected to a research fellowship and continued to be an active Fellow of the college, commuting between Tunbridge Wells and Cambridge in her Morris Cowley car which she nicknamed "Freda".

In 1922, she was selected (as the sole woman member) to serve on the Statutory Commission for the University of Cambridge. She remained a member until she resigned from her post at Girton College in 1925. From 1926 until 1931, she was a member of the Statutory Commission for the University of London. From 1926 until her death in 1932, she was director of Scandinavian studies and university lecturer at Girton College.

Her extensive research work included translations of old Icelandic sagas and studies on the influence of Old Norse and Icelandic on the English language. She is particularly known for her theory of ritual drama as the background to the Eddic poems.

In June 1931, when she was already in failing health, Phillpotts married a long standing friend and fellow Cambridge academic, the astrophysicist and educator, Hugh Frank Newall, FRS.

== Death ==
Phillpotts died from cancer in Cambridge on 20 January 1932, aged 54. She was interred (as Bertha Surtees Newall) next to her parents in Tunbridge Wells Cemetery.

== Honours ==
In recognition of her wartime service at the British Legation in Stockholm, Bertha Surtees Phillpotts was honoured in the Order of the British Empire list for 1918.

In 1929, she was promoted to Dame Commander of the Order of the British Empire (DBE) for her services to education. She was the first female academic to be so honoured.

She was awarded an honorary Doctorate (Litt. D.) by Trinity College, Dublin in 1919.

== Eponymous scholarship ==
The Dame Bertha Phillpotts Memorial Fund for the promotion of Old Norse and Icelandic Studies at the University of Cambridge awards grants and scholarships for postgraduate students and other scholars in the relevant fields.

== Personality ==
Phillpotts possessed a lively personality and an intrepid spirit, as the following tribute by a Cambridge colleague shows:

Is there another woman head of a College, who not only is a yachting expert, but has had distinguished professors for her disciples in the art of sailing? On her first visit to Iceland a pony was the sole companion of her wanderings; and we know not which to admire most – her rapid assimilation of University affairs, when called to serve on the Statutory Commission, or her intrepidity in driving a motor, as to the manner born, through Bridge and Sidney Streets, as a novice with but four or five lessons behind her.

This observation was contributed after her death by Bertha's friend Mary Anderson, Madame de Navarro:

Summer before last she came to stay with us at Blakeney [Norfolk], having motored in ‘Freda’ from Cambridge. She was already not well, and came for a rest. But hearing our son was racing his boat that afternoon she insisted on going in the Parthenia along with him ... The Parthenia came in a long way first, and won the cup. Dame Bertha then leapt into another boat and came in second. The next day she was in another boat and was placed third. I then thought it time to reprove her for racing three times in two days – and she not well. But her only reply was, "Don’t! When you talk to me like that the buttons burst off my shoes!" ... In appearance she was girlish, with a lovely head and a beautiful profile and hair. Her keen eyes and quick, almost bird-like movements but added to her charm. She was one who, for all her learning, her high sense of duty, had a gallant gaiety altogether her own.

An anecdote often narrated to her friends by Phillpotts illustrates her sense of humour. In it she told the story of a night she and her brother Brian Phillpotts ("Broo") had spent at the home of Þorvaldur Bjarnason, Dean of Melstaðir, in 1904. The story, later retold from memory by Marion Delf-Smith, one of Phillpotts' colleagues at Westfield College in London, concerned a stay in a remote house with the Dean, who provided them with a spartan meal of hard dried fish, sour milk, and ship's biscuits too hard to eat; the bed was infested with vermin; and she was visited in her bedroom by a pony which gave her a kick on the leg. Since the same meal was provided the following day, they escaped and made the lengthy journey to the nearest farmhouse in the hope of getting some food and sleep.

== Photographs ==
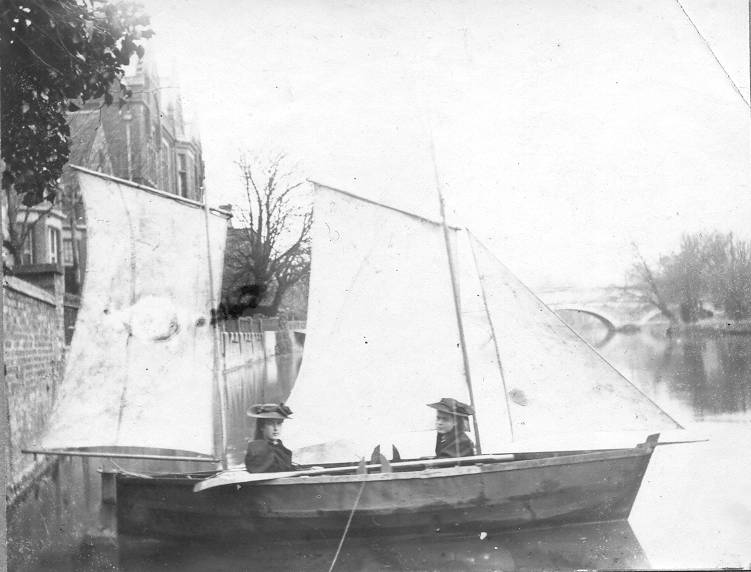
Bertha Phillpotts boating at Bedford with sister Marjory, c. 1896

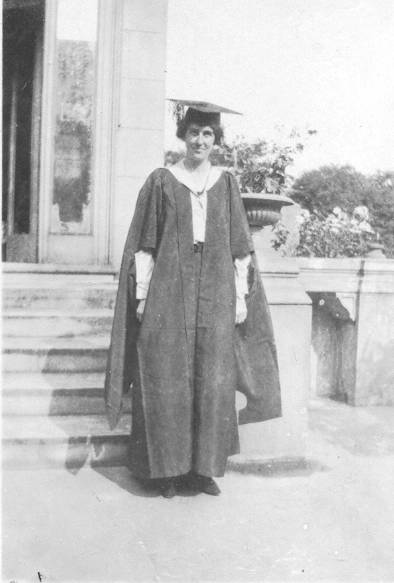
Bertha Phillpotts at Girton College, c.1901

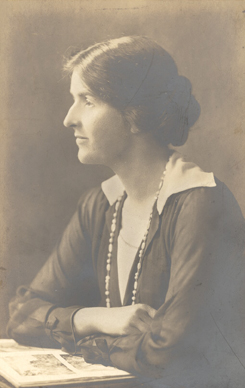
Bertha Phillpotts c.1920 courtesy Queen Mary's College, University of London

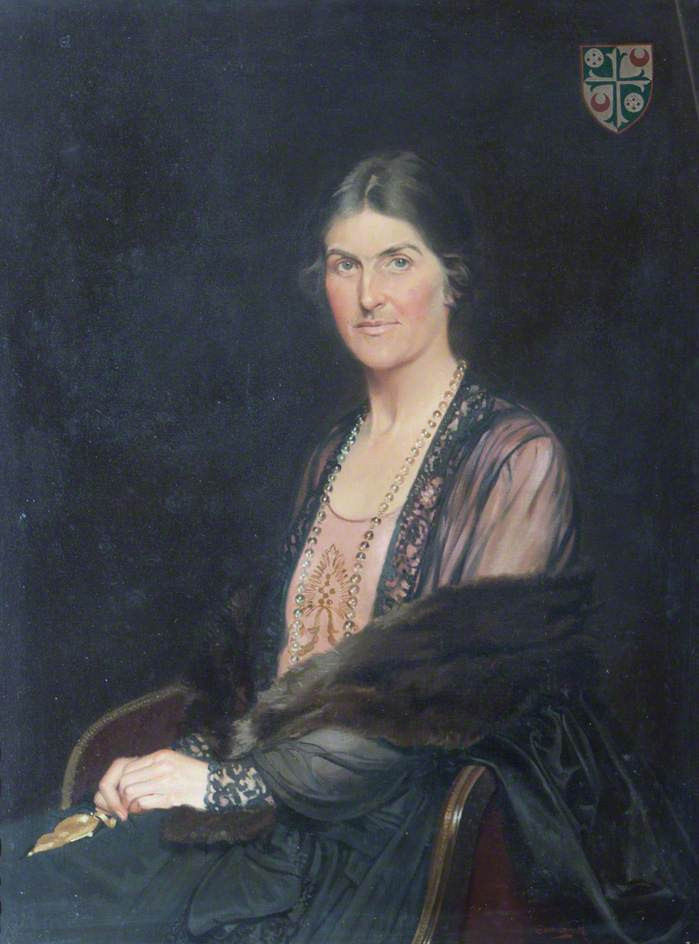
Portrait of Bertha Phillpotts at Girton College, Cambridge courtesy Girton College, Cambridge

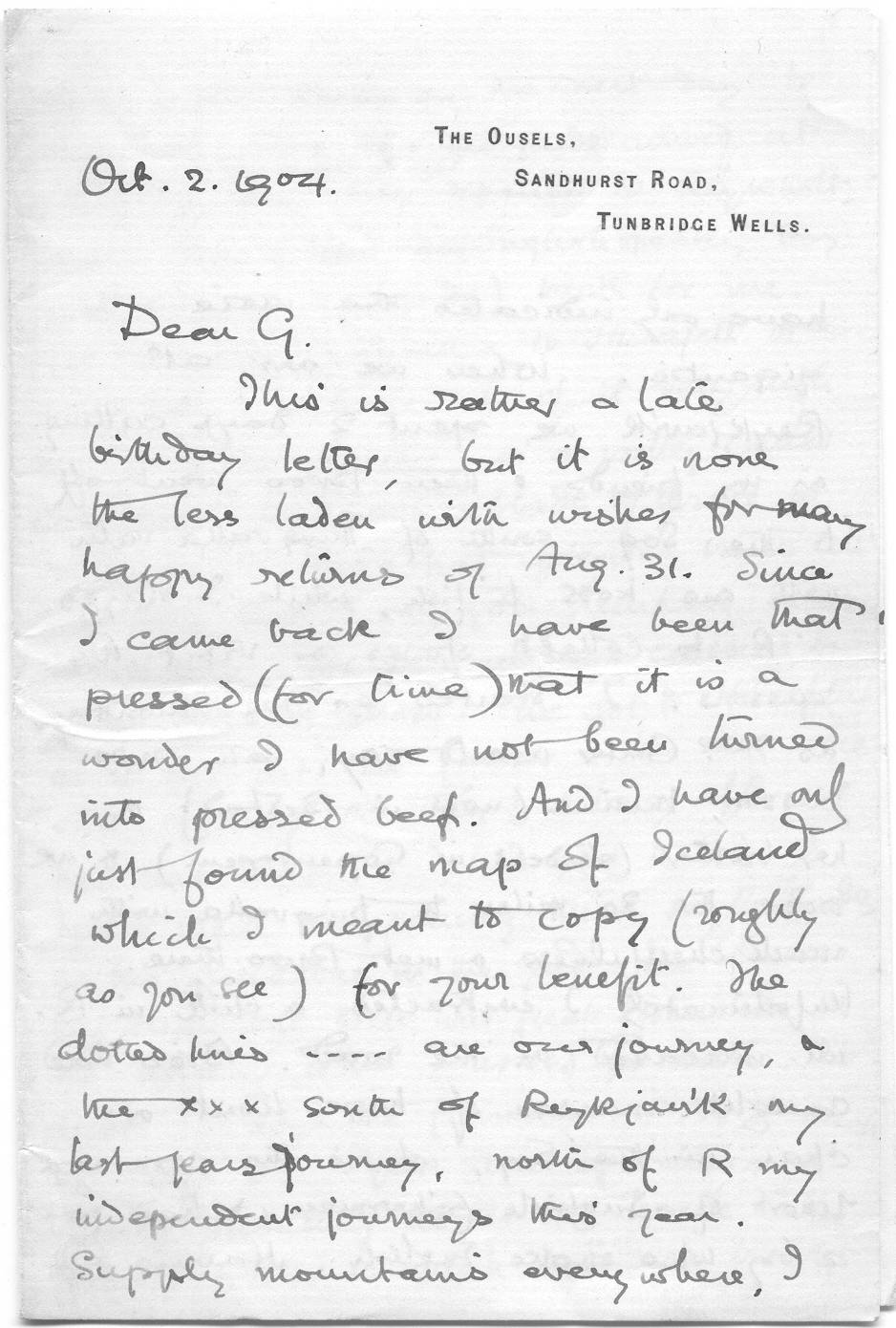
First page of letter, Bertha Phillpotts to her brother Geoffrey, 1904

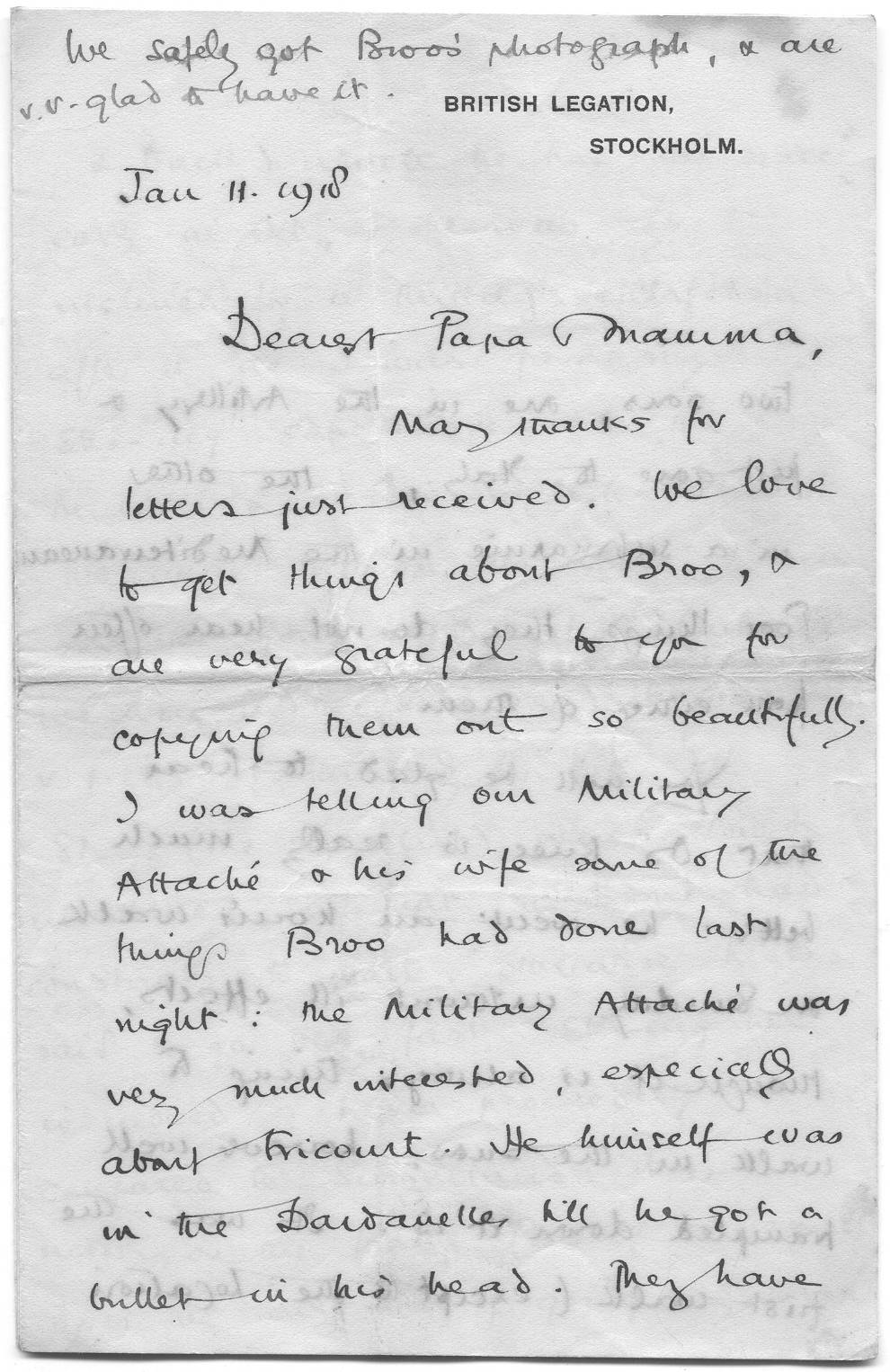
First page of letter, Bertha Phillpotts to her parents, 1918

== Writings ==
Among Dame Bertha Phillpotts's published works are:

- Kindred and Clan (Cambridge: University Press, 1913) (Reissued by Cambridge University Press, 2010. ISBN 978-1-108-01050-4)
- The Elder Edda and Ancient Scandinavian Drama (Cambridge: University Press, 1920) (Reissued by Cambridge University Press, 2011. ISBN 978-1-107-69484-2)
- The Life of the Icelander Jón Ólafsson, Traveller to India (written in Icelandic in 1611 and translated and edited by Bertha S Phillpotts in 1923)
- Wyrd and Providence in Anglo-Saxon Thought (1928, reprinted in Interpretations of Beowulf: a critical anthology. R.D. Fulk, ed. Indiana University Press, 1991)
- Edda and Saga (1931)

Works published about Dame Bertha Phillpotts include:

- Gunnell, Terry. 1999. "Dame Bertha Phillpotts and the Search for Scandinavian Drama". In Anglo-Scandinavian Cross-Currents 1850-1914, ed. Inga-Stina Ewbank (Norwich: Norvik Press). pp. 84–105.
- Poole, Russell. 2002. "Two Students of Boethius". In New Zealand Journal of French Studies.
- Poole, Russell. 2005. "Kindred, College and Scholarship in the Lifework of Bertha Surtees Phillpotts (1877-1932)". In Women Medievalists and the Academy, ed. Jane Chance (Madison: University of Wisconsin).

Academic offices
Preceded by Katharine Jex-Blake	Mistress of Girton College, Cambridge; 1922–1925	Succeeded by Edith Helen Major
