= Edith Major =

Irish born Mistress of Girton College

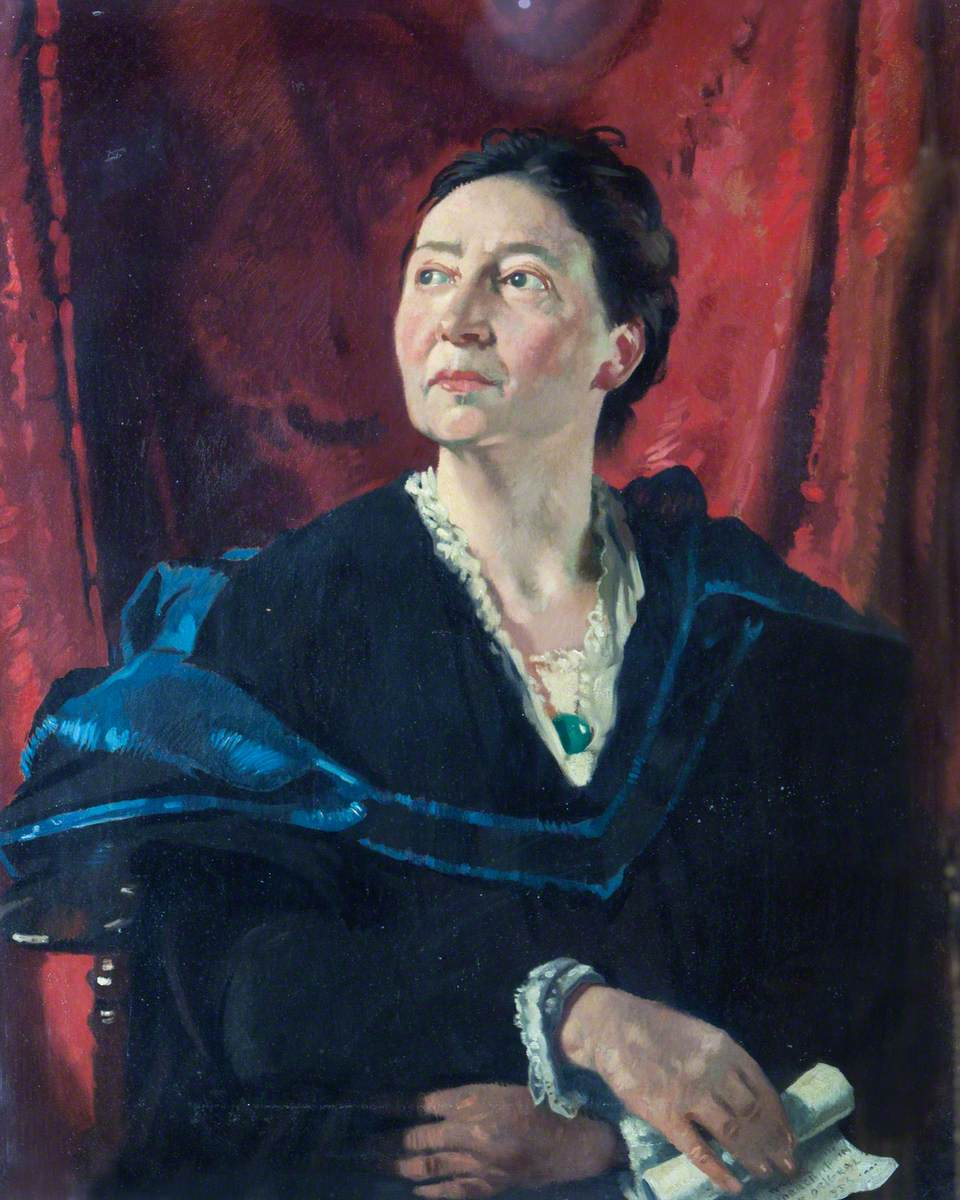
- by James Sinton Sleator
- Born: 15 February 1867; Lisburn
- Died: 17 March 1951 (aged 84); Antrim
- Alma mater: Girton College
- Awards: Commander of the Order of the British Empire (1931); honorary doctorate (1932)

Edith Helen Major, CBE (15 February 1867 – 17 March 1951) was an Irish educationalist. She was Mistress of Girton College Cambridge from 1925 to 1931.

== Early life and education ==
Major was born in Lisburn. Her uncle was Sir Robert McCall, a noted Irish barrister. She was educated at Methodist College Belfast and Girton College, Cambridge. She was one of the "steamboat ladies" who received a degree from Trinity College Dublin, because Cambridge was not yet granting women degrees, at the time.

== Career ==
Major was a member of the faculty at Blackheath High School from 1888 to 1900, and assistant mistress serving under Florence Gadesden. She was Headmistress of Putney High School from 1900 to 1910; and Head Mistress of King Edward VI High School for Girls from 1910 until 1925. After World War I she worked with Belgian refugees. Major succeeded Bertha Phillpotts as Mistress of Girton College, Cambridge, serving from 1925 until 1931. She was succeeded at Girton by Helen M. Wodehouse.

Major was president of the National Federation of University Women, and president of the National Council of Women of Great Britain. She was president of the Association of Head Mistresses from 1919 to 1921. She was an active supporter of the League of Nations.

In 1931 Major became a Commander of the British Empire (CBE). She received an honorary LL.D. degree from Queen's University Belfast in 1931.

== Death and legacy ==
Major died in 1951, at the age of 84, in Antrim. Another former Girton head, Katharine Jex-Blake, died in the same month, and they were honored with a joint memorial service. Girton College has a painting of her by James Sleator.
