= Sleator =

Sleator is a surname. Notable people with the surname include:

- Daniel Sleator (born 1953), American computer scientist
- James Sleator (1886–1950), Irish artist
- William Sleator (1945–2011), American science fiction author
