= Mary Cartwright =

British mathematician (1900–1998)

Dame Mary Cartwright DBE FRS FRSE
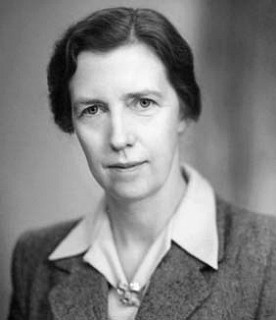
- Cartwright in 1950
- Born: 17 December 1900; Aynho, England
- Died: 3 April 1998 (aged 97); Cambridge, England
- Education: St Hugh's College, Oxford
- Known for: Cartwright's theorem; Research about the Butterfly effect
- Awards: Sylvester Medal (1964); De Morgan Medal (1968)
- Scientific career
- Doctoral advisor: G. H. Hardy
- Doctoral students: Walter Hayman; Elizabeth McHarg
- Other notable students: Sheila Scott Macintyre

Dame Mary Lucy Cartwright DBE FRS FRSE (17 December 1900 – 3 April 1998) was a British mathematician. She was one of the pioneers of what would later become known as chaos theory. Along with J. E. Littlewood, Cartwright saw many solutions to a problem which would later be seen as an example of the butterfly effect.

== Early life and education ==
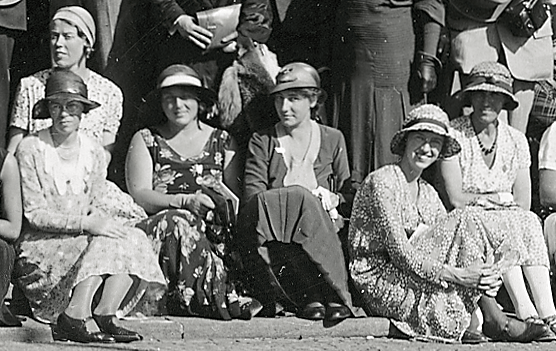
Mary Cartwright (far right) at the International Congress of Mathematicians in 1932.

Mary Cartwright was born on 17 December 1900, in Aynho, Northamptonshire, where her father William Digby was vicar. Through her grandmother Jane Holbech, she descended from poet John Donne and William Mompesson, Vicar of Eyam. She had four siblings, two older and two younger: John (born 1896), Nigel (born 1898), Jane (born 1905), and William (born 1907). Her early education was at Leamington High School (1912–1915), and then at Gravely Manor School in Boscombe (1915–1916) before completion in Godolphin School in Salisbury (1916–1919).

Cartwright studied mathematics at St Hugh's College, Oxford, graduating in 1923 with a first class degree. She was the first woman to attain the final degree lectures and to obtain a first. She briefly taught at Alice Ottley School in Worcester and Wycombe Abbey School in Buckinghamshire before returning to Oxford in 1928 to read for her D.Phil. Cartwright was supervised by G. H. Hardy in her doctoral studies. During the academic year 1928–9 Hardy was at Princeton, so it was E. C. Titchmarsh who took over the duties as a supervisor. Her thesis "The Zeros of Integral Functions of Special Types" was examined by J. E. Littlewood, whom she met for the first time as an external examiner in her oral examination for that 1930 D.Phil.

In 1930, Cartwright was awarded a Yarrow Research Fellowship and went to Girton College, Cambridge to continue working on the topic of her doctoral thesis. Attending Littlewood's lectures, she solved one of the open problems which he posed. Her mathematical theorem, now known as Cartwright's theorem, gives an estimate for the maximum modulus of an analytic function that takes the same value no more than p times in the unit disc. To prove the theorem she used a new approach, applying a technique introduced by Lars Ahlfors for conformal mappings. While at Cambridge Cartwright attended the mathematical lectures of Ludwig Wittgenstein.

== Career ==
Throughout her career, Cartwright wrote over ninety articles on several different mathematical concepts. Her contributions extended to topics such as the Dirichlet series, Abel summation, directions of Borel spreads, analytic functions regular on the unit disk, the zeros of integral functions, maximum and minimum moduli, and functions of finite order in an angle.

In 1936, Cartwright became director of studies in mathematics at Girton College. In 1938, she began work on a new project which had a major impact on the direction of her research. The Radio Research Board of the Department of Scientific and Industrial Research produced a memorandum regarding certain differential equations which came out of modelling radio and radar work. They asked the London Mathematical Society if they could help find a mathematician who could work on these problems and she became interested. The dynamics lying behind the problems were unfamiliar to Cartwright, so she approached Littlewood for help with this aspect. They began to collaborate studying the equations, in particular the Van der Pol oscillator, which greatly surprised the two:

For something to do we went on and on at the thing with no earthly prospect of "results"; suddenly the whole vista of the dramatic fine structure of solutions stared us in the face.

The fine structure described here is today seen to be a typical instance of the butterfly effect. The collaboration led to important results which have greatly influenced the direction that the modern theory of dynamical systems has taken. Although the duo did not supply the answer in time, they succeeded in directing the engineers' attention away from faulty equipment towards practical ways of compensating for the electrical "noise"—or erratic fluctuations—being produced.

In 1945, Cartwright simplified Hermite's elementary proof of the irrationality of π. She set her version of the proof as a Tripos question, later published in an appendix to Sir Harold Jeffreys' book Scientific Inference. In 1947, she was elected to be a Fellow of the Royal Society; although she was not the first woman to be elected to that Society, she was the first female mathematician.

Cartwright was appointed Mistress of Girton in 1948 and a Reader in the Theory of Functions in Cambridge in 1959 until 1968. From 1957 to 1960, she was president of the Cambridge Association of University Women. After retiring from Girton, she was a visiting professor at Brown University from 1968 to 1969 and at Claremont Graduate School from 1969 to 1970. Cartwright died in Cambridge, on 3 April 1998 at the age of 97.

== Recognition ==
Cartwright was the first woman:

- to serve on the Council of the Royal Society
- to be President of the Mathematical Association (in 1951)
- to be President of the London Mathematical Society (in 1961–62)
- to receive the Sylvester Medal (in 1964)
- to receive the De Morgan Medal, the highest award of the London Mathematical Society (in 1968)

In 1968, Cartwright became the first woman to receive the De Morgan Medal, the highest award of the London Mathematical Society, and was elected an Honorary Fellow of The Royal Society of Edinburgh (HonFRSE). In 1969, she was made a Dame Commander of the Order of the British Empire.

In 2026, she was honoured with a blue plaque placed at her former home on 38 Sherlock Close in Cambridge by Historic England as part of the national blue plaques scheme.

== Death ==
Cartwright died in Midfield Lodge Nursing Home in Cambridge in 1998.

== Publications ==
- Cartwright, M. L.; Littlewood, J. E. (1945). "On Non-Linear Differential Equations of the Second Order: I. the Equation $\ddot y - k(1-y^2) \dot y + y = b\lambda k \cos(\lambda t+\alpha),$ $k$ Large". Journal of the London Mathematical Society. s1-20 (3). Wiley: 180–189. doi:10.1112/jlms/s1-20.3.180. ISSN 0024-6107.
- Cartwright, M. L. (1962). Integral functions. Cambridge Tracts in Mathematics and Mathematical Physics. University Press, Cambridge. OCLC 8697638.
- Cartwright, M. L. (1964). "From Non-Linear Oscillations to Topological Dynamics". Journal of the London Mathematical Society. s1-39 (1). Wiley: 193–201. doi:10.1112/jlms/s1-39.1.193. ISSN 0024-6107.

Academic offices
Preceded by Kathleen Teresa Blake Butler	Mistress of Girton College, Cambridge; 1949–1968	Succeeded by Muriel Clara Bradbrook
