= Mary Warnock, Baroness Warnock =

English philosopher of morality, education, and mind, and a writer (1924–2019)

The Right Honourable The Baroness Warnock CH DBE FBA FMedSci
- Warnock in 2011
- Born: Helen Mary Wilson; 14 April 1924; Winchester, England
- Died: 20 March 2019 (aged 94); London, England
- Education: St Swithun's School, Winchester; Prior's Field School; Lady Margaret Hall, Oxford
- Known for: Philosopher of morality, education, and mind, and a writer on existentialism
- Board member of: Active Training and Education Trust
- Spouse: Geoffrey Warnock (m. 1949; died 1995)
- Children: 5
- Relatives: Duncan Wilson (brother); Felix Schuster (maternal grandfather)

Member of the House of Lords
- Lord Temporal
- Life peerage 6 February 1985 – 1 June 2015

Helen Mary Warnock, Baroness Warnock (née Wilson; 14 April 1924 – 20 March 2019) was an English philosopher of morality, education, and mind, and a writer on existentialism. She is best known for chairing an inquiry whose report formed the basis of the Human Fertilisation and Embryology Act 1990. She served as Mistress of Girton College, Cambridge, from 1984 to 1991.

== Early life and education ==
Warnock was born Helen Mary Wilson on 14 April 1924 in Winchester, England, and was the youngest of seven children. Her mother Ethel was the daughter of the successful banker and financier Felix Schuster. Her father Archibald Edward Wilson (1875–1923) was a housemaster and German teacher at Winchester College who died from diphtheria seven months before her birth. Her mother did not marry again.

Warnock was brought up by her mother and a nanny. She never knew her eldest brother, Malcolm (1907–1969), who had autism and was cared for in a nursing home, spending his last days in a Dorset hospital. Another brother died when very young. Her other brother, Duncan Wilson (1911–1983), was a British diplomat who became Ambassador to the Soviet Union before taking up an appointment as master of Corpus Christi College, Cambridge. When Warnock was seven months old the family moved to Kelso House, a three-floor Victorian house, now the music centre at Peter Symonds College. She and her sister Stefana were cared for primarily by the family nanny. Warnock was educated as a boarder at St Swithun's School, Winchester, followed by Prior's Field School in the town of Guildford in Surrey.

Warnock said that when she was a child she was embarrassed by her mother, who looked different from most people, often by wearing long flowing dark red clothes and walking with turned out feet. However, when Warnock was about 15 years old, she began to admire her mother's eccentricity and independent thinking.

The family's inherited wealth offered Warnock a privileged education; starting in 1942 she studied classics at Lady Margaret Hall, Oxford. Her studies were interrupted during the war whilst she taught for two years at Sherborne School for Girls in Dorset. She returned to Oxford and graduated in 1948.

== Career ==
Warnock's birthplace, 27 Kingsgate Street, Winchester

=== Philosophy ===
From 1949 to 1966, Warnock was a fellow and tutor in philosophy at St Hugh's College, Oxford. In addition to her husband Geoffrey Warnock, then a fellow of Magdalen College, her circle during this period included the philosophers Isaiah Berlin, Stuart Hampshire, David Pears and Peter Strawson, as well the authors Kingsley Amis and David Cecil. She participated in radio debates on philosophy broadcast on the Third Programme. She was invited to write on contemporary ethics for a series published by Oxford University Press, which led her to study Sartre and Existentialism, resulting in three books published between 1963 and 1970.

She was Talbot Research Fellow at Lady Margaret Hall from 1972 until 1976. She published a book entitled Imagination in 1976. From 1976 to 1984, she was a senior research fellow at St Hugh's College, and was made an honorary fellow of the college in 1985. She served as mistress of Girton College, Cambridge from 1984 to 1991. She retired in 1992, but continued to serve on public committees and to write and edit books, including The Uses of Philosophy (1992), Imagination and Time (1994) and An Intelligent Person's Guide to Ethics (1998). She delivered the Gifford Lectures, entitled "Imagination and Understanding," at the University of Glasgow in 1992. These lectures would form some of the chapters of her Imagination and Time (1994). In 2000, she was a visiting professor of rhetoric at Gresham College, London.

Warnock wrote extensively on ethics, existentialism, and philosophy of mind.

=== Education ===
In the early 1960s, whilst still teaching at St Hugh's College, Warnock took a seat on the Oxfordshire Local Education Authority. From 1966 to 1972, she was Headmistress at the Oxford High School for Girls, giving up the position when her husband was appointed principal of Hertford College, Oxford. In the late 1970s, she published three books on the topic of education. In the 1980s and 1990s, she wrote a column for the Times Educational Supplement, as well as a pamphlet "Universities: Knowing Our Minds", and gave the Richard Dimbleby Lecture in 1985 on the topic, "Teacher Teach Thyself".

=== Broadcasting ===
Warnock was a member of the Independent Broadcasting Authority from 1972 to 1983. In 1980, she was considered for the post of Chair of the Board of Governors of the BBC.

=== Public policy ===
Because of her background as an educationalist, Warnock was appointed in 1974 to chair a UK inquiry on special education. Her report, published in 1978, brought radical change in the field, by placing emphasis on the teaching of learning-disabled children in mainstream schools and introducing a system of "statementing" children in order for them to gain entitlement to special educational support. Warnock subsequently expressed dissatisfaction with the system that she helped to create, calling it "appalling" because of the expense of its administration and its tendency to deny support to mildly disadvantaged children. She recommended the establishment of a new inquiry.

From 1979 to 1984, she sat on a Royal Commission on environmental pollution. From 1982 to 1984, she chaired the Committee of Inquiry into Human Fertilisation and Embryology. Her report on this occasion gave rise to the Human Fertilisation and Embryology Act 1990, which governs human fertility treatment and experiments using human embryos. Its effect has been to require licensing for procedures such as in vitro fertilisation and to ban research using human embryos more than 14 days old. According to Dame Susan Leather, a former chair of the Human Fertilisation and Embryology Authority, "perhaps the greatest achievement of the Warnock committee is that it managed to get an ethical consensus that people understood as well as shared".

From 1984 to 1989, Warnock chaired a Home Office Committee on animal experimentation; she was a member of the Government advisory panel on spoliation from 1998. In 2008, Warnock, a committed advocate of euthanasia, caused controversy with an opinion that people with dementia should be allowed to elect to die if they felt they were "a burden to their family or the state". Aged 90, Warnock took part enthusiastically in a review of her public life as documented by BBC Sound Archives (12 July 2014).

=== Charity appointments ===
Warnock was the President of Listening Books, a charity providing audiobooks for people who struggle to read due to an illness, disability, learning difficulty or mental health issue. She was a patron of The Iris Project, a charity that promotes the teaching of classics.

== Appointments and honours ==
In the 1984 New Year Honours, she was appointed a Dame Commander of the Order of the British Empire (DBE). Warnock was created a life peer on 6 February 1985, taking the title Baroness Warnock, of Weeke, in the City of Winchester. She sat in the House of Lords as a crossbencher until her retirement from the House on 1 June 2015. Warnock was appointed a member of the Order of the Companions of Honour (CH) in the 2017 New Year Honours for services to charity and to children with special education needs.

Warnock was elected an honorary Fellow of the British Academy (FBA) in 2000 and an Honorary Fellow of the Academy of Medical Sciences (FMedSci) in 2011. She was awarded an honorary D.Litt. degree by the University of Bath in 1987. She was made an Honorary Fellow of Lady Margaret Hall, Oxford in 1984, and of Hertford College, Oxford in 1997.

In 2018, she was named as one of the TES ten most influential people in education, in recognition of her work on special educational needs. That same year, she was awarded the 2018 Dan David Prize for her work in bioethics.

== Personal life ==
Warnock married Geoffrey Warnock, later vice-chancellor of Oxford University, in 1949. They had two sons and three daughters; he died in 1995. She died at her home in London on 20 March 2019.

She was often described as an "atheist Anglican".

== Works ==
As chair of committees of inquiry:

- The Warnock Report (1978): Special Educational Needs. London: HMSO (report by the Committee of Enquiry into the Education of Handicapped Children and Young People)
- Warnock, Mary (1978). Meeting Special Educational Needs: A brief guide by Mrs Mary Warnock to the report of the Committee of Enquiry into Education of Handicapped Children and Young People. London: HMSO
- The Warnock Report (1984): Report of the Committee of Enquiry into Human Fertilisation and Embryology. London: HMSO

As author:

- Ethics Since 1900 (Oxford University Press, 1960); ISBN 0-9753662-2-X
- The Philosophy of Sartre (Hutchinson University Press, 1965)
- Existentialist Ethics (London: Palgrave Macmillan, New York: Springer, 1967) ISBN 9780333011782
- Existentialism (Oxford Paperbacks, 1970) ISBN 0-19-888052-9
- Imagination (1976) ISBN 9780520037243
- Schools of Thought (Faber and Faber, 1977); ISBN 0-571-11161-0
- Memory (1987) ISBN 9780571147830
- The Uses of Philosophy (Blackwell, 1992) ISBN 9780631185833
- Imagination and Time (Blackwell Publishers, 1994) ISBN 0-631-19019-8
- An Intelligent Person's Guide to Ethics (1998); ISBN 0-7156-3320-1 ISBN 9780715646151
- Mary Warnock: A Memoir – People and Places (Duckworth, 2001); ISBN 0-7156-2955-7, ISBN 0-7156-3141-1
- Making Babies: Is There a Right To Have Children? (2001) ISBN 9780192805003
- Nature and Mortality: Recollections of a Philosopher in Public Life (2004); ISBN 0-8264-7323-7
- Easeful Death, with Elisabeth MacDonald (OUP, 2008) ISBN 9780199561841
- Dishonest to God: On Keeping Religion Out of Politics (Continuum, 2010); ISBN 978-1-4411-2712-9
- Critical Reflections on Ownership (Edward Elgar, 2015); ISBN 978-1-78195-547-5
- "Ronald W. Hepburn's Agnosticism", in Szécsényi, Endre (ed.), Aesthetics, Nature and Religion: Ronald W. Hepburn and his Legacy (Aberdeen UP, 2020), pp. 1 - 12, ISBN 978-1-85752-082-8 - ["This book is dedicated to the memory of Mary Warncok (1924-2019)"]

As editor:

- Sartre: A Collection of Critical Essays (1971)
- Women Philosophers, London, J. M. Dent (1996) ISBN 9780460877381
- Art for All?: Their Policies and Our Culture (2000; with Mark Wallinger) ISBN 978-0953977208

== See also ==
- Visiting Gresham Professors

Academic offices
Preceded by Brenda Ryman	Mistress of Girton College, Cambridge; 1986–1989	Succeeded by Juliet J. D'Auvergne Campbell
