= Juliet Campbell (diplomat) =

British diplomat and academic administrator

Juliet Jeanne d'Auvergne Campbell CMG (born 23 May 1935) is a retired British diplomat and academic administrator.

Through most of her career she was known as Juliet Collings.

== Early life ==
Born in London, Campbell is the daughter of Major-General Wilfred d'Auvergne Collings (1893—1984) and his wife Harriet Nancy Draper Bishop, of Saint Peter Port, Guernsey, and was educated at the University of Oxford.

== Career ==
In 1957, after Oxford, Campbell joined the Foreign Office. From 1961 to 1963 she was posted to the Common Market Delegation in Brussels, then returned to the Foreign Office for a year, before serving as a Second and later First Secretary at Bangkok until 1966. She was in the FO News Department, 1967–1970, then was Head of Chancery in the Hague, 1970–1974. After three years in the FO’s European Integration Department, she was posted as Counsellor (Information), to the British Embassy in Paris, 1977–1980. In 1981 she was seconded to the Royal College of Defence Studies, then was posted to Jakarta as a Counsellor, 1982–1983. After three years as Head of the Training Department at the FCO, 1984–1987, she served as British Ambassador to Luxembourg, 1988–1991, her final diplomatic appointment before she retired.

Campbell was appointed as Mistress of Girton College, Cambridge, in 1992, and the next year became Deputy Vice-Chancellor of the University.

Campbell retired from Girton College in 1998.

== Personal life ==
In 1983, Juliet Collings married Professor Alexander Elmslie Campbell, a historian. He died in 2002.

== Publication ==
- Wilfred d'Auvergne Collings, Juliet d'Auvergne Campbell, One Small Island and Two World Wars: The Life and Times of Major General Wilfred d'Auvergne Collings (Oxford: Rimes House, 2016)

== Notes ==
Academic offices
Preceded by Mary Warnock	Mistress of Girton College, Cambridge; 1992–1998	Succeeded by Marilyn Strathern
