= Marilyn Strathern =

British anthropologist, born 1941

Dame Marilyn Strathern DBE FBA
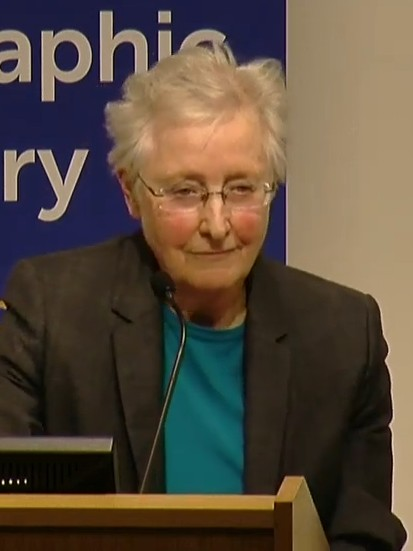
- Strathern in 2016
- Born: Ann Marilyn Evans; 6 March 1941 (age 85); Wales, United Kingdom
- Citizenship: British
- Education: Girton College
- Parent(s): Eric Charles Evans; Joyce Evans
- Scientific career
- Fields: Social anthropology
- Workplaces: Girton College; Trinity College; University of California, Berkeley; Manchester University
- Thesis: Women's status in the Mount Hagen area: a study of marital relations and court disputes among the Melpa-speaking people, New Guinea (1969)
- Doctoral advisor: Paula Brown Glick; Esther N. Goody

Dame Ann Marilyn Strathern (née Evans; born 6 March 1941) is a British anthropologist, who has worked largely with the Mount Hagen people of Papua New Guinea and dealt with issues in the UK of reproductive technologies. She was William Wyse Professor of Social Anthropology at the University of Cambridge from 1993 to 2008, and Mistress of Girton College, Cambridge from 1998 to 2009.

== Early life ==
Marilyn Strathern was born to Eric Evans and Joyce Evans in North Wales on 6 March 1941. Her first formal education experience was at Crofton Lane Primary School, followed by her attendance at Bromley High School. Strathern excelled academically, in part thanks to support and guidance from her mother, a teacher by trade. Following school, she enrolled in Girton College to study Archaeology and Anthropology. She then became a research student there and went on to obtain her PhD in 1968. She married fellow anthropologist Andrew Strathern in 1964 and they had three children together before ending their marriage.

== Career ==
Strathern has held numerous positions over her career, all of which involved her work with the people of Papua New Guinea and her expertise in feminist anthropology. Her career began in 1970, when she was a Researcher for the New Guinea Research Unit of the Australian National University, followed by a stint from 1976 to 1983 where she was a lecturer at Girton College and then Trinity College from 1984-1985, occasionally making guest lectures at the University of California, Berkeley in the United States, Europe and Australia.

She left Cambridge to become Professor of Social Anthropology at Manchester University in 1985. She then returned to Cambridge for the final time in 1993 to take the position of William Wyse Professor of Social Anthropology until her retirement in 2008. During this time, she also held the position of Mistress of Girton College from 1998 to October 2009. Strathern was also co-opted member of the Nuffield Council on Bioethics while also chairing the Working Party on "Human bodies: donation for medicine and research" from 2000 to 2006 and 2010 until 2011.

== Fieldwork in Papua New Guinea ==
From her doctoral thesis published in 1972 titled "Women in Between" to her more recent publications, Strathern is constantly challenging the definitions and social constructs of gender "norms". In her piece "Self-Interest and the Social Good: Some Implications of Hagen Gender Imagery" (1981), Strathern notes that "[g]ender imagery is… a symbolic mechanism whereby "collective" and "personal" interests are made to seem to be of different orders". As editor of a collection of articles in "Dealing with Inequality: Analysing gender relations in Melanesia and beyond", she also brings to the surface the issue of gender "equality" and what it really means, asking if the definitions of the Western world are in fact correct, or if there is still a sense of patriarchal dominance.

Taking this approach when studying in such fields as societies in Papua New Guinea has allowed Strathern to push the boundaries of thought on such topics as reproductive technology, intellectual property, and gender in both Melanesia and the United Kingdom.

Strathern has spent much time among the Hagen of Papua New Guinea. From here she has developed one of the main themes occurring across her work, that the world is ontologically multiple. The world is made up of identifiable parts; however, these parts are not separate from one another. She does not address society specifically, but rather looks at socially-constructed multiple realities which exist interdependently with one another.

== Reproductive technologies ==
Strathern's work in the 1990s became the basis for a new subdiscipline in anthropology concerned with new reproductive technologies such as in vitro fertilization. In her two 1992 publications, After Nature: English Kinship in the Late 20th Century and Reproducing the Future: Essays on Anthropology, Kinship and the New Reproductive Technologies, Strathern argued that existing models of nature and culture were transformed by the explicit use of technology to achieve reproduction. In the co-authored study Technologies of Procreation: Kinship in the Age of Assisted Conception she and her colleagues proposed that new definitions of kinship and descent would emerge as a result of the expansion of new reproductive technologies. These studies paved the way for what has since come to be known as the new kinship studies.

== Selected publications ==
Strathern is the author of numerous publications, including 44 single-authored journal articles, 57 book chapters, and over 15 books written alone or with another author. Her topics vary from Melanesian culture to the culture of the United Kingdom. Strathern's publications on the Melanesian culture focus on gender relations, legal anthropology and feminist scholarship, while her publications on the culture of the United Kingdom lean towards kinship, audit culture, reproductive and genetic technologies. The book she enjoyed writing the most, according to an interview with the American Anthropological Association in 2011, was Partial Connections, written in 1991. Her most famous book, however, is The Gender of Gift published in 1988.

In The Gender of Gift, she uses a feminist approach in a new way to argue that Papuan women are not being exploited, but rather the definition is different. Gender, she notes, is defined differently there than it is in the United Kingdom. Strathern also brings to the surface the fact that theories are dominating themselves and while she knows as an anthropologist, she cannot separate herself from them, she does state that she offers a "narrative" over an analysis of the situation.

=== Other publications ===
- (with Andrew Strathern) Self-Decoration in Mount Hagen (1971)
- Women in Between (1972)
- No Money on Our Skins: Hagen Migrants in Port Moresby (1975) ISBN 0-85818-027-8
- (ed. with C. MacCormack) Nature, Culture and Gender (1980) ISBN 978-0-521-28001-3
- Kinship at the Core: an Anthropology of Elmdon, Essex (1981) ISBN 0-521-23360-7
- The Gender of the Gift: Problems with Women and Problems with Society in Melanesia (1988) ISBN 0-520-07202-2
- Partial connections. Savage, Maryland: Rowman and Littlefield (1991). Re-issued by AltaMira Press, Walnut Creek, CA. (2004)
- After Nature: English Kinship in the Late Twentieth Century (1992) ISBN 978-0-521-42680-0
- Reproducing the Future: Essays on Anthropology, Kinship and the New Reproductive Technologies (1992) ISBN 978-0-719-03674-3
- (with Jeanette Edwards, Sarah Franklin, Eric Hirsch and Frances Price) Technologies of Procreation: Kinship in the Age of Assisted Conception (1993) ISBN 9780415170567
- Property, substance and effect. Anthropological essays on persons and things. London: Athlone Press (1999) Collected essays, 1992-98 ISBN 0-485-12149-2
- Commons and borderlands: working papers on interdisciplinarity, accountability and the flow of knowledge (2004) ISBN 0-9545572-2-0
- (ed. with Eric Hirsch) Transactions and creations: property debates and the stimulus of Melanesia (2004), Oxford: Berghahn.
- (ed) Audit Cultures. Anthropological studies in accountability, ethics and the academy. (2000) London: Routledge.
- Kinship, law and the unexpected: Relatives are always a surprise. Cambridge: Cambridge University Press (2005) ISBN 0-521-61509-7
- Relations: An Anthropological Account. Durham: Duke University Press (2020) ISBN 978-1-4780-0835-4

== Honours ==
The Strathern Annual Lecture was established in 2011 to honour the multifaceted achievements of Dame Marilyn Strathern, and invites a prominent anthropologist. The inaugural lecture was delivered by Strathern herself, titled "Gifts Money Cannot Buy".

In 1987, she was elected Fellow of the British Academy (FBA).

- Foreign Honorary Member, American Academy of Arts & Sciences (1996)
- Dame Commander of the Order of the British Empire for services to Social Anthropology (2001)
- Rivers Memorial Medal, Royal Anthropologist Inst. (1976)
- Viking Fund Medal, Wenner-Gren Foundation for Anthropological Research (2003) (last awarded in 1972.)
- Huxley Medal (2004)
- 30th Anniversary Independence Medal, Papua New Guinea (2005)
- Elected to the American Philosophical Society (2016)

In 2000, artist Daphne Todd was commissioned by Girton College, Cambridge, to paint a portrait of Mistress Marilyn Strathern. This painting, which depicted Marilyn with two heads on separate panels, went on to win Todd the Royal Society of Portrait Painters’ Ondaatje for Portraiture in 2001.

=== Honorary degrees ===
- Honorary Degree Sc. Edinburgh (1993)
- Honorary Degree Sc. Copenhagen (1994)
- Honorary Degree Lit, Oxford (2004)
- Honorary Degree Pol., Helsinki (2006)
- Honorary Degree, Panteion University, Athens (2006)
- Honorary Degree Sc., Durham (2007)
- Honorary Degree Philosophy, University Papua New Guinea (2009)
- Honorary Degree Social Sciences, Belfast (2009)
- Honorary Doctorate, Australian National University (2015)
- Honorary Doctorate, Harvard University (2019)

Academic offices
Preceded by Juliet Jeanne d'Auvergne Campbell	Mistress of Girton College, Cambridge; 1998–2009	Succeeded by Susan J. Smith
Preceded by Ernest Gellner	William Wyse Professor of Social Anthropology at the University of Cambridge; 1993–2008	Succeeded by Henrietta Moore
