= Jex =

Jex is a surname. Notable people with the surname include:

- Garnet Jex (1895–1979), American artist and historian
- William Jex (1885−1934), British footballer

== See also ==
- Jex-Blake
- JEX
