= Elizabeth Welsh =

British classicist and school principal (1843–1921)

Elizabeth Welsh (3 March 1843 – 13 February 1921) was a classicist and the second longest running Mistress of Girton College, Cambridge.

== Life and career ==
Elizabeth Welsh was born in 1843 in County Down, Ireland, to John Welsh and his wife Elizabeth Dalzell. She was the eldest of their four daughters. Welsh was educated first at home, then at various private schools and by the vicar of her parish, who taught her Latin and Greek. In 1872, she went up to Girton College, Cambridge, to study Classics. After completing the Tripos in 1875, she taught at Manchester High School before returning to Girton in 1876 as a tutor in classics.

Welsh became vice-mistress of Girton in 1880 after the Mistress, Marianne Bernard, devolved some of her responsibilities. She succeeded her as Mistress of Girton in 1885, the first person who had studied at Girton to be Mistress. Shortly after her appointment, she was made a member of the Girton governing body and was elected to the executive committee, becoming the first Mistress to have a say in the government of the college. She held this post until her retirement in 1903. She died in Edinburgh on 13 February 1921, and was buried at the Girton Churchyard.

Academic offices
Preceded by Marianne Bernard	Mistress of Girton College, Cambridge; 1885–1903	Succeeded by Constance Jones
