= Elisabeth Kendall =

British Arabist

Elisabeth Kendall (born February 1971) is a British Arabist, academic and commentator, and Mistress of Girton College, Cambridge, whose scholarship has ranged from Middle Eastern literatures to militant jihad. She is best known for her work on how Islamist extremists exploit Arabic cultures and traditions.

== Biography ==
She attended Beaconsfield High School before reading Oriental Studies at Pembroke College, Oxford, where she gained a first-class degree and was awarded the Schacht Memorial Prize. She secured her first lectureship at Pembroke College, Oxford. She was awarded a Kennedy Scholarship to pursue her doctoral research at Harvard University.

From 2000 to 2010, she held positions at St Antony's College, Oxford then the University of Edinburgh, where she was appointed Director of the Centre for the Advanced Study of the Arab World (CASAW). From 2010 to 2022, she was Senior Research Fellow in Arabic and Islamic Studies at Pembroke College, Oxford. She spends significant time in the field, particularly in Yemen.

Kendall edits the "Essential Middle Eastern Vocabularies" series, for which she also authored three volumes: Diplomacy Arabic, Intelligence Arabic and Media Arabic. Kendall appears frequently in the international television, radio and print media. She has been invited to present her research to governments, military and intelligence audiences all around the world.

She was elected the twentieth Mistress of Girton College, Cambridge, from 1 October 2022.

In 2022, Kendall was elected as an Honorary Fellow of Pembroke College, Oxford “in recognition of her distinguished academic career as a British Arabist".

In 2023, she was awarded an Honorary Doctorate by the University of Glasgow “in recognition of the major contribution made to Arabic Studies”.

== Publications ==
- Diplomacy Arabic, coauthored with Yehia A. Mohamed, Edinburgh University Press, 2020
- Reclaiming Islamic Tradition: Modern Interpretations of the Classical Heritage, collection of articles co-edited with Ahmad Khan, Edinburgh University Press, 2016.
- Twenty-First Century Jihad: Law, Society and Military Action (series: Library of Modern Religion), collection of articles co-edited with Ewan Stein, I.B.Tauris, 2015.
- Literature, Journalism and the Avant-Garde: Intersection in Egypt (series: Routledge Studies in Middle Eastern Literatures), Routledge, 2006.

Academic offices
Preceded by Susan Jane Smith	Mistress of Girton College, Cambridge; 2022–present	Incumbent
