= James Ward (psychologist) =

English psychologist (1843–1925)

James Ward FBA
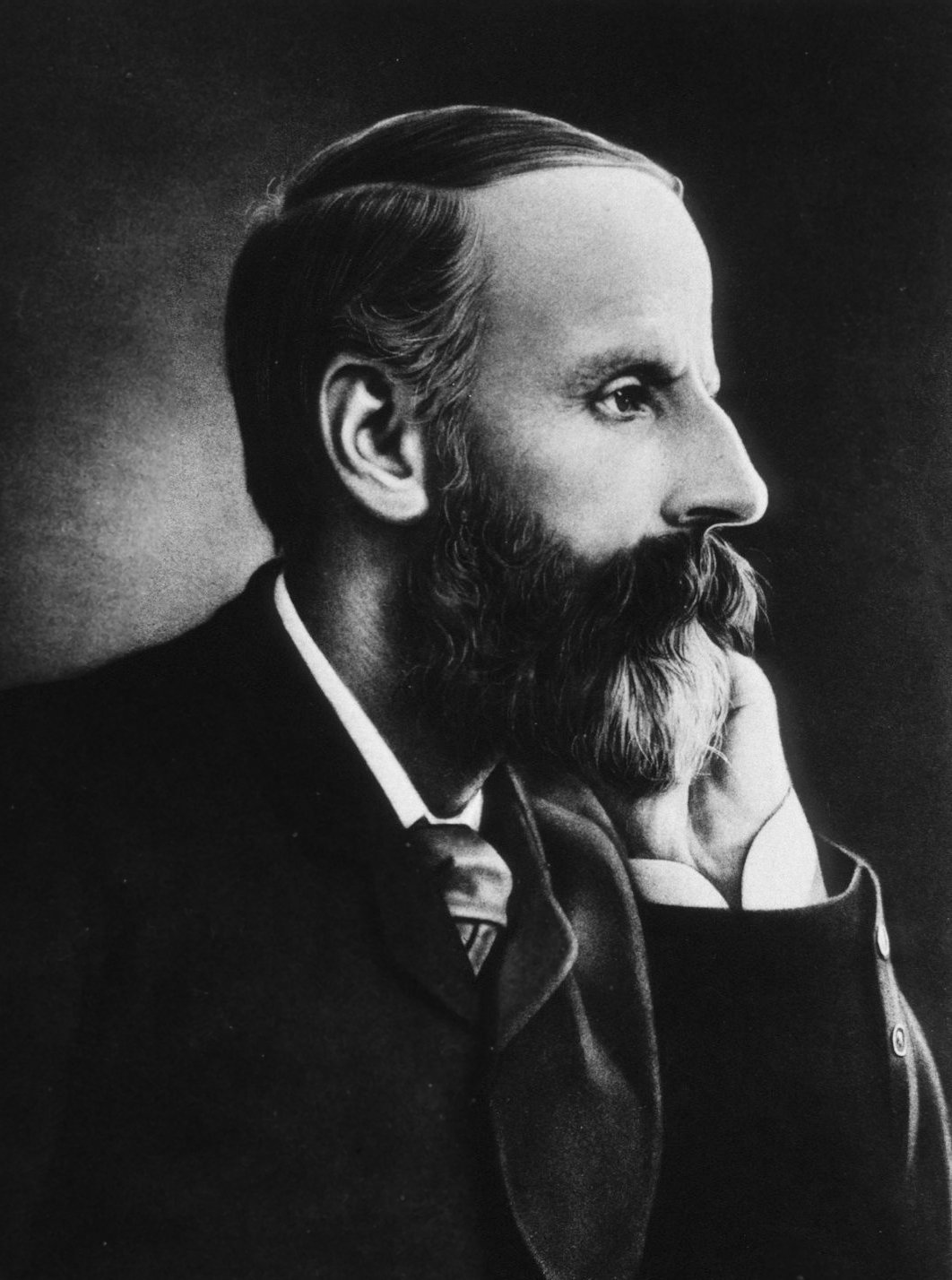
- Born: 27 January 1843; Kingston upon Hull, England
- Died: 4 March 1925 (aged 82); Cambridge, England
- Spouse: Mary Ward (m. 1884)

Education
- Education: Spring Hill College; University of London; University of Göttingen; Trinity College, Cambridge
- Academic advisors: Hermann Lotze; Adolf Trendelenburg

Philosophical work
- Era: Contemporary philosophy
- Region: Western philosophy
- School: British idealism; Pluralistic idealism
- Institutions: Trinity College, Cambridge
- Notable students: Constance Jones; G. E. Moore; Bertrand Russell; George Stout
- Main interests: Philosophy of psychology
- Notable ideas: Panpsychism

James Ward (27 January 1843 – 4 March 1925) was an English psychologist and philosopher. He was a Cambridge Apostle.

== Life ==
Ward was born in Kingston upon Hull, the eldest of nine children. His father was an unsuccessful merchant. Ward was educated at the Liverpool Institute and Mostyn House, but his formal schooling ended when his father became bankrupt.

Apprenticed to a Liverpool architect for four years, Ward studied Greek and logic and was a Sunday school teacher. In 1863, he entered Spring Hill College, near Birmingham, to train for the Congregationalist ministry. An eccentric and impoverished student, he remained at Spring Hill until 1869, completing his theological studies as well as gaining a University of London BA degree.

In 1869–1870, Ward won a scholarship to Germany, where he attended the lectures of Isaac Dormer in Berlin before moving to Göttingen to study under Hermann Lotze. On his return to Britain Ward became minister at Emmanuel Congregational Church in Cambridge, where his theological liberalism unhappily antagonised his congregation. Sympathetic to Ward's predicament, Henry Sidgwick encouraged Ward to enter Cambridge University. Initially a non-collegiate student, Ward won a scholarship to Trinity College in 1873, and achieved a first class in the moral sciences tripos in 1874.

With a dissertation entitled The Relation of Physiology to Psychology, Ward won a Trinity fellowship in 1875. Some of this work, An Interpretation of Fechner's Law, was published in the first volume of the new journal Mind (1876).

For the rest of his life, the Dictionary of National Biography reports that he:

...held himself aloof from all institutional religion; but he did not tend towards secularism or even agnosticism; his early belief in spiritual values and his respect for all sincere religion never left him.

During 1876–1877 he returned to Germany, studying in Carl Ludwig's Leipzig physiological institute. Back in Cambridge, Ward continued physiological research under Michael Foster, publishing a pair of physiological papers in 1879 and 1880.

From 1880 onwards Ward moved away from physiology to psychology. His article Psychology for the ninth edition of the Encyclopædia Britannica – criticising associationist psychology with an emphasis upon the mind's active attention to the world – became enormously influential.

Ward was a strong supporter of women's education, and met his Irish-born suffragist wife-to-be, Mary (née Martin), when she attended one of his series of lectures. The couple married in Nottingham on 31 July 1884, and settled in Cambridge in a house built for them by J. J. Stevenson. She went on to become a lecturer in moral sciences at Newnham College, and a member of the Ladies Dining Society. They had two daughters and a son.

Ward was elected to the new Chair of Mental Philosophy and Logic in 1897, his students including G. E. Moore, Bertrand Russell, Mohammed Iqbal and George Stout. He served as president of the Aristotelian Society from 1919 to 1920.

Ward died in Cambridge, and was cremated at Cambridge Crematorium.

== Philosophical work ==
Ward defended a philosophy of panpsychism based on his research in physiology and psychology which he defined as a "spiritualistic monism". In his Gifford Lectures and his book Naturalism and Agnosticism (1899) he argued against materialism and dualism and supported a form of panpsychism where reality consists in a plurality of centers of activity. Ward's philosophical views have a close affinity to the pluralistic idealism of Gottfried Wilhelm Leibniz. Ward had believed that the universe is composed of "psychic monads" of different levels, interacting for mutual self- betterment. His theological views have been described by some as a "personal panentheism".
