= Cartwright's theorem =

Mathematical theorem in complex analysis

Cartwright's theorem is a mathematical theorem in complex analysis, discovered by the British mathematician Mary Cartwright. It gives an estimate of the maximum modulus of an analytical function when the unit disc takes the same value no more than p times.

== Statement ==
Cartwright's theorem says that, for every integer $p \ge 1$, there exists a constant $C_p$ such that for every $p$-valent holomorphic function $f(z) = \sum_{i=0}^\infty a_n z^n$ in disc $|z| < 1$, we have the bound

$$|f(z)| \leq \frac{\max_{0 \leq i \leq p}|a_i|}{(1-r)^{2p}} C_p$$

in an absolute value for all $z$ in the disc $|z| \leq r$ and $r \leq 1$.
