= Susan J. Smith =

British geographer and academic

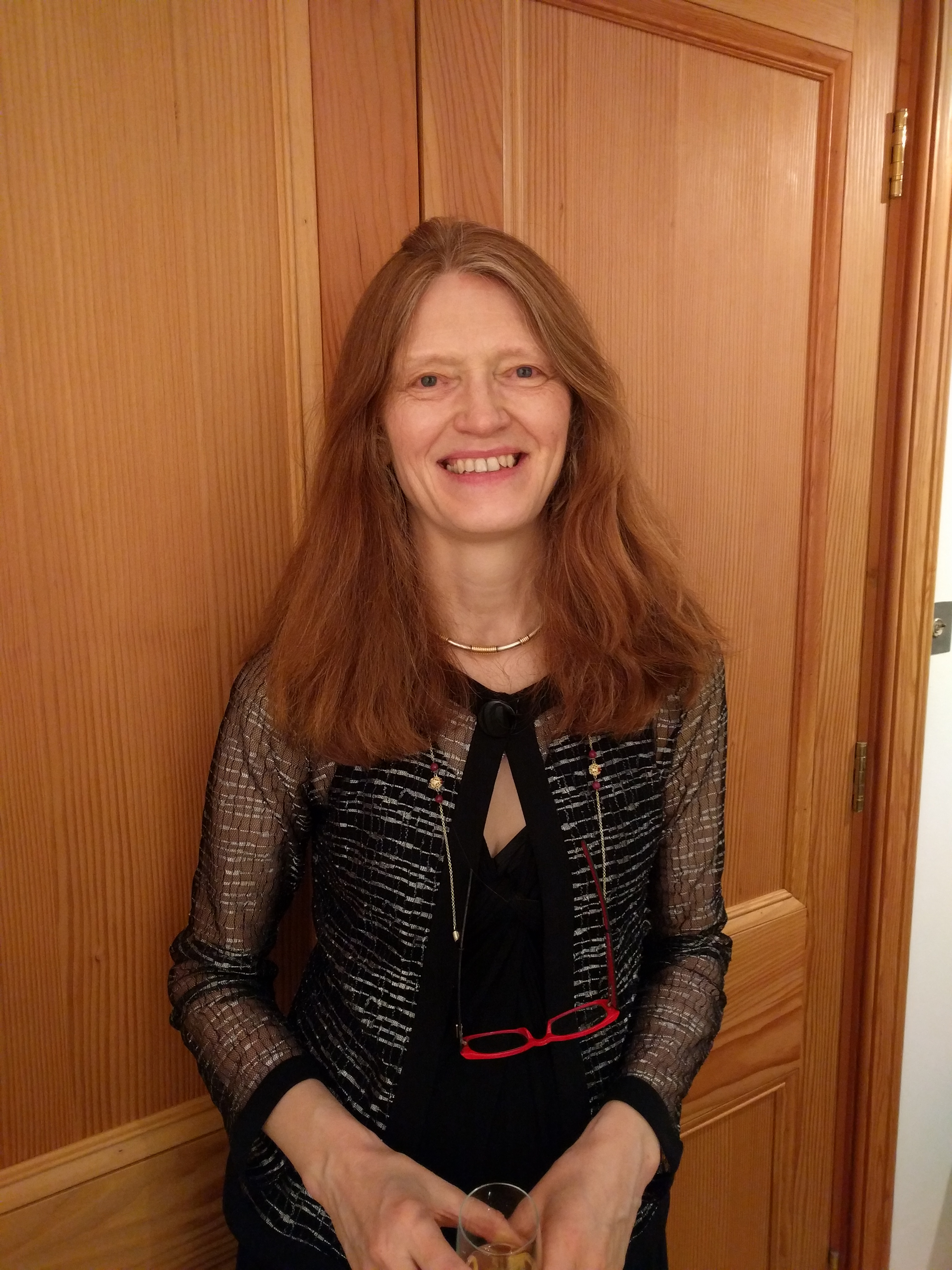
- Born: 1956 (age 69–70)
- Education: St Anne's College, Oxford; Nuffield College
- Scientific career
- Fields: Geography
- Workplaces: Girton College, Cambridge
- Thesis: Crime and the structure of social relations within a British city: a geographical critique, with reference to north central Birmingham (1982)

Susan Jane Smith FBA FAcSS FRSE (born 1956) is a British geographer and academic. She became President of the British Academy in July 2025. She was mistress of Girton College, Cambridge from 2009 to 2022. Smith previously held the Ogilvie Chair of Geography at the University of Edinburgh from 1990 to 2004 and until 2009 was a professor of geography at Durham University, where she played a key role in establishing the Institute of Advanced Study. On 1 October 2011, she was conferred the title of Honorary Professor of Social and Economic Geography in the Department of Geography at the University of Cambridge for five years, which was renewed until 2021.

She studied at Oxford University, reading geography at St Anne's College and completing her DPhil at Nuffield College. She held research fellowships at St Peter's College, Oxford, Brunel University and the University of Glasgow.

Smith's research is concerned with the challenge of inequality, addressing themes such as residential segregation, housing for health, and fear of crime. Her current work focuses on inequalities in the housing market. In 2010, Smith gave the Tanner Lectures on Human Values at Cambridge University with the title "Care-full markets – Miracle or Mirage?" which examined—from a perspective of the ethics of care—the moral economy of the housing market. Her work combines qualitative and quantitative approaches, and she is interested in an array of participatory techniques. In collaboration with Dr Mia Gray and the Menagerie Theatre Company, Smith has developed a project on "public choices in times of austerity", an experiment in dramatising the findings of a study in Interactive Forum Theatre style.

Smith plays euphonium with the City of Cambridge Brass Band.

== Honours ==
In 1999, Smith was elected a Fellow of the Academy of Social Sciences (FAcSS). In 2000, she was elected Fellow of the Royal Society of Edinburgh. In 2008, she was elected Fellow of the British Academy (FBA). In 2010, she was appointed a Tanner lecturer at Clare Hall, Cambridge, a recognition for "uncommon achievement and outstanding abilities in the field of human values". In 2014, she was awarded the Victoria Medal of the Royal Geographical Society.

Academic offices
Preceded by Marilyn Strathern	Mistress of Girton College, Cambridge; 2009–2022	Succeeded by Elisabeth Kendall
