= Annie Austin =

Annie Crowe Austin was Mistress of Girton College, Cambridge from October 1870 until illness forced her to relinquish her duties in May 1872. Emily Davies took over from her, at first on an interim basis, and from October 1872, as Austin's permanent successor.

Academic offices
Preceded by Emily Anne Eliza Shirreff	Mistress of Girton College, Cambridge; 1870–1872	Succeeded by Emily Davies
