= Harry Steere =

British flying ace of WWII

Flight Lieutenant Harry Steere DFC DFM
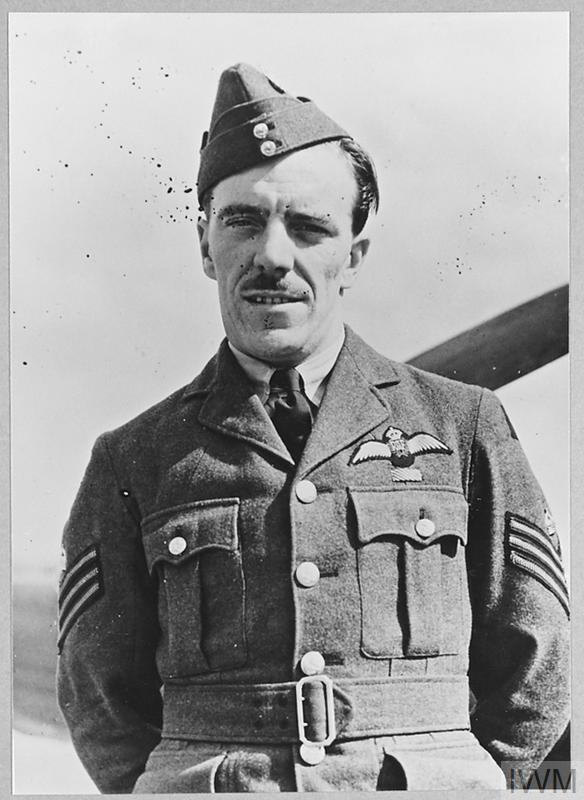
- Steere, September 1940
- Born: 7 February 1914; Wallasey, United Kingdom
- Died: 9 June 1944 (aged 30) near Orgères, France
- Burial place: St. Erblon Cemetery, France
- Military career
- Allegiance: United Kingdom
- Branch: Royal Air Force
- Service years: 1930–1944 †
- Rank: Flight Lieutenant
- Units: No. 19 Squadron; No. 627 Squadron
- Conflicts: Second World War: Operation Dynamo; Battle of Britain
- Awards: Distinguished Flying Cross; Distinguished Flying Medal

Harry Steere, DFC, DFM (7 February 1914 – 9 June 1944) was a British flying ace who served in the Royal Air Force (RAF) during the Second World War. He was credited with having shot down at least eleven aircraft.

Born in Wallasey, Steere joined the RAF in 1930 as an apprentice tradesman. Qualifying as a metal rigger three years later, he subsequently trained as a pilot and was posted to No. 19 Squadron. He achieved several aerial victories while the squadron operated over the evacuation beaches at Dunkirk during Operation Dynamo. Awarded the Distinguished Flying Medal, he later flew during the Battle of Britain, gaining more successes. Afterwards he performed instructing duties for nearly three years before returning to operational flying with a posting to No. 627 Squadron, a Bomber Command unit. He was killed in action near Orgères, in France, on 9 June 1944. An award of a Distinguished Flying Cross was announced after his death.

== Early life ==
Harry Steere was born on 7 February 1914 in Wallasey, Cheshire, the son of a master mariner, Ernest Steere, and his wife. Steere attended Manor Road Council School and then, on a scholarship, Oldershaw Grammar School. When he was sixteen, he joined the Royal Air Force (RAF) as an apprentice tradesman. He trained at Haldon as a metal rigger, qualifying in August 1933.

In 1935, Steere volunteered to train as a pilot and was awarded his wings in August 1936 as a sergeant pilot. Two years later he was promoted to flight sergeant, by which time he was serving with No. 19 Squadron. His unit, based at Duxford, was the first in the RAF to operate the Supermarine Spitfire fighter.

== Second World War ==
Following the outbreak of the Second World War, No. 19 Squadron was mostly engaged in convoy patrols and saw little action for several months. On 11 May 1940, Steere and two other pilots combined to destroy a Junkers Ju 88 medium bomber several miles east of the Dudgeon lightship, which was the squadron's first aerial victory of the war.

=== Dunkirk ===
In late May, No. 19 Squadron was involved in providing aerial cover over Dunkirk during Operation Dynamo, the evacuation of the British Expeditionary Force from northern France. On 26 May Steere shot down a Junkers Ju 87 dive bomber over Dunkirk, and shared in the destruction of a Dornier Do 17 medium bomber the next day in the same area, although the latter could not be confirmed. He destroyed a Messerschmitt Bf 109 fighter on 28 May, again over Dunkirk, and on the first day of June, shot down a Do 17. Earlier in the day, he had shared in the destruction of a Bf 109 to the north of Dunkirk. In recognition of his successes over Dunkirk he was awarded the Distinguished Flying Medal. The citation, published in The London Gazette, read:

Flight Sergeant Steere has destroyed three enemy aircraft and has assisted in the destruction of three others. He has displayed considerable coolness and gallantry in the face of the enemy, and has at all times set an example to his fellow pilots by his devotion to duty.

— London Gazette, No. 34951, 25 June 1940

=== Battle of Britain ===
In the weeks after its operations over Dunkirk, No. 19 Squadron was involved in trials with cannon-equipped Spitfires. This armament proved to be unreliable and affected the squadron's operations in the early stages of the Battle of Britain. Steere, flying one of the squadron's machine-gun-equipped aircraft, shared in the destruction of a Messerschmitt Bf 110 heavy fighter to the east of Aldeburgh on 19 August.

By the start of September, the squadron had reverted to the standard machine-gun equipment and was regularly flying as part of the Duxford Wing. Steere intercepted and probably destroyed a Bf 110 to the south of London on 9 September. On Battle of Britain Day, 15 September, he claimed a Bf 109 as probably destroyed and also destroyed a Do 17 over London. Three days later he shared in the shooting down of a Heinkel He 111 medium bomber and a Ju 88 over the Thames Estuary.

On 27 September, Steere destroyed a Bf 109 near Deal. By this time, the pace of operations had begun to slow, but No. 19 Squadron still periodically encountered the Luftwaffe. On 28 November, Steere shot down a Bf 109 east of Ramsgate, his final aerial victory.

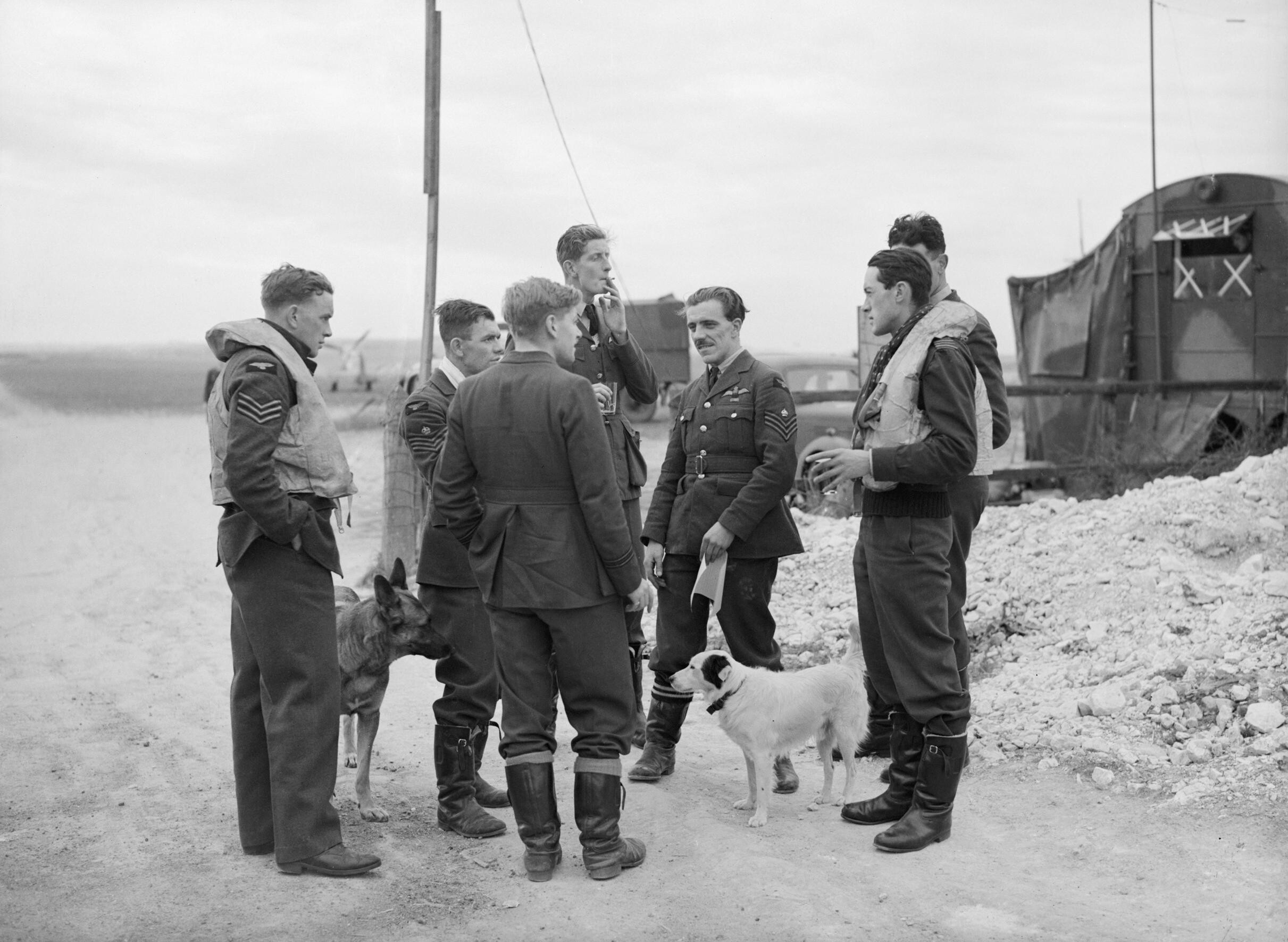
Steere stands in the centre of this group of No. 19 Squadron pilots at Fowlmere, September 1940. The commander, Squadron Leader Brian Lane, stands in profile on the right

== Later war service ==
In December Steere was posted to Upavon to attend an instructors course at the Central Flying School. His brother, Jack Steere, was also serving in the RAF and happened to be at Upavon at the same time. Steere was then sent to Montrose to serve as an instructor at No. 8 Flying Training School. He was commissioned as a pilot officer in late June 1941, and then promoted to flying officer the following April. In November 1943, Steere, by now a flight lieutenant, returned to operational flying with a posting to Bomber Command, with No. 627 Squadron. His new unit, based at Oakington and equipped with the de Havilland Mosquito, was part of the Pathfinder Force.

On 9 June 1944, Steere and his navigator, Flying Officer K. Gale of the Royal Australian Air Force, was attacking railroad infrastructure at Rennes in France. Their Mosquito crashed near Orgères, killing both men. Steere was subsequently awarded the Distinguished Flying Cross. The published citation read:

Recently, this officer piloted an aircraft detailed to attack gun emplacements sited on the French coast. In spite of continuous heavy anti-aircraft fire, Flight Lieutenant Steere spent much time over the target area in order to identify accurately the precise target. Finally, his aircraft was struck by a shell which severely damaged the starboard elevator, forcing the aircraft into an uncontrollable climb. Displaying great coolness, Flight Lieutenant Steere promptly transmitted clear instructions to his deputy to assume control of the operation. He afterwards succeeded in regaining a measure of control and flew the damaged aircraft back to this country. He displayed a high degree of skill, courage and devotion to duty. This officer has completed a large number of varied sorties.

— London Gazette, No. 36578, 25 October 1940

Steere, survived by his wife and son, was buried at St. Erblon Cemetery in France. At the time of his death, he was credited with having shot down eleven German aircraft, five of which were shared with other pilots, and two probably destroyed. In addition, one shared German aircraft was unconfirmed as destroyed.
