= Arthur John Jex-Blake =

British physician

Arthur John Jex-Blake FRCP (31 July 1873 – 16 August 1957) was a British physician, specializing in heart and lung diseases.

== Biography ==
After education at Eton, Arthur John Jex-Blake matriculated at Magdalen College, Oxford, where he graduated BA in 1894, MA in 1901, BM and BCh in 1901, and DM in 1913. He entered as a University scholar at St George's Hospital Medical School, where he received his medical education. In 1902 the University of Oxford awarded him a Radcliffe travelling fellowship, enabling him to visit Vienna, Copenhagen, and Baltimore. He was appointed to the staff of the Victoria Hospital for Children and then became an assistant physician to St George's Hospital and to the Royal Brompton Hospital. He qualified MRCP in 1905 and was elected FRCP in 1912. In 1913 he delivered the Goulstonian Lectures.

During WWI he served as a major in the Royal Army Medical Corps in France and upon his return was appointed a full physician at St George's Hospital. In 1920 he married, resigned all of his London appointments, and moved with his bride to Kenya, where he lived until his death in 1957.

== Family ==
Arthur John Jex-Blake was a son of Rev. Thomas William Jex-Blake, D.D. headmaster of Rugby School from 1874 to 1887 and a nephew of the famous physician and feminist Sophia Jex-Blake. His siblings included Katharine Jex-Blake, Mistress of Girton College from 1916 to 1922; Henrietta Jex-Blake, principal of Lady Margaret Hall from 1909 to 1921; and Bertha Jex-Blake, physician who studied at the Edinburgh College of Medicine for women established by her aunt. Bertha drowned near Whitby in 1915.

On 5 August 1920 in Wilton, Wiltshire, A. J. Jex-Blake married Lady Muriel Katherine Herbert (1883–1951), daughter of Sidney Herbert, 14th Earl of Pembroke.

They owned a coffee plantation named Kyuna where they created a private botanical garden and co-founded the Kenya Horticultural Society (1923). Lady Muriel published on the flora of Kenya including a popular book illustrated by Joy Adamson.

The couple met in Boulogne in WWI when he was a doctor and she was a volunteer nurse. The Jex-Blakes had one daughter, Daphne Marian Jex-Blake (1923–1970); she married Richard Mason.

== Selected publications ==
- Jex-Blake, A. J. (21 January 1911). "A lecture on cardiac arrhythmia, delivered at the Hospital for Consumption, Brompton". Br Med J. 1 (2612): 121–124. doi:10.1136/bmj.1.2612.121. PMC 2332862. PMID 20765409.
- Jex-Blake, A. J. (8 March 1913). "The Goulstonian Lectures on death by electric currents and by lightning, delivered before the Royal College of Physicians of London". Br Med J. 1 (2723): 492–498. doi:10.1136/bmj.1.2723.492. PMC 2298678. PMID 20766541.
- with W. James Wilson: Jex-Blake, A. J.; Wilson, W. J. (21 September 1918). "Notes on three fatal cases of B. aertrycke infection". Br Med J. 2 (3012): 310–312. doi:10.1136/bmj.2.3012.310. PMC 2341846. PMID 20769188. In this paper the case of infection in patient D.H. with B. aertrycke would in current medical terminology be called typhoid fever due to infection by Salmonella enterica serotype Typhi; the case of infection in patient J.A.M. would be called paratyphoid fever due to infection by Salmonella enterica serotype Paratyphi B. The name of the bacterial species was changed. In 1928 medical experts were not entirely sure that B. aertrycke consisted of Salmonella.
- Jex-Blake, A. J. (1 May 1920). "A lecture on bronchiectasis, delivered at the Hospital for Consumption, Brompton, November 19th, 1919". British Medical Journal. 1 (3096): 591–594. doi:10.1136/bmj.1.3096.591. PMC 2337230. PMID 20769874.
- Jex-Blake, A. J. (29 August 1942). "Bee-stings in Kenya Colony". Br Med J. 2 (4260): 241–242. doi:10.1136/bmj.2.4260.241. PMC 2164088. PMID 20784405.
