= Henrietta Jex-Blake =

British violinist

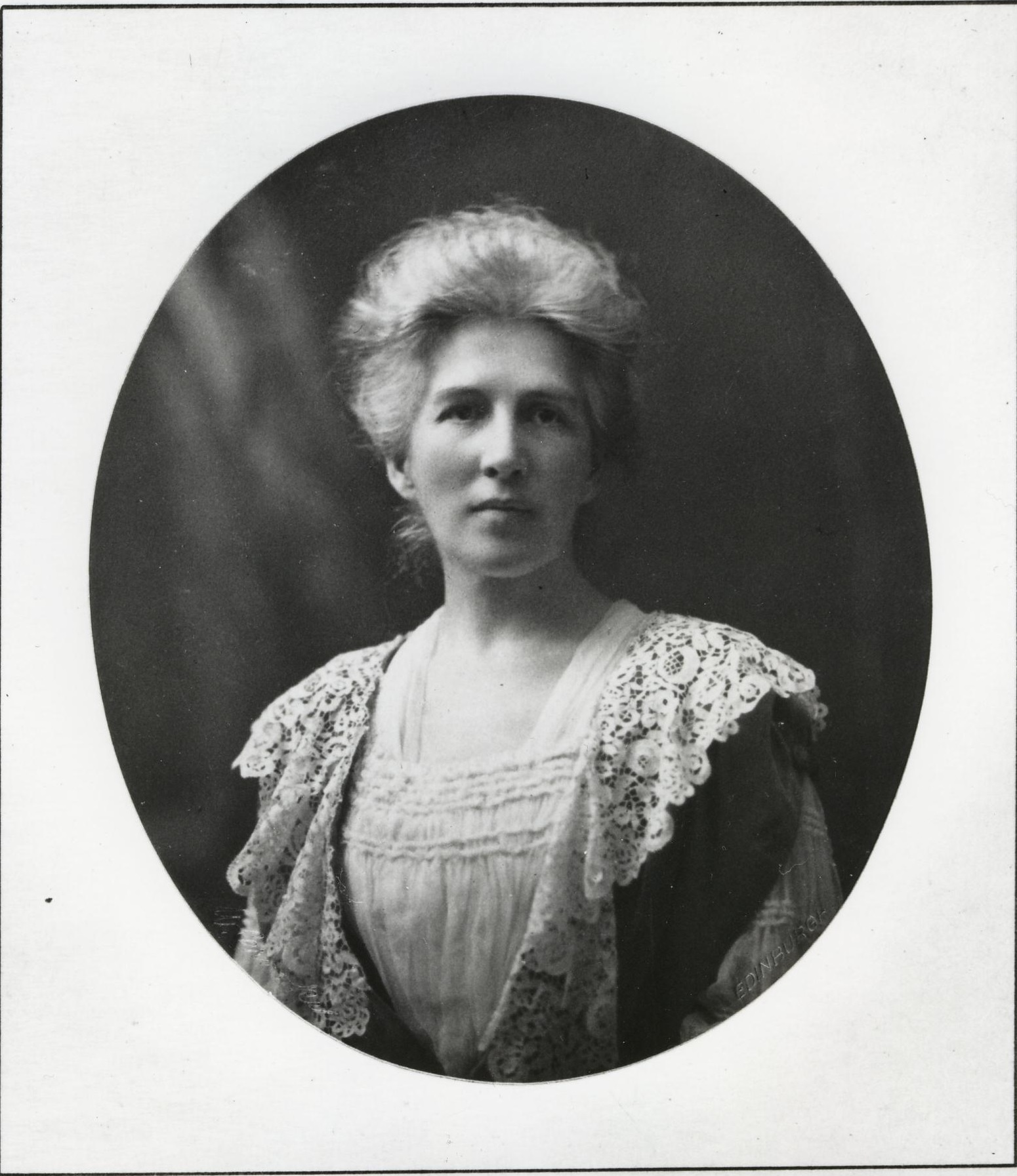

Principal of Lady Margaret Hall, Oxford
- In office 1909–1921
- Preceded by: Elizabeth Wordsworth
- Succeeded by: Lynda Grier

Personal details
- Born: 8 July 1862 Rugby, Warwickshire
- Died: 21 May 1953 (aged 90) Gerrards Cross, Buckinghamshire
- Parents: Thomas Jex-Blake (father); Henrietta Cordery (mother)
- Relatives: Katharine Jex-Blake (sister); Arthur John Jex-Blake (brother); Sophia Jex-Blake (aunt)
- Education: Leipzig Conservatoire
- Musical career
- Instrument: Violin

Henrietta Jex-Blake (8 July 1862 – 21 May 1953) was a British violinist, and the principal of Lady Margaret Hall, Oxford, from 1909 to 1921.

== Early life and education ==
Henrietta Jex-Blake was born at Rugby School on 8 July 1862 to Henrietta (née Cordery) and Rev. Thomas Jex-Blake, Anglican priest and educationalist, headmaster of Rugby School 1874-1887. She was one of nine daughters and two sons. Her siblings included Katharine Jex-Blake, Mistress of Girton College from 1916 to 1922; Bertha Jex-Blake, physician who studied at the Edinburgh College of Medicine for women (who drowned near Whitby in 1915) and Arthur John Jex-Blake. Her paternal aunt Sophia Jex-Blake was the first practising female doctor in Scotland, and a leading campaigner for medical education for women.

She educated at home by masters from Rugby School, as were her sisters. Henrietta Jex-Blake studied music at the Leipzig Conservatoire, Dresden, and in Vienna, and became an accomplished violinist.

== Career ==
Between 1899 and 1909 Jex-Blake was headmistress of St Margaret's School, Polmont, Scotland, originally which was founded by Maud Mary Daniel, her sister Katherine's friend from Girton College, Cambridge. Jex-Blake promoted girls' sports and encouraged her pupils to go to university, particularly to Girton.

In 1909 Jex-Blake became the second principal of Lady Margaret Hall, Oxford, succeeding Elizabeth Wordsworth. Under Jex-Blake's tenure student numbers increased, a number of large building projects were completed, and the college became incorporated under the Companies Act.

Jex-Blake campaigned for degrees to be opened up for women and when women became eligible for degrees at the University of Oxford in 1920, following the passing of the Sex Disqualification (Removal) Act 1919 she presented the first candidate for matriculation and was herself awarded an honorary MA. She was also a supporter of women's suffrage.

== Later life ==
Jex-Blake retired in 1921, she and her sister Katherine travelled together, spending some winters in Italy and in the 1930s found themselves caught up in the Spanish Civil War whilst travelling in Europe. In later years, Henrietta and Katherine Jex-Blake shared a home in Tunbridge Wells.

Henrietta Jex-Blake died at the White House Nursing Home, Gerrards Cross, Buckinghamshire, on 21 May 1953.

== Commemoration ==
The Jex-Blake Graduate Scholarships are named in her honour.
