= Paul Welsh (philosopher) =

American philosopher

- Born: September 11, 1911; Germantown, PA
- Died: August 29, 2004 (aged 92); Durham, NC
- Spouse(s): Ethel Butcher Van Order (1942 - 1984); Kathryn Welsh

Education
- Education: Cornell University (PhD), Bowdoin College (BA)
- Thesis: Dewey's theory of inquiry (1947)

Philosophical work
- Era: 21st-century philosophy
- Region: Western philosophy

Paul Welsh (September 11, 1911 - August 29, 2004) was an American philosopher and professor of philosophy at Duke University. He was a member of Phi Beta Kappa and is known for his works on logic.

== Books ==
- Introduction to logic, Romane Clark and Paul Welsh, D. Van Nostrana Company, Inc., Princeton, N.J., Toronto, New York, London, 1962
- Fact, Value, and Perception: Essays in Honor of Charles A. Baylis, Duke University Press 1975
