= James Sleator =

Irish artist (1885–1950)

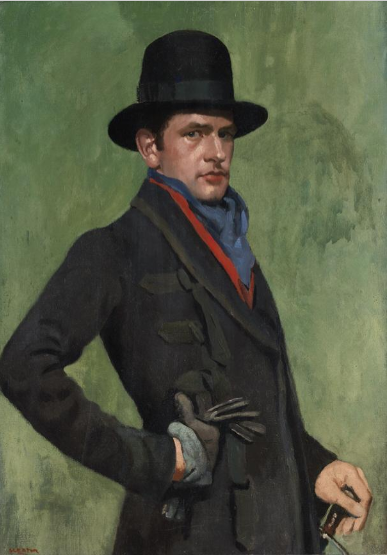
- Born: James Samuel Slator; 27 June 1885; Derrycane, Portadown, County Armagh, Ireland
- Died: 9 January 1950 (aged 64); Dublin, Ireland
- Resting place: Mount Jerome Cemetery, Dublin
- Education: Belfast School of Art, Metropolitan School of Art, Slade School of Art
- Known for: painting

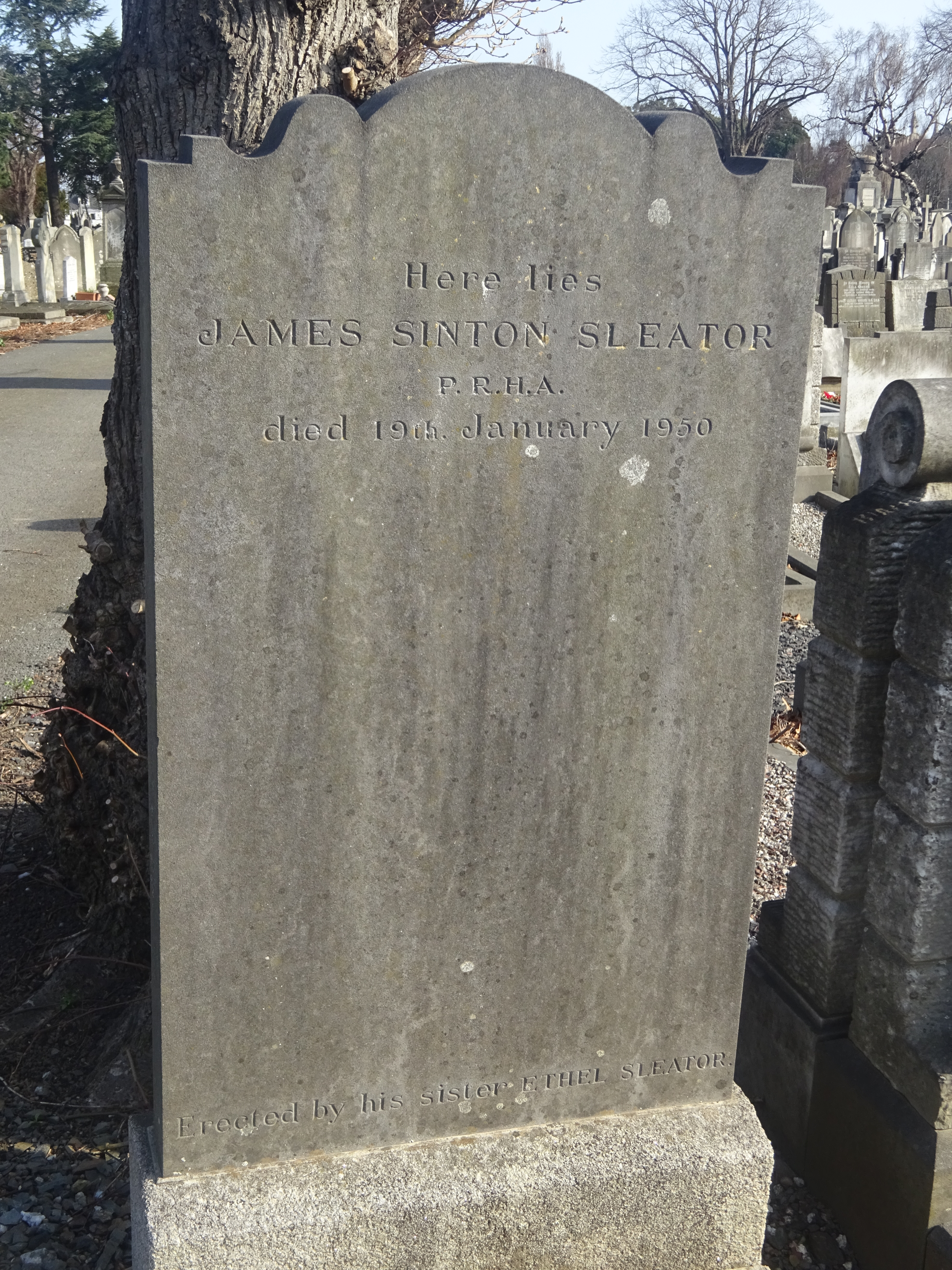
Grave in Mount Jerome

James Sinton Sleator PRHA (27 June 1885 – 9 January 1950), was an Irish artist, born in Portadown, County Armagh, Ireland. He was a painter of portraits and still life.

== Life ==
Sleator was the son of Margaret Slator (born Thompson) and William Slator (different spelling, as James Samuel. His parents were teachers. He changed his last name, along with his middle name from Samuel to Sinton). His father taught at Derryvane National School, near Portadown, and he was later principal of Strandtown National School in Belfast.

The son studied at Belfast School of Art and in 1910 secured a scholarship for study at the Metropolitan School of Art in Dublin, where he was under Sir William Orpen (1878–1931) and he won several prizes. Continuing his studies at the Slade School of Art, London, from there he went to Paris. He returned to Dublin in 1915 to become a teacher at the metropolitan. He was elected an Associate of the Royal Hibernian Academy in 1917, and he became a member in the same year. Five years later he went to Florence when he painted portraits and landscapes, finally returning to London where he set up a studio (1927) as a portrait painter and where he was closely associated with William Orpen. Sleator was a member of the Chelsea Arts Club and exhibited at the Royal Academy and with the Royal Society of Portrait Painters. He taught painting to Winston Churchill, taking over the job from Orpen. In 1935 he was made an honorary member of the Ulster Arts Club, Belfast. He kept in touch with his sister Ethel Slator in Belfast and visited her and his friends. He returned from London to Dublin in 1941 and, apart from an occasional journey abroad, remained there until his death (1950), where he was buried.

== Works ==
Girton College has his portrait of Edith Major.

In the Ulster Museum is a portrait of Forrest Reid. The Armagh County Museum and the National Gallery of Ireland, Dublin, have self-portraits. In 1951 a memorial exhibition at the Victor Waddington Galleries, Dublin was opened by Ulster playwright, Rutherford Mayne.
