= Constance Jones =

English philosopher and educator

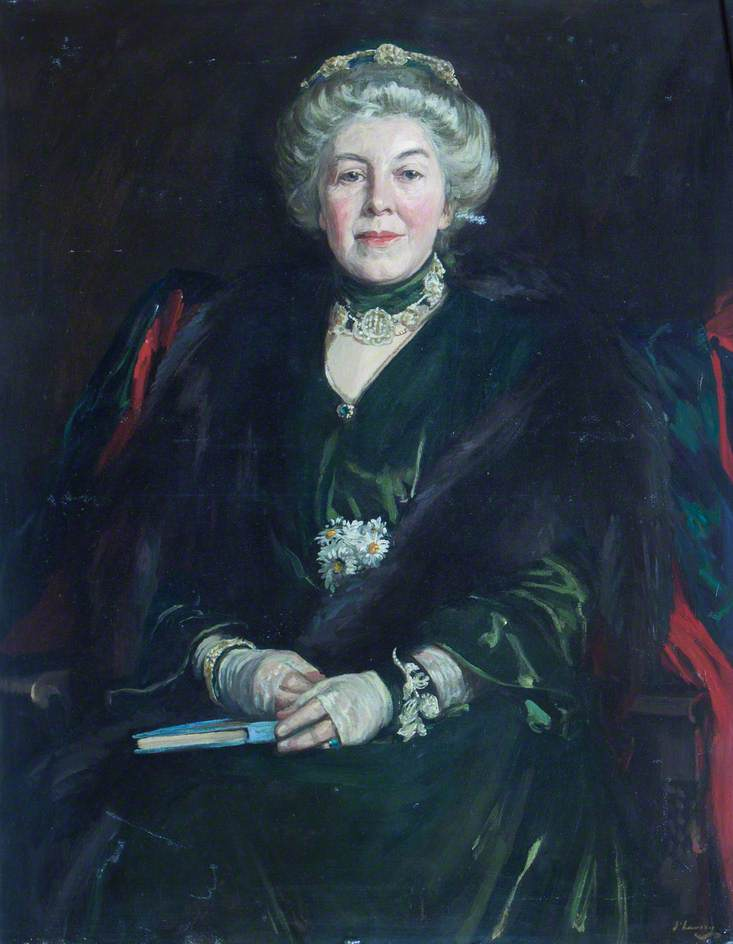
- Emily Elizabeth Constance Jones, portrait by John Lavery
- Born: Emily Elizabeth Constance Jones; February 19, 1848; Llangarron, Herefordshire, England
- Died: April 9, 1922 (aged 74); Weston-super-Mare, Somerset, England
- Education: Girton College, Cambridge
- Occupations: Philosopher, educator
- Employer(s): Girton College, Cambridge

Emily Elizabeth Constance Jones (19 February 1848 – 9 April 1922), better known as Constance Jones or E. E. Constance Jones, was an English philosopher and educator. She worked in logic and ethics and served as mistress of Girton College, Cambridge from 1903 to 1916.

== Life and career ==
Emily Elizabeth Constance Jones was born at Langstone Court, Llangarron, Herefordshire, to John Jones and his wife, Emily, daughter of Thomas Oakley JP, of Monmouthshire. She was the eldest of ten children. Constance was mostly tutored at home. She spent her early teenage years with her family in Cape Town, South Africa, and when they returned to England in 1865 she attended a small school, Miss Robinson's, in Cheltenham, for a year.

She was coached for the entrance examination for Girton College, Cambridge by Miss Alice Grüner, a former student of Newnham College at her home in Sydenham, Kent. She went up to Girton in 1875 where, prompted by having read Henry Fawcett's Political Economy (1863) and Mill's A System of Logic (1843), she chose the Moral Sciences Tripos. However, she almost immediately had to withdraw in order to look after the aunt with whom she then lived. Her undergraduate career was considerably interrupted because the education of her younger brothers took precedence over her own, but despite this in 1880 she was awarded a first class in the Moral Sciences Tripos.

She returned to Girton in 1884 as a research student and a resident lecturer in Moral Sciences. Having studied with Henry Sidgwick, James Ward and J. N. Keynes, she completed the translation of Lotze's Mikrokosmus initiated by Elizabeth Hamilton. She also edited Henry Sidgwick's Methods of Ethics (1901) and his Ethics of Green, Spencer, and Martineau (1902); and wrote Elements of Logic (1890); A Primer of Logic (1905); A Primer of Ethics (1909); A New Law of Thought and its Logical Bearing (1911); Girton College (1913). She was Mistress of Girton College, Cambridge, from 1903 until her retirement in 1916.

Jones was one of the first women to join the Aristotelian Society in 1892, serving on the Society's executive committee from 1914 to 1916. She was also the first woman recorded as having delivered a paper to the Cambridge University Moral Sciences Club. She spoke about James Ward's Naturalism and Agnosticism on 1 December 1899, with the philosopher Henry Sidgwick chairing the meeting. Her views were regarded as original and influenced her colleagues. She spent her career developing the idea that categorical propositions are composed of a predicate and a subject related via identity or non-identity.

== Philosophy ==
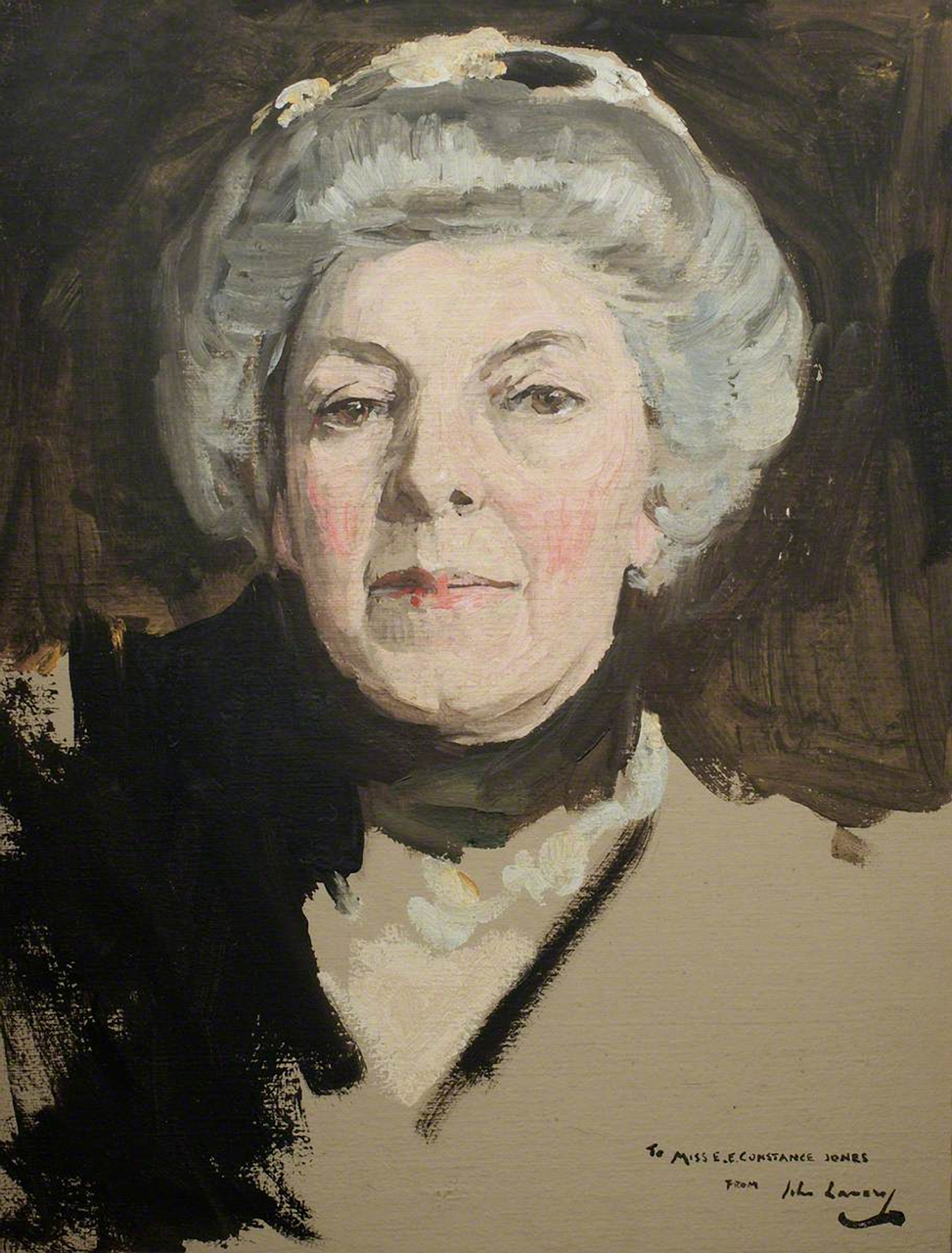
Constance Jones (1848-1922) by John Lavery in Aberystwyth University School of Art Museum and Galleries collection

Constance Jones' most significant contribution to philosophy was in logic and she was widely regarded to be an authority in this area by her contemporaries. Her major work is A New Law of Thought and its Logical Bearings (Cambridge, 1911). She was chiefly concerned with the import and interpretation of propositions. G.F. Stout says of her: "She did good service in insisting on the distinction between interpretation from the point of view of the speaker and that of the hearer". In her autobiography, Jones wrote of an early fascination with issues related to the nature and structure of content: "This unsettled question—what is asserted when you make a statement, and what is the proper form of statement?—had deeply interested me from the time when I was a student and puzzled over Mill's and Jevons' accounts of propositions." Jones published several textbooks on logic and numerous articles on logic and ethics, particularly on Sidgwick's ethical hedonism. However, despite her contribution to analytic philosophy she has become largely forgotten.

== Sources ==
Academic offices
Preceded by Elizabeth Welsh	Mistress of Girton College, Cambridge; 1903–1916	Succeeded by Katharine Jex-Blake
