= List of mistresses of Girton College, Cambridge =

This is a list of Mistresses of Girton College, Cambridge.

- 1869 Charlotte Manning
- 1870 Emily Anne Eliza Shirreff
- 1870–1872 Annie Austin
- 1872–1875 Emily Davies
- 1875–1884 Marianne Bernard
- 1885–1903 Elizabeth Welsh
- 1903–1916 Emily Elizabeth Constance Jones
- 1916–1922 Katharine Jex-Blake
- 1922–1925 Bertha Surtees Phillpotts
- 1925–1931 Edith Helen Major
- 1931–1942 Helen Marion Wodehouse
- 1942–1949 Kathleen Teresa Blake Butler
- 1949–1968 Mary Cartwright
- 1968–1976 Muriel Clara Bradbrook
- 1976–1983 Brenda Ryman
- 1984–1991 Mary Warnock
- 1992–1998 Juliet Campbell
- 1998–2009 Marilyn Strathern
- 2009–2022 Susan J. Smith
- 2022 to date Elisabeth Kendall
