= Kathleen Butler-Hopkins =

American violinist

- Education: Juilliard School; Yale University
- Occupation(s): Violinist, educator
- Musical career
- Instrument: Violin
- Formerly of: Alaska Trio, the Alaska Chamber Ensemble, the Alaska Chamber Players

Kathleen Butler-Hopkins is an American violinist and Professor Emerita of Violin, Viola, and Chamber Music at University of Alaska Fairbanks (UAF).

== Education ==
Butler-Hopkins holds a Doctor of Musical Arts degree from Yale University School of Music, where she was a student of Broadus Erle, Syoko Aki and Joseph Silverstein, former concertmaster of the Boston Symphony Orchestra. She received both the Bachelor and Master of Music degrees from the Juilliard School and has attended the Curtis Institute of Music in Philadelphia. Butler-Hopkins has studied chamber music with Gilbert Kalish, Gunther Schuller, and members of the Juilliard, Guarneri, Tokyo, and Budapest String Quartets, and received a summer stipend from the National Endowment for the Humanities to study the string quartets of Ludwig van Beethoven with Lewis Lockwood at Harvard University. Under the auspices of the Fulbright-Hays Fellowship Program, she completed a year of study with Professor Wolfgang Schneiderhan at Vienna State Academy, Austria.

== Career ==
Since joining the faculty of UAF, Butler-Hopkins has served as concertmaster and soloist with the Fairbanks Symphony and the Arctic Chamber Orchestra, and as a member of the Alaska Trio, the Alaska Chamber Ensemble, and the Alaska Chamber Players. She has performed as concertmaster for orchestras with the Western Opera Theater, the Fairbanks Light Opera Theatre, and the Fairbanks Choral Arts Orchestra. Butler-Hopkins has been on the faculty of the UAF Summer Fine Arts Camp, is the master teacher at the Juneau Jazz and Classics String Workshop, is the chamber music coordinator at the Fairbanks Suzuki Institute, and the String Symposium.

== Awards and honors ==
Butler-Hopkins received the UAF College of Liberal Arts Excellence in Teaching Award for 1999, was named 1999 String Teacher of the Year by the Alaska String Teachers Association, and is the 2003 recipient of the prestigious Usibelli Distinguished Service Award.
