= Kathleen Butler (linguist) =

English scholar of Italian (1883-1950), Mistress of Girton

- Born: 26 September 1883; Bardsea, United Kingdom
- Died: 2 May 1950 (aged 66); Cambridge, United Kingdom

Academic background
- Education: University of Cambridge (MA)

Academic work
- Discipline: Modern languages
- Sub-discipline: French, Italian
- Institutions: University of Cambridge

Kathleen Teresa Blake Butler (born Bardsea, 26 September 1883 – died Cambridge, 2 May 1950) was an academic specialising in Modern Languages.

Butler was educated at Newnham College, Cambridge. She was on the staff of the Royal Holloway College from 1913 to 1915 when she returned to Cambridge as a Fellow of Girton. She was a Lecturer in Modern Languages from 1915 to 1942; Director of Studies in Modern Languages from 1917 to 1938; University Lecturer in Italian from 1926 to 1949; Vice-Mistress of Girton from 1936 to 38; and Mistress of Girton from 1942 to 1949. Her publications included "A History of French Literature" (1923); "Les Premières Lettres de Guez de Balzac" (1934); and "Tredici novelle modern" (1946). Her sister, Eliza Marian Butler, was an academic specialising in the German language.
