= Brenda Ryman =

Biochemist and Mistress of Girton College, Cambridge

Brenda Edith Ryman (married name Barkley, 6 December 1922 – 20 November 1983) was a biochemist and Mistress of Girton College, Cambridge. Ryman was on the staff of the Royal Free Hospital from 1948 to 1972, Professor of Biochemistry at Charing Cross Hospital from 1972, and Mistress of Girton College, Cambridge from 1976 until her death. She was awarded a posthumous DSc by Cambridge University.

== Life ==
Brenda Edith Ryman was born on 6 December 1922. Ryman was educated at Colston's Girls' School in Bristol and then attended Girton College, Cambridge, where she earned a Bachelor of Arts and then in 1943 a Master of Arts. Ryman was awarded the Gamble Prize by the College. She completed a doctoral degree in biochemistry at the University of Birmingham in 1948. Ryman married Dr Harry Barkley in 1948.

Ryman was a biochemist, and was on the staff of the Royal Free Hospital from 1948 to 1972, first as a senior lecturer and then from 1970 as a Reader. From 1972 she was appointed as Professor of Biochemistry at Charing Cross Hospital. Ryman published more than ninety papers, and was particularly interested in liposomes and their therapeutic applications.

Ryman was Mistress of Girton College, Cambridge from 1976 until her death. At the time she was appointed, the college was transitioning from a women's college to a mixed college, and Ryman oversaw this significant change to the student body. Ryman's husband died in 1978, and she died of cancer on 20 November 1983. The University of Cambridge awarded her a DSc posthumously.
