= Katharine Jex-Blake =

English classical scholar

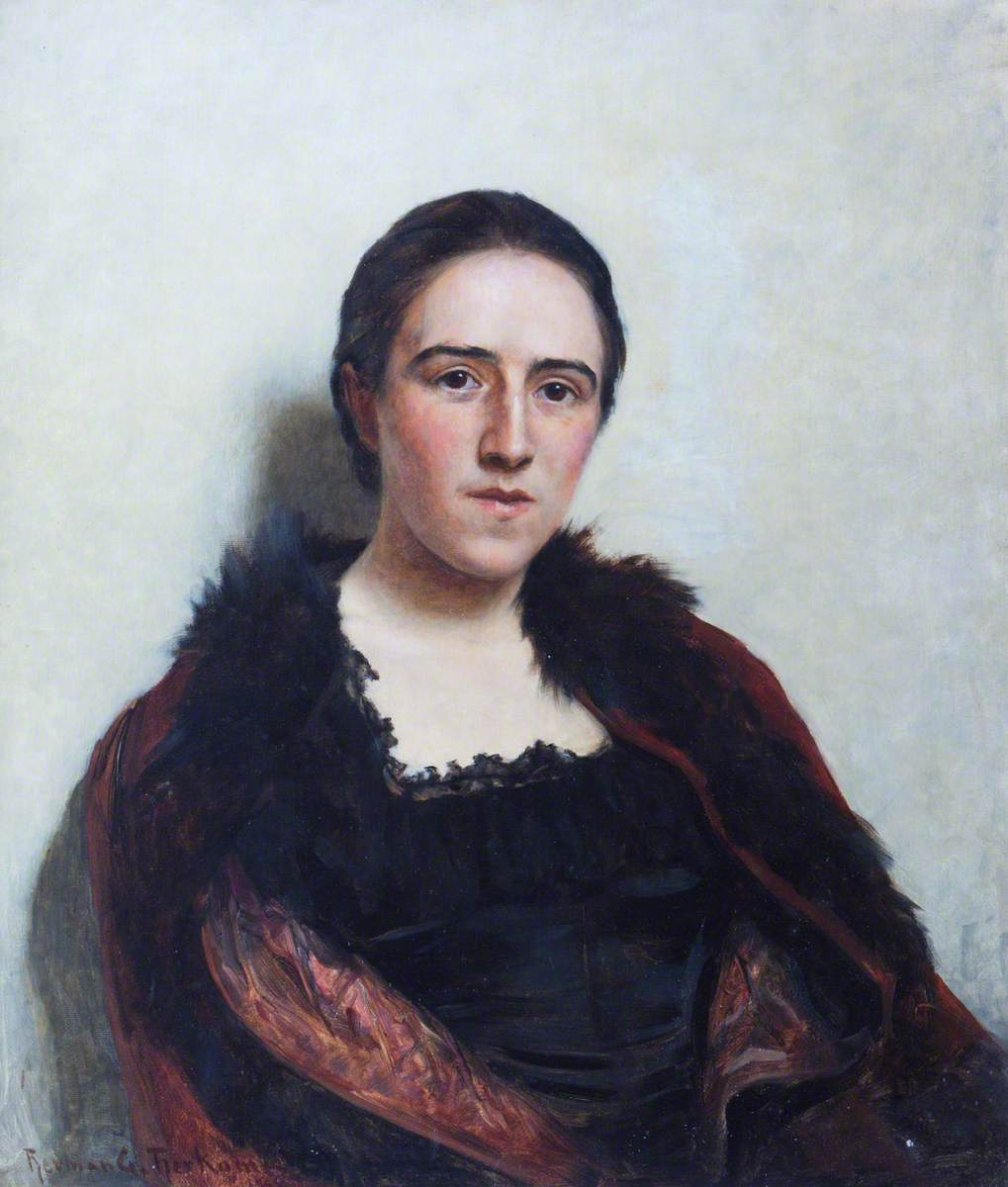
- Portrait of Katharine Jex-Blake by Herman Herkomer

Mistress of Girton College, Cambridge
- In office 1916–1922
- Preceded by: Constance Jones
- Succeeded by: Bertha Phillpotts

Personal details
- Born: 18 November 1860 Rugby, Warwickshire
- Died: 26 March 1951 (aged 90) Hurstpierpoint, Sussex
- Parents: Thomas Jex-Blake (father); Henrietta Cordery (mother)
- Relatives: Henrietta Jex-Blake (sister); Arthur John Jex-Blake (brother); Sophia Jex-Blake (aunt)
- Education: Girton College, Cambridge
- Occupation: Lecturer; teacher

Katharine Jex-Blake (18 November 1860 – 26 March 1951), was an English classical scholar, and the eighth Mistress of Girton College, Cambridge.

== Biography ==
=== Early life ===
Katharine Jex-Blake was born in 1860 at Rugby School, one of nine daughters and two sons of Thomas Jex-Blake (1832–1915), the school master and later head master at Rugby school, later the Dean of Wells, and his wife Henrietta Cordery. Her aunt was Sophia Jex-Blake, a pioneer in the fight for women's access to higher education; her sister, Henrietta Jex-Blake, would go on to be Principal of Lady Margaret Hall in Oxford. Jex-Blake was educated at home with her sisters by masters from Rugby School before reading classics at Girton College, Cambridge, 1879–1883. Although the passing of the so-called Three Graces in 1881 meant women were permitted to formally sit University exams from 1882, Jex-Blake was not considered a full member of the university and was thus not eligible for a degree. She was ranked in the third division of the first class in Part I of the Classical Tripos for women in 1882, one of the two highest performing female candidates. In Part II of the Classical Tripos, which allowed specialisation in particular sub-disciplines such as archaeology and philosophy rather than focusing on linguistic competence as in Part I, Jex-Blake was the only woman to be placed in the third class.

=== Career ===
After leaving Girton, she taught for a year at Notting Hill and Bayswater High School, a school owned by the Girls' Public Day School Trust. In 1885 she returned to Girton as the Resident Classics lecturer, later becoming the Director of Studies in Classics from 1901 to 1919 and Vice-Mistress from 1903 to 1916. She was elected as Girton's correspondent for the newly established Classical Association and was in that role by June 1906.

Jex-Blake was appointed as Mistress of the college in 1916 and served until 1922. She was thus responsible for steering the college through the changes and challenges of the First World War, including the introduction of rationing and raising vegetables and pigs on college land. As Mistress, she laid the groundwork for the college to be recognised in law, leading the college council in preparing a draft constitution and statues in order to obtain a royal charter.

Although Jex-Blake was an active teacher and scholar, in line with the academic norms of this period she did not publish extensively. Her only published work was a translation of Pliny the Elder's Chapters on the History of Art, produced in collaboration with her friend Eugenie Sellers (1896); Jex-Blake provided the translation, while Sellars wrote the introduction and the commentary.

Her influence extended beyond Girton: some of her students became classics lecturers at Girton, Newnham College, Bedford College, Royal Holloway, Somerville College and Lady Margaret Hall in the 1920s.

=== Politics ===
Jex-Blake was an active supporter of women's suffrage, signing a joint letter to The Times in 1917 objecting to the failure of the Electoral Reform Conference to address the issue.

=== Retirement ===
Upon her retirement from Girton in 1922, Katharine Jex-Blake donated a sum for what became the Jex-Blake Research Fellowship. She became a governor of the college and also sat on its Council. She was made an honorary fellow in 1932. From 1925 to 1937 she was an active member of the Council of her former employers, the Girls' Public Day School Trust and was later elected a vice-president of the Trust. She also served as a governor of the Harpur Trust at Bedford High School and at the Perse School.

She died at Hurstpierpoint, Sussex in 1951.

== Works ==
- Eugenie Sellers, Commentary and Historical Introduction to the Elder Pliny's Chapter on the History of Art. Translated by Katharine Jex-Blake (London, 1896).

== Personal papers ==
Norfolk Record Office holds correspondence between Katharine and her sisters, Henrietta and Violet Jex-Blake, in the papers of the Jex-Blake family (Ref: MC 233/36).

Jex-Blake's personal papers are held at Girton College, and much of her correspondence is distributed around other colleges' archives at Cambridge.

Academic offices
| Preceded by Emily Elizabeth Constance Jones | Mistress of Girton College, Cambridge; 1916–1922 | Succeeded by Bertha Surtees Phillpotts |
