= Thomas Jex-Blake =

Anglican priest and educationalist

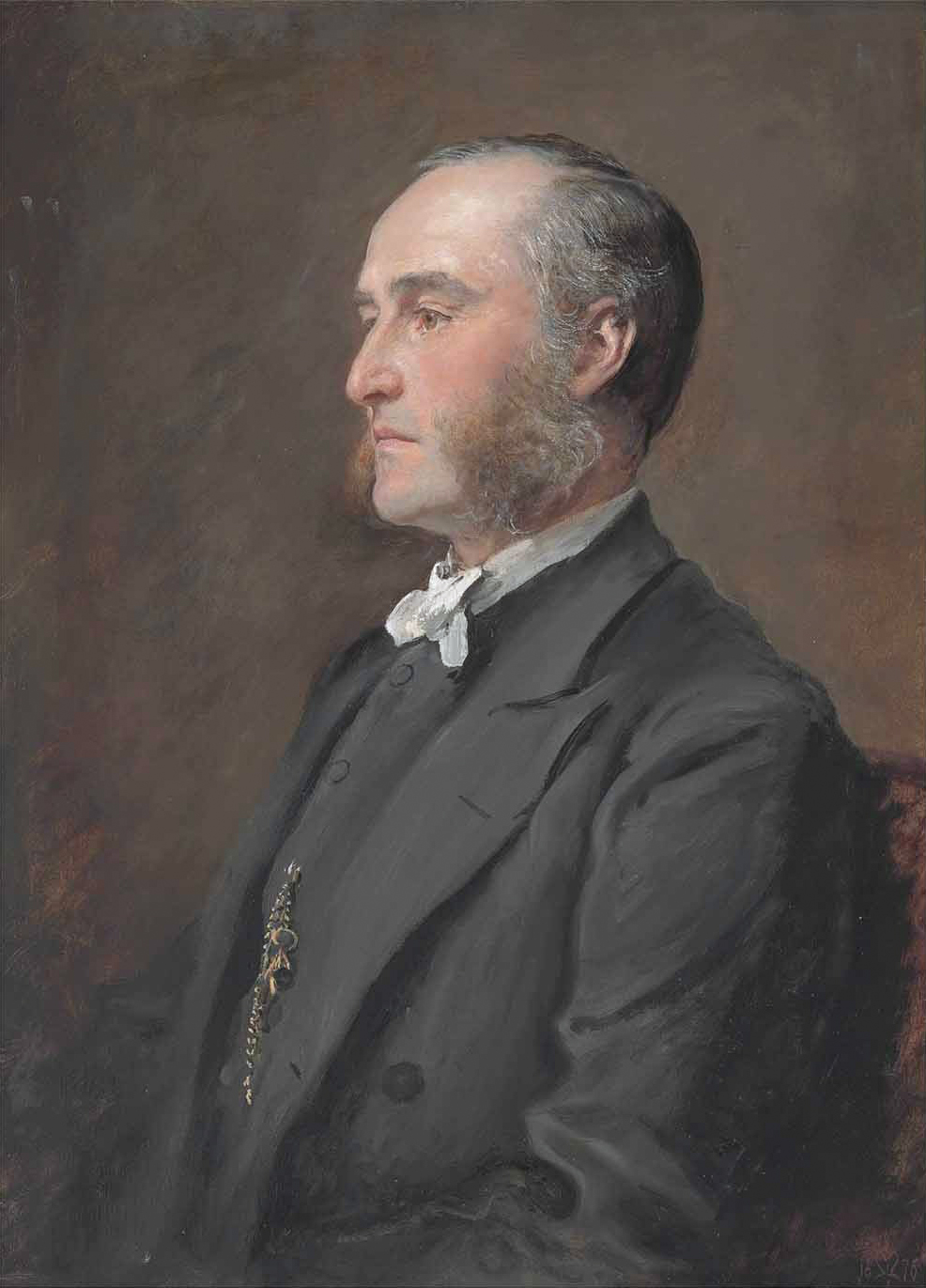
Thomas Jex-Blake (John Everett Millais, 1875)

Thomas William Jex-Blake (1832–1915) was an Anglican priest and educationalist.

He was born on 26 January 1832, the son of lawyer Thomas Jex-Blake and the brother of Sophia Jex-Blake, who was a pioneer in women doctors in the United Kingdom. He was educated at Rugby and University College, Oxford. He was also a fellow of Queen's College, Oxford.

His career in education began with a school master position at Marlborough, which he left to become assistant master at Rugby. From 1868 to 1874 he was principal of Cheltenham College and from 1874 to 1887 headmaster of Rugby.

After this second period at Rugby, his working life solely as an Anglican minister began when he became rector of Alvechurch. In 1891 he was appointed dean of Wells, a post he held for two decades.

He died on 2 July 1915.

== Personal life ==
He married Henrietta Cordery in 1857. They had nine daughters and two sons, among them educationalists Katharine Jex-Blake and Henrietta Jex-Blake, and doctors Bertha Jex-Blake and Arthur John Jex-Blake.

Church of England titles
| Preceded by Edward Plumptre | Dean of Wells; 1891–1911 | Succeeded by Armitage Robinson |
