= Master of Arts (Oxford, Cambridge and Dublin) =

Academic title or rank

In the universities of Oxford, Cambridge, and Dublin, recipients of the Bachelor of Arts (BA) degree may, upon application, be promoted to the degree of Master of Arts (MA). This promotion requires only the passage of a specified period of time and does not involve any further examination or study. The newly conferred degree is regarded as a mark of seniority rather than an additional postgraduate qualification. The postnominal letters "MA" are followed by the abbreviated Latin name of the conferring university: Oxon (Oxford), Cantab (Cambridge), or Dubl (Dublin).

In addition, under the principle of ad eundem gradum, graduates of the universities of Oxford, Cambridge, and Dublin may use a process called "incorporation" to be granted equivalent academic degrees at either of the other two universities, provided that they wish to register for a separate higher degree at that university or are members of the academic staff, and that the required fee is paid. One of the most frequently cited examples of incorporation is that of the steamboat ladies – approximately 720 women graduates of Oxford and Cambridge who were awarded Dublin degrees. Although not earned through further study, both the original degree(s) and any incorporated ad eundem degree(s) may be listed as post-nominals in the Oxford University Calendar.

This promotion may take place no earlier than seven years after starting one's degree at Oxford, six years after starting the degree at Cambridge, and three years after graduation at Dublin. While these three universities also award postgraduate master's degrees that require further study, they do not use the title "MA" for any taught or examined postgraduate qualification. This practice differs from that of most universities worldwide, where the Master of Arts degree denotes postgraduate study. Consequently, the degrees are often referred to as the Oxford and Cambridge MA, and the Dublin or Trinity MA, in order to distinguish them. This system has at times caused confusion among employers, who may mistakenly regard the promoted MA as an additional academic qualification. Similarly, while a MPhil at other universities would suggest a longer research-focused postgraduate degree, such a degree is awarded to graduates of shorter, mostly taught postgraduate programmes at Cambridge, Dublin and Oxford, adding to the possible confusion.

== History and rationale ==
This system dates back to the Middle Ages, when the study of the liberal arts typically took seven years. At that time, students often entered universities at a much younger age than is common today, sometimes as young as 13 or 14. The basic university education comprised the Trivium (grammar, rhetoric, and dialectic) and the Quadrivium (geometry, arithmetic, astronomy, and music), which together took about seven years of full-time study.

During this period, a student would first earn a baccalaureate, or bachelor's degree, after completing part of his studies. The division between the trivium and quadrivium did not always correspond to the division between the BA and MA degrees, though it was adopted at Cambridge during the Tudor period and remained in place long after other European universities had moved away from it. At the University of Paris, the baccalaureate was awarded soon after responsions (the matriculation exam), while at Oxford and Cambridge the BA degree was granted much later and became more significant over time.

Upon being admitted to the degree of Master of Arts, a student would become a full member of the university and gain the right to vote in the Convocation. The new MA could then teach at the university for a set number of years, during which time they were referred to as a "regent" or "regent master". Upon completing this period of teaching, they would become a "non-regent master" and either leave the university or remain to pursue further studies in one of the higher faculties – Divinity, Canon or Civil Law, or Medicine.

Over time, it became possible to study in these higher faculties as a BA, although a graduate could not be promoted to a higher degree until they had the seniority required to become an MA. As the requirements for the BA degree increased, the requirements for the MA degree gradually diminished. By the 18th century, the practice had largely become a formality, and students could meet residency requirements (once fulfilled by attending lectures) simply by keeping their names on the college books. In 1800, Oxford introduced modern-style examinations for the BA and MA degrees, but the MA degree examination was abolished in 1807.

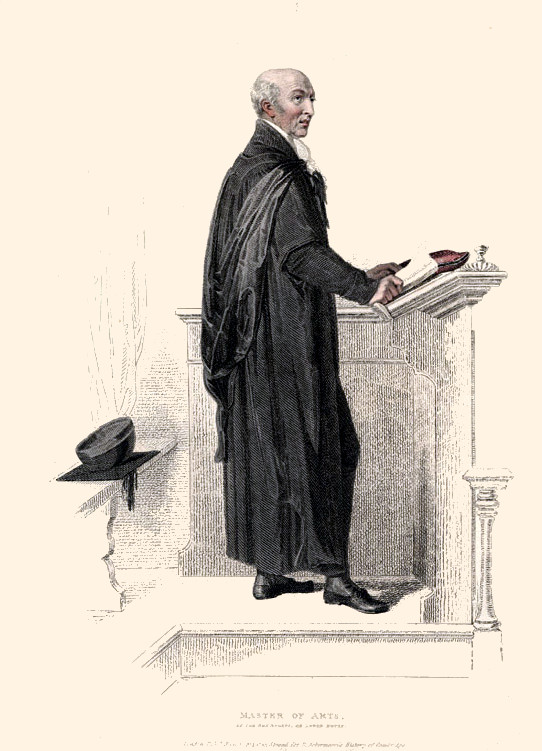
Costume of a non-regent MA in Cambridge, 1815.

From at least the 16th century, noblemen formed the most select group of undergraduates, paying four times the normal fees and sometimes receiving an MA degree after just two years of residence, without completing the BA degree. However, many did not stay long enough to graduate. Noblemen were distinguished by gold tassels on their mortarboard caps, compared to the black ones worn by students of lower social ranks. Students of the next rank – fellow-commoners at Cambridge and Dublin or gentlemen commoners at Oxford – paid twice the standard fees, dined with the fellows, and were exempt from attending lectures and performing exercises required for the BA degree. They could graduate a year earlier than students in lower ranks. However, at Cambridge, both higher categories were still required to take the Senate House Examination to receive an honours degree. Below these were commoners at Oxford or pensioners at Cambridge and Dublin, who paid the standard fees and were more likely to remain and graduate. At the bottom were servitors at Oxford and sizars at Cambridge and Dublin, who had their fees subsidized by the college in exchange for menial duties. Oliver Goldsmith was a sizar; Isaac Newton was a subsizar. These distinctions were gradually phased out during the 19th century.

Reforms in the late 16th century allowed some ordinary undergraduates to bypass the BA degree stage altogether. Previously, it was necessary to wait three years after earning a BA degree to become a bachelor of laws or medicine, but after paying a fine, students could leave college after three years of residence to study at the Inns of Court or a teaching hospital, and return for a professional bachelor's degree, as was the case with William Blackstone.

Until 1865, all students at King's College, Cambridge, were from Eton College and could graduate BA and later MA without taking university exams. Similarly, students at New College, Oxford, who all came from Winchester College, had the same exemptions until 1834.

Although the length of undergraduate degree programs has been reduced to three or four years in all subjects, the MA degree at Oxford, Cambridge, and Dublin is still awarded roughly seven years after matriculation. This reflects the fact that much of the liberal arts education has been transferred to grammar schools, with students now entering university at an older age, typically between 17 and 19. (In France, the school-leaving certificate is still called the baccalauréat.)

Durham University (which awarded its first MA degree in 1838) and the University of London (first MA degree awarded in 1840) broke away from the ancient English model by treating the MA degree as a distinct higher degree, awarded after further examination. However, by instituting further study beyond the initial baccalaureate, these universities can be seen to have reverted to the ancient model. Most modern universities followed their lead, with the Oxford, Cambridge, and Dublin system becoming the exception. Some universities adopted the ancient model temporarily, allowing progression within the same faculty, such as from BSc to MSc, but later switched to the newer system.

Among the "steamboat ladies" (female students at Oxford and Cambridge who were awarded ad eundem degrees by the University of Dublin between 1904 and 1907, at a time when their own universities refused to confer degrees upon women), some, such as Julia Bell, earned MA degrees.

=== Historical examples at other universities ===
While today only Cambridge, Oxford, and Trinity College, Dublin, promote students to the degree of Master of Arts three years after graduation, this was a practice at other colleges before the 20th century.

Although Durham University recognised the MA degree as a higher degree, its regulation, at least until the 1940s, stipulates that Bachelor of Arts may be admitted to the degree of Master of Arts without further examination provided that they have been placed in the first or second class in the Final Honours Examination for the degree of Bachelor of Arts of nine terms' standing (three years), or six terms' (two years) standing of Bachelor of Architecture. The regulation also states that Bachelor of Arts, having passed examination of other Bachelor's degree of the university except Music or a Diploma in Theology may also be admitted an MA without further studies and examination.

In the United States, Harvard University engaged in this practice from the mid-1600s until 1872. At Yale University, an MA degree without examination was an award from its foundation until 1871. Likewise, Columbia University awarded the Master of Arts degree in this manner from its origins as King's College, during which, in 1761, three of the five members of the original graduating class of 1758 were promoted to Master of Arts. The practice was abolished by the Board of Trustees in June 1880, when a formal exam for the Master of Arts degree was introduced.

Other American colleges, during the mid to late 1800s, awarded a Master of Arts degree "in course" to graduates of three years standing, including at Amherst College, Dartmouth College and Union College. As late as 1882, the Master of Arts degree in the United States was described as "a meaningless record of the circumstance that a graduate survived graduation three years and visited his College at the close of this period."

== Requirements ==
At Oxford, Cambridge, and Dublin, a Bachelor of Arts graduate may "incept" as a Master of Arts after a certain period, without further examination or residence but sometimes upon payment of a fee.

- At Oxford, the MA degree can be conferred after the twenty-first term following matriculation (typically seven years after entering the university) upon holders of an Oxford BA or Bachelor of Fine Arts (BFA) degree. Holders of other undergraduate Oxford degrees, such as Bachelor of Theology or Master of Mathematics, are not entitled to the MA degree.
- At Cambridge, the MA degree may be conferred six years after the first term in residence upon holders of a Cambridge BA degree. The previous rule that the BA degree must be held for two years before applying for the MA degree was suspended for many due to delays caused by the COVID-19 pandemic. The MA can also be awarded to senior university or college staff after three years of employment.
- At Dublin, the MA degree may be conferred on holders of a Dublin BA degree after three years, provided they have completed at least nine terms of residence. A fee is payable, though it is waived for graduates of more than fifty years' standing.

There are other situations in which the MA degree may be awarded, such as to members of staff, but these are the most common. Specific regulations can be found in the statutes of the respective universities.

In accordance with the formula of ad eundem gradum, a form of mutual recognition among the three universities, a graduate entitled to an MA degree from one institution may have the equivalent title conferred by one of the other two without further examination.

== Post-nominal style ==
Masters of Arts of the three universities may use the post-nominal letters "MA". Although honours are sometimes awarded for the examinations leading to the BA degree, the style "MA (Hons)" is not used. The Latin abbreviation of the university (Oxon, Cantab or Dubl) is often appended in brackets e.g. "John Smith, MA (Cantab)". Additionally, the BA degree is not shown alongside the MA degree award; only the MA degree should be used.

If someone incorporates from one of the above universities to another, the Latin et can be inserted between the university names, e.g. "MA (Oxon et Cantab)", etc. as opposed to "MA (Oxon), MA (Cantab)" which would indicate that the holder graduated MA at both universities.

The Oxford University Gazette and University Calendar have, since 2007, used Oxf rather than Oxon (also Camb rather than Cantab and Dub rather than Dubl) to match the style used for other universities.

== Rights and privileges ==
The degree of Master of Arts traditionally carried various rights and privileges, the chief of which was membership of the legislative bodies of the universities – Convocation at Oxford and the Senate at Cambridge and Dublin. These were originally important decision-making bodies, approving changes to the statutes of the universities and electing various officials, including the two members of Parliament for each university. Inception to the MA degree was the principal way of becoming a member of these bodies, though it is not the only way, e.g. at Oxford Doctors of Divinity, Medicine and Civil Law were always also automatically members of Convocation. Today, the main role of Convocation and Senate is the election of the Chancellor of each university as well as the Professor of Poetry at Oxford and the High Steward at Cambridge.

The privileges accorded to MAs and other members of Convocation/Senate were formerly very important. At Oxford, until 1998 the Proctors only had the power to discipline "junior members" (those who had not been admitted to membership of Convocation), which meant that any graduate student who had incepted as an MA was immune from their authority. At Cambridge, MAs and those with MA status continue to be exempt from the rules governing the ownership of motor vehicles by students. Other privileges intended for academic staff and alumni, e.g. the right to dine at High Table, to attend Gaudies, to walk upon college lawns, etc., are in most colleges restricted to MAs, which excludes the majority of graduate students.

For Cambridge, membership of the Senate is no longer limited to the MA degree and in 2000, Oxford opened membership of Convocation to all graduates.

For Dublin, the right to elect senators to the upper house of the Irish parliament, Seanad Éireann, is now restricted to those who are Irish citizens and since 1918 the franchise was extended to include all graduates, not only those with an MA degree.

== Precedence ==
The MA degree gives its holder a particular status in the universities' orders of precedence/seniority. In the University of Oxford, a Master of Arts enjoys precedence, standing, and rank before all doctors, masters, and bachelors of the university who are not Masters of Arts, apart from Doctors of Divinity and Doctors of Civil Law. Precedence, standing, and rank were formerly important for determining eligibility for appointments such as fellowships, but now generally have only a ceremonial significance.

== MA status ==
In Oxford, until 2000 the university statutes required that all members of Congregation (the academic and senior staff of the university) have at least the degree of DD, DM, DCL or MA or have MA status. This linked back to the MA as the licence to teach in the university. MA status was thus routinely granted to academics from other universities who came to take up positions within the university; while it is no longer granted in this way, many members of Congregation appointed before 2000 retain MA status.

In Cambridge, the status of MA is automatically accorded to graduates of other universities studying in Cambridge who are aged 24 or older (graduate students under 24 years are given BA status). This entitles them to wear the appropriate Cambridge gown, but without strings.

For the above cases, the status is not a degree so is automatically relinquished upon leaving the University (in the case of Oxford) or completion of their degree (for Cambridge).

== Criticism ==
In 2000, research by the Quality Assurance Agency for Higher Education showed that 62% of employers were unaware that the Cambridge MA did not represent any kind of postgraduate achievement involving study. The same survey found widespread ignorance amongst employers regarding university-level qualifications in general: 51% believed the Edinburgh MA to be a postgraduate qualification, 22% were unaware that a Doctorate in Business Administration was a higher qualification than an undergraduate Diploma of Higher Education, 40% thought that a BA or BSc was a postgraduate degree and 96% wanted qualifications with the same name to represent the same level of achievement.

In February 2011, the then Labour MP for Nottingham East, Chris Leslie, sponsored a private member's bill, the Master's Degrees (Minimum Standards) Bill 2010–12, to "prohibit universities awarding Master's degrees unless certain standards of study and assessment are met". The bill's second reading debate occurred on 21 October 2011, but was talked out by an Oxford graduate.

In Ireland, the Master of Arts at Trinity College, Dublin, is not registered with or approved by Quality and Qualifications Ireland, the national agency responsible for academic qualifications in Ireland.

== See also ==
- Ad eundem degree
- Wooden spoon (award)
- Wrangler (University of Cambridge)
