= Helen Wodehouse =

British philosopher

Helen Marion Wodehouse (12 October 1880 – 20 October 1964) was a British philosopher and Mistress of Girton College, Cambridge. She was also the first woman to hold a professorial chair at the University of Bristol.

== Life and education ==
Helen Wodehouse was born on 12 October 1880 in Bratton Fleming, North Devon. She was one of four children of the Reverend Philip John Wodehouse (brother of P. G. Wodehouse’s father, Henry Ernest Wodehouse), and his wife, Marion Bryan Wallas, meaning Helen and P.G. were cousins. She was educated at Notting Hill High School in London, where her aunt Katharine Wallas was teaching mathematics and in 1898 she won an exhibition to Girton College, Cambridge to read mathematics. She stayed on to take Part II of the Moral Sciences Tripos and obtained a first class degree in 1902. This was followed by another year in Cambridge, as Gilchrist fellow, before going to Birmingham to read for a teacher's higher diploma. She took an MA and a DPhil (1906), and held the post of lecturer in philosophy from 1903 until 1911.

== Career ==
In 1911 Wodehouse accepted the post of Principal at a new teacher training college in Bingley, Yorkshire. She argued against the prevailing view that teacher training was unnecessary: all you needed was an intelligent, well-educated person, who started teaching in a good school.

Wodehouse's next appointment in 1919, was as Chair of Education at the University of Bristol. She was one of very few women professors at that time. In 1925 she led the merger of the separate men's and women's Departments for Education against some opposition. She also initiated a system of regular assessment instead of a final examination for the Diploma of Education. This system has continued ever since. She established one of the leading departments in the country, both for professional education and for research. In 1964 the new Graduate School of Education building in Berkeley Square was named after her.

Helen Wodehouse returned to Cambridge in 1931 as Mistress of Girton. Having reached the age of sixty in 1940, she had intended to retire, but was persuaded to stay on for an extra two years because of the Second World War. Until her appointment, the Mistress of the college had also been tutor to all the undergraduates. Wodehouse changed this, appointing an assistant, Mary Duff, "To assist the Mistress in her traditional capacity as Tutor of the College". She died in Llandrindod Wells, Radnorshire, on 20 October 1964.

== Publications ==
Helen Wodehouse wrote in the fields of philosophy, theology and education. She published five books and several journal articles on educational and religious topics.

Books

- The Logic of Will, 1907
- The Presentation of Reality, 1910
- Nights and Days, and other Lay Sermons, 1916
- God the Prisoner, and other Lay Sermons, 1920
- A Survey of the History of Education, 1924
- The Scripture Lesson in the Elementary School, 1926
- Temples and Treasuries, and other Lay Sermons, 1935
- Selves and their Good, 1936
- One Kind of Religion, 1944
