= Scouloudi =

Scouloudi is a surname. Notable people with the surname include:

- Irene Scouloudi (1907-1992), English historian and philanthropist
- Cleo Scouloudi, actor appearing in the 1961 film The Guns of Navarone

== See also ==
- Stefanos Skouloudis (1838-1928), Greek banker and prime minister
