= Ella Mary Edghill =

British translator and teacher (1881–1964)

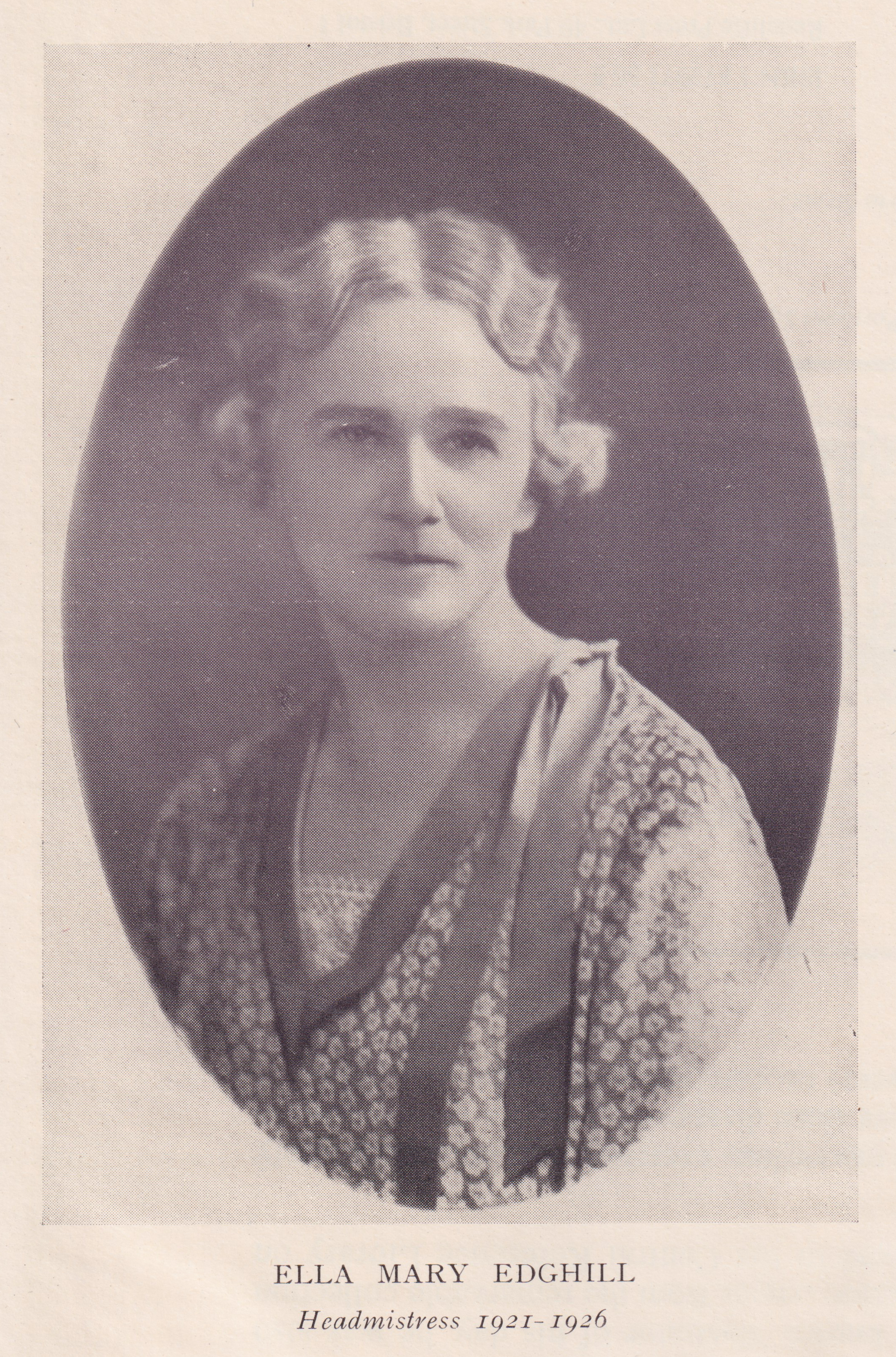
Ella Mary Edghill, Headmistress of Redland High School (1921–26)

Ella Mary Edghill (born 13 November 1881 at Aldershot; died 24 January 1964 at St Mary's Hospital, Bristol) was a British translator known primarily for her translation of Categories which appeared in Volume 1 (1928) of The Works of Aristotle series, edited by W. D. Ross and J. A. Smith and for her translation of On Interpretation by Aristotle. She was the daughter of Rev. John Cox Edghill, DD, Chaplain General to British Armed Forces, and Mary Nesfield.

She was educated at Bedford High School and Newnham College, Cambridge, where she took the Classical Tripos. She then achieved an MA and education diploma at London University. Following training at Notting Hill High school she became the senior classics mistress at Bedford High School. In November 1913 she was appointed headmistress of the King's High School for girls in Warwick. Towards the end of 1920 she was appointed headmistress of Redland High School for Girls, although she remained at Warwick till the summer of 1921 to see out the school year.

The Clarendon Press edition of 1928 describes Edghill as "E. M. Edghill M.A.; ex-associate of Newnham College, Cambridge".

A Miss "Ella Mary Edghill" was the Headmistress of Saint Felix School between 1926 and 1938.

In 1939, she was a teacher at Eastman's School in Burnham-on-Sea, where her brother, Victor John Collinson Edghill, was the principal.

== See also ==
- Octavius Freire Owen
- Scholasticism
