= Eleanor Purdie =

English philologist & teacher

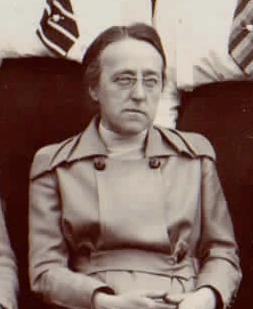
- Born: 10 January 1872; Dalston, London
- Died: 5 May 1929 (aged 57); Cheltenham

Academic background
- Education: University of Cambridge; University of Fribourg
- Thesis: The Perfective 'Aktionsart' in Polybius (1898)

Academic work
- Discipline: Classics
- Sub-discipline: philology
- Institutions: Cheltenham Ladies' College
- Notable works: Liviana

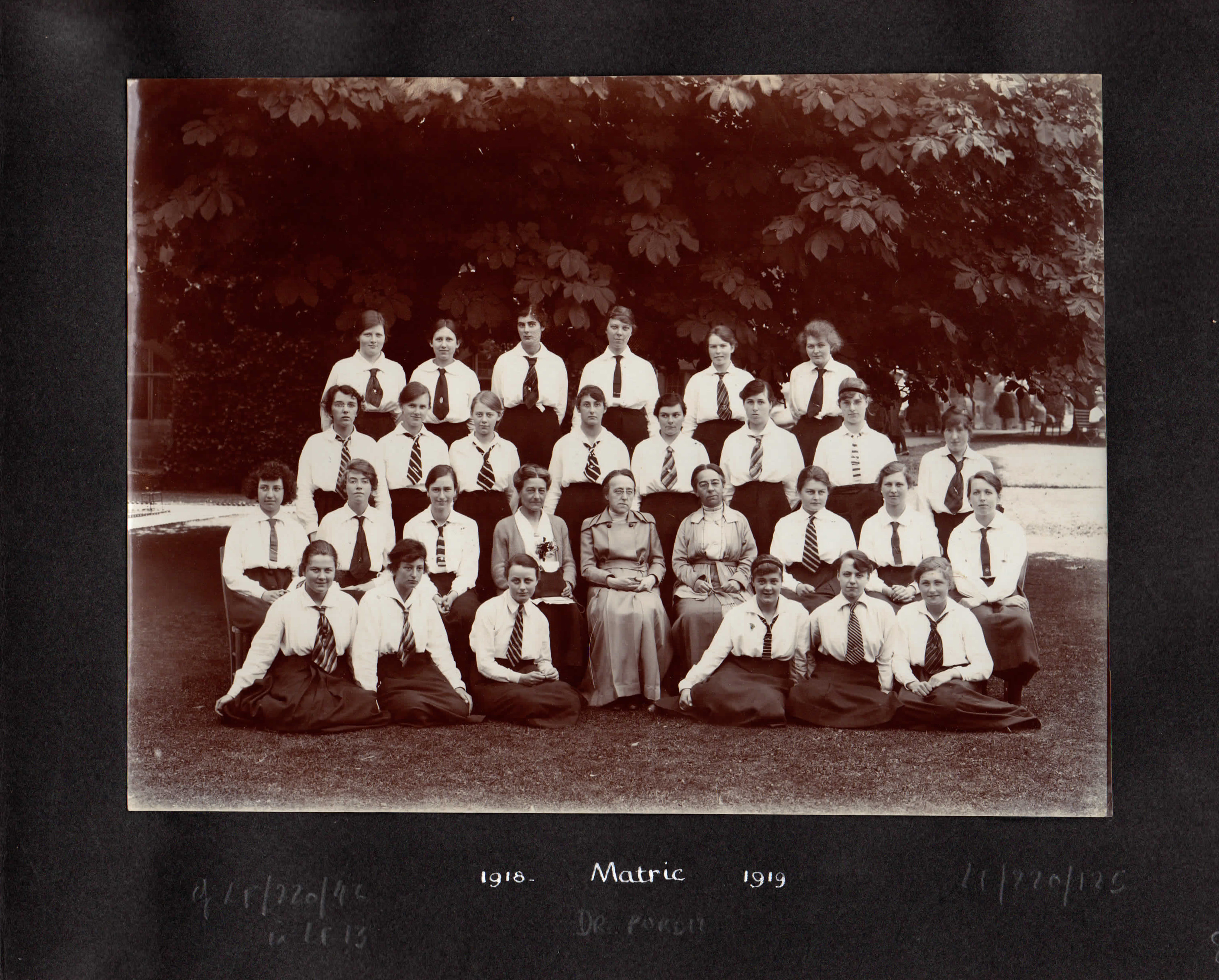
Dr. Eleanor Purdie with the Cheltenham Ladies' matriculation class 1918–19. She is in the middle of the seated row

Eleanor Purdie (10 January 1872 - 5 May 1929) was an English philologist and the first woman to obtain a doctorate from the University of Fribourg.

== Biography ==
Eleanor Purdie was born in Dalston in 1872 to Elizabeth White Blight and Walter Charles Fry Purdie. Her mother had been a proprietor of a family booksellers in Bideford, who, after her marriage continued to contribute to the family finances by working as a Berlin wool dealer. Her father was a bank clerk who was probably employed by Willis, Percival & Co., bankers in Lombard Street until their demise in 1878. She had two older siblings, Florence (who became Headmistress of the High School, Exeter) and Walter, and a younger brother Cecil.

Purdie attended Notting Hill High School for seven years. In 1889, she obtained a St Dunstan's exhibition, which she then held for three years of undergraduate studies at Newnham College, Cambridge. She obtained a First class in both parts of the Classical Tripos in 1894, gaining a star in Part II and placed top in section E. At the time, women were not awarded degrees by Cambridge University, which posed bureaucratic problems for her when she applied to the University of Fribourg for her doctorate. A Marion Kennedy Studentship enabled her to become the first woman student at Fribourg. After a year of studying Sanskrit, Greek and Indo-European philology, she took a Fellowship at Bryn Mawr College. She obtained a PhD in classical philology from Fribourg in 1896 under the guidance of Wilhelm Streitberg, an Indo-Europeanist.

Purdie taught for a year at her high school, before joining the staff of Cheltenham Ladies' College in 1898. She continued to teach there for 25 years, retiring in 1923 from the position of Senior Classical Mistress.

Besides her doctoral thesis, Purdie wrote several primers for Latin language instruction for high school. It has been pointed out that she also co-edited a collection of essays in comparative philology, although her contributions were relegated to the acknowledgements.

Purdie was active in pedagogy, writing articles on women's education in the US, Germany and Switzerland. She was also part of a movement to unify grammatical terminology, submitting a co-written report that made twenty-five recommendations for the standardisation of usage across languages, modern and ancient.

Purdie died on 5 May 1929, and was interred in the Prestbury churchyard.

== Legacy ==
The Eleanor Purdie Prize for Greek Composition was established in 1936 by Newnham College.

== Works ==
=== Articles ===
- Purdie, Eleanor (1898). "The Perfective 'Aktionsart' in Polybius". In Brugmann, Karl; Streitberg, Wilhelm (eds.). Indogermanische Forschungen. Zeitschrift für indogermanische Sprach- und Altertumskunde. Vol. 9. Karl J. Trübner. pp. 63–153. doi:10.1515/9783110242515.63.
- Purdie, Eleanor (1899). "University Education for Women in America, Germany and Switzerland". Educational Review: A Magazine of the Science and Art of Education and Review of Current Educational Literature and Events. 1.

=== Books ===
- Purdie, Eleanor (1924). Liviana: A Second Year Reader and Writer Based on Livy I and II. Cambridge University.
- Purdie, Eleanor (1925). Fabulae heroicae. Cambridge University.
- Purdie, Eleanor; Saunders, M. B. (1932). Matriculation Latin. Bell.

== Citations ==
- "Eleanor Purdie". England and Wales Birth Registration Index, 1837–2008. 1872.
- "Eleanor Purdie". England and Wales Census. 1881.
- "University Intelligence: Great Newnham Classics". Leeds Mercury. 22 June 1894.
- Darbishire, Herbert Dukinfield, ed. (1895). Relliquiæ Philologicæ: Or, Essays in Comparative Philology. Cambridge University.
- "List of Members of Old Girls' Association in 1904". The Notting Hill High School Magazine (21). 1905.
- Lodge, G. (12 March 1910). "Editorial: Uniform Grammatical Terminology". The Classical Weekly. 3 (19).
- "Miss Eleanor Purdie, PhD". Cheltenham Chronicle. 11 May 1929.
- "Miss Eleanor Purdie: Burial at Prestbury". Gloucestershire Echo. 10 May 1929.
- "Doings of Old Girls". The Notting Hill High School Magazine (45). 1930.
- Cambridge University Calendar 1973–74. Cambridge University. 27 June 1974. ISBN 9780521203968.
- Evans, G.R. (25 June 2004). The University of Cambridge: A New History. I.B.Tauris. ISBN 978-0-85773-024-4.
- Altermatt, Urs (2009). Die Universität Freiburg auf der Suche nach Identität. Saint-Paul. ISBN 978-3-7278-1600-0.
- Blight, Ivor (2012). "William Blight and Daughters: Booksellers of Bideford". Quadrat (25).
- Beard, Mary (21 May 2017). "James Clackson's inaugural: Dangerous Lunatics?". TheTLS.
- Clackson, James (2021). "Dangerous Lunatics: Comparative Philology in Cambridge and Beyond". In Harrison, Stephen; Pelling, Christopher (eds.). Classical Scholarship and Its History. De Gruyter. pp. 131–54. doi:10.1515/9783110719215-007. ISBN 978-3-11-071921-5.
