= Redland High School for Girls =

Former school in Bristol, England (1882–2017)

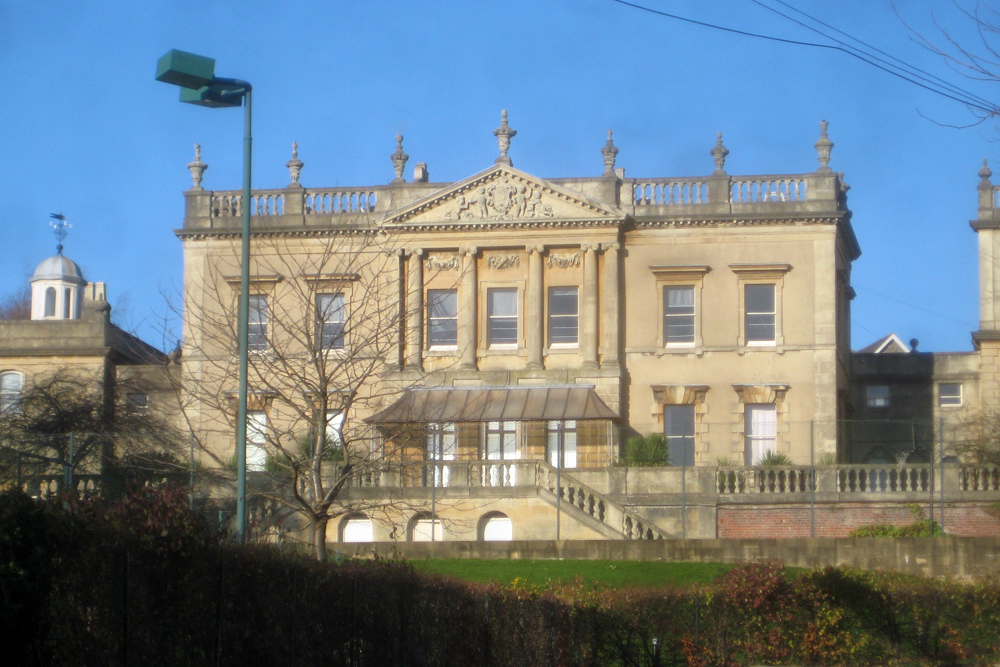
- School viewed from Redland Road

Location
- Redland Court Road; Bristol, BS6 7EF; England; 51.4711°N 2.6020°W

Information
- Type: All-Through Private
- Motto: So hateth she derknesse
- Established: 1882
- Closed: 2017
- Department for Education URN: 109372 Tables
- Head teacher: Perdita Davidson
- Gender: Girls
- Age: 3 to 18
- Enrolment: 416
- Capacity: 407
- Houses: Chestnut, Rowan, Willow and Maple
- Colour: Bottle Green

Listed Building – Grade II*
- Official name: Redland Court (Redland High School)
- Designated: 8 January 1959
- Reference no.: 1291739

Redland High School for Girls was a selective and independent, non-denominational girls' school in the suburb of Redland, Bristol, England. The school merged with the Red Maids' School in May 2016, with the new merged school named Redmaids' High School and based at the Red Maids' site from September 2017 in Westbury-on-Trym.

== Admissions ==
Redland High School admitted girls aged 3–18 years and also boys aged 3–6 from 2014–17.

== History ==
Redland High School was founded in 1882 on the instigation of two liberal congregationalist ministers: Rev. T. G. Rose and Rev. Urijah Thomas, Minister of Redland Park Church. Rev Thomas was an important figure in the women's movement in Bristol in the late 19th century, serving as one of the secretaries to the Bristol & West of England Women's Suffrage Society.

The school's first head teacher was Elizabeth Cocks (1882–1907), who implemented a modern curriculum, including subjects such as chemistry, which were not typically taught to girls at that time. Under her direction the school expanded rapidly from four pupils on opening, to c. 40 by the end of its first year, to 150 by 1885, when it moved to the new premises at Redland Court. By 1904 the school had 238 pupils, which led to the decision to open a separate junior school and kindergarten.

Early governors of Redland's school included Agnes Beddoe, Elizabeth and Emily Sturge who were leading suffragists and campaigners for women's higher education in Victorian times. The senior school was housed in an old manor-house known as Redland Court which dates from 1732–35. This replaced an earlier Elizabethan manor house, with some wood paneling from the old house being incorporated into the new one. The eighteenth-century house was built by John Strachan for John Cossins and was designated by English Heritage as a Grade II* listed building. It underwent many extensions. In October 2006, a building previously belonging to the junior school was converted into the music school, expanding the senior school once again. In 2014 they opened an early years foundation stage building in conjunction with nearby boys school, QEH.

The school was spread across five sites: the senior school, on Redland Court Road; the music school, also on Redland Court Road; the junior school, opposite the senior school; the sixth form house, on Woodstock Road; and the PE field at Golden Hill.

Following the closure of the school, the senior school site, along with the sixth form house / bursary was sold, partially demolished and turned into housing now known as Redland Court. The junior school site in Grove Park was turned into a day nursery and the music school converted into a wellness centre and medical clinic

== Houses ==
During the late 1960s, the house system was abandoned. Prior to that there had been six houses named after former benefactors (Elizabeth Cocks, Gamble, Percival, Urijah Thomas, Gilmore Barnet and Tait). There were regular house competitions including drama, music, and sports. The drama competitions took a whole day. Members of years 7–9 acted while the older pupils directed, did lighting, make up and costumes. The new house system was in place from 2003, and there were four houses. These were Maple (red), Chestnut (yellow), Willow (green) and Rowan (blue). House captains were elected by each house respectively from Year 13. There were also two House Vice-captains from Year 12 and two sports captains from Year 10. In addition, a member of staff served as Head of House on a permanent, unelected basis.

== Uniform ==
Between 1975 and 1986, the winter uniform was a bottle green wrap skirt, bottle green jumper or cardigan, white shirt and bottle green tie. Green mackintosh and optional green hat, regulation brown outdoor and indoor shoes from a range of five specified styles from Clarks. The summer uniform up to year three was a white and green candy striped knee-length short sleeve cotton dress, fourth and fifth years could choose between green and white candy stripe, yellow and green tartan or green paisley cotton. Games uniform was a white aertex shirt and grey flannel kilt. All uniform to be bought from Marshes department store on Whiteladies Road.

From around 2003 to the school's closure, the senior school uniform consisted of a green blazer, blue jumper, white shirt and a kilt in the school's own tartan. The junior school uniform was similar, but with a tartan pinafore dress instead of a kilt, and a light blue shirt. At this time, the uniform had to be bought from John Lewis at Cribbs Causeway.

Sixth Formers wore their own clothes.

== Headmistresses ==
- Miss Elizabeth Cocks 1882–1907
- Miss Emily Shekleton 1907–1920
- Miss Ella Mary Edghill 1921–1926
- Miss Clara Millicent Taylor 1926–1940
- Miss Alick Berwick 1940–1944
- Miss Sylvia Peters 1945–1968
- Miss Storm Hume 1969–1985
- Miss Eunice Hobbs 1986–1989
- Mrs Carol Lear 1989–2002
- Dr Ruth Weeks 2002–2006
- Mrs Caroline Bateson 2006–2015
- Miss Stephanie Ferro 2015–2016
- Mrs Perdita Davidson 2016–2017

=== Former head teachers ===
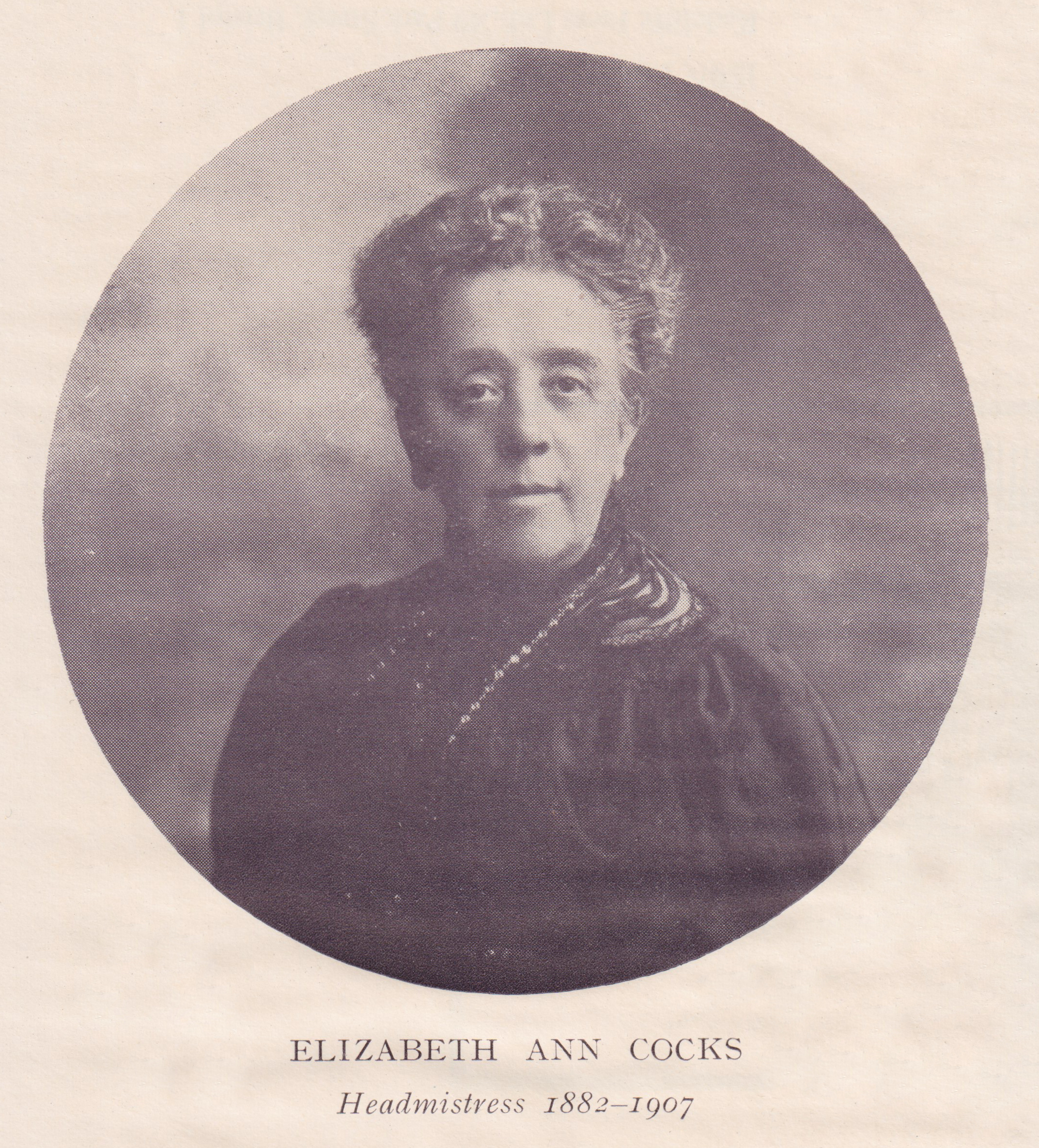
Elizabeth Cocks

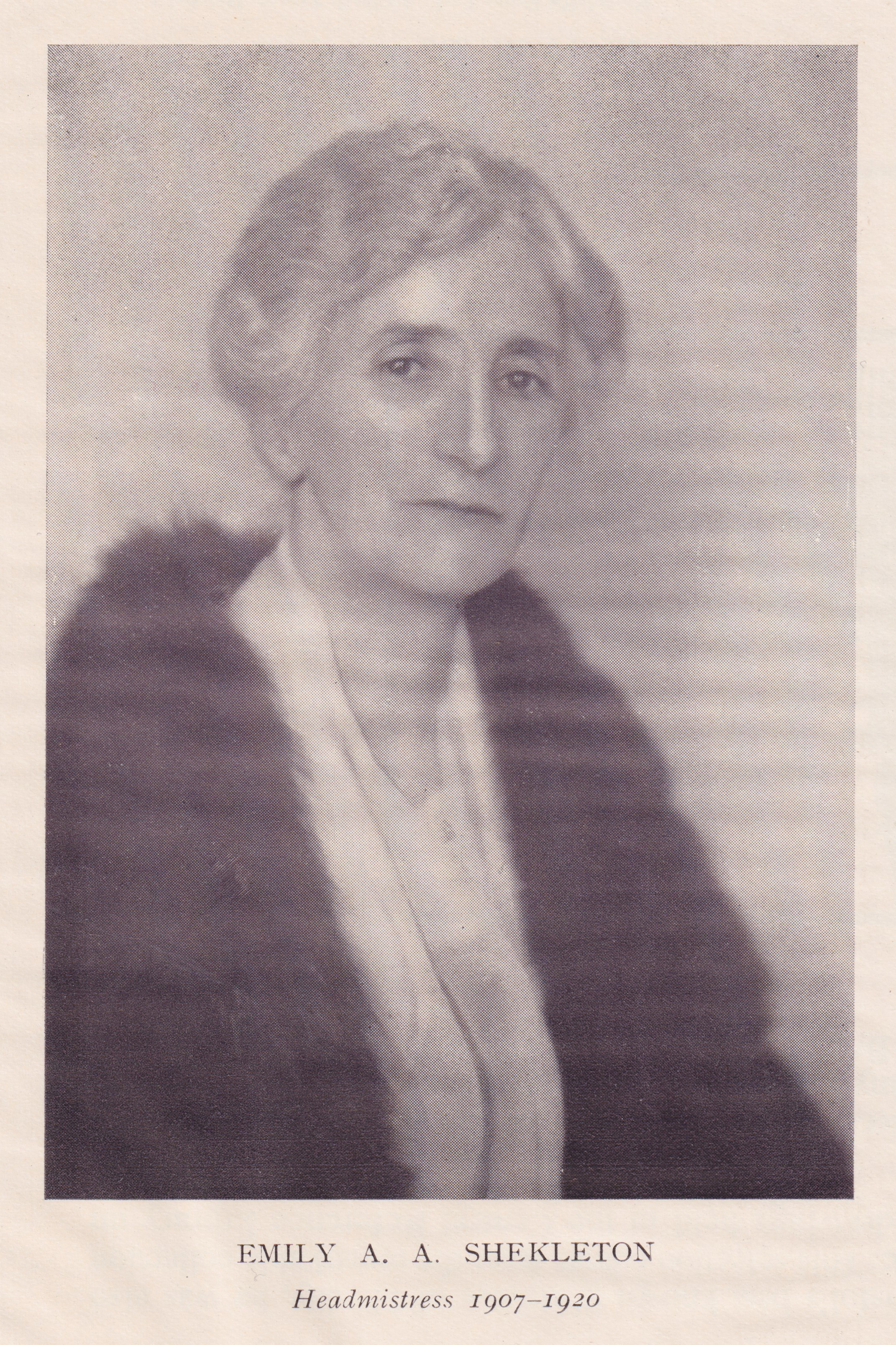
Emily Shekleton

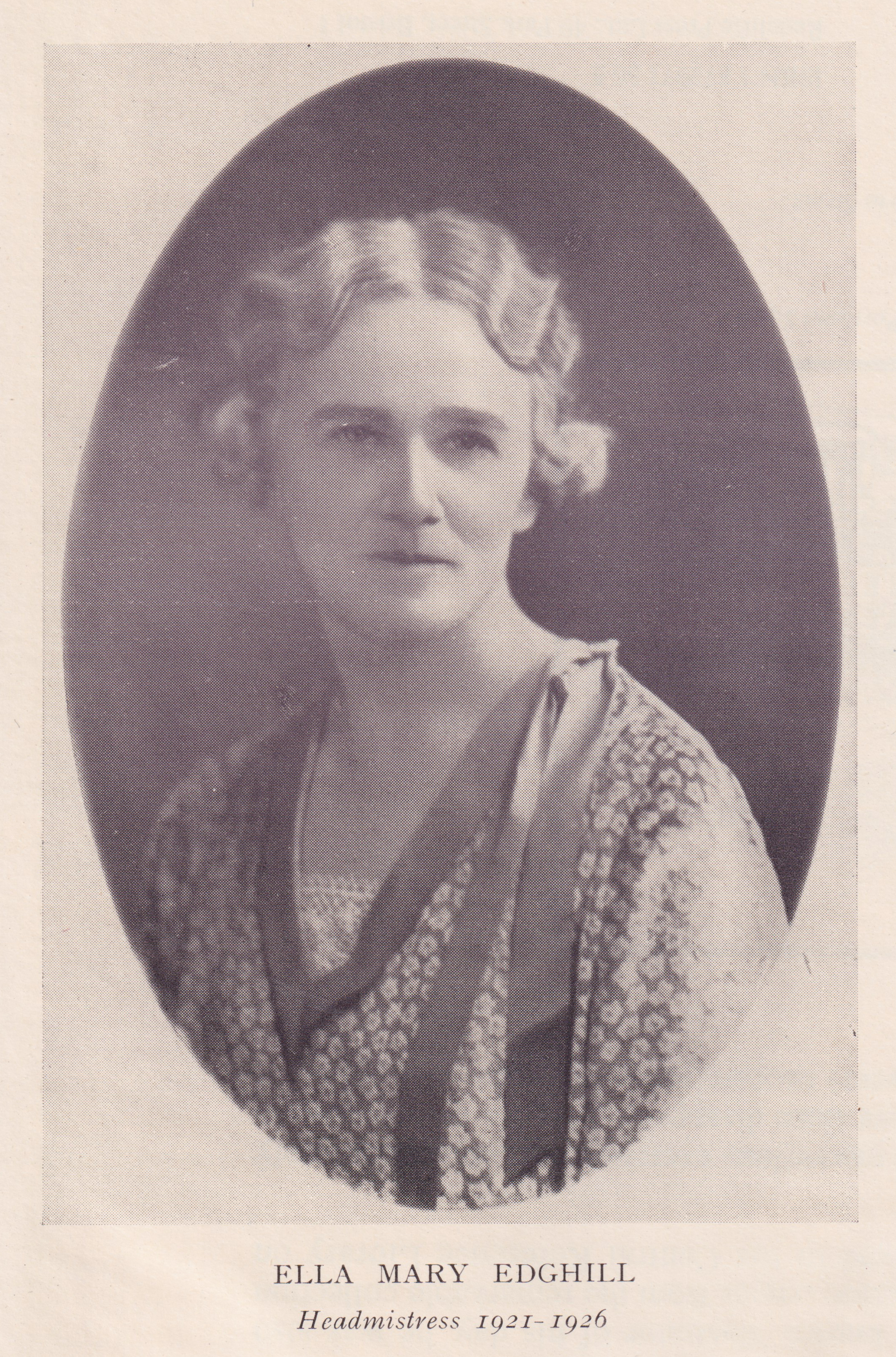
Ella Mary Edghill

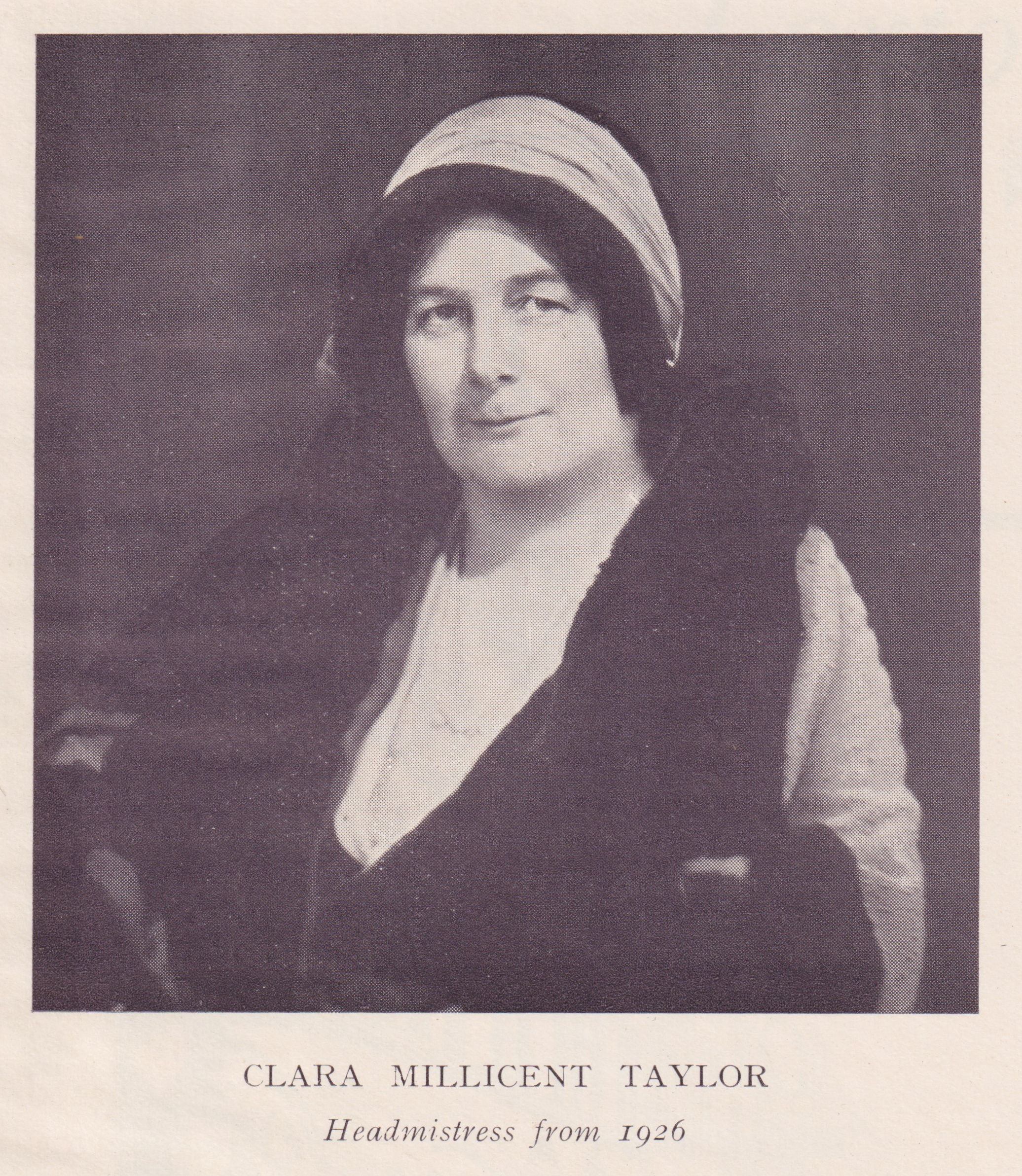
Clara Taylor

== Notable former students ==
- Enid Stacy (1868-1903), socialist and feminist activist, as well as a teacher at the school from 1891.
- Eveline Dew Blacker (1884–1956), Bristol's first female architect and co-designer of the Bristol Cenotaph.
- Beryl Corner (1910–2007), first paediatrician in the south-west of England and one of the British founders of neonatology, the care of newborn babies; she was also the last survivor of a group of women paediatricians whose achievements helped to break down barriers to the advancement of women in medicine.
- Claire Craig, Provost of The Queen's College, Oxford.
- Sara Wheeler (born 1961), travel writer. After being a pupil at Redland High she went on to study Classics and Modern Languages at Brasenose College, University of Oxford. After writing about her travels on the Greek island of Euboea and in Chile, she was accepted by the US National Science Foundation as their first female writer-in-residence at the South Pole and spent seven months in Antarctica.
- Nazneen Rahman, leads research directed at identifying, characterising, and clinically implementing genes that predispose to cancer. She was awarded the No.3 spot in BBC Radio 4's Woman's Hour 2014 Power List in recognition of her work.
- Tanya Louise Beckett (born 1966), English television and radio journalist.
- Dame Elisabeth Anne Marian Frost Hoodless (born 1941), Executive Director (1975–2011) of Community Service Volunteers (CSV), a United Kingdom volunteering and training charity.
- Sophie Anderton (born 1977), model and reality television personality
- Sally Beauman (née Kinsey-Miles, 1944–2016), journalist and author of Rebecca's Tale

See Category:People educated at Redland High School for Girls

== See also ==
- Grade II* listed buildings in Bristol
- List of direct grant grammar schools
