= Ad eundem degree =

Honorary degree for honorary alumni

An ad eundem degree is an academic degree awarded by one university or college to an alumnus of another, in a process commonly known as incorporation. The recipient of the ad eundem degree is often a faculty member at the institution which awards the degree, e.g. at the University of Cambridge, where incorporation is expressly limited to a person who "has been admitted to a University office or a Headship or a Fellowship (other than an Honorary Fellowship) of a College, or holds a post in the University Press ... or is a Head-elect or designate of a College".

An ad eundem degree is not an earned degree.

== History ==
In the later Middle Ages it was common, when a graduate from one university moved into the neighborhood of another, for the new university to admit the graduate as a courtesy, "at the same degree" (in Latin, ad eundem gradum). Thus if someone was a Bachelor of Arts in the university that they had attended, they would likewise be a bachelor of arts of their new university. Not every college extended this courtesy to all other colleges, however.

The practice of incorporation diminished in the early 19th century, but it continues at the University of Oxford, the University of Cambridge, and Trinity College Dublin.

== Australia ==
At the University of Sydney, members of the academic staff and general staff who do not hold a degree from the university, "and who have completed a minimum of ten years’ service prior to their retirement may be considered by Senate, on their retirement, for admission ad eundem gradum to an appropriate degree of the university."

Requests for ad eundem gradum degrees also occurred at Adelaide University in the 1880s.

== Ireland ==
A number of female students at Oxford and Cambridge were awarded ad eundem University of Dublin degrees at Trinity College Dublin, between 1904 and 1907, at a time when their own universities refused to confer degrees upon women and were nicknamed the "steamboat ladies".

Today, graduates of the Universities of Oxford and Cambridge are eligible to apply for corresponding degrees of Trinity College Dublin, and vice versa, provided that they wish to register for a degree at Trinity College or are members of the academic staff, and pay the required fee.

== South Africa ==
Rhodes University in South Africa uses the term ad eundem gradum to give a student status to undertake a research higher degree based on experience, as opposed to an explicit qualification. In this case the student does not acquire a qualification, but is exempt from an entry requirement.

== United Kingdom ==
At the University of Oxford, incorporation first appeared in the University Statutes in 1516, although the practice itself is older: in the 15th and early 16th centuries, incorporation was granted to members of universities from all over Europe. In 1861, incorporation was restricted to members of Cambridge University and Trinity College, Dublin. In 1908, incorporation was further restricted to specific degrees from these universities. While not an earned degree, both original degree(s) and incorporated ad eundem degree(s) are given in post-nominals listed in the Oxford University Calendar.

After the foundation of the University of Durham in 1832, Durham made attempts to have its degrees recognised in the ad eundem system, introducing the first external examiner system, with all examinations co-marked by an Oxford academic, to assure the other universities that it was maintaining comparable standards. These attempts were rebuffed by the other universities, and eventually abandoned by Durham. Still, Durham granted graduates from other universities degrees ad eundem until the practice was abolished by the adoption of new university statutes in 1909.

== United States ==
=== Original use ===
In the United States, the ad eundem Bachelor of Arts and Master of Arts as a regularly awarded academic qualification from graduates of other colleges and universities generally dates from the colonial period, and was awarded at the institutions listed below.

Institution	First Documented	Most Recently Documented
Harvard University	Common in the 1700s. Ad eundem degrees were not specifically recorded as such at Harvard until the period after 1750.	1830
Yale University	1705	1879
Columbia University	1767	1770
Princeton University	1763	1884
University of Pennsylvania		
Williams College	1795	

=== Contemporary use ===
Three universities in the United States refer to the honorary MA degrees awarded to professors at various stages of their careers as ad eundem degrees.

Institution	MA awarded at what stage	First documented	Most recent
Brown University	Associate Professor	1945	2026
Lawrence University	Retirement	1934	2022
Wesleyan University	Professor	1894	2021

==== Upon being awarded tenure ====
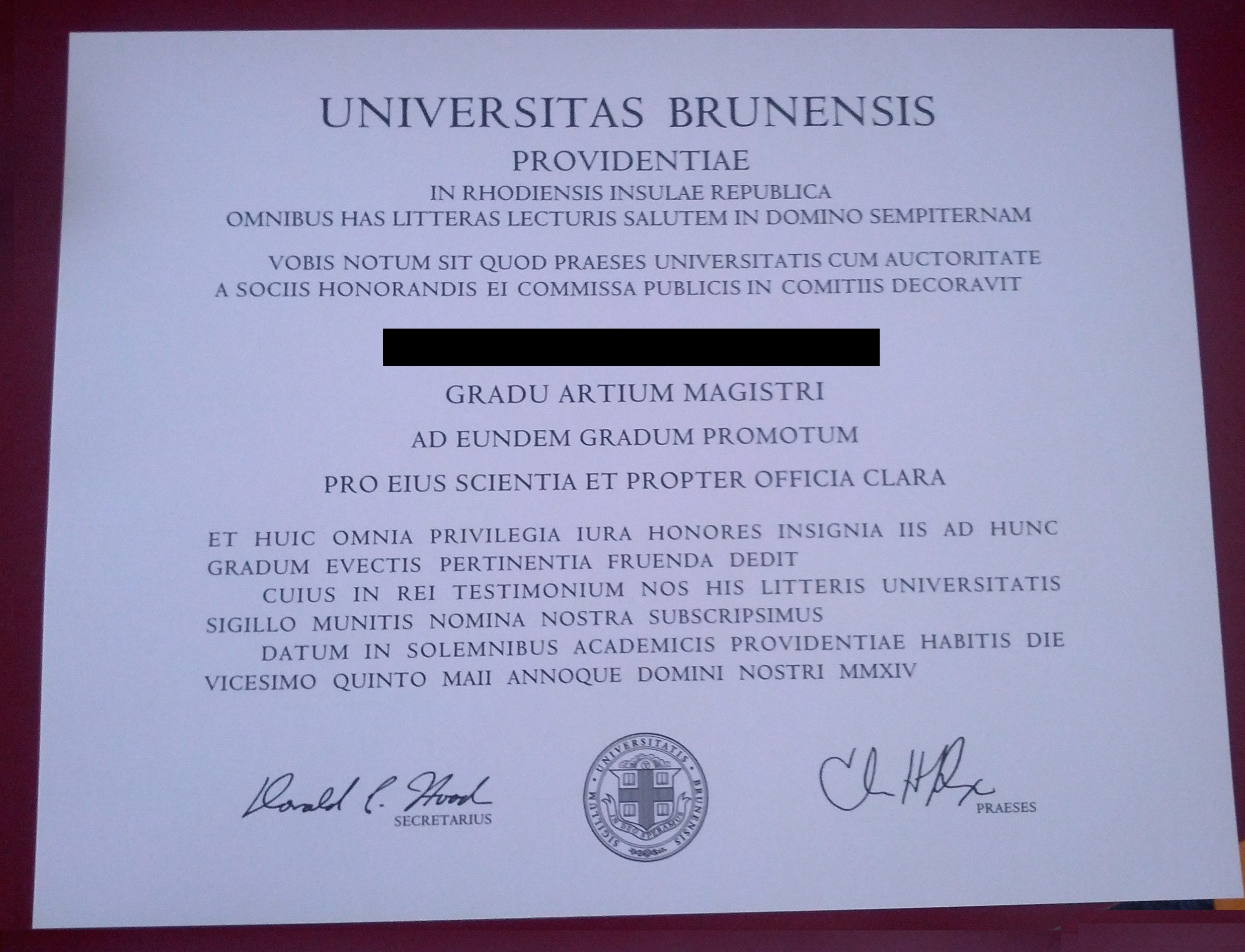
Ad eundem gradum Master of Arts degree awarded by Brown University in 2014

At Brown, ad eundem degrees are awarded to those faculty who are granted tenure and the rank of associate professor, usually after approximately eight years of service to the university as an assistant professor or for a shorter amount of time for a professor with prior service at another university. The degrees have normally been awarded as a part of the annual May commencement ceremony.

==== Upon being promoted to full professor ====
At Wesleyan, ad eundem degrees are conferred upon those who rise to the rank of full professor. However, those professors who already earned a bachelor's degree from Wesleyan by attending as an undergraduate are not presented with a second degree.

==== Upon retirement ====
At Lawrence, ad eundem degrees are conferred upon professors at their retirement. This first occurred in 1934, when college president Henry Merritt Wriston, earlier a professor at Wesleyan University and later president at Brown University, instituted a retirement age for professors of 65 years old. The ad eundem degrees were meant to "soften the blow" for the three faculty forced to retire.

== See also ==
- Master of Arts (Oxford, Cambridge, and Dublin)
