= Visionary Honours =

British award show

The Visionary Honours
- Awarded for: Social Impact in culture, media & entertainment
- Country: United Kingdom
- Presented by: Visionary Arts Foundation
- First award: 2019
- Website: visionaryarts.org.uk/awards/

The Visionary Honours is an annual British award show that celebrates culture, media and entertainment that has inspired social change or debate.

== History ==
The award show is produced by the Visionary Arts Foundation, which was founded by Adrian Grant, to support young adults using artistic platforms such as music, film, theatre, literature and digital media as the sound board for discussion and raising awareness across social issues from better inclusion, diversity, equality and mental health, to climate crisis and anti-social behaviour.

== Recipients ==
=== 2019 ===
The inaugural VISIONARY Honours were held on 8 February 2019, at the home of BAFTA 195 Piccadilly in London and hosted by Lenny Henry. The show included a live performance from Professor Green and Rag'n'Bone Man.

- Film of the Year: Black Panther (film) received by Danny Sapani
- Documentary Of the Year: Suicide: The Ripple Effect received by Kevin Hines
- Song of the Year: Photographs received by Professor Green
- Book of the Year: What A Time To Be Alone received by Chidera Eggerue
- TV Show of the Year: Doctor Who received by Malorie Blackman and Chris Chibnall
- Play/Musical of the Year: Hamilton (musical) by Lin-Manuel Miranda received by
- Broadcast/Media of the Year: Ways To Change The World (podcast) received by Krishnan Guru-Murthy
- Most Inspiring Person of the Year: Michelle Obama
- Community Person of the Year: Rachel Wang of Chocolate Films
- Legacy Honour: Nelson Mandela received by Mandla Mandela

=== 2020 ===
The 2020 award ceremony was originally scheduled to be held at the Ham Yard Hotel in London on 18 March 2020, but had to be postponed due to the COVID-19 pandemic. They were eventually held as an online virtual ceremony on 6 May 2020 and presented by Scarlette Douglas.

- Book of the Year Proud received by Juno Dawson
- Influencer/Journalist of the Year: George the Poet received by George the Poet
- Documentary of the Year: Odd One Out (BBC3) received by Jesy Nelson
- Musical of the Year: Six (musical) received by Lucy Moss
- Television Show of the Year: Ross Kemp Living With... (ITV/Mongoose Productions) received by Ross Kemp
- Song of the Year: Black by Dave (rapper) received by Fraser T. Smith
- Film of the Year: Blue Story by Rapman received by Junior Afolabi Salokun
- Inspiring Person of the Year: June Sarpong received by June Sarpong
- Community Person of the Year: Sulaiman Khan founder of This Ability Ltd.
