= Ethel Gavin =

Scottish headmistress (1866–1918)

- Born: 2 April 1866; Elgin
- Died: 2 March 1918 (aged 51); Wimbledon
- Education: Girton College, Cambridge
- Occupation: headmistress

Ethel Gavin (2 April 1866 – 2 March 1918) was a British educationist and headmistress. She led several schools including Wimbledon High School and Notting Hill High School.

== Life ==
Gavin was born in Elgin in central Scotland. She was the first born girl of Mary Isabella Macandrew and John Gavin. They had a house Wester Elchies near Elgin. Her father had spent nearly twenty years in Kandy in Ceylon where he was known as "Honest John". Her parents paid for her education in Switzerland but she turned when she was fourteen to attend the Maida Vale High School. She was then able to enrol at Girton College, Cambridge in 1885. After she graduated she returned to her school in Maida Vale to begin her teaching career.

Shrewsbury High School had opened as a day school for girls in 1885. In 1893 Gavin took over as head at the age of 27. The school had outgrown its site and it moved to a new (its present) location on the banks of the River Severn in central Shrewsbury in 1895. Gavin moved on to another headship in 1897. In 1905 Gavin was able to obtain a master's degree from Trinity College, Dublin by becoming one of the Steamboat ladies. Oxford and Cambridge allowed women to take degree courses but refused to confer degrees on women irrespective of their achievement. Trinity College had decided to confer degrees on any student who had passed courses at Cambridge or Oxford. They were not expecting 5,000 women to travel to Dublin and to pay the fees so that they could have a degree. The offer was only open for three years and Gavin was lucky enough to take advantage during this time.

Harriet Morland Jones had been the founding head of Notting Hill School Jones retired in 1900 and controversially Gavin was appointed instead of an internal heir apparent, Mrs M. Withiel, and resignations followed. Mrs Withiel left to become a school inspector and later inspected her former school. Gavin was described as a "capable and experienced headmistress".

Gavin became the head of Wimbledon High School in 1908. During World War I, the school endured a difficult time; Gavin was in Germany at the time and was detained for some weeks. A fire broke out in 1917 and gutted the main building. Gavin organised the recovery but died at Wimbledon in early 1918 from cancer.
