= Golden Hill, Bristol =

Area of Bristol, England

Coordinates: 51.4876°N 2.5951°W

Golden Hill
- Location within Bristol
- OS grid reference: ST587766
- Unitary authority: Bristol
- Region: South West
- Country: England
- Sovereign state: United Kingdom
- Post town: BRISTOL
- Postcode district: BS
- Dialling code: 0117
- Police: Avon and Somerset
- Fire: Avon
- Ambulance: South Western
- UK Parliament: Bristol North West

Golden Hill is an inner suburb of Bristol, England, lying east of Horfield Common and north-east of Bishopston. Redland and Henleaze are nearby. The housing is mainly in private ownership and was built in the 1920s and 1930s.

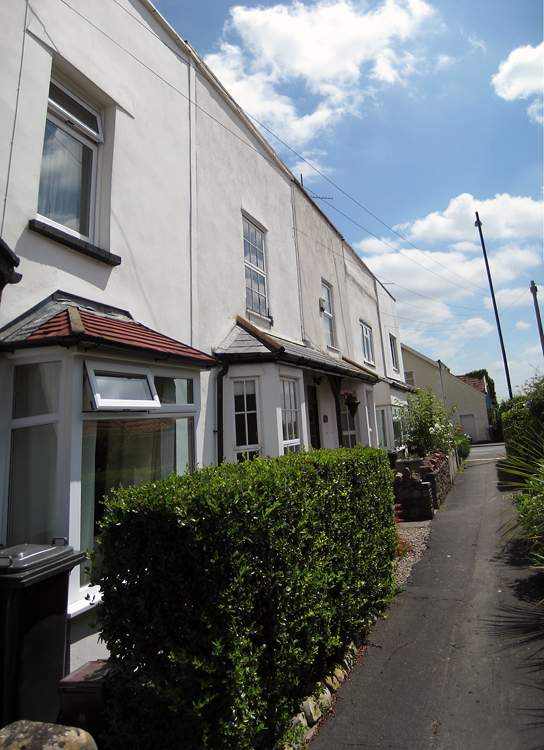
The lane known as Golden Hill, off Kellaway Avenue, Bristol.

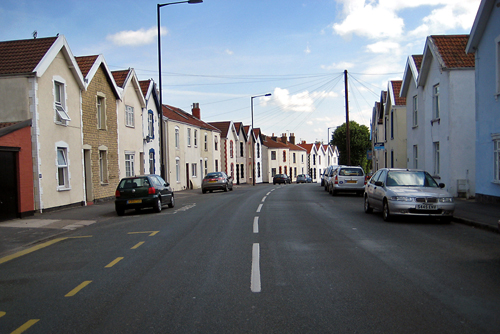
Kellaway Avenue, Golden Hill, Bristol

Bristol Rovers practise on the football pitch, though it is closed for maintenance as of 2016. The fields are owned by Redland High School for Girls. A large Tesco store was built in 1993 on an adjacent green-field site, which had been for many years one of the playing fields of Bristol Grammar School. The construction was unpopular with the local community and drew protests. Plans for expansion are currently being reviewed.

A second playing field is located in Golden Hill on Wimbledon Road. This is used by Golden Hill Sports Ltd (registered charity 1118954), which runs the YMCA Cricket Club and Golden Hill Sports Football Club. In addition, the charity also organises children's activity days during the school holidays as well as a number of social events throughout the year.
