= Elizabeth Sturge =

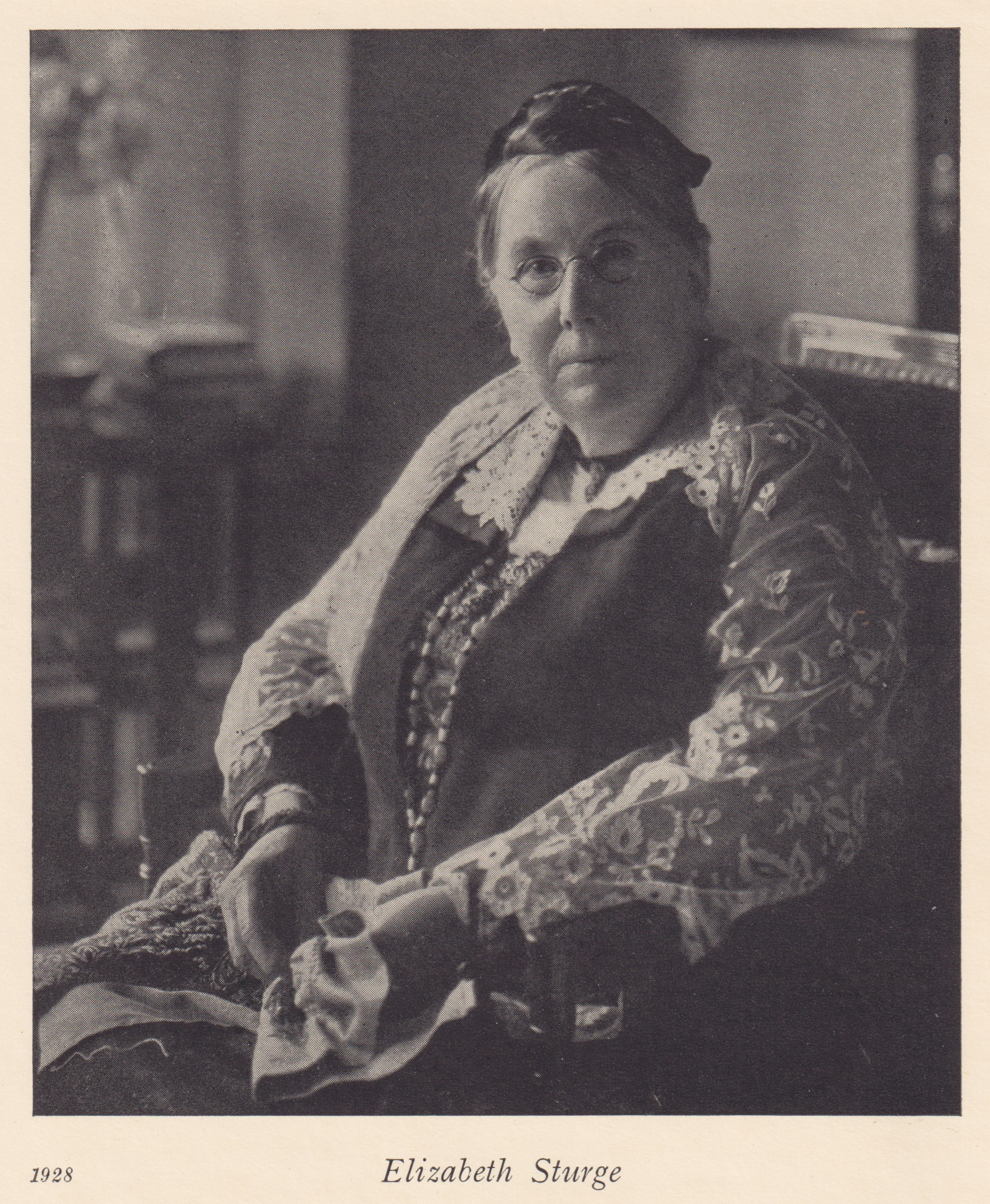
- Born: 1849; Highbury Villa, Cotham New Road, Bristol
- Died: 18 June 1944 (aged 94–95); Bristol
- Citizenship: Great Britain
- Occupation: Charity worker
- Known for: Social and political activism: female suffrage, education for women and social housing
- Parents: William Sturge (father); Charlotte Allen Sturge (mother)
- Relatives: Emily Sturge 1847-1892 (sister) and 10 other siblings

Elizabeth Sturge (1849-1944) was a British women's suffragist and campaigner on social issues. Along with her sister, Emily Sturge, she helped establish Redland High School for Girls in Bristol.

== Early life and education ==
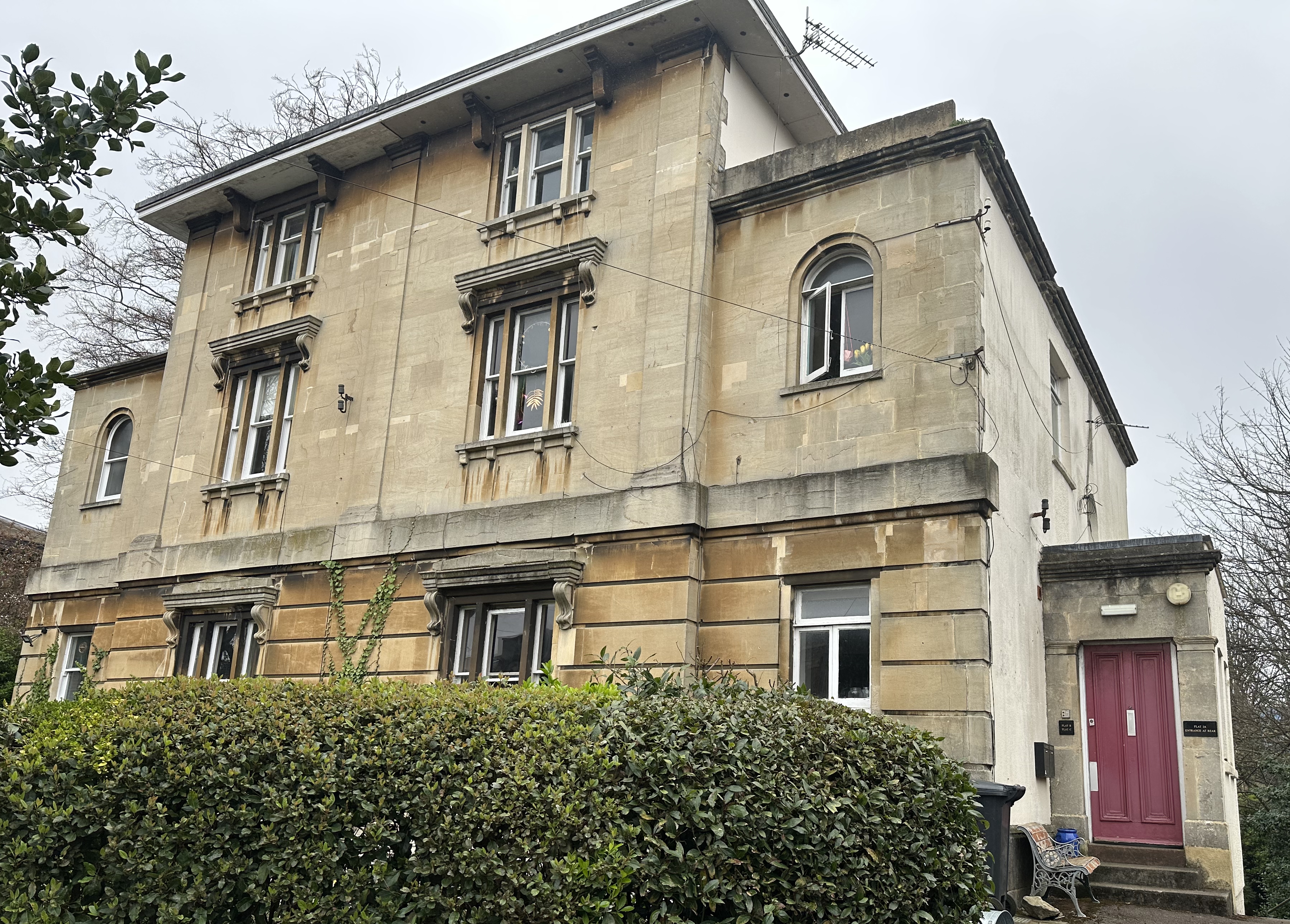
Highbury Villa, Cotham

Elizabeth Sturge was born in 1849 in Highbury Villa, Cotham New Road, Bristol. This is the property now known as 2 Cotham Road. She was the third daughter of the prominent Quaker surveyor and land agent, William Sturge, and his wife, Charlotte.

Sturge first attended a day school in Bristol, where she 'led a life of abject misery' before being sent to a Quaker school in Weston-super-Mare aged nine, where she remained for 18 months. After that she was taught at the family home at 25 Somerset Street, Bristol, by a governess for some time, before returning to the Weston school in Jan 1863, then on to a school in Leicester till she was sixteen.

Aged sixteen and back at home, Sturge received part-time teaching in Latin and German, while also being required to teach her younger siblings. Opportunities for women's higher education began to develop from 1868. Women's colleges were established at Oxford and Cambridge universities, and in Bristol a group of Clifton liberals began to run 'lectures for ladies', which Sturge and many other young women attended. Sturge continued to attend classes at University College Bristol when it was established in 1876. The new college had partly come about through the efforts of Elizabeth's elder sister, Emily Sturge, along with the Clifton Association for Promoting Higher Education for Women (est. 1868).

== Career and social activism ==
In 1878 Sturge was appointed as one of the managers of the Red Lodge Reformatory for Girls, formerly run by Mary Carpenter. Sturge became the Honorary Secretary and worked there till 1883.

In 1883 Sturge, along with other members of the family, became beneficiaries of rich but childless relatives, George and Jane Sturge, who left £300,000 on their death to charities, as well as a large number of nephews and nieces, who each received lifetime annuities of £104 per year. That is equivalent to £13,200 pa at 2023 prices.

In 1886 Sturge moved to London, to work on a voluntary basis for Octavia Hill, who was running a charitable endeavour to provide decent housing for the poor. This required Sturge and other women to manage blocks of properties, collecting rents and arranging maintenance. Sturge worked in Southwark and remained in the capital for five years.

Following the death of her mother in 1891, Sturge, how aged 42, returned to Bristol to look after her aged father. She continued to be involved in various social and educational charities, as well as the Women's Movement. Following the accidental death of her sister, Emily Sturge, in 1892, Elizabeth was asked to take her place on the Bristol School Board, to which Emily had been elected in 1880. While Elizabeth felt unable to take up the position, she was heavily involved with Bristol's Charity Organisation Society (later Bristol Civic League) and worked with other feminists, such as Eliza Walker Dunbar, Mary Clifford and Josephine Butler. In 1896 Elizabeth was invited on to the council of the recently established Redland High School for Girls. She served on this till 1917, after which she was appointed a vice-president of the council in recognition of her services. In 1932 she wrote the foreword to an official history of the school.

While Sturge was a committed suffragist, she remained a member of what she described as the, 'Old Guard', who were the followers of Millicent Fawcett. A such, they did not support the civil disobedience of the 'Pankhursts' - the suffragettes who started a campaign of non-violent direct action from 1906. Nevertheless, Sturge said she:

'recognized their enthusiasm and heroism in facing imprisonment for themselves and their followers, and we felt that it was up to us to lend the whole weight of our influence in pushing forward the cause by every constitutional means'

While there remained strong opposition to suffrage up to 1914, Sturge felt that the First World War, in which women played such active roles as administrators and workers, meant that by 1918 'the opposition had melted away'. Sturge wrote her memoir in 1928, at the time when the vote was extended to all women over the age of 21. In her later years Elizabeth Sturge lived with her sister in a house a house near Durdham Down. Largely blind and increasingly frail in her last years, she died of a heart attack on 18 June 1944. Her memorial service included a reading by the Dean of Bristol Cathedral. Her grave was unmarked. Elizabeth's obituary in the Western Daily Press, described her as:

a pioneer in social service and one of the small band who were the advance guard of the army of women who now take an active interest in affairs which affect in so many ways the life of the community.

== Memorialisation ==
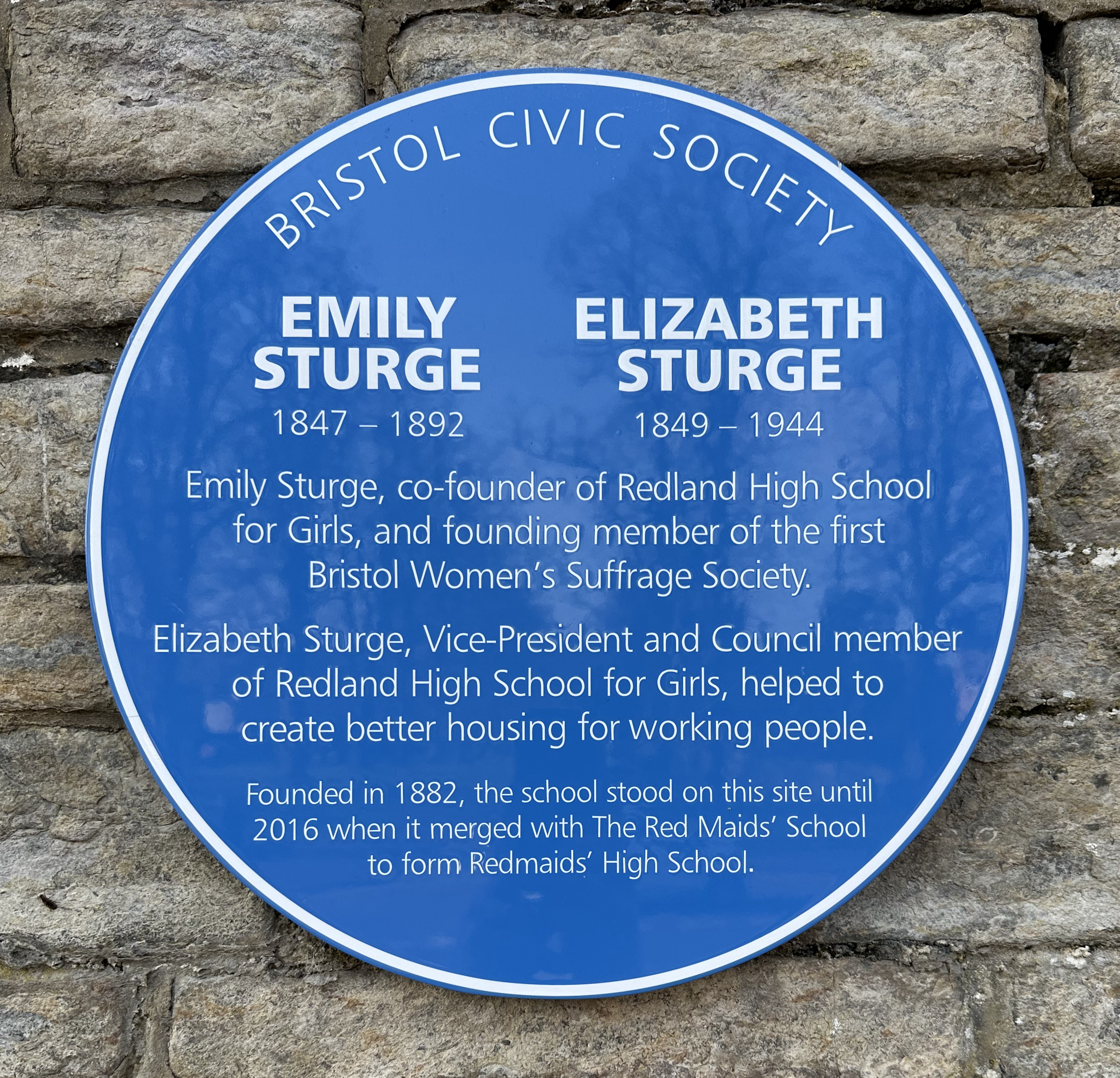
Blue Plaque to Sturge sisters at the former Redland High School for Girls

There are three Blue Plaques in Bristol commemorating Elizabeth's life and work.

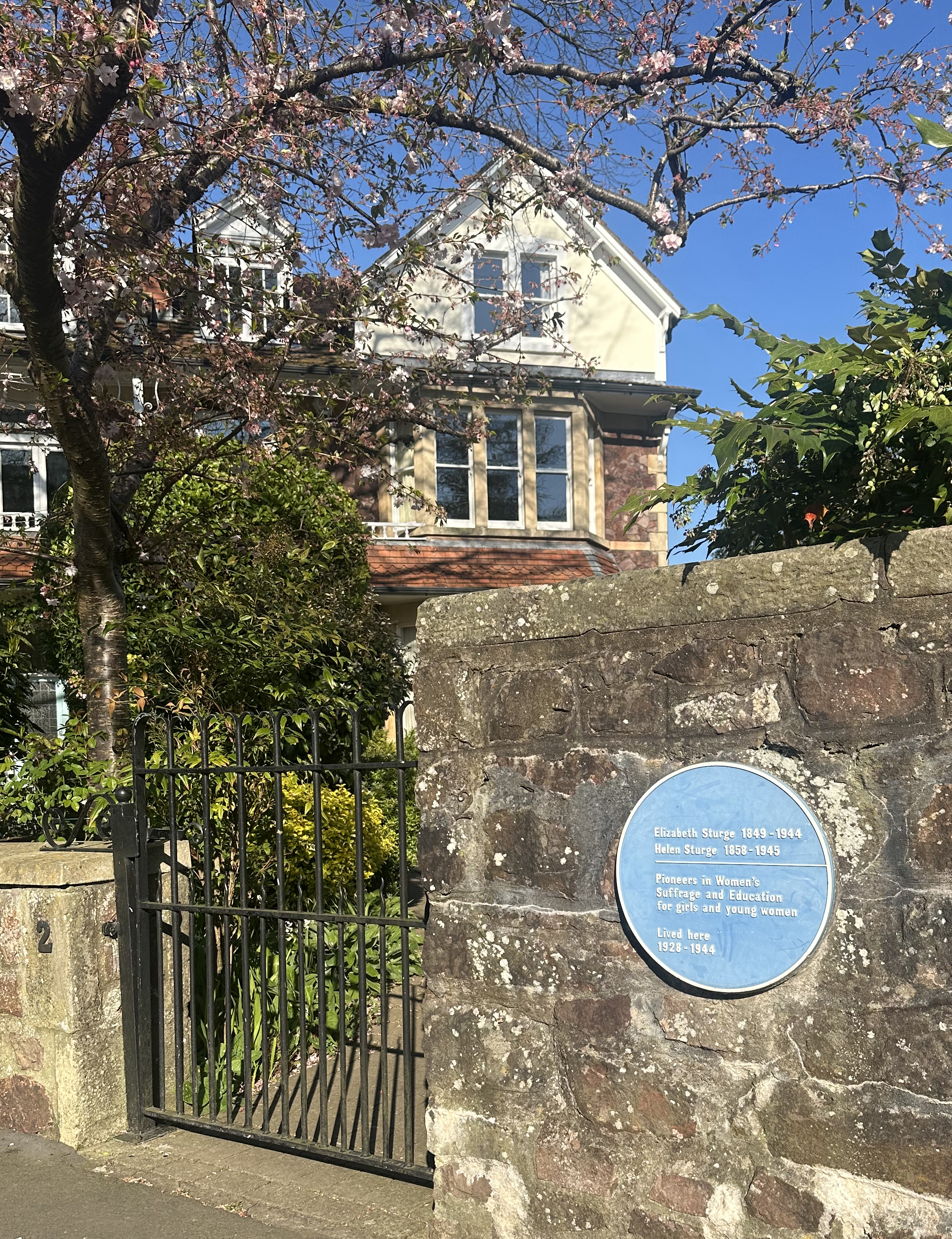
'Rose-Lea', 2 Durdham Park, Bristol, where Elizabeth and Helen Sturge lived, 1928-44

A Blue Plaque on the house Elizabeth and her sister Helen Sturge M.D. (1858-1945) lived in at 2 Durdham Park, Redland. This remembers them as 'Pioneers in Women's Suffrage and Education for girls and young women. Lived here 1928-1944.'

In 2018 a Blue Plaque was unveiled at Redmaids' School in Bristol dedicated to Elizabeth Sturge and her sister Emily Sturge.

On 21 June 2021, a third Blue Plaque was unveiled on the gateway of the former Redland High School for Girls to Elizabeth and Emily. This states 'Elizabeth Sturge, Vice-President and Council member of Redland High School for Girls, helped to create better housing for working people.'
