= Rosie Millard =

British broadcaster and writer (born 1965)

Rosemary Harriet Millard OBE (born 17 April 1965) is a British journalist, writer and broadcaster.

Millard is Chair of Firstsite gallery in Colchester. She is Vice Chair of Opera North. Previous roles include Chair of BBC Children in Need, CEO of Children and the Arts, Arts Editor of the New Statesman and Arts Correspondent of the BBC, which she did for ten years (1994–2004). She was for a time a profile writer and columnist for the Sunday Times. She has been a theatre critic and property columnist and has also written regular comment columns for The Independent and i newspapers, and features, comment pieces and interviews for other national newspapers and magazines, including The Sunday Times, The Times, The Independent, New Statesman. and ArtReview.

She wrote the Mr and Mrs Millard marital column in the Body and Soul section of the Saturday Times. She was the arts editor and theatre critic for New Statesman. Millard has written four books, The Tastemakers: U.K. Art Now. She then wrote Bonnes Vacances , a comic travel memoir recounting a journey around the French Overseas Territories with her children, published by Summersdale, 2011. This was published along a series of TV documentaries on the same trip presented by Millard.

Her first novel The Square is a comic romp set in London. It was published in August 2015 by Legend Press. Legend Press published the sequel The Brazilian in 2017.

In 2014 Millard was made Chair of Hull City of Culture 2017. She was appointed OBE in the 2018 New Year Honours List for services in the arts to the city of Hull.

== Education ==
Millard was educated at Wimbledon High School, an independent school for girls in Wimbledon in southwest London. Millard is a graduate of Hull University, the London College of Communication and the Courtauld Institute. Millard was also educated at an American High School courtesy of the English-Speaking Union. Millard has been a Trustee of the Carnegie (UK) Foundation, Home Live Art and Modern Art Oxford. She has an Honorary Doctorate from the University of Hull.

== Life and career ==
Millard started her career as a junior researcher on Granada TV's daytime show "This Morning", before later becoming the arts correspondent for the BBC between 1995 and 2004.

On 20 June 2014 BBC News announced that Millard was to be appointed the role of chairwoman of the company running Hull's UK City of Culture activities in 2017. Having arrived at the University of Hull more than 30 years ago to study for a degree in English and Drama, arts specialist Millard maintains close links with the city.

On 18 January 2018, it was announced that Millard would become the chair of the BBC Children in Need. In February 2022 she became chair of the Philip Larkin Society.

In mid-2018 Millard announced on Twitter that she had undergone surgery to remove a large brain tumour. She later described her experience of diagnosis, operation and recovery in a blog on the website of the UK charity Brain Tumour Research.

== Family life ==
Millard lives in Islington, north London with her partner Alex Graham. She and her ex-husband Pip Clothier have four children. Millard is a marathon runner; she has run twelve marathons so far including the Great Wall of China Marathon and the six Abbott Marathon Majors. Her PB is 3.48. She has also been a Brownie leader and co-founded the Second South Islington Brownies.
