= Monica Allanach =

British actuary

- Born: Monica Christine Allanach; 1920/1; England
- Died: 14 September 2013
- Occupation: Actuary
- Known for: Being the first woman to be elected to the Council of the Institute of Actuaries

Monica Christine Allanach was a British actuary. She was the first woman to be elected to the Council of the Institute of Actuaries.

== Early life and education ==
Allanach's father died when she was four, and she was brought up by her widowed mother. She was educated at Wimbledon High School from 1931–1938. She was good at mathematics at school, and her teachers suggested that she become an actuary.

== Career ==
Allanach joined the Prudential Assurance Company in 1938 as an actuarial trainee. She qualified as an actuary in 1951. Women had been permitted to gain membership of the Institute of Actuaries for thirty years, but by 1951, less than one dozen women had become fully qualified. Allanach was moved to the male salary scale at Prudential in 1960, several years before the company introduced a single, non-gendered salary scale. She was appointed as the Deputy Actuary at the Prudential Assurance Company in 1970, thus becoming the first woman to reach management level at the company. In 1974 she was promoted to Actuary (UK), and held that position until her retirement in 1981.

She became a member of the council of the Institute of Actuaries in 1968, the first woman to be elected to the council. She was its honorary secretary from 1972 to 1974 and its vice-president from 1976 to 1979.

In 1977, Allanach was appointed by the Secretary of State for Trade, Edmund Dell, to his panel of insurance advisers. She retired from the panel in 1980.

In 1954 she and Pat Merriman and others began a series of informal meetings, such as tea-parties or wine and cheese parties, for the small minority of women in the profession, from which developed the Lady Actuaries Dining Club (LADS). LADS was wound up in 2011, by which time the Institute of Actuaries had its first woman president, Jane Curtis.

== Selected publications ==
- Allanach, Monica (May 1982). "Women Actuaries in the UK" (PDF). The Actuary. 16 (5): 4–5.

== Legacy ==
Allanach's writing, including a 1964 paper 'The treatment of expenses in the calculation of ordinary branch premiums', was required reading for exams at the Institute of Actuaries. In 2015, the Institute and Faculty of Actuaries held a Monica Allanach lecture.

== Personal life ==
Allanach was a member of the Friends of the Girls' Public Day School Trust, serving as its Honorary Treasurer from 1962–1972. She lived near Wimbledon, and had a keen interest in tennis. She did not marry, and believed that she would not have been promoted to senior positions had she done so. In July 1981, she was made a Freeman of the City of London.
