= Emily Sturge =

British women's education activist (1847–1892)

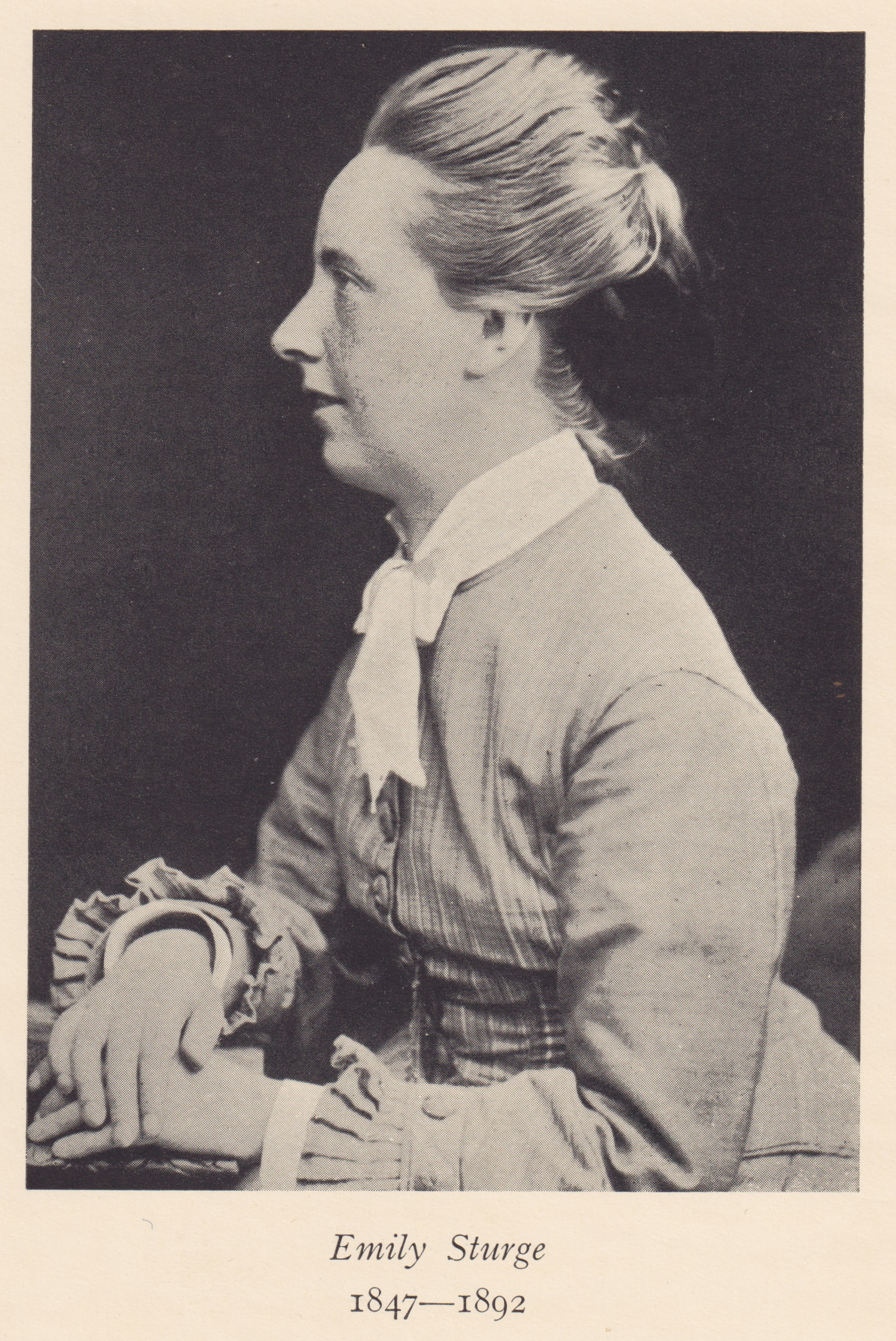
- by unknown
- Born: 20 April 1847; Cotham, Bristol, England
- Died: 3 June 1892 (aged 45); Cotham, Bristol, England
- Known for: campaigner for women's suffrage and education

Emily Sturge (20 April 1847 – 3 June 1892) was a British campaigner for women's education. She was secretary of the west of England branch of the National Society for Women's Suffrage.

== Life ==
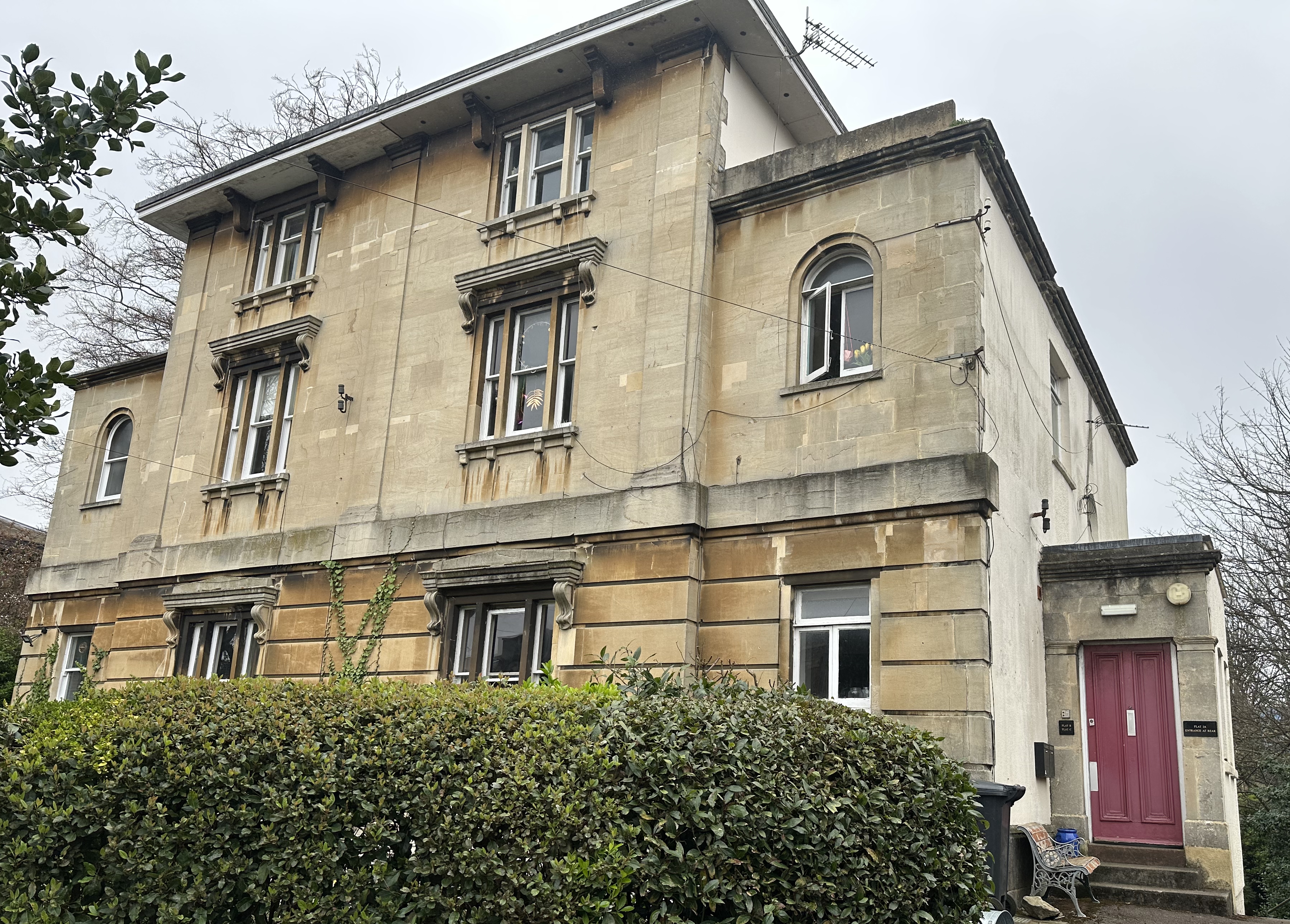
Highbury Villa (2 Cotham Road), Cotham

Sturge was born in 1847 in Highbury Villa, Cotham Road, Bristol. This is the property now known as 2 Cotham Road. She was the first of eleven children born to Charlotte Allen and William Sturge. The Sturge family were prominent amongst British Quakers and related by marriage to many of the other leading Quaker families. Her siblings were Margaret, Elizabeth, William, Mary, John, Charles, Guli, Helen Maria, Clement and Caroline. Five of the Sturge daughters, including Emily, would be involved in improving the prospects for women to gain a higher education, but Emily and Elizabeth were the leading lights. Emily's own education ceased at the age of fourteen but her younger sisters were able to go on to higher education.

She was a leader in the Bristol Women's Liberal Association where she campaigned for women's rights including by electoral reform.

University College in Bristol was founded in 1876, although it was not recognised as a university until 1909. The University College arranged lectures that women including the Sturge sisters could attend.

She and Elizabeth were involved in the creation of Redland High School for Girls which opened in 1882. They both served as governors.

She was a suffragist and became secretary of the west of England branch of the National Society for Women's Suffrage in 1878 after being a member since 1872 and the society members were regular visitors at her home. The society had been formed only a few years before at Matthew Davenport Hill's house.

Sturge was among the signatories of a supportive letter sent to the first meeting of the International Council of Women, which was held in 1888 in America. Other signers included Helen Priestman Bright Clark, Maria Colby, Margaret Tanner, Mary Estlin and Louisa Swann, all under the title "In the Fellowship of Womanhood."

== Death and legacy ==
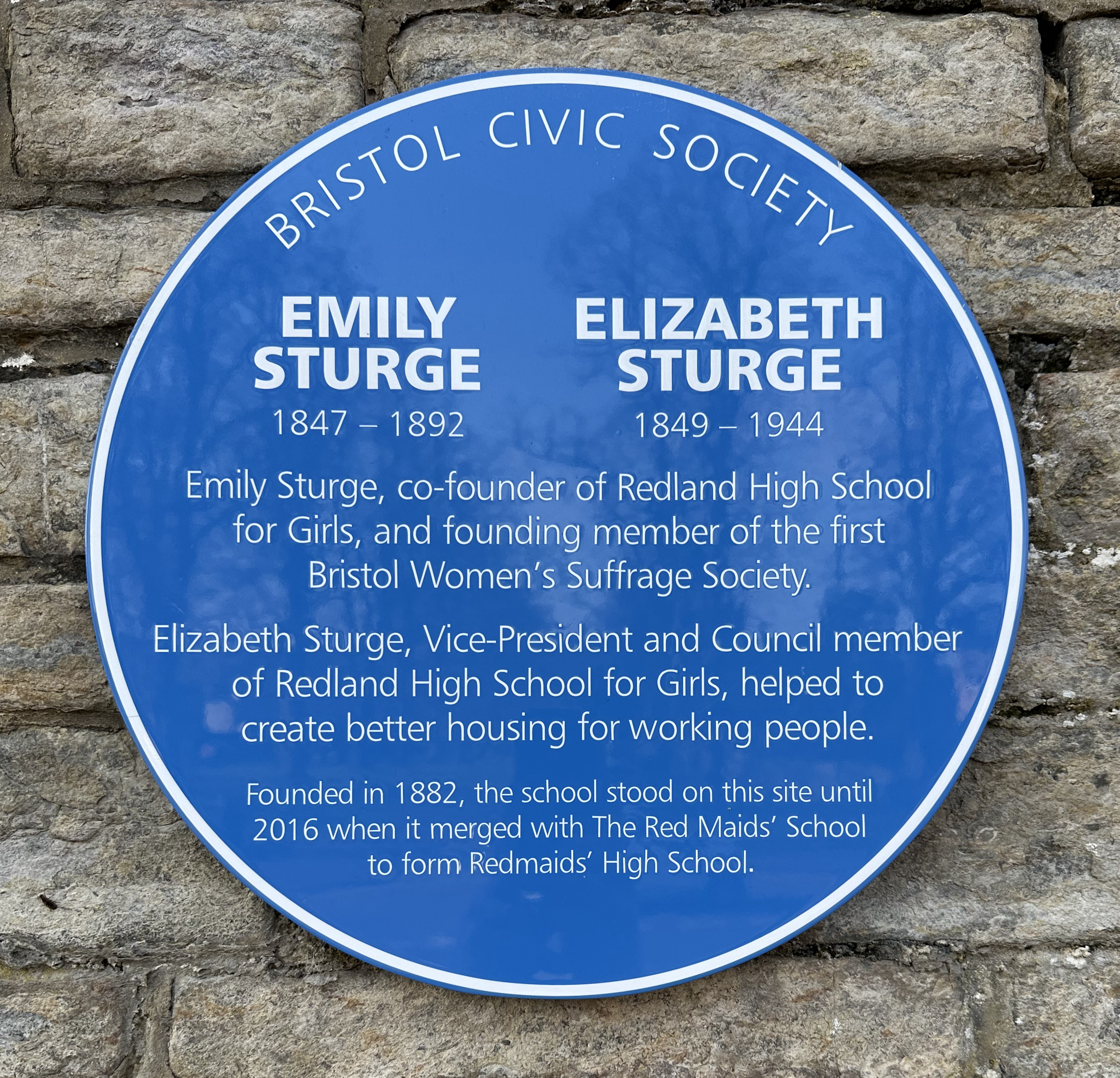
Blue Plaque to Sturge sisters at the former Redland High School for Girls

Sturge died in Cotham in 1892 after falling from a horse. An obituary was written by her aunt Matilda Sturge.

In 2018 blue plaques were unveiled commemorating Emily, her sister Elizabeth Sturge and Agnes Beddoe at Redmaids' High School. In 2021, another Blue Plaque was unveiled on the gateway of the former Redland High School for Girls, dedicated to Emily and Elizabeth .
