= Irene Scouloudi =

English historian and philanthropist (1907–1992)

Irene Scouloudi (2 April 1907 – 31 July 1992) was an English historian, editor and philanthropist and served as Honorary Secretary and General Editor of the Huguenot Society from 1951 to 1987. She was a fellow of the Royal Historical Society and an honorary fellow of the Institute of Historical Research.

== Early life and education ==
Scouloudi was born in Manchester on 2 April 1907 to Frank and Emma (née Eumorfopoulos) Scouloudi. Her father was a French citizen of Greek ancestry. She was educated at home before spending two years at Notting Hill and Ealing High School, and then gained a BA in history at the London School of Economics in 1931. In 1936, she gained an MSc in history, her thesis title being Alien Immigration into and Communities in London, 1558-1640.

== Selected publications ==
- Scouloudi, Irene, ed. (1985). Returns of Strangers in the Metropolis 1593, 1627, 1635, 1639. A study of an active minority. Huguenot Society of London.
- Scouloudi, Irene, ed. (1987). Huguenots in Britain and France (1st 1987 ed.). London: Palgrave Macmillan UK. ISBN 9780333396698.
- Hands, A.P.; Scouloudi, Irene (1971). French Protestant refugees relieved through the Threadneedle Street Church, London, 1681-1687. Huguenot Society of London.
