= Nellie Dale =

British school teacher (1865–1967)

Ellen Dale (14 February 1865 – 26 February 1967) was a British school teacher who created one of the earliest books on teaching reading.

The earliest school-based literacy education was started by Dale at Wimbledon High School from 1892 to 1909. Ms Edith Hastings, to whom Dale dedicated her book On the Teaching of English Reading, was headmistress of Wimbledon High School for Girls from 1880 to 1908.

Dale published several books, starting in 1898 with On the Teaching of English Reading (green cover) with J M Dent & Co., London, England. This book taught the alphabetic principle and phonemic awareness. She taught the voiced and unvoiced consonants, vowels and silent letters by using different colors (black, blue, red and yellow, and she had her students step out the syllables. She showed her students how to notice voiced and unvoiced consonants.

Walter Crane published the Readers under the title The Walter Crane Readers in 1899 with J M Dent & Co in London. Dale later moved her books (excluding her first one) to George Philip & Son Limited, London and then called them The Dale Readers.

The Steps to Reading was also her book. To complement it, Dale contemporaneously published The Steps to Reading (red cover), The Dale Readers First Primer (blue cover), The Dale Readers Second Primer (yellow cover) and The Dale Readers Infant Reader (green cover). In the United States, these books were also printed by D Appleton & Co.

Dale later published The Dale Readers Book I (brown cover), The Dale Readers Book II (pink cover) and a revised book entitled Further Notes on the Teaching of English Reading (green cover) covering her original books plus The Dale Readers Book I in 1902. She intended to print further books, but never did. Her mentor in all of this appears to have been the linguist Walter Rippmann MA (1869–1947) who published The Sounds of Spoken English and Specimens of English (1911) in her book On the Teaching of English Reading.

She also used a Tabulating Frame and Pricked Sounds for Embroidery, the latter are only found in the Toronto Public Library, no copy of the tabulating frame has been found.
