= Rachel Wang =

British film producer and director

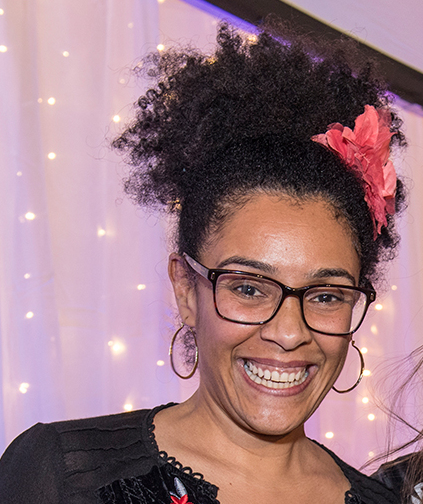
- Wang receiving the Women in Social Enterprise Award
- Education: Wimbledon High School; University of Bristol; University of Law
- Occupations: Film producer, director, social entrepreneur
- Known for: Co-founding Chocolate Films
- Awards: Honorary doctorate, Middlesex University (2017)

Rachel Wang is a British film producer and director known for her work with Chocolate Films, a film production house that brings disadvantaged young people into filmmaking and digital art. As of 2023, she is currently the digital trustee at the National Portrait Gallery.

== Education ==
Wang went to an all girls school, Wimbledon High School. She received an undergraduate degree from the University of Bristol (1996). Wang went on to do a postgraduate studies at the University of Law (1997 to 1999).

== Career ==
Wang co-founded Chocolate Films in 2001 as a non-profit organisation with the aim of bringing disadvantaged young people into filmmaking and digital art. Her workshop engages with over 3000 young people and disadvantaged adults each year. Wang is a trustee at the National Portrait Gallery, and she works as a digital trustee for the curatorial committee.

== Selected works ==
- Mark Currie and Rachel Wang. Afro Saxons.
- Rachel Wang, Mark Currie and Gareth Mitchell. The Road to Recovery.

== Awards and honors ==
Wang was voted Lead Entrepreneur of the Year for the 2015 Black British Business Awards. She received an honorary doctorate in business from Middlesex University in 2017. In 2018 Wang received the Black Women in Business Award for Social Enterprise of the Year. In 2019 Wang won Community Person of the Year from the Visionary Honours show.
