= Wimbledon High School =

Location
- Mansel Road; London, SW19 4AB; England; 51.4226°N 0.2107°W

Information
- Type: Private day school
- Mottoes: Ex Humilibus Excelsa ("From humble beginnings, greatness"); Stepping in, Striding out
- Established: in 1880, 144 years ago (in 2024)
- Local authority: Merton
- Department for Education URN: 102692 Tables
- Headmistress: Fionnuala Kennedy
- Gender: Girls
- Age: 4 to 18
- Enrolment: 1000~
- Houses: 4
- Colour: Green
- Alumnae: Wimbledonians
- Website: http://www.wimbledonhigh.gdst.net/

Wimbledon High School is a private girls' day school in Wimbledon, South West London. It is a Girls' Day School Trust school and is a member of the Girls' Schools Association.

== History ==
Wimbledon High School was founded by the Girls' Public Day School Trust (now known as the Girls' Day School Trust or GDST). It opened on 9 November 1880 at No. 74 (now No. 78) Wimbledon Hill Road with 12 students and Miss Edith Hastings as Headmistress, aged just 29. Over the next decade, the school roll grew to over 200 girls. The first lesson taught was on the subject of the apple. Soon after, the fruit was used as the emblem of the school. Every year on the school's birthday in November, pupils and staff eat apple-green cupcakes in memory of this.

Ethel Gavin became the head in 1908. During World War I, the school endured a difficult time, the head was in Germany at the time and was detained for some weeks. The timetable was suspended for older students as girls and teachers joined the war effort and made respirators for the troops. A fire broke out in 1917 and gutted the main building. The head, Ethel Gavin, who organised the recovery died in early 1918 from cancer. The girls were moved to a temporary location to resume their activities.

The new building was formally opened by old girl, the Duchess of Atholl, in October 1920 and it included a gymnasium and two new laboratories. The facilities have now been much expanded upon.

The school's currents sports fields, at Nursery Road (off Worple Road) were until 1922 the site of the All England Club, before it moved the Wimbledon Tennis Championship to its present location on Church Road. The acquisition of the playing fields was made possible by a successful fundraising campaign that raised £6000 from parents and alumnae.

The school was greatly affected by the Second World War. Pupil numbers fell as London was bombarded during the Battle of Britain. Under the Education Act 1944, the school applied for and was granted "direct grant" status. It chose to become private when the scheme was abolished during the 1970s.

A new junior school building was opened in 2000. New buildings were added such as a design and technology centre, new science labs and the Rutherford Centre for the Performing Arts, named after the actress Margaret Rutherford, an alumna of the school.

In 2022 a 3-year building project completed, known as Project Ex-Humilibus, from the school motto. The development included:

- a STEAM tower
- a Sixth form centre with bespoke spaces for Year 12 and 13
- the relocation of the dining halls
- a brand new assembly hall
- a "Playground in the Sky" - an enclosed play area for junior girls on the rooftop of the Assembly Hall

== Academic Results ==
Wimbledon High School is highly academic. Wimbledon High School girls usually achieve excellent results in A-level and GCSE exams and it's regularly listed extremely high in the league tables. The school is the recipient of several Times Educational Supplement (TES) independent school awards (known as the Oscars of Education) and nominations, including ones for Best Use of Technology, Inclusive School of the Year and Senior School of the Year.

2024 A-level results: A*s accounted for half of all grades and 31% of students achieved 3 A* grades or more. These represent the best results ever achieved by a cohort at Wimbledon High.

2024 GCSE results: 52.5% of grades were a 9, and 79.4% of grades were 9 – 8. Some 44% of students were awarded all 9s and 8s across a range of 23 subjects.

== Sports ==
WHS Sporting Grounds, Nursery Road

Wimbledon High School has a longstanding relationship with the All England Lawn Tennis and Croquet Club, the organisers of the Wimbledon Tennis Championship. The school's present sporting grounds at the nearby Nursery Road were the original home of the Wimbledon Championship and the site of the 1908 London Olympics tennis matches. Each year, multiple Wimbledon High School students are selected as ballgirls at the Championship.

=== Tennis ===
In 2023, student Hannah Klugman was the youngest ever player to qualify for a W100 tennis event at age 15 years 1 month and 22 days.

=== Rowing ===
Rowing is a very popular sport at Wimbledon High School. The school's Boat Club (WHSBC) was established by British world champion and Olympic silver medalist Gillan Lindsay. They can boast of numerous trophies and prestigious placements, including winning the National Schools' Regatta and qualifying for the Henley Royal Regatta.

== Headmistresses ==
- Miss Edith Hastings (1880–1908)
- Miss Ethel Gavin (1908–1918)
- Miss Mabel Lewis (1918–1939)
- Miss Kathleen Littlewood (1940–1949)
- Miss Marguerite Burke (1949–1962)
- Mrs Anne Piper (1962–1982)
- Mrs Rosemary Smith (1982–1992)
- Mrs Elizabeth Baker (1992–1995)
- Dr Jill Clough (1995–2000)
- Mrs Pamela Wilkes (2001–2008)
- Mrs Heather Hanbury (2008–2014)
- Mrs Jane Lunnon (2014–2020)
- Ms Fionnuala Kennedy (2020–present)

== Associated People ==
=== Notable former pupils ===
- Katharine Stewart-Murray, Duchess of Atholl (1874–1960)
- Sylvia Payne (1880–1976) – psychoanalyst
- Audrey Blackman, sculptor
- Dame Margaret Rutherford "Peggy" (1892–1972) – actress
- Judith Ledeboer (1901–1990) – architect
- Dame Mary Smieton (1902-2005) – civil servant and Secretary to the Ministry of Education
- Sheila May Edmonds (1916–2002) – mathematician and Lecturer at University of Cambridge
- Jean Aitchison (born 1938) – Professor Emeritus of Language and Communication, University of Oxford
- Professor Dame Louise Johnson (1940–2012) – biochemist and crystallographer
- Ilora Finlay, Baroness Finlay of Llandaff (born 1949)
- Bridget Rosewell (born 1951) – economist
- Sara Nathan (born 1956) – broadcast journalist & regulator
- Sasha Wass (born 1958) – barrister
- Michelle Paver (born 1960) – novelist
- Rosie Millard (born 1965) – journalist & broadcaster
- Samira Ahmed (born 1968) – news presenter
- Lara Croft (born 1968) – fictional video games character, heroine of the Tomb Raider series
- Afua Hirsch (born 1981) – writer & broadcaster
- Lizzy Pattinson (born 1983) – singer
- Amara Karan (born 1984) – actress (St Trinians)
- Georgina Sherrington (born 1985) – actress (The Worst Witch); winner of Young Artist Award for Best Performance in a TV Comedy Series
- Monica Allanach (died 2013) – actuary
- Rachel Wang - British filmmaker

=== Notable former teachers ===
- Nellie Dale was a teacher at Wimbledon who created her own basic reading program that used phonological awareness and phonics.
- Ethel Gavin head here during WW1
- Ada Wallas the socialist writer taught here briefly.
