= Penny Vincenzi =

British novelist (1939–2018)

- Born: Penelope Hannford; 10 April 1939; Bournemouth, Hampshire, England
- Died: 25 February 2018 (aged 78)
- Occupation: Novelist
- Spouse: Paul Vincenzi (m. 1960; died 2009)
- Children: 4 daughters

Penelope Vincenzi (née Hannaford; 10 April 1939 – 25 February 2018) was a British novelist, who wrote 17 novels and two collections of stories. Her book sales by 2014 amounted to over seven million copies.

== Early life ==
She was born Penelope Hannaford, on 10 April 1939 in Bournemouth, the daughter of Stanley George Hannaford (died 1985) and Mary Blanche Hannaford née Hawkey (died 1987) of New Milton, Hampshire. She was an only child, with "the most ordinary background you could possibly imagine". As a child, the family moved to Devon. She was educated at Notting Hill and Ealing High School.

== Career ==
In 1962, she started to work for the Daily Mirror as a secretary and, after a year, was working for the women's editor Marjorie Proops, who, knowing of her journalistic ambitions, let her help with research and small tasks.

Vincenzi was also a fashion journalist who worked for various publications, including the Daily Mirror and Vogue.

== Personal life ==
She met her future husband Paul Robert Vincenzi, an advertising executive, the son of Dr Julius Vincenzi of Earls Colne, Essex, when she was 19. They married on 27 May 1960, and had four daughters. He died from a brain tumour in 2009.

Penny Vincenzi died on 25 February 2018, aged 78.

== Publications (novels) ==
- The Compleat Liar (non-fiction, 1977)
- Old Sins (1989)
- Wicked Pleasures (1992)
- An Outrageous Affair (1993)
- Another Woman (1994)
- Forbidden Places (1995)
- The Dilemma (1996)
- Windfall (1997)
- Almost a Crime (1999)
- No Angel (2000)
- Something Dangerous (2001)
- Into Temptation (2002)
- Sheer Abandon (2005)
- An Absolute Scandal (2007)
- The Best of Times (2009)
- The Decision (2011)
- A Perfect Heritage (2014)
- A Question of Trust (2017)
