= Notting Hill and Ealing High School =

Location
- 2 Cleveland Road; Ealing, London, W13 8AX; England; 51°31′17″N 0°18′58″W

Information
- Type: Private day school
- Established: 1873
- Local authority: Ealing
- Department for Education URN: 101954 Tables
- Head: Allison Saunders
- Gender: Girls
- Age: 4 to 18
- Enrolment: 926
- Colours: Blue, Red, White
- Website: http://www.nhehs.gdst.net

Notting Hill and Ealing High School is a private day school for girls aged 4–18 in Ealing, London. Founded in 1873, it is one of the 26 schools that make up the Girls' Day School Trust. It has a junior department of 310 girls (ages 4–11) and a Senior Department of 600 girls (ages 11–18). The current head is Allison Saunders. Ms Bevan is head of the junior school.

== History ==
Since being founded in 1873, the school has changed both its location and its name. When the Girls' Day School Trust, then the Girls' Public Day School Trust, was formed in 1872, it established its first two schools in West London. In January 1873, the Trust opened Chelsea High School (a predecessor of Kensington Preparatory School) to serve the area immediately to the west of the centre of the city and nine months later, Notting Hill High School which was to serve families in the area to the north of Hyde Park. Harriet Morant Jones was the founding head who looked after ten pupils assisted by her sister. Harriet Jones retired in 1900. Controversially, Ethel Gavin was appointed instead of an internal heir apparent and resignations followed. Gavin was a "capable and experienced headmistress" until 1908 when she moved to the GPDST school at Wimbledon.

The school originally occupied premises in Norland Square but outgrew these and moved to Ealing in 1931 when it became known as Notting Hill and Ealing High School for Girls. Following the Education Act 1944 it became a direct grant grammar school in 1946. When the direct grant scheme was abolished in 1976, it became an independent school.

== Present day ==
The school numbers 926 girls in 2024/25. Entry to the school is by assessment normally at ages 4+, 7+, 11+ or 16+. In 2024, at A Level, 70% of entries were A*/A and 95% were A*-B. At GCSE, 91% of entries were grade 9-7.

In 2025, the school was included in the Top 25 schools in The Sunday Times' Parent Power Guide for Independent Schools. The Junior School won 'Best City Prep' in The Week's Independent Schools Guide: Best of the Best (Prep).

In 2024, the school won 'London Independent School' at the Independent Schools of the Year Awards and was a top-rated school in the Telegraph Money's value-for-money league table. It also won 'Charitable Work Champion' at the School House Magazine Awards. It was named as a Top 20 All-Girls' School for Cricket by The Cricketer Schools Guide in 2023, 2024 and 2025.

The Good Schools Guide reviewed the Senior School in 2023, saying: "Academic achievements are excellent, and these energetic, exuberant girls are definitely a force to be reckoned with." The Junior School review in 2024 said it had a "forward-thinking, buzzy environment with an 'informal, happy vibe' and a 'multitude of opportunities' for bright girls who are keen to learn."

In their last report, the ISI inspectors reported, "The quality of the pupils' academic and other achievements is excellent. Pupils are highly motivated to succeed and are exceptionally focused in their attitudes to learning."

== School fees ==
In 2024/25 fees are £6,142 per term (Junior School) and £7,965 per term (Senior School). Academic and Music Scholarships are awarded at 11+ and 16+ and there are further scholarships at 16+.

== Notable former pupils ==
- Achieng Ajulu-Bushell (b. 1994), Kenyan and British swimmer
- Margaret Alexander, Countess Alexander of Tunis (1905–1977), Viceregal consort of Canada, Châtelaine of Rideau Hall & Deputy Lord Lieutenant of Berkshire
- Professor Polly Arnold (b. 1972) Professor of Chemistry at the University of Edinburgh
- Ava Alice Muriel Astor (1902-1956), American heiress and socialite
- Barbara Ayrton-Gould (1886–1950), Labour politician and suffragist
- Sarah Badel (b. 1943), actress
- Angellica Bell (b. 1976), television presenter
- Frances Blogg (1869–1938), author and poet
- Mabel Haynes Bode (1864–1922), academic
- Dame Harriette Chick (1875–1977), protein scientist and nutritionist
- Diana Churchill (1909–1963), daughter of Sir Winston Churchill
- Sarah Churchill, Baroness Audley (1914–1982), actress
- Mary Collin (1860–1955), suffragist
- Agnes de Selincourt (1872–1917), missionary and educator
- Astra Desmond (1893–1973), contralto
- Frances Hermia Durham (1873–1948), civil servant
- Kathleen Mary Easmon Simango (1892-1924), Sierra Leonean missionary and artist
- Professor Beatrice Edgell (1871–1948), psychologist
- Katharine Esdaile (1881–1950), art historian
- Pippa Evans (b. 1982), comedian
- Margaret Fairweather (1901–1944), aviator
- Kathryn Flett (b. 1964), TV critic
- Alice Franklin (1885–1964), feminist
- Lynne Frederick (1954–1994), actress
- Abi Fry (b. 1981), violist with the band British Sea Power
- Jamila Gavin (b. 1941), author
- Rose Graham (1875–1963), historian
- Virginia Graham (1910–1993), writer, poet and translator
- Olivia Hallinan (b. 1985), actress
- Emily Hamilton (b. 1971), actress
- Bettany Hughes (b. 1968), historian
- Violet Hunt (1862-1942), author and literary hostess
- Konnie Huq (b. 1975), television presenter
- Rupa Huq (b. 1972), Labour Party Member of Parliament
- Aeta Lamb (1886–1928), suffragist
- Karolina Laskowska (b. 1992), fashion designer
- Nona Liddell (1927–2017), violinist
- Rebecca Lowe (b. 1980), sports broadcaster
- Margaret Mackworth, 2nd Viscountess Rhondda (1883–1958), suffragist
- Betty Miller (1910-1965), author
- Ernestine Mills (1871–1959), artist, writer & suffragist
- Jane Alice Morris (1861–1935), embroiderer
- May Morris (1862–1938), artist & editor
- Irene Petrie (1864–1897), missionary
- Rosalind Pitt-Rivers (1907–1990), biochemist
- Ruth Plant (1912–1988) architect & academic
- Eleanor Purdie (1872–1929), philologist
- Clara Rackham (1875–1966), suffragist
- Hannah Reid (b. 1989), musician with the band London Grammar
- Dame Angela Rumbold (1932–2010), Member of Parliament & Government Minister
- Hilda Runciman, Viscountess Runciman of Doxford (1869–1956), Liberal politician
- Dame Nancy Salmon (1906–1999), Women's Royal Air Force leader
- Dame Louise Samuel (1870–1925), suffragist & charity worker
- Professor Caroline Skeel (1872–1951), historian
- GB Stern (1890–1973), novelist
- Hannah Sullivan (b. 1979), poet
- Helena Swanwick (1864–1939), suffragist & pacifist
- Penny Vincenzi (1939–2018), novelist
- Nina Wadia (b. 1968), actress
- Emily Watson (b. 1967), actress
- Reverend Alison White (b. 1956), bishop
- Elizabeth Wiskemann (1899–1971), journalist & historian
- Professor Helen Wodehouse (1880–1964), philosopher & academic
- Frances Wood (1883–1919), chemist & statistician

== Notable former staff ==
- Edith Aitken, teacher
- Hertha Ayrton, engineer, mathematician, physicist and inventor
- Alice Cooper, teacher
- Ella Mary Edghill, translator
- Ethel Gavin head 1900-1908
- Harriet Morant Jones was the founding head
- Jane Ellen Harrison, classical scholar
- Winifred Holtby, journalist and novelist
- Katharine Jex-Blake, classical scholar
- Margaret Meyer, mathematician
- Marie Shedlock, story teller
- Katharine Wallas, politician
- Emily Ward, pioneer of childcare education
