= Katharine Wallas =

British politician

Katharine Wallas CBE
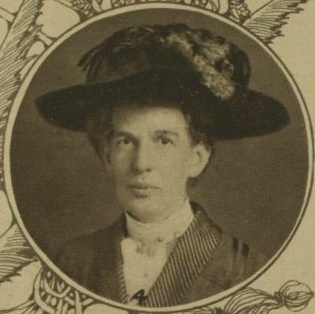

Alderman on the London County Council
- In office 1913–1934

Deputy Chair of the London County Council
- In office 1918/19

President of the Association of Assistant Mistresses
- In office 1899/1900

Personal details
- Born: 11 April 1864 Barnstaple, Devon, UK
- Died: 14 April 1944 (aged 80)
- Political party: Progressive Party
- Occupation: teacher and politician

Katharine Talbot Wallas (11 April 1864 – 14 April 1944) was a British politician.

Born in Barnstaple in Devon, Katharine was the daughter of Frances and Gilbert Wallace, the local vicar. Her older brother, Graham Wallas, became a prominent social psychologist. She was educated in Maida Vale before studying at Bedford College, London, and then Girton College, Cambridge, where she was president of the student amateur dramatic society and received one of the highest marks in mathematics. She left in 1887, long before the University of Cambridge awarded degrees to women, but in 1907 obtained an MA from Trinity College Dublin as part of the "Steamboat ladies" scheme, where female Oxbridge graduates were awarded degrees in recognition of the past learning.

After university, Wallas became a maths teacher at Notting Hill and Ealing High School, where her sister Mary was also teaching. In 1898, she left, and served in 1899/1900 as president of the Association of Assistant Mistresses. During this period, she also edited a poetry anthology, The Call of the Homeland, with Robert Pickett Scott, and served on the executive of Girton.

Wallas had an interest in the role of women in guiding local government's approach to education, serving on a committee of the National Union of Women Workers established to campaign for women's representation on councils. In 1909, she took over her brother Graham's place on the education committee of the London County Council. She was very successful in the role, and in 1913 was made an alderman for the Progressive Party on the council. She was deputy chair of the council in 1918/19, the first woman to hold the post, and remained on the council until 1934.

Furthering her interest in education, Wallas also served as vice-president of the Teachers' Registration Council, honorary treasurer of the Association of University Women Teachers, on the Burnham committee which set teachers' pay, and on the Unemployment Grants Committee.

Wallas was made a Commander of the Order of the British Empire in 1933.
