= Steamboat ladies =

Oxbridge women awarded degrees in Dublin

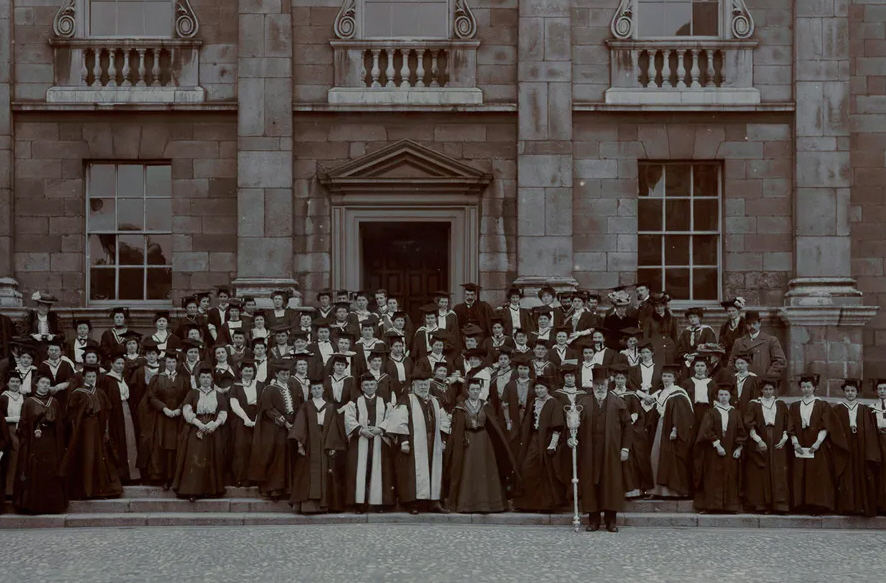
Steamboat ladies

"Steamboat ladies" was an informal nickname given to female students (estimated at 720 graduates) at the women's colleges of the universities of both Oxford and Cambridge, who were awarded academic degrees at Trinity College Dublin by incorporation, between 1904 and 1907, at a time when their own universities (Oxford and Cambridge) refused to confer degrees upon women. The name comes from the means of transport commonly used by these women to travel to Dublin for this purpose.

Trinity admitted female students in 1904. Unlike Oxford and Cambridge, where women had for some years been admitted to separate female colleges within the overall university, both men and women were admitted to the University of Dublin's only college (Trinity) and it was felt there would be no rationale to restrict successful female students from graduating to become members of the university like their male counterparts. In accordance with the long-standing formula of ad eundem mutual recognition that existed between Dublin, Oxford and Cambridge, Anthony Traill, the then-Provost of Trinity College, proposed that eligible female Oxbridge course completers be granted Trinity degrees, as was the case for men. The policy lasted from June 1904 to December 1907, when requirements for ad eundem awards were revised.

The Board of Trinity College thought that only small numbers of women would take up the offer to graduate and that they would be Irish women who had studied in Oxford or Cambridge colleges. In fact, by 1907 Trinity had granted degrees to some 720 "steamboat ladies".^{[3]} All had passed examinations at Oxbridge that would have earned them a degree if they were male.^{[3]} The women were predominantly students of Girton and Newnham Colleges, Cambridge and Somerville College, Oxford.^{[2]}

Money derived from the degree conferral fees that female graduates paid during this period was largely ring-fenced and was used to fund the purchase of Trinity Hall, an extramural hall of residence for female students, which opened in 1908.

== Notable steamboat ladies ==
- Julia Bell (1879–1979), human geneticist
- Dorothy Brock (1886–1969), educationist and headmistress
- Sara Burstall (1859–1939), educationist and headmistress
- Frances Cave-Browne-Cave (1876–1965), mathematician, metrologist and educationalist
- Frances Dove (1847–1942), teacher and headmistress
- Gertrude Elles (1872–1960), geologist
- Lilian Faithfull (1865–1952), teacher and headmistress
- Philippa Fawcett (1868–1948), mathematician and educationalist
- Florence Gadesden (1853–1934), teacher and headmistress
- Ethel Gavin (1866–1918), educationist and headmistress
- Frances Ralph Gray (1861–1935), teacher and headmistress
- Margaret Hills (1882 – 1967), teacher, suffragist organiser, feminist and socialist.
- Hilda Phoebe Hudson (1881–1965) mathematician who worked on algebraic geometry, in particular on Cremona transformations.
- Ruth Herbert Lewis (1871-1946), social reformer and folk-song collector
- Katharine Jex-Blake (1860–1951), classicist and teacher
- Lilian Knowles (1870–1926), historian and professor of economic history
- Penelope Lawrence (1856–1932), educator
- Ellen McArthur (1862–1927), economic historian
- Edith Major (1867–1951), educationist and headmistress
- Emily Penrose (1858–1942), classicist and educationalist
- Bertha Phillpotts (1877–1932), linguist, historian and educationalist
- Eleanor Rathbone (1872–1946), suffragist, social reformer and member of parliament
- Shena Simon (1883–1972), politician, feminist, educationalist and writer
- Eugénie Sellers Strong (1860–1943), archaeologist and art historian
- Margaret Tuke (1862–1947), academic and educator
- Katharine Wallas (1864–1944), politician and educationalist
- Mary Hay Wood (1868–1934), educationist

== See also ==
- First women admitted to degrees at the University of Oxford

== Sources ==
- Burek, Cynthia V.; Bettie Higgs (2007). The Role of Women in the History of Geology. Geological Society of London. p. 146. ISBN 978-1-86239-227-4..
- Parkes, Susan M. (2004). A Danger to the Men?: A History of Women in Trinity College Dublin 1904-2004. Lilliput Press. pp. 75, 90. ISBN 1-84351-040-5..
- Parkes, Susan M. "Steamboat ladies". Oxford Dictionary of National Biography (online ed.). Oxford University Press. (Subscription, Wikipedia Library access or UK public library membership required.)
- Susan M. Parkes, « Trinity College, Dublin and the “Steamboat Ladies”, 1904–1907 », in Mary R. Masson & Deborah Simonton, Women and higher education: past, present and future, Aberdeen University Press, 1996, 352 p. (ISBN 1857522605), p. 244–250.
- Furey, Molly (8 April 2020). "In 1904, the 'Steamboat Ladies' Kicked Off a Trinity Equality Battle. It's Still Going". The University Times.
