= List of principals of Queen Mary University of London =

This is a list of Principals of Queen Mary University of London. As of 2018, Queen Mary has had a total of 22 principals (11 of Westfield College, eight of Queen Mary College, and three since the merger of Queen Mary, Westfield, and Barts).

The current principal is Colin Bailey, a structural engineer, who became Principal in September 2017.

== Westfield College ==
Name	Held office
Constance Louise Maynard	1882–1913
Agnes de Selincourt	1913–1917
Anne W Richardson	1917–1919
Bertha Surtees Phillpotts	1919–1921
Eleanor Lodge	1921–1931
Dorothy Chapman	1931–1939
Mary Stocks	1939–1951
Kathleen Chesney	1951–1962
Pamela Matthews	1962–1966
Bryan Thwaites	1966–1984
John Varey	1984–1989

== Queen Mary College ==
Name	Held office
John Leigh Smeathman Hatton	1908–1933
Sir Frederick Maurice	1933–1944
Ifor Evans	1944–1951
Sir Thomas Percival Creed	1951–1967
Sir Harry Melville	1967–1976
Sir James Menter	1976–1986
Ian Butterworth	1986–1990
Graham J. Zellick	1991–1998

== Queen Mary University of London ==
Name	Held office
Sir Adrian Smith	1998–2008
Philip Ogden	2008–2009
Simon Gaskell	2009–2017
Colin Bailey	2017–present
