= List of academics of Queen Mary University of London =

The following is a list of notable academics past and present, who have taught or researched at Queen Mary University of London and at the institutions historically merged to form the current university.

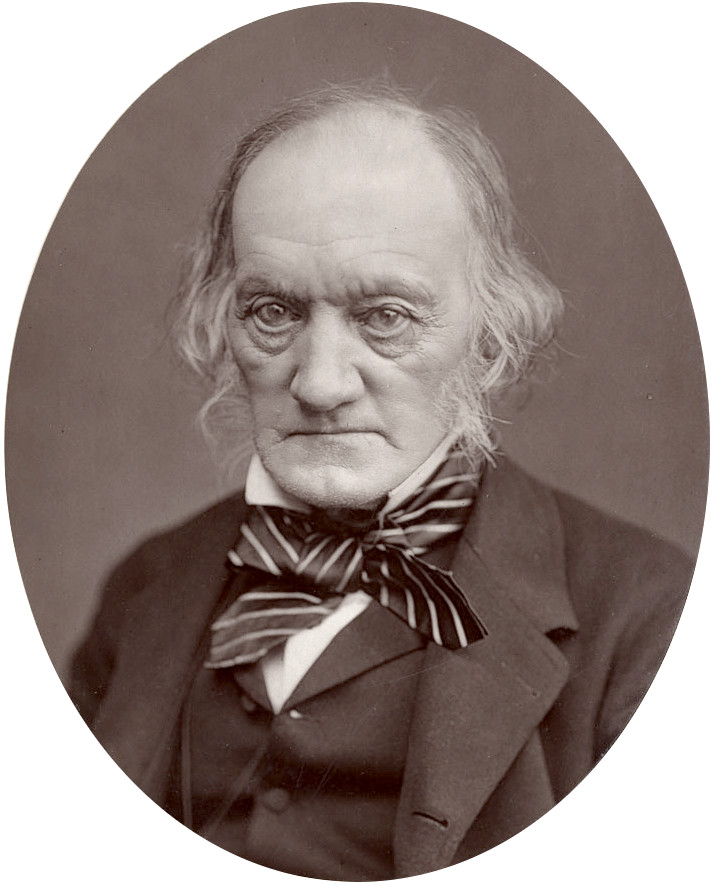
Sir Richard Owen, British biologist, comparative anatomist and paleontologist

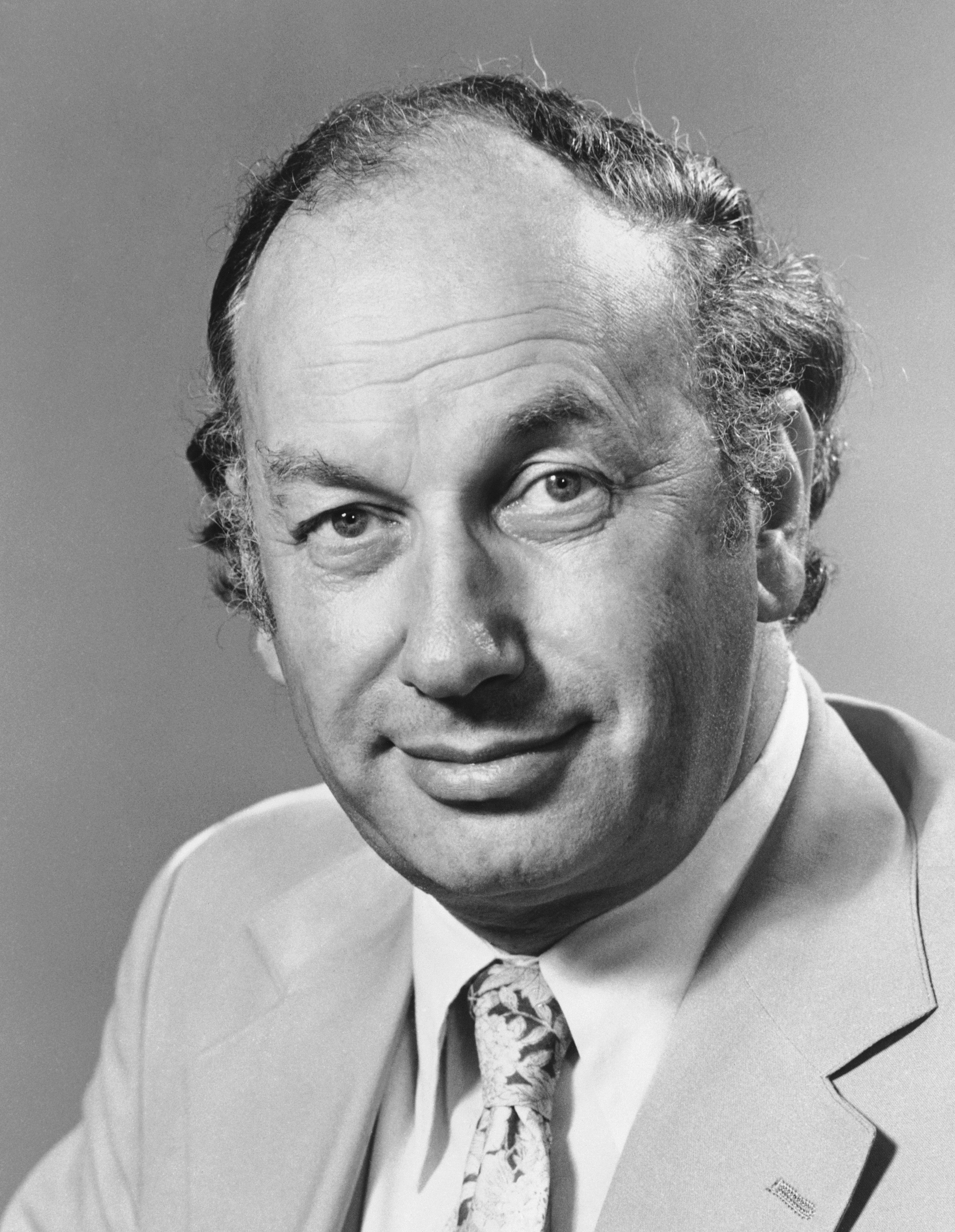
Sir John Vane, British pharmacologist, awarded the Nobel Prize in Physiology or Medicine in 1982

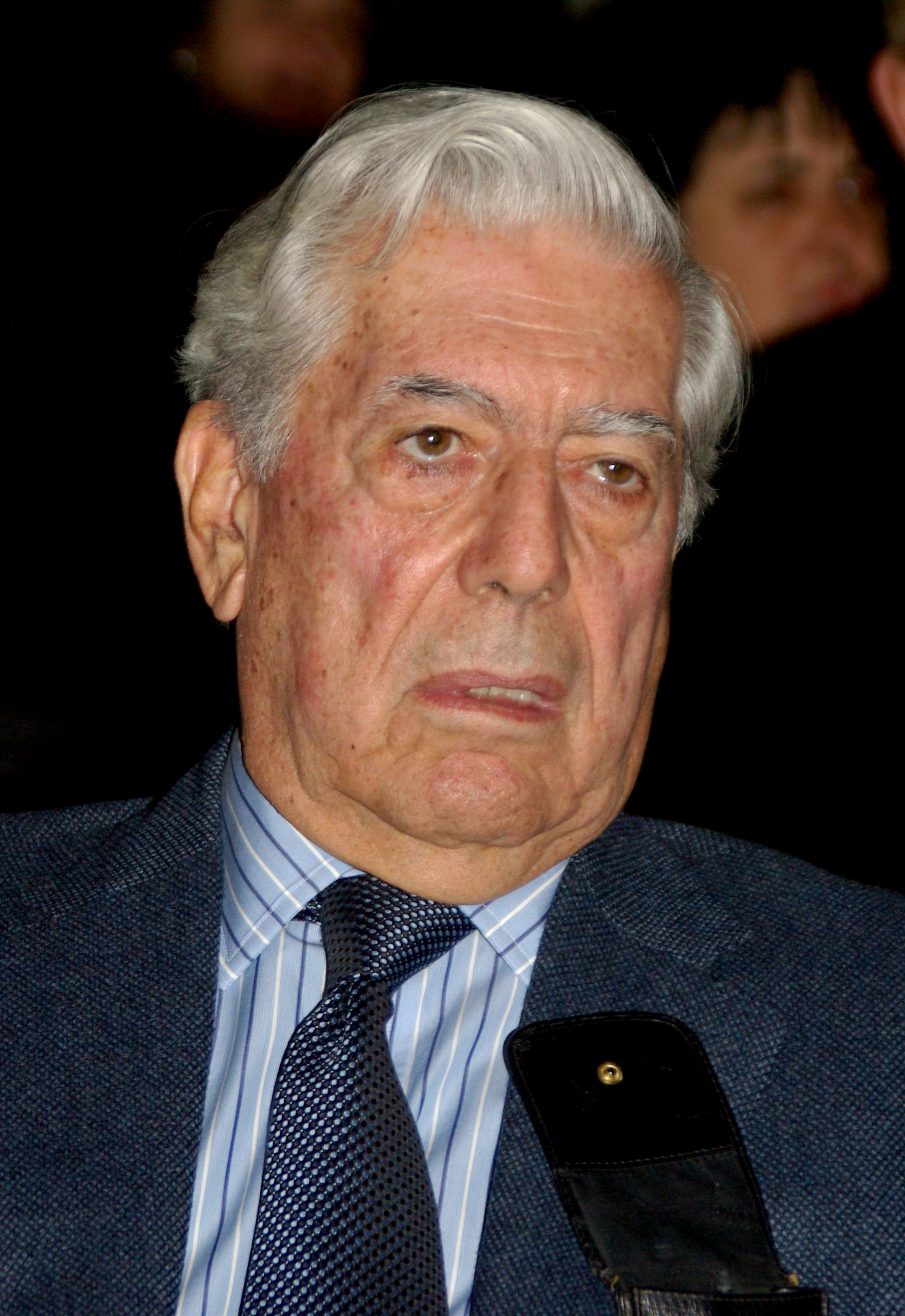
Mario Vargas Llosa, Peruvian writer, politician, and recipient of the 2010 Nobel Prize in Literature

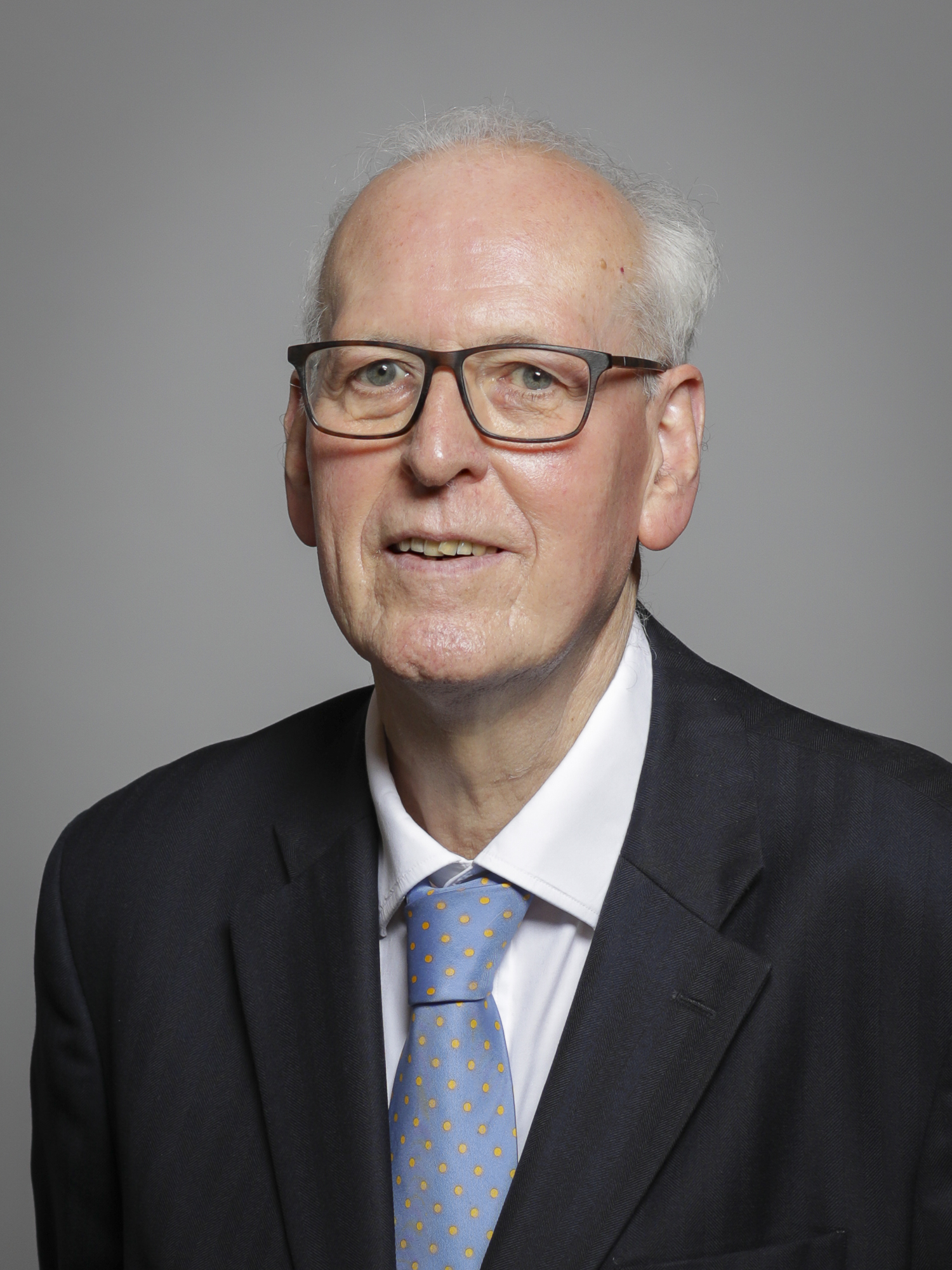
Lord Peter Hennessy, British contemporary and constitutional historian, author and broadcaster.

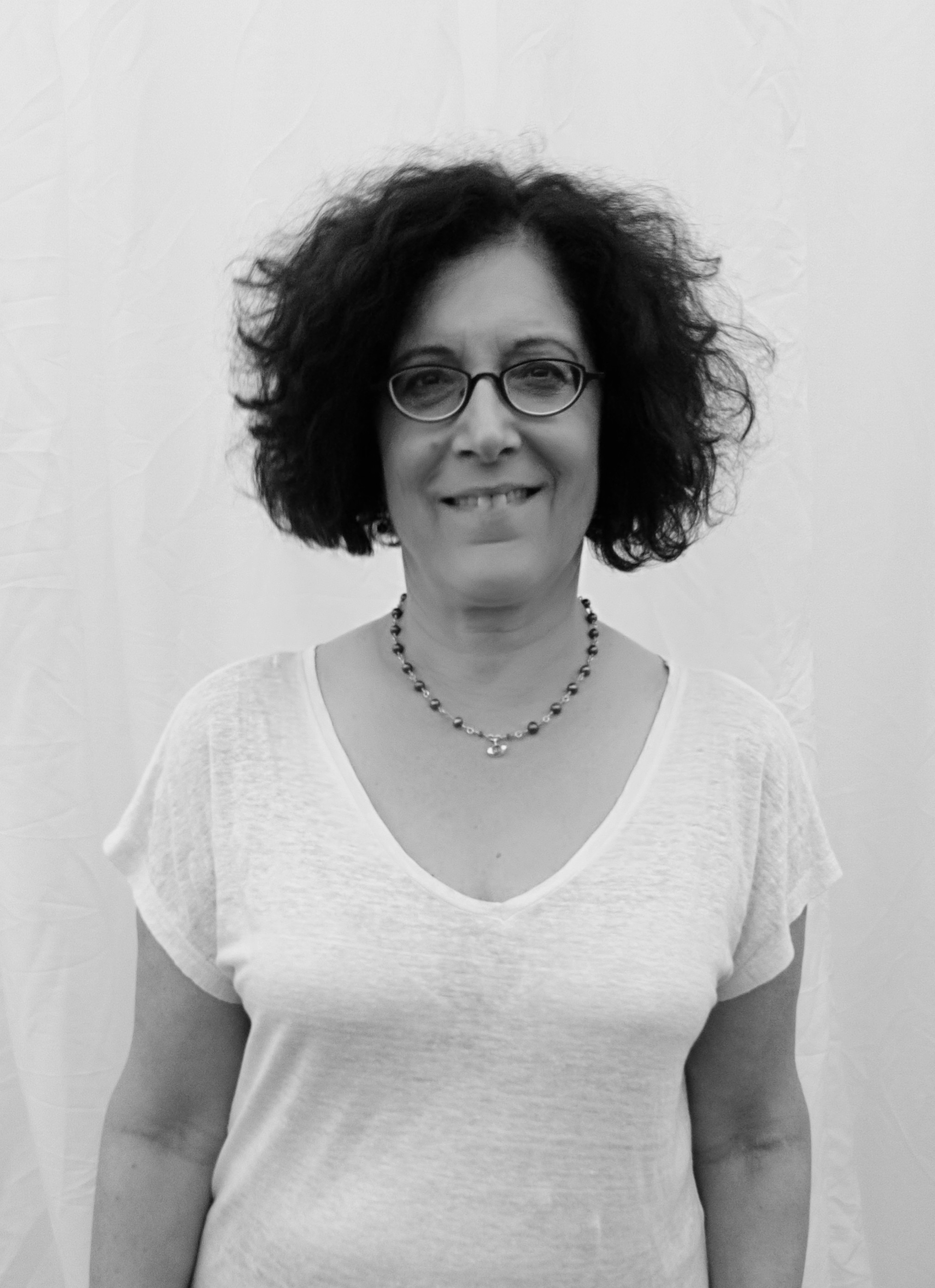
Miri Rubin, Israeli historian of early modern and medieval Europe, author.

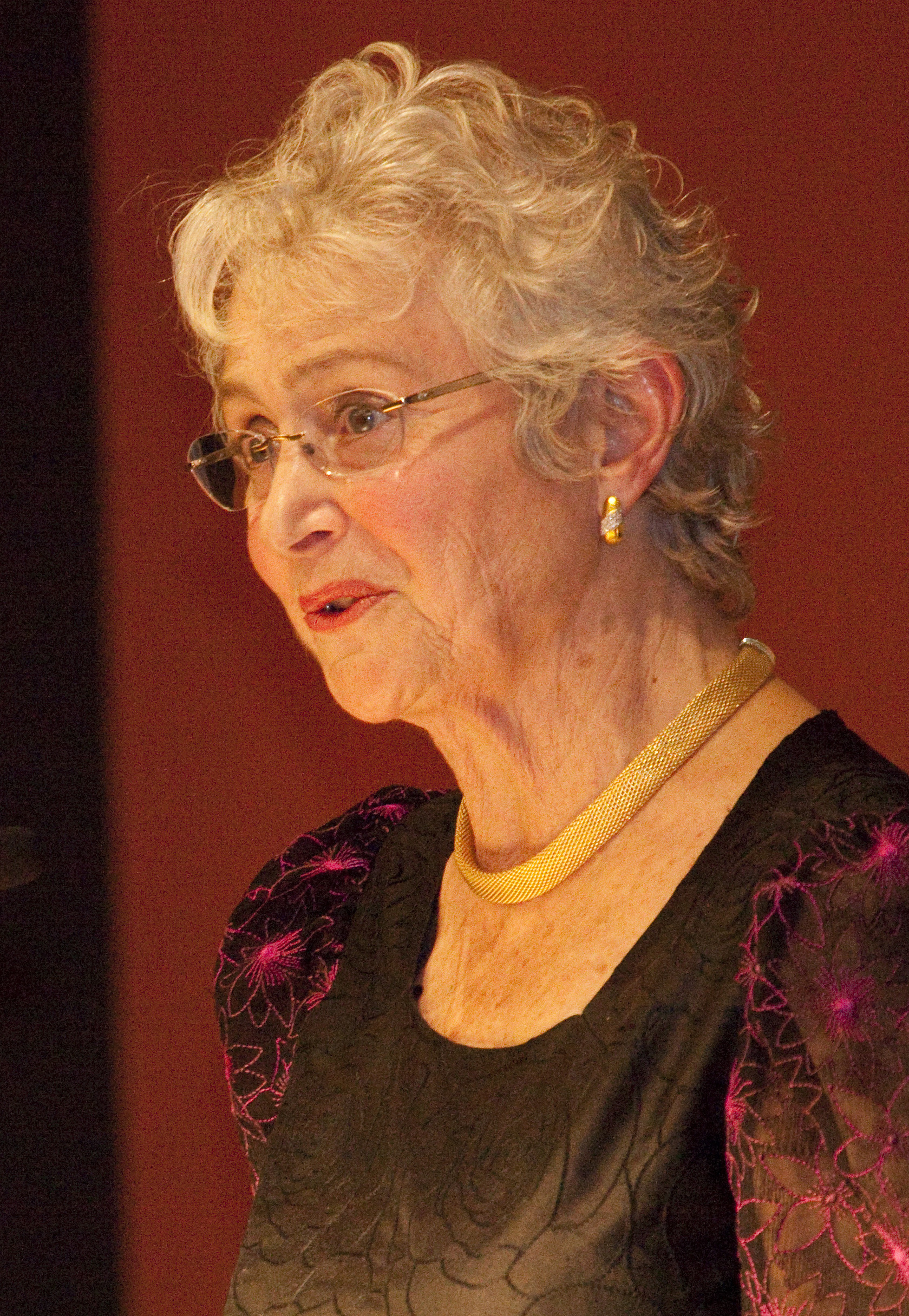
Lorna Casselton, British professor of genetics, Vice-President of the Royal Society.

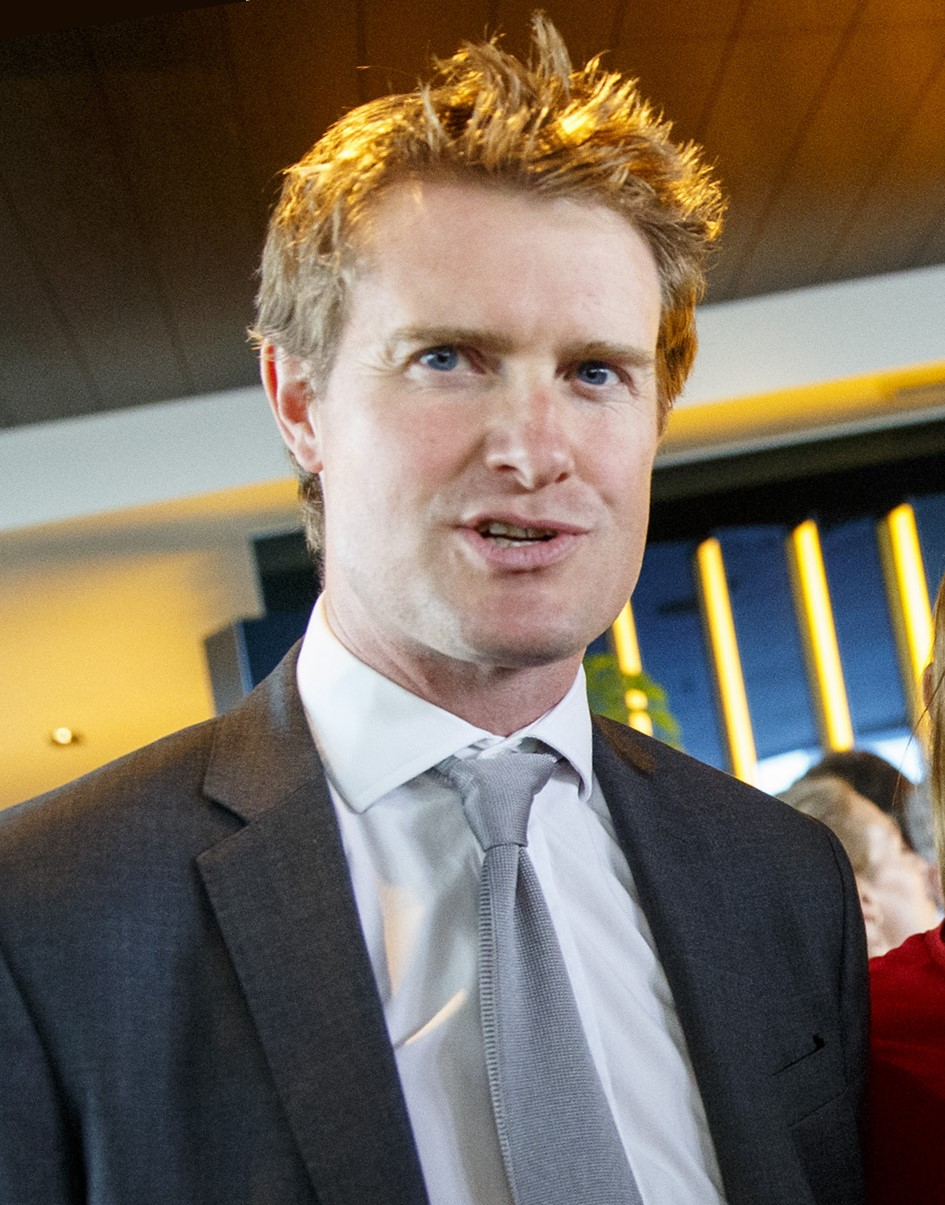
Tristram Hunt, British cultural historian, Labour MP, Director of the Victoria & Albert Museum.

== Sciences ==
=== Biologists ===
- Fran Balkwill - British oncologist, Professor of Cancer Biology, and author of children's books about scientific topics.
- Lorna Casselton – British biologist, Professor of Genetics at Queen Mary's College (1989-1991), later Vice-President of the Royal Society (2006-2010).
- Lars Chittka – German biologist, founded the Department of Psychology at Queen Mary in 2007
- Maud Godward - British botanist, scientist at Queen Mary College 1940 to 2002
- Marion Delf-Smith - British botanist, founded Westfield College's botany program in 1906
- Sir Richard Owen – British biologist, comparative anatomist and paleontologist
- Richard A. Nichols - British biologist, Professor of Evolutionary Genetics
- P. David Polly - American paleontologist, Lecturer at Barts and London and School of Biological Sciences 1997-2006
- Denise Sheer – British academic, Professor of Human Genetics

=== Chemists ===
- Donald Bradley – British chemist, Professor of Inorganic Chemistry (1965-1987).
- Michael Dewar – British chemist
- Sir Edward Frankland – British chemist
- Robin Ganellin – British chemist
- Michael Mingos – British chemist
- William Odling – British chemist who contributed to the development of the periodic table
- J. R. Partington – British chemist and historian of chemistry
- Matthew Todd - British chemist

=== Physicists and material scientists ===
- Edgar Andrews – British physicist and engineer, Emeritus Professor of Materials, having founded the Department of Materials at Queen Mary in 1967.
- Ted Bastin – British physicist and mathematician
- Sir Harshad Bhadeshia – Indian-British metallurgist
- William Bonfield – British material scientist, former Dean of Engineering at the then Queen Mary College, now Emeritus Professor of Medical Materials in the University of Cambridge.
- Sebastian Doniach – British-American physicist and professor at Stanford University
- Michael Duff – British physicist
- David James Dunstan - British physicist
- Michael Green – British physicist
- Gwyn Jones – British physicist and curator, Professor of Physics
- Peter Kalmus – British academic, Emeritus Professor of Physics
- Ian C. Percival – British theoretical physicist
- Harold Roper Robinson – British academic, Professor of Physics
- Sir Joseph Rotblat – Polish physicist, Professor of Physics, St Bartholomew's Hospital Medical College (1950–76); awarded the 1995 Nobel Peace Prize for efforts toward nuclear disarmament

=== Astronomers ===
- Guillem Anglada-Escudé - Catalan astronomer, at QMUL 2013 to 2019.
- Bernard Carr – British mathematician and astronomer, Professor Emeritus of Mathematics and Astronomy.
- Glenn White – British Astronomer, Professor of Physics and Astronomy.

=== Engineers ===
- Teresa Alonso-Rasgado - Mexican bio-engineer, a Professor of Mechanical Engineering and Dean for Global Engagement in the Faculty of Science and Engineering.
- Colin Bailey - British structural and fire safety engineer, who became the President and Principal of Queen Mary University of London in September 2017. Previously, Deputy President and Deputy Vice-Chancellor at the University of Manchester.
- Peter Clarricoats – British microwave engineer
- Graham Dorrington – British aeronautical engineer, subject of The White Diamond
- George Hockham – British engineer, co-pioneer of optical fibres for long-distance communications systems
- Sir Alistair MacFarlane – British electrical engineer
- Alec David Young – British academic, Professor of Aeronautical Engineering

=== Earth scientists ===
- David Drewry – British glaciologist and geophysicist
- Michael Russell - geologist

=== Mathematicians ===
- Deborah Ashby - British medical statistician. Now Director of the School of Public Health and Chair in Medical Statistics and Clinical Trials at Imperial College London.
- Rosemary A. Bailey – Professor Emerita of Statistics.
- Ginestra Bianconi - Italian mathematician, Professor of Applied Mathematics at QMUL since 2019, known for her work on statistical mechanics, network theory, multilayer and higher-order networks, and in particular for the Bianconi–Barabási model of growing of complex networks and for the Bose–Einstein condensation (network theory) in complex networks. She is the editor-in-chief of Journal of Physics: Complexity.
- Eileen Brooke - British medical statistician. Completed BSc in maths (1926), followed by MSc (1929) at the East London College. Completed PhD in maths (1952) at Queen Mary's College. Specialised in mental health statistics, undertaking work for the World Health Organization.
- Peter Cameron – Australian mathematician. Professor of Mathematics at QMUL (1987-2012), now Professor Emeritus.
- Karl W. Gruenberg – British mathematician
- Vito Latora – British mathematician
- Shahn Majid – British mathematician
- Sir Adrian Smith – British mathematician

=== Computer scientists ===
- Samson Abramsky - British computer scientist, Professor of Computer Science at UCL, previously the Christopher Strachey Professor of Computing at the University of Oxford, from 2000 to 2021. Honorary fellow at QMUL, having completed his PhD there.
- Jade Alglave - French computer scientist, now a Professor of Computer Science at UCL.
- Kevin Beurle - British space scientist and programmer who played a key role in the Cassini–Huygens mission to study Saturn and its moons. Died in 2009 in a hot air balloon crash.
- Richard Bornat - British computer scientist, Professor Emeritus of Computer Scientist at the University of Middlesex.
- Mark Jerrum – British computer scientist and computational theorist
- Peter Landin – British academic, Professor of Theoretical Computer Science
- Ursula Martin – British computer scientist, the first female professor at the University of St Andrews since its foundation in 1411
- David Turner – British computer scientist

=== Zoologists ===
- John Dennis Carthy – British zoologist

== Medicine ==
=== Physicians ===
- Sir Archibald Garrod – British physician who pioneered the field of inborn errors of metabolism
- Samuel Gee – British physician and paediatrician; published the first complete modern description of the clinical picture of coeliac disease
- Trisha Greenhalgh – British medical doctor
- William Harvey – British physician at Barts; discovery of circulation of blood
- Ian Jacobs – British academic, Professor of Gynaecological Cancer
- James Parkinson – British medical doctor, activist, discovered Parkinson's disease
- Dame Lesley Rees – British academic, Emeritus Professor of Chemical Endocrinology
- Anne Szarewski, British cancer researcher
- Sir John Vane – British pharmacologist, awarded the Nobel Prize in Physiology or Medicine in 1982
- Karen Vousden – British academic, Professor of Genetics
- Sir Nicholas Wald – British medical researcher
- Sir Robert Watson – British academic, Professor of Environmental Science
- Robert Winston, Baron Winston – British academic, pioneer of in vitro fertilisation, and a Labour Party member of the House of Lords
- Sir Nicholas Wright – British academic, Professor of Histopathology, Barts and the London School of Medicine and Dentistry, Queen Mary University of London

=== Surgeons ===
- John Abernethy – British surgeon, lecturer of St. Bartholomew's Hospital; founder of the Medical College of St Bartholomew's Hospital
- Karim Brohi - British surgeon, Professor of Trauma Sciences at QMUL, director of the London Major Trauma Network.
- Ajay Kakkar, Baron Kakkar – British surgeon, Professor of Surgery at University College London, and a cross-bench member of the House of Lords

=== Psychiatrists ===
- W. Ross Ashby – British psychiatrist and pioneer in cybernetics, the study of complex systems
- Elaine Murphy, Baroness Murphy – British politician, cross-bench member of the House of Lords; Professor of Old Age Psychiatry, Queen Mary University of London (1995–2006)

=== Medical scientists ===
- Stephen Bustin - British scientist, Professor of Molecular Sciences at QMUL (2004-2012). Formerly a lecturer and reader in molecular science at Barts. Specialist in the study and research on polymerase chain reactions.

== Arts ==
=== Literature ===
- John Barrell - British scholar of eighteenth and early nineteenth century studies, Professor (later Professor Emeritus) of English at QMUL.
- Claus Bock - professor of German studies, a lecturer at the then Queen Mary College (1958), then reader (1964), and finally professor of German at Westfield College (1969).
- Malcolm Bowie - British Professor of French Language and Literature at Queen Mary College (1976–92), later Marshal Foch Professor of French Literature and Fellow of All Souls College, Oxford (1992-2002) and Master of Christ's College, Cambridge from 2002 to 2006.
- Kathleen Chesney - British scholar of medieval French literature, principal of Westfield College from 1951-1962
- Sidney Lee – British academic, Professor of English.
- Mario Vargas Llosa – Peruvian writer, politician, and recipient of the 2010 Nobel Prize in Literature Formerly a visiting professor at QMUL.
- Tara McCormack – British academic and author
- Jacqueline Rose – British academic, Professor of English.

=== Film and performance studies ===
- Annette Kuhn – British academic, Emeritus Professor of Film Studies
- Lois Weaver – British academic, Professor of Contemporary Performance

=== Language and linguistics ===
- Marian Hobson – British academic, Professor of French from 1992 to 2005.
- David Adger - British academic, Professor of Linguistics, Adger served as president of the Linguistics Association of Great Britain from 2015 to 2020.

== Humanities ==
=== Historians ===
- Fay Bound Alberti - British cultural historian of gender, emotion and medicine. Professor of Modern History and UKRI Future Leaders Fellow at King’s College London, Honorary Senior Research Fellow, co-founder of the Center for the History of Emotions at QMUL.
- Thomas Asbridge - British historian of The Crusades.
- Sir Christopher Bayly – British historian who specialised in British Imperial, Indian and global history. From 1992 to 2013, he was Vere Harmsworth Professor of Imperial and Naval History at the University of Cambridge. He died in 2015.
- Stanley Bindoff - British historian, specialist on the Tudor period, the first Professor of History at the then Queen Mary College. Died 1980.
- David Blackbourn - British historian, specialising in modern German and European history. Lecturer at Queen Mary from 1976 to 1979. Currently the Cornelius Vanderbilt Distinguished Chair of History at Vanderbilt University, previously the Coolidge Professor of History at Harvard University.
- Jim Bolton - British medieval economic historian, a member of Queen Mary since 1965. A Professor Emeritus of History since retiring from teaching in 1994, he remains a professorial research fellow.
- Richard Bourke - Irish historian, Professor of Political Thought at the University of Cambridge since 2018, previously Professor of the History of Political Thought at Queen Mary.
- Jerry Brotton - British historian, PhD from QMUL (1995), later lecturer (2003) and then Professor of Renaissance Studies (2007) at QMUL.
- Alan Deyermond – British historian
- Felipe Fernández-Armesto – British historian
- Peter Hennessy, Baron Hennessy of Nympsfield – British historian, and a cross-bench member of the House of Lords
- Tristram Hunt – British politician and historian
- Julian Jackson – British historian
- Lisa Jardine – British academic, Professor of Renaissance Studies
- Colin Jones – British academic, Professor of History
- H. R. Loyn – British historian
- Frederick Maurice – British general and historian
- Miri Rubin – British academic, Professor of Early Modern History
- Charles Saumarez Smith – British art historian
- Quentin Skinner – British academic, Professor of the Humanities
- Gareth Stedman Jones - British historian, Professor of the History of Ideas at QMUL from 2010 onwards
- Barbara Taylor - Canadian and British historian, Professor of the Humanities
- Donald Sassoon Emeritus Professor of Comparative European History

=== Philosophers ===
- Keith Ansell-Pearson – British philosopher, specialising in the work of Friedrich Nietzsche, Henri Bergson and Gilles Deleuze. He is currently Professor of Philosophy at Warwick University.
- Jeremy Jennings – British political theorist and historian of political thought, currently Professor of Political Theory at King's College London. Professor of Political Theory

== Social Sciences ==
=== Lawyers and jurists ===
- Peter Alldridge - British lawyer, currently the Drapers Professor of Law at QMUL, and Fellow of the Academy of Social Sciences
- William Blair - British jurist, former High Court judge, since 2017 Professor of Financial Law and Ethics at Queen Mary's the Centre for Commercial Law Studies
- Michael Blakeney - Australian legal scholar, Winthrop Professor of Law at the University of Western Australia, former Director of Queen Mary's Centre for Commercial Law Studies
- Roger Cotterrell – British legal scholar
- Sir Ross Cranston – British lawyer, High Court judge, formerly academic lawyer and Labour Party politician
- Peter Duffy – British barrister
- Daniel Friedmann – Israeli lawyer, Minister of Justice of Israel, 2007–2009
- Dame Hazel Genn – British legal scholar, Dean of the Faculty of Laws and Professor of Socio-Legal Studies at University College London
- Eric Heinze – British legal scholar
- Phoebe Okowa - Member of the International Law Commission, legal scholar

=== Economists, financiers, and business people ===
- Richard Baillie - British–American economist and statistician who is currently the A J Pasant Professor of Economics at Michigan State University and a part time professor at King's College, London.
- Victor Bulmer-Thomas - British economist, lecturer in Development Economics at Queen Mary's College (1978), later Reader in Latin American Economics (1988) and Professor of Economics (1990). Later Director of the Institute of Latin American Studies (1992-1996) and Director of Chatham House (2001-2006).
- David Currie, Baron Currie of Marylebone – British economist specialising in regulation, and a cross-bench member of the House of Lords
- Sanjeev Goyal – Indian economist
- Maurice Peston, Baron Peston – British academic, Professor of Economics, and a Labour Party member of the House of Lords
- Martin Weale – British academic, Professor of Economics

=== Political scientists ===
- Tim Bale – British political scientist. Professor of Politics at QMUL, previously a Professor of Politics at the University of Sussex and a deputy director of UK in a Changing Europe.
- Philip Cowley – British political scientist
- Patrick Diamond – British policy advisor
- Toby Dodge – British political scientist
- Catherine Fieschi - Franco-British political analyst, academic, and author. Former director of Demos (2008). Established the Global Policy Institute at QMUL in 2019.
- John Rentoul – British journalist
- Ken Young – British academic in public policy studies
- Trevor Arthur Smith, Baron Smith of Clifton – British politician and academic, and a Liberal Democrat member of the House of Lords

=== Social scientists and sociologists ===
- Nicholas O'Shaughnessy – British academic, Professor of Marketing and Communication

=== Educators ===
- David Mowbray Balme - former decorated RAF bomber pilot, classicist, reader (1957-1965) and later Professor of Classics (1965-89) at QMUL, previously the first principal of University College of the Gold Coast, the forerunner of the University of Ghana.
