= Alldridge =

Alldridge is a surname. Notable people with the surname include:

- Peter Alldridge, British lawyer
- William Alldridge (1879–1942), American machinist
