= Fanny Metcalfe =

Headmistress

- Born: 1 February 1829; Roxton, Bedfordshire, England
- Died: 30 May 1897 (aged 68); Marylebone, London, England

Fanny Metcalfe (1 February 1829 – 30 May 1897) was a pioneering educator who set up a school for girls, and was involved in setting up more than one women's college.

== Early life and education ==
Fanny Metcalfe was born on 1 February 1829 to Charles James and Elizabeth Metcalfe of Roxton House, Roxton, Bedfordshire, United Kingdom. She had an older sister, Anna Sophia, and at least one brother. She was educated both at home and in Berlin. She and her sister were sent there in c. 1850 to improve their language skills and to assist them in learning the skills necessary to earn a living. With their mother, the sisters founded a school, "Highfield", in Hendon by renting a villa and opening a boarding school in 1858. Within 5 years they moved to larger purpose-built premises. Soon it was one of the top schools for young ladies. Alumnae included Ida Margaret Graves Poore and Blanche Athena Clough.

== Girton College ==
Metcalfe was determined to provide excellent education for women at all levels, and with her sister's support went on to work on the setting up Hitchin College in 1869, which later became Girton College, Cambridge. She worked with Emily Davis, whose idea it was. They had met as a result of her involvement with the London Association of Schoolmistresses.

Metcalfe was responsible for advising on the curriculum and disciplinary issues. These were her areas of expertise at Highfield. She also recruited students for the new college. In the early days her connection to the college was informal, but in 1869 she was appointed to the executive committee. Her experience with logistics meant that she also contributed on the planning of their buildings and gardens. Conscious that a degree course would be more difficult than the secondary education the students were used to, Metcalfe pushed for improved health care, defined tutorials and developing processes to assist the women facing the new challenge.

== Later life ==
In 1882 Metcalfe went on to assist in the creation of Westfield College in London, which was headed by a Girton College alumna, Constance Maynard. Both Metcalfe and her sister Anna sat on the Westfield council at various times, and the college was located a short distance from Highfield. Metcalfe had poor health in later life but remained involved and active until she died on 30 May 1897 in Marylebone, London. She was buried in St Mary's Church, Hendon. Alumnae from Highfield school set up a prize for medieval and modern languages in her memory.
