= June Milne =

British historian and publisher (1920–2018)

- Born: 22 June 1920; Melbourne, Australia
- Died: 5 June 2018 (aged 97); Norwich, England
- Education: Westfield College, University of London
- Occupations: Historian and publisher
- Years active: 1967–2024
- Known for: Editorial assistant and literary executor of Kwame Nkrumah
- Spouse: Evander (Van) Milne (m. 1944)
- Children: 2

June Milne (22 June 1920 – 5 May 2018) was a British historian and publisher particularly known for her association with Kwame Nkrumah, whose editorial assistant and literary executor she was.

== Biography ==
June Milne was born in 1920 in Melbourne, Australia, and was raised in Britain after her mother's remarriage. She was educated at Cheltenham Ladies' College, before going on to earn a first-class degree in Modern History at Westfield College, University of London.

In 1944, she married Evander (Van) Milne, and they had a son and a daughter.

June Milne died in Norwich, England, on 5 May 2018. Her husband Van Milne (who predeceased her on 20 December 2005, aged 85) had been a publisher who was instrumental in founding the Heinemann African Writers Series.

== Selected publications ==
- The Oak Tree Histories. A primary school course, &c. London: Hamish Hamilton, 1959 [1960]-61.
- British History, 1485–1714. London: Hamish Hamilton, 1964.
- Forward Ever: The Life of Kwame Nkrumah. Panaf, London, c.1977. ISBN 0901787426
- Kwame Nkrumah: The Conakry Years. His Life and Letters. London: Panaf, 1990. ISBN 0901787531 (2nd, 2006)
- Sékou Touré. London: Panaf, 2009. ISBN 978-0901787439
