= Martin Petrie =

English army officer and author

Martin Petrie (1823–1892) was an English army officer and writer. Petrie, his wife and his daughter Mary Petrie were involved in the foundation of Westfield College. His other daughter Irene Petrie died as a missionary in Kashmir.

== Life ==
He was born on 1 June 1823, at the Manor House, King's Langley, Hertfordshire, the second son of Commissary-General William Petrie (died 1842); his mother Margaret was daughter and coheiress of Henry Mitton of the Chase, Enfield. He was brought up in Portugal and the Cape of Good Hope, where his father's career took him. As a young man he was mainly in France, Italy, and Germany.

On 14 April 1846 Petrie entered the army as an ensign in the Royal Newfoundland Corps, and served for 11 years in North America, becoming a lieutenant on 7 January 1848 and captain on 5 May 1854. On 26 January 1855 he was transferred to the 14th Foot regiment, and left Newfoundland on 20 March in the SS Vesta, which carried 24 passengers, seven of them, including Petrie, being officers on their way to join regiments in the Crimean War. When 300 miles off St. John's the vessel, already damaged by ice-floes, was caught in a storm, and the engine-room was flooded. Petrie managed to save the ship. His hands, however, were lacerated and frostbitten: he was invalided for some time, and could not proceed to the Crimea.

In May 1856 Petrie joined the Royal Staff College, and in December 1858 he passed the final examination, coming out first on the list. He was attached to the topographical department of the War Office from 10 March 1859 to 30 June 1864; then for 18 years (1864–1882) he was examiner in military administration at the Staff College, and latterly at the Royal Military College, Sandhurst also. He became major on 13 July 1867, and exchanged to the 97th Foot later that year; in July 1872 he retired on half-pay, in 1876 became colonel, and in 1882 withdrew from the service.

Petrie read papers on military matters at the Royal United Service Institution, of which he was a member; and as a freemason he was master of the St. John's, Newfoundland, lodge, and a member of the Quatuor Coronati lodge in London. He was active in philanthropic and religious work, and was a trustee of the Princess Mary Village Homes. Petrie and his family were involved in the foundation of Westfield College. The Petrie family introduced Ann Dudin Brown to the steering group and she funded the colleges creation.

His daughter Irene Petrie decided she wanted to be a missionary. Her father forbade it. Petrie died on 19 November 1892, at his house Hanover Lodge, Kensington Park, London, and was buried at Kensal Green. Irene set out the following year for Kashmir. Irene Petrie died as a missionary in 1897.

== Works ==
In 1860, during his first year at the War Office, Petrie brought out a standard work in three volumes, The Strength, Composition, and Organisation of the Armies of Europe, giving the annual revenue and military expenditure of each country, with its total forces in peace and war. In 1863 he published a volume giving more detailed information on the British army, The Organisation, Composition, and Strength of the Army of Great Britain, which reached a fifth edition in 1867. Petrie also compiled two technical volumes, Equipment of Infantry and Hospital Equipment (1865–6), forming part of a series on army equipment.

== Family ==
Petrie married Eleanora Grant, youngest daughter of William Macdowall of Woolmet House, Midlothian, and granddaughter of Sir William Dunbar, 3rd Baronet of Durn; she died on 31 January 1886. They had two daughters: Mary Louisa Georgina Petrie, the elder, wrote Clews to Holy Writ (1892) and other books, and married Professor Charles Ashley Carus-Wilson of McGill University; and Irene Eleonora Verita Petrie was a missionary for the Church Missionary Society in Kashmir. Eleanora Carus-Wilson (1897–1977), the Canadian-British economic historian, was the daughter of the Carus-Wilsons.

== Notes ==
Attribution

This article incorporates text from a publication now in the public domain: Lee, Sidney, ed. (1896). "Petrie, Martin". Dictionary of National Biography. Vol. 45. London: Smith, Elder & Co.
