= William Jervis Jones =

English linguistic historian (1941–2018)

William Jervis Jones (16 August 1941 – 20 April 2018) was an English linguistic historian, described as "one of the most distinguished scholars" in the field of German studies in Britain. Originally from Cornwall, he was a graduate of Oriel College, Oxford, and began teaching in the University of London in 1966, initially as an assistant lecturer in German at Westfield College; he was promoted to lecturer in 1969, and reader in 1984, before being appointed professor of German at Royal Holloway and Bedford New College in 1990. He retired in 2001. He was the subject of a Festschrift. His brother is the Australian–British librarian David Jones, author of The Australian Dictionary of Acronyms & Abbreviations (1977, etc).

== Bibliography ==
- A Lexicon of French Borrowings in the German Vocabulary (1575–1648) (Berlin and New York: W. de Gruyter, 1976)
- German Kinship Terms 750–1500 (Berlin and New York: W. de Gruyter, 1990)
- Sprachhelden und Sprachverderber: Dokumente zum Fremdwortpurismus im Deutschen (1478–1750) (Berlin and New York: W. de Gruyter, 1995)
- Images of Language: Six Essays on German Attitudes to European Languages 1500–1800 (Amsterdam and Philadelphia: Benjamins, 1999)
- German Lexicography in the European Context (1600–1700): A Descriptive Bibliography of Printed Dictionaries and Word Lists Containing German Language (Berlin and New York: W. de Gruyter, 2000)
- Historisches Lexikon Deutscher Farbbezeichnungen, 5 vols (Berlin: Akademie-Verlag, 2013)
- German Colour Terms: A Study of their Historical Evolution from Earliest Times to the Present (Amsterdam: Benjamins, 2013)
