= Agnes de Selincourt =

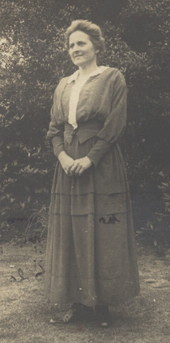
- de Selincourt in 1915
- Born: 4 September 1872; Streatham, London, England
- Died: August 31, 1917 (aged 44); Whitby, North Yorkshire, England
- Resting place: Brompton Cemetery
- Education: Notting Hill and Ealing High School; Girton College, Cambridge
- Relatives: Ernest de Sélincourt (brother)

Agnes de Selincourt (1872–1917) was a Christian missionary in India, responsible for the founding of missions, becoming the first Principal of Lady Muir Memorial College, Allahabad, India and then Principal of Westfield College, London, UK from 1913 until her death in 1917.

== Early life and education ==
She was born on 4 September 1872 in Streatham, London, the eldest sister of Ernest de Sélincourt, who became vice-principal of the University of Birmingham. Her father, Charles Alexandre De Sélincourt, was a merchant of French origin, and her mother was, Theodora Bruce, née Bendall. She was educated at Notting Hill High School and attended Girton College, Cambridge from 1891 until 1894, where she obtained a first class degree studying French and German. From 1895 to 1896, she studied Oriental languages at Somerville College, Oxford. She reputedly had a working knowledge of 14 languages. She then spent a time also teaching at Sheffield High School.

== Missionary work ==
Women's education with a Christian mission was central to her life. Whilst still at university, in 1893, de Selincourt and her friend Clara Ruth Rouse were instrumental in bringing several independent organisations in British women's colleges into affiliation with the British College Christian Union. They also detailed how to transfer the ideals of social settlement work, involving serving a community by living among its people, from their college life into missions. In 1894 they outlined a plan for a Missionary Settlement for University Women where women from English universities would set up a hostel in India and do medical, educational, and evangelistic work.

In 1896, she helped found this Missionary Settlement for University Women in Bombay, India, setting into practice the strategy of befriending the Indian women so that the teachings were heard. In 1900 she accompanied Mary Fraser on a walking tour of the Kula Valley. In 1901, she became the first Principal of Lady Muir Memorial College, Allahabad, India, and remained there until 1909.

In 1904 she wrote describing the early days of her work at Lady Muir College telling how teaching was given in Hindustani, the one common language amongst students from 'widely different races and antecedents'. She was 'intensely interested to watch the development of these girls' whose commitment to intellectual pursuits were an 'encouragement for the future' and the students' 'fellow-countrywomen'.

On her return to England she worked for the Student Christian Movement. In 1911 she was part of the executive committee chairing the second mission conference on Islam, in Lucknow, where she called on female missionaries to reach out to upper-class Muslim women, rather than taking the easy option of contact with the poorer classes, and in 1912 continued writing articles on her thoughts on missionary work, publishing an article in the newly formed International Review of Mission journal.

== Westfield College ==
In 1913, de Selincourt succeeded Constance Maynard as Principal of Westfield College, the second person to hold the lead role (and the first to use the title principal). There she continued working to support women's Christian higher education. She promoted the college with more vigour than her predecessor, and introduced public lectures, inviting the local and academic community to attend – the high point was the annual commemoration day, which included a speech from the Vice-Chancellor of the University of London, and a Guest of Honour, one of the first of whom was Dame Millicent Fawcett, a leading non-militant women's suffrage campaigner. Her time in office as the principal was overshadowed by the Great War, and the financial hardship that this ensued.

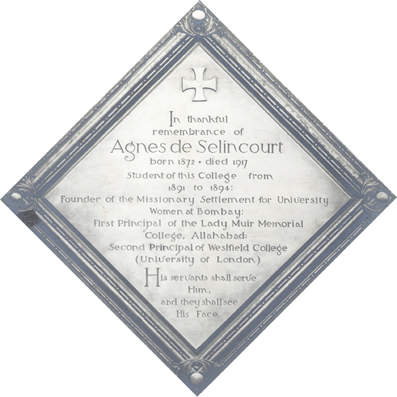
Memorial plaque to Agnes de Selincourt, located in the Chapel at Girton College, Cambridge

== Death ==
In 1917, her life, and term as Principal of Westfield, were cut short as she died from a tetanus injection following a cycling accident near the College. She died on 31 August 1917 at the Whitby Nursing Home, leaving her effects to her brother. She is buried in Brompton Cemetery.

== Memorials and legacy ==
Number 13, Kidderpore Avenue, London, originally known as Kingswear, was purchased in 1917 by Westfield College, and renamed Selincourt Hall following her death, and the Agnes de Selincourt Scholarship in Mathematics for Westfield College was named in her honour. The Agnes de Selincourt fund, a branch of the Trust Association of The Student Christian Movement of Great Britain was also named after her. A memorial plaque to Agnes de Selincourt is located in the Chapel at Girton College, Cambridge.
