= Howard Colquhoun =

British chemist

Howard M. Colquhoun
- Education: University of Cambridge. University of London. Westfield College.
- Scientific career
- Fields: Polymer Chemistry, Inorganic Chemistry, Materials Chemistry, Supramolecular chemistry
- Workplaces: University of Reading, University of Salford, University of Manchester, ICI
- Doctoral advisor: Bernard Aylett

Howard Colquhoun is Emeritus Professor of Materials Chemistry in the University of Reading.

He was born in 1951 in County Durham and was educated at Washington Grammar School and at the University of Cambridge (St Catharine's College: BA 1972; MA by seniority 1975). In 1972 he moved to the University of London as a research student in chemistry (Westfield College: PhD, 1975). At Cambridge he had been a member of the University athletics team and was awarded a half-blue for throwing the discus. He carried out postdoctoral work at the University of Warwick, and was then a researcher at the ICI Corporate Laboratory in Cheshire where he and Fraser Stoddart developed a successful collaboration. In 1994 he moved to Manchester University as a Royal Society Industry Fellow. From 1997 he was professor of inorganic chemistry at the University of Salford. In 2000 he was appointed to the chair of materials chemistry in the University of Reading where, from 2002 to 2006, he served as head of the School of Chemistry. In 2007 he was elected a visiting fellow of Clare Hall, a postgraduate college in the University of Cambridge. His research has contributed to the fields of silicon chemistry, boron chemistry, transition-metal chemistry, dinitrogen chemistry, supramolecular chemistry, polymer chemistry and fractal chemistry, resulting in two books and some 250 other publications.

He is a Fellow of the Royal Society of Chemistry (FRSC) and from 2012 to 2015 was President of their Materials Chemistry Division. Awards for his work include the RSC Medal and Prize for Materials Chemistry (2005), the degree of Doctor of Science (ScD) of the University of Cambridge (2008), the Wilsmore Fellowship of the University of Melbourne (2007), the Macro Group UK Medal for contributions to polymer science (2012), and the "Leverhulme" Senior Research Fellowship of the Royal Society (2006). He retired from Reading at the end of 2018, becoming Professor Emeritus.
