= Irene Petrie =

British missionary

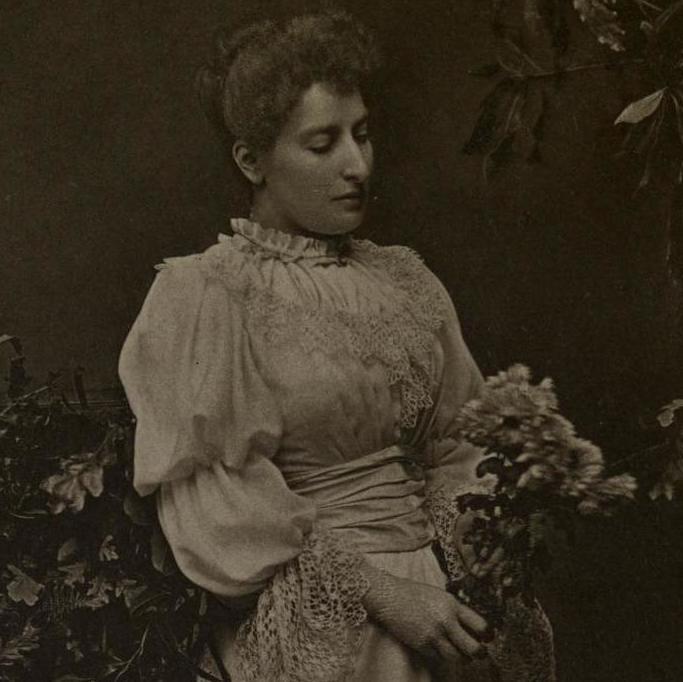
- Born: October 1864; Kensington Park
- Died: 6 August 1897 (aged 32); Leh
- Employer: Church Missionary Society
- Known for: Missionary to Kashmir

Signature
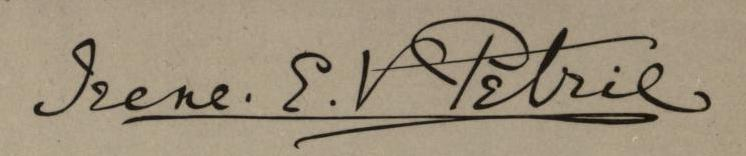

Irene Eleanora Verita Petrie (October 1864 – 6 August 1897) was a British missionary who died in Kashmir on the Indian subcontinent in 1897.

== Life ==
Petrie was born in Kensington Park in October 1864, but the exact date is not known. Her parents were Eleanor and Martin Petrie. Her father was a Colonel in the army. She was educated at home and then attended Notting Hill High School for Girls before taking the Cambridge Higher examination. She was presented at court in 1885.

She decided to be a missionary in India, but her father was concerned for her health. He died in 1892 and her sister encouraged her to fulfil her ambition. The Church Missionary Society trained her in Stoke Newington and she was bound for Lahore in October 1893. She was initially a volunteer at Saint Hilda's Diocesan Home which cared for the Christian poor. The following year, she moved to the CMS's Kashmir mission in Srinagar, where she improved her language skills. In 1895 she was sent back to England to rally support for their work. She was accepted as a full missionary and returned to Srinagar.

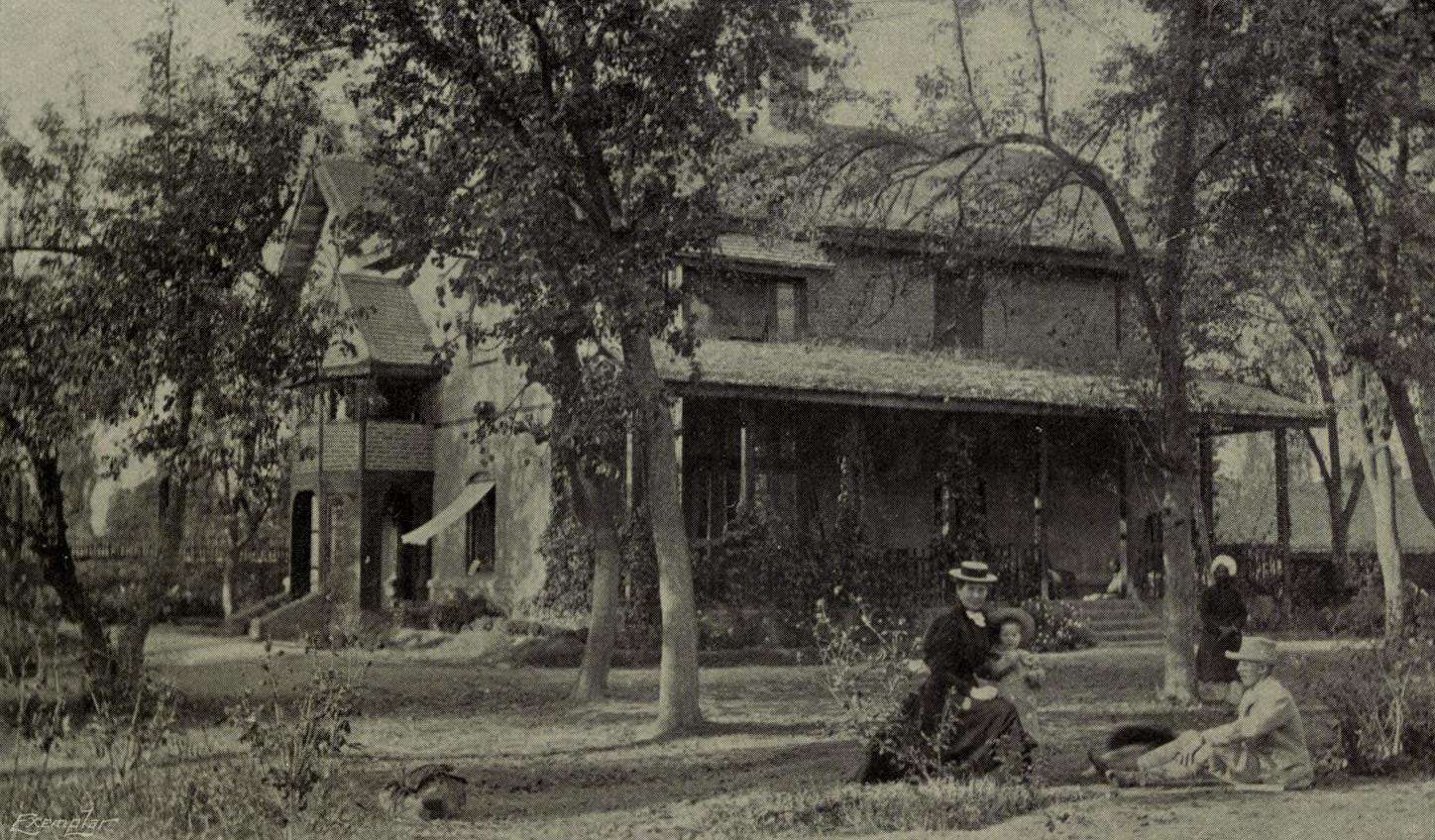
Petrie lodged at with them at Holton Cottage.

She taught children and visited Indian women in their own homes. The British had built three churches and Petrie found that she preferred the service in Urdu at one church to the one delivered in English. At the Kashmir mission she lodged with the newly married Blanche and Cecil Tyndale-Biscoe.

Petrie died in Leh in 1897 from a fever. Her sister, Mary L. G. Carus-Wilson, wrote her biography which went to several editions.
