= Ann Dudin Brown =

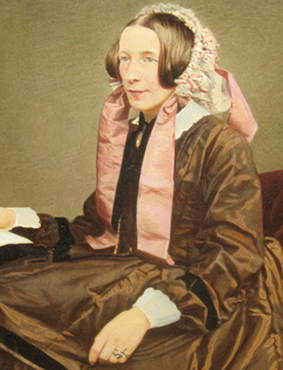
- 1845 miniature
- Born: 2 January 1822
- Died: 30 June 1917 (aged 95); South Kensington, London, England
- Resting place: Hampstead Cemetery

Ann Dudin Brown (1822–1917) was a benefactor. She funded the establishment of Westfield College for women.

== Life ==
Brown was born to John Dudin Brown and his wife, Ann, on 2 January 1822. Her father was a wharfinger on the River Thames and a generous benefactor. Brown was an Evangelical Anglican. She never married and lived in London hotels.

Brown devoted her life to Anglicanism and good works. When she was in her late fifties she heard of the American women who were being trained as missionaries in a college started by Mary Lyon. She decided to copy that initiative when she was introduced by the Petrie family to a Constance Maynard and her group who persuaded her to fund a new women's college in London instead.

Westfield college was founded in 1882 by Brown and Constance Maynard. The college which had no name had two members of staff and five students. Maynard was one of those staff and its first principal. Dudin Brown was a frequent visitor to Westfield and she continued to make substantial contributions, including funds for a permanent building, Kidderpore House, in 1890. She would fund students who had financial difficulties as well as St Luke's which was the nearest church. She was said to be pleased that the college created missionaries. The college only allowed Anglican students and residency was a requirement.

Brown died aged 95 at the Norfolk Hotel in South Kensington on 30 June 1917, where she had lived in the final years of her life.

She had said that her most pleasing work was funding Westfield College and she was buried in Hampstead Cemetery, just a short walk away on the other side of the Finchley Road.
