= Margaret Graham Brooke =

English missionary in West Africa

Margaret Graham Brooke (1863–1944) was one of the first students at Westfield College in London and a missionary in West Africa.

== Early life and education ==
Born to Henry Edward Brooke, a clergyman, Margaret Brooke was educated at home until the age of nineteen. In 1882 she became one of the first five students at the new Westfield College, a higher education college for women, affiliated to the University of London. In 1884 she passed the University of London matriculation examination, but left in 1886 without gaining her degree.

While at college, Margaret became emotionally involved with Westfield's principal, Constance Maynard. This relationship has been characterised as a college or school 'rave' - a form of infatuation for another student or teacher - common in this period, however, it was probably more serious than this, as Margaret referred to Maynard as her 'wife'. Scholars have accused Maynard of abusing her power in creating this relationship; Maynard's biographer claims that Margaret Brooke was heart-broken when the relationship ended.

== Missionary work ==
On leaving college in 1886, Margaret married her cousin, Graham Wilmot Brooke, and went with him as part of the ill-fated mission to Lokoja, Nigeria. Though this was a mission affiliated with the Church Missionary Society (CMS), the missionaries were independent of the society. It was a mission made up of young, middle-class, university-educated men, and Margaret, who were radically evangelical, and inspired by James Hudson Taylor and his work with the China Inland Mission. The Lokoja mission came under the purview of the first Black African bishop, Samuel Ajayi Crowther, and has been criticised for its insensitive treatment of Crowther's regime.

Margaret Brooke was instrumental in writing the official journal of the mission when her husband was disabled by illness and played a role in the production of the mission's newsletter that was published and circulated back in England by the CMS.

== Later life ==
Violence and illness precipitated Margaret's return to England with her son, Duncan. Graham Brooke died in Lokoja in 1892. On being widowed, Margaret Brooke returned to Westfield College where she provided some secretarial assistance to Constance Maynard. She lived in Hampshire with her son, until he died in 1897, aged seven.

Margaret Brooke died in 1944.
