= David James Dunstan =

British physicist and academic

- Occupation: Physicist

Academic background
- Education: University of Cambridge; University of Hull

David James Dunstan is a British physicist and an academic. He is the Professor of Experimental Physics at the School of Physical and Chemical Sciences, Queen Mary University of London.

Dunstan's research spans theoretical and experimental solid-state physics, including the design of experiments for optical spectroscopy and micromechanics.

Dunstan was named a fellow by the Institute of Physics in 1993.

== Education and career ==
Dunstan obtained a Ph.D. from the University of Hull in 1978. He then joined the École polytechnique in France and later Centre d'Etudes Nucléaires de Grenoble (CENG). In 1983, he joined the University of Surrey as a lecturer, later as a reader, and retained the post until 1996. Since 1996, he has been a professor of Experimental Physics at Queen Mary University of London. Between 2001 and 2009, he served as head of the Department of Physics at Queen Mary University of London.

== Research ==
In his early research, Dunstan studied the luminescence of hydrogenated amorphous silicon (a-Si:H) and its relationship to electrical transport and optical absorption. Later, his research provided a guide to the design, construction and operation of diamond-anvil high-pressure cells, focusing on the generation of high pressures up to 30 GPa. He then proposed a torsion balance technique for thin wire torsion and derived the corresponding rigid-plastic solutions. His research on the strength of materials highlighted that the Hall–Petch effect is a manifestation of the inverse relationship between the stress required and the space available for dislocation sources to operate.

Dunstan's research also identified the components that contribute to Raman spectral shifts of single-walled carbon nanotubes embedded in polymer systems and showed that the mechanical response of single-walled carbon nanotubes in tension and compression is identical. He investigated the pressure dependence of the phonon modes of different materials including wurtzite aluminum nitride. He has also published on the subjects including the homing instinct of garden snails and Bayesian methods in hypothesis selection.

== Awards and honors ==
- 1993 – Fellowship, Institute of Physics
- 2007 – Sc.D. (Higher Doctorate of Science), University of Cambridge

== Selected articles ==
- Dunstan, D.J; Spain, I.L. (1989). "Technology of diamond anvil high-pressure cells: I. Principles, design and construction". Journal of Physics E: Scientific Instruments. 22 (11): 913. Bibcode:1989JPhE...22..913D. doi:10.1088/0022-3735/22/11/004.
- Lambkin, J. D.; Dunstan, D. J.; Homewood, K. P.; Howard, L. K.; Emeny, M. T. (1990). "Thermal quenching of the photoluminescence of InGaAs/GaAs and InGaAs/AlGaAs strained-layer quantum wells". Applied Physics Letters. 57 (19): 1986–1988. Bibcode:1990ApPhL..57.1986L. doi:10.1063/1.103987. ISSN 0003-6951.
- Wood, Jonathan R.; Zhao, Qing; Frogley, Mark D.; Meurs, Erwin R.; Prins, Andrew D.; Peijs, Ton; Dunstan, David J.; Wagner, H. Daniel (2000). "Carbon nanotubes: From molecular to macroscopic sensors". Physical Review B. 62 (11): 7571–7575. Bibcode:2000PhRvB..62.7571W. doi:10.1103/PhysRevB.62.7571.
- Liu, Dabiao; He, Yuming; Dunstan, David J.; Zhang, Bo; Gan, Zhipeng; Hu, Peng; Ding, Huaming (2013). "Toward a further understanding of size effects in the torsion of thin metal wires: An experimental and theoretical assessment". International Journal of Plasticity. 41: 30–52. doi:10.1016/j.ijplas.2012.08.007. ISSN 0749-6419.
- Dunstan, D. J.; Bushby, A. J. (2014). "Grain size dependence of the strength of metals: The Hall–Petch effect does not scale as the inverse square root of grain size". International Journal of Plasticity. 53: 56–65. doi:10.1016/j.ijplas.2013.07.004. ISSN 0749-6419.
