= Mary L. G. Carus-Wilson =

British benefactor, author, speaker (1861–1935)

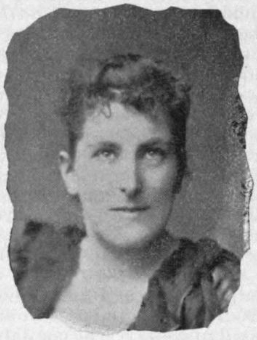
- Born: Mary Louisa Georgina Petrie; 1861; Yorktown, Surrey, England
- Died: 19 November 1935 (aged 73–74); London, England
- Education: University College, London
- Occupations: Writer, speaker
- Spouse: Charles Ashley Carus-Wilson (m. 1892)
- Children: 3, including Eleanora Carus-Wilson
- Parents: Martin Petrie (father); Eleanora Grant Macdowall Petrie (mother)
- Relatives: Irene Petrie (sister)

Mary L. G. Carus-Wilson (née Mary Louisa Georgina Petrie; after marriage, Mrs. Ashley Carus-Wilson, or Mary Carus-Wilson, or Mrs. C. (Charles) Ashley Wilson; pen names, C. Ashley Carus-Wilson and Helen Macdowall; 1861 – 19 November 1935), was an English author and speaker known for her work on biblical study and missionary work. Her father was Martin Petrie. She wrote a biography about her sister, Irene Petrie, a missionary to Kashmir. The Pitts Theology Library at Emory University has a collection of her papers. Eleanora Carus-Wilson was her daughter. She was also published using the name Helen Macdowall in the Sunday at Home and lectured on women's suffrage. In England, she established a correspondence program for the secular study of scripture.

== Early life ==
Mary Louisa Georgina Petrie was born in Yorktown, Surrey, England, the eldest daughter of Colonel Martin Petrie and his wife Eleanora Grant Macdowall Petrie. She graduated from University College, London, with a B.A. in 1881.

== Career ==
Petrie founded, edited, and was president of The College by Post, a program for secular biblical study via correspondence created in the late 19th century.

She had articles published in various Christian and women's publications. She wrote nine books about missionaries and Bible study. She was also a speaker. Her book Clews to the Holy Writ, promoted studying the Bible in its historical order. She wrote Irene Petrie: Missionary to Kashmir of her sister who died doing missionary work in India. She also wrote on the medical education of women.

== Personal life ==
She married Charles Ashley Carus-Wilson, a professor in Montreal, Canada, in 1892, and they had three children. After her marriage, she published under the name C. Ashley Carus-Wilson except in The Sunday at Home where she went by Helen Macdowall, her mother's family name. Her children were named Louis, Martin, and Eleanora. She died at Hanover Lodge in London on 19 November 1935, leaving to her two surviving children the home in Kensington that she inherited from her father. Her funeral was held at Golders Green Crematorium.

Alfred Tucker corresponded with her on 20 September 1903. She planned to write a biography about him. She bequeathed her freehold to her daughter Eleanora.

== Bibliography ==
- Clews to Holy writ; or, The chronological Scripture cycle; scheme for studying the whole Bible in its historical order during three years (1892) and London : Hodder and Stoughton (1894)
- Tokiwa and Other Poems (1895)
- Unseal the book : practical words for plain readers of Holy Scripture (1899)
- Irene Petrie, Missionary to Kashmir (1901), Hodder and Stoughton
- The expansion of Christendom: a study in religious history
- Unseal the book: practical words for plain readers of Holy Scripture
- Saint Paul: missionary to the nations: a scheme for the study of his life and writings (1905)
- Redemptor Mundi. A scheme for the missionary study of the four Gospels (1907)
- A Tabular Scheme for reading the Bible chronologically, according to "Clews to Holy Writ" by Mrs. Carus-Wilson. Moore & Edwards, Uppermill (1909)
- S. Peter and S. John, first missionaries of the Gospel: a scheme for the study of the earliest Christian age
- Ben and his mother, published by Thomas Nelson and Sons (juvenile fiction)
- Baghdad [With illustrations and a map], London, (1918)

=== Papers and articles ===
- "Serving one another" (1893)
- The medical education of women: a lecture (1895)
- Best Methods of promoting Temperance (1901), a paper she presented at the annual Women's Union conference.
- "Debt of the Home to the Book", article
