= Eleanora Carus-Wilson =

British economic historian (1897–1977)

Eleanora Carus-Wilson FBA
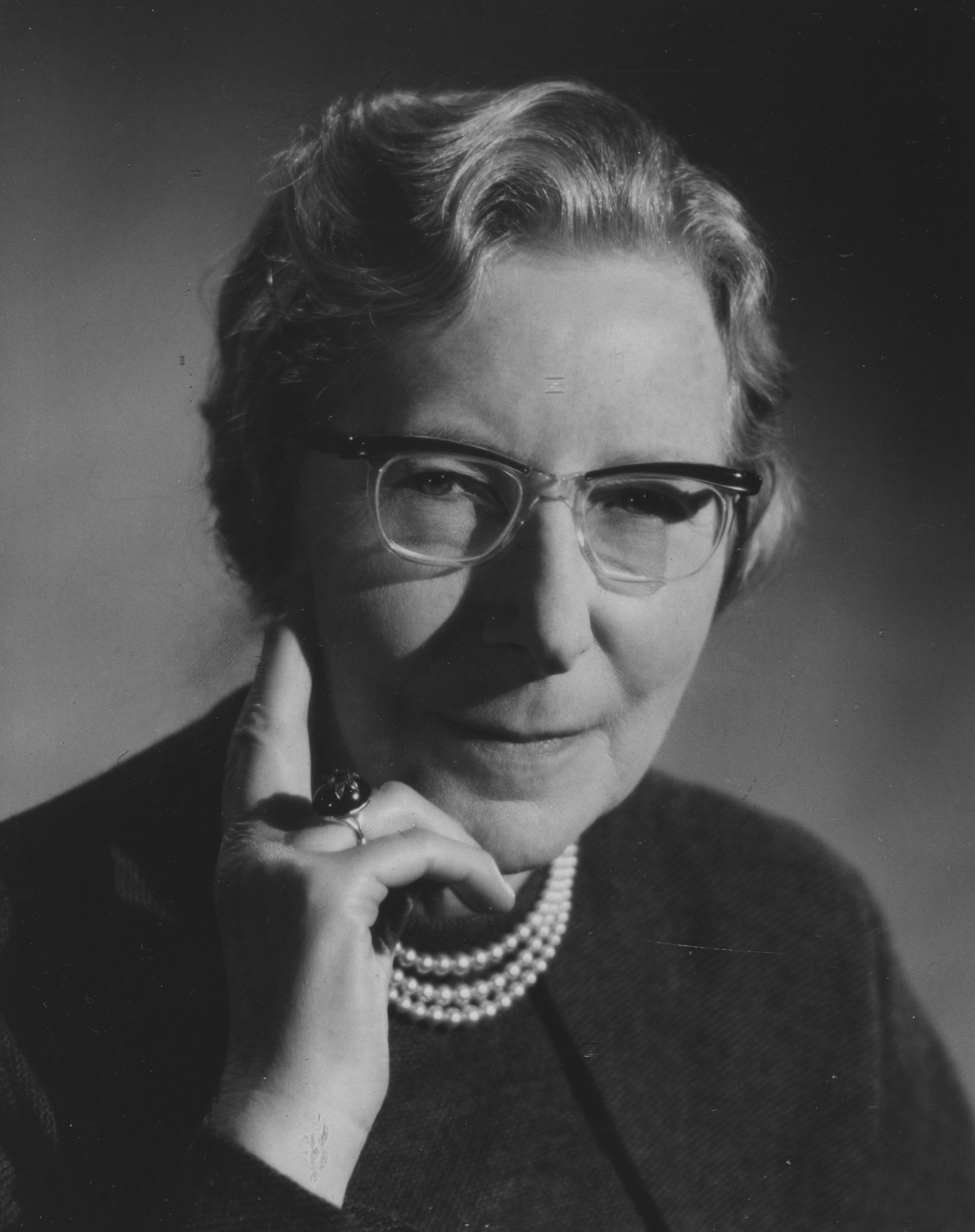
- Carus-Wilson c. 1960s
- Born: 1897; Montreal, Quebec, Canada
- Died: 1 February 1977 (aged 79–80)
- Education: Bachelor's & master's Westfield College (1921 & 1926)
- Occupations: Economic historian; teacher
- Mother: Mary Carus-Wilson

Eleanora Mary Carus-Wilson, FBA (1897 – 1 February 1977) was a Canadian-British economic historian. Known for her work on medieval English trade and rural textile industries.

== Personal life ==
Carus-Wilson was born in 1897 in Montreal, Canada. Mary Carus-Wilson was her mother. She grew up in London, England and attended St. Paul's Girls' School. She attended Westfield College and graduated in 1921 with a bachelors and 1926 with a master's degree. She died on 1 February 1977.

== Career ==
She taught part-time at a boarding school for around 10 years until in 1936 she received a Leverhulme Scholarship so she could focus on research full-time. During World War II, she worked as a civil servant in Colwyn Bay, where she worked for the Ministry of Food. After the war, she returned to London to teach at the London School of Economics (LSE). At LSE, she was mentored by economic historian, Eileen Power. In 1948, Carus-Wilson was made a Reader and then went on to become a professor of economic history. She taught at LSE from 1953 until she retired on 1965. She was a Ford's lecturer at Oxford between 1964 and 1965, where she taught English history.

Carus-Wilson also worked on creating a publishing program for the Economic History Society between the years of 1951 and 1967. She was made an Associate Member of the Royal Academy of Belgium in 1961 and a fellow of the British Academy in 1963. She also was given an honorary doctorate in 1968 from Smith College.

=== Research ===
Carus-Wilson focused on medieval economic history. During the beginning of WWII, she started publishing her research on the cloth industry in England. Her paper, An Industrial Revolution of the Thirteenth Centuryan Industrial Revolution of the Thirteenth Century, was "widely read," and discussed how medieval textile workers made significant contributions to the technology of textile work in England. Her work led to the "discovery of the importance of rural industry in late-medieval England," according to The Economic History Review.

Along with scholars, Lewis Mumford and Marc Bloch, Carus-Wilson "captured the imaginations of a younger generation of scholars in the emergent field of the history of technology with their new vision of medieval technological prowess." Carus-Wilson studied 13th century England's textile industry and described a "rapid adoption of waterpowered fulling." Her article used research drawn from primary sources such as royal and ecclesiastical records. Her research showed a type of revolution in technology that was similar to the Industrial Revolution in the amount of change it caused in 13th century England and how quickly it was adopted. In the early 1960s, she contributed 2 chapters on the wool industry to the second volume of the Cambridge Economic History of Europe (1963), which The Economic History Review called "valuable."

=== Publications ===
- Medieval Merchant Venturers (London, 1954) - collected essays, 1929 to 1950.
- England's Export Trade 1275–1547, with Olive Coleman (Oxford, 1963).

== Sources ==
- Lucas, Adam Robert (January 2005). "Industrial Milling in the Ancient and Medieval Worlds: A Survey of the Evidence for an Industrial Revolution in Medieval Europe". Technology and Culture. 46 (1): 1–30. doi:10.1353/tech.2005.0026. S2CID 109564224 – via Project MUSE.
- Youings, Joyce (1977). "Obituary: Eleanora Mary Carus-Wilson". The Economic History Review. 30 (2): iii–v. JSTOR 2595143.
