= Colin Bailey (engineer) =

English academic

Colin Bailey CBE FREng CEng FICE FIStructE

President and Principal of Queen Mary, University of London
- Incumbent
- Assumed office September 2017
- Preceded by: Simon Gaskell

Personal details
- Born: 1967 (age 58–59) Hillingdon, England, UK
- Education: University of Sheffield (BEng, MSc, PhD)

Colin F. Bailey CBE FREng CEng FICE FIStructE (born 1967) is a researcher in structural engineering, who became the President and Principal of Queen Mary University of London in September 2017. Prior to that, Bailey was Deputy President and Deputy Vice-Chancellor at the University of Manchester. He is a Fellow of the Royal Academy of Engineering, the Institution of Civil Engineers, the Institution of Structural Engineers and a member of the Institution of Fire Engineers.

== Early life and education ==
Bailey was born in Hillingdon in 1967. He left school at 16 to start work as an apprentice draughtsman at Lovell Construction. After completing his ONC, through day release and night school at Slough College, Bailey secured a job at Cameron Taylor Partners, where he become a professional draftsman and completed his HNC. After leaving Cameron Taylor Partners, Bailey worked for Clarke Nicholls Marcel, where he designed a number of buildings within London.

Aged 22, Bailey began a degree in civil and structural engineering at the University of Sheffield, graduating with a first-class BEng in 1992. He was awarded the University of Sheffield Mappin Medal and Premium for the 'greatest distinction shown by a candidate reading for the degree'. He then completed his PhD in 1995, and postdoctoral work in building fire safety.

== Senior career ==
Following his studies, Bailey became a Senior Engineer at the Steel Construction Institute (SCI), carrying out consultancy, running CPD courses and developing design guides to support the steel industry. He then joined the Building Research Establishment (BRE) as a Principal Engineer, carrying out consultancy, research and development, and design code development into all aspects of structural engineering and fire engineering.

=== Service and leadership ===
Bailey joined the University of Manchester in 2002 as professor of structural engineering, and became head of the School of Mechanical, Aerospace and Civil Engineering in 2007. In 2009, he became vice president of the University of Manchester Faculty of Science and Engineering, and in 2014 he became deputy president and deputy vice-chancellor at the University of Manchester. Among his leadership achievements at Manchester are the launch of high-profile research projects, including the BP International Centre for Advanced Materials, the National Graphene Institute (£61m of funding support) and the Sir Henry Royce Institute (£283m of funding).

Bailey was appointed president and principal of Queen Mary University of London in September 2017.

Bailey is currently a trustee and board member of Universities UK (UUK), Universities and Colleges Admissions Service (UCAS) and the University of London. He is a director and board member of Universities and Colleges Employers Association (UCEA), and a non-executive director and board member of the Russell Group and UCL Partners.

Previously, Bailey has held chair, non-executive director or trustee roles at Central Manchester University Hospitals NHS Foundation Trust (until 2017), The Sir Bobby Charlton Foundation (2011–2017), The Northern Consortium Board (2010–2017), Knowledge Centre for Materials Chemistry (2012–2017), University of Manchester I3 (UMI3) Limited (2010–2016), University of Manchester Innovation Centre Limited (2010–2016). He was a member of the UPPF Student Futures Commission (2021–2022), the Manchester Internationalisation and Marketing Advisory Board (2015–2017), and the Manchester Museum of Science and Industry (MOSI) Advisory Board (2013–2017). He was also member of the UK Standing Committee on Structural Safety (2010–2014), and the Contract Management Board (2009–2013) of the UK's National Nuclear Laboratory (NNL). He was patron of the Catalyst Science Discovery Centre (2014–2017).

Until 2015, Bailey chaired three spin-out companies: Graphene Lighting PLC, Graphene Security and BGT Materials.

For the Royal Academy of Engineering, Bailey has been a trustee (2016–2019), Chair Panel 1 and member of the Membership Committee (2013–2018) and member of the Nominations Committee (2019–2022).

Bailey was a member of the Independent Expert Panel set up to provide advice on building safety to Government following the Grenfell fire. The Expert Panel was responsible for writing urgent design guidance to address dangerous cladding and other issues on existing buildings in the UK, which was replaced by PAS 9980 in 2022.

== Research ==
Bailey is author of more than 140 research papers, conference papers and practical design guides, and has been awarded nine prizes for his research work. His main specialties are fire safety engineering structures, membrane action, wind loading and steel-concrete composite systems.

== Publications ==
Bailey is a published authority in the field of structural fire engineering and has published 10 practical fire design guides/books. This has included the publication of the "Bailey" fire design method, which has been used in design software and distributed to 2,500 companies in 20 countries.

== Recognition ==
Bailey has received numerous awards from the Institution of Structural Engineers for his research work in fire and structural engineering, including the Henry Adams award in 1997, 2000, 2001, 2008 and 2011

Bailey was elected a Fellow of the Royal Academy of Engineering in 2012.

Bailey was award the Philip Thomas Medal from the University of Edinburgh in 2014 for ‘sustained contributions to fire safety science’.

In 2018, Bailey was awarded an Honorary Professorship by Northwestern Polytechnical University (NPU) in China.

Bailey was appointed Commander of the Order of the British Empire (CBE) in the 2020 New Year Honours for services to engineering.

In 2024, Colin Bailey received an Outstanding Contribution award for his work in the field of social mobility from the UK Social Mobility Awards, an initiative created by the charity Making the Leap, which recognizes and celebrates the achievements of organizations and individuals across the UK in advancing social mobility.. Professor Bailey’s work and contributions to social mobility were further recognised by Making the Leap by his inclusion in their 2026 Social Mobility ‘Movers and Shakers’ List, appearing alongside just 13 other people including Adele, Amol Rajan, Alesha Dixon and Gary Neville.

In March 2026, due to his work in structural safety, fire engineering and higher education leadership, Colin Bailey was included in the International Fire Safety Journal’s ‘The Built List’. He was listed as a top 20 influencer in fire safety and among the top 100 influencers in the wider built environment.

== Controversies and criticism ==
=== 2020 Coronavirus Job Retention Scheme ===
Bailey was leading Queen Mary University of London during the Coronavirus pandemic in 2020 when the students' union claimed that it had refused to allow them to access the UK government's Coronavirus Job Retention Scheme (CJRS) to claim more than their actual wage bill. The University responded by indicating that the students' union was in fact prohibited by government guidelines from being able to claim more than their actual wage bill from the CJRS and that the University had committed to making sure that student workers were paid their expected wages. Students disagreed that this was an accurate representation of the guidelines.

=== Graphene shareholdings ===
Bailey is reported to have held substantial shareholdings in graphene-related companies that have led to accusations of potential conflicts of interest with his university administration roles. In 2016, The Sunday Times reported that Bailey had taken shares in Graphene Lighting, a spin-off from a company (BGT Materials) that held contracts with the National Graphene Institute during Bailey's time as deputy vice-chancellor at the University of Manchester. Bailey denied that there had ever been a conflict of interest, and as reported in Nature in 2016, Bailey had become involved in the firm’s operations as a director, shareholder, and then chair of the company with the university’s permission, and had resigned his directorships in the companies by December 2015.

In 2022, the University and College Union branch at Queen Mary University of London alleged that Bailey had not declared shareholdings in BGT Materials and Graphene Security in the university's register of interests, leading to the potential for a conflict of interest. A subsequent investigation by Queen Mary found there was no conflict of interest, with Companies House data showing that the shares have no financial value.

=== UCU strikes and "snitch forms" ===
In 2022, as part of ongoing national strikes by the University and College Union, more than 100 staff at Queen Mary University of London taking part in a national marking boycott were withheld 100% of their wages for 21 days.

Strike action continued despite a nationally agreed Acas agreement and two local agreements at Queen Mary with the University and College Union, including a 21% local pay increase in London weighting.

In the 2022/23 academic year, while strike action was continuing, the university continued to crack down and implemented a missed teaching form, which UCU termed a "student snitch form". Students were asked to report missed teaching due to strike action, so that it could be made up, with threats of docking full pay for those staff who refused to reschedule missed teaching (with teaching delivered by another member of staff). A senior UCU academic resigned from the university in response to this action, citing a lack of unbearable conditions that nullified strike action and a marking boycott . A response to the article reporting this was published in The Observer, titled "Universities' moral duty". A further response to industrial action was published in The Guardian explaining the university's moral and regulatory approach to fully protect its student's education, and that less than 1% of staff at Queen Mary took industrial action.

In 2024 the national UCU stated that 'The five-month-long marking boycott was unsuccessful because “our employers – with a few outliers – operate with total discipline.'
