= Richard Baillie =

British-American economist

Richard T. Baillie
- Born: London, UK in 1948
- Citizenship: UK and USA

Academic background
- Education: London School of Economics & Political Science
- Doctoral advisor: Kenneth F. Wallis and James Durbin

Academic work
- Discipline: Econometrics, Time Series Analysis, International Finance
- Institutions: Michigan State University

Richard T. Baillie is a British–American economist and statistician who is currently the A J Pasant Professor of Economics at the Michigan State University. He is also part time professor at King's College, London, and Senior Scientific Officer for the Rimini Center for Economic Analysis in Italy, and also on the Executive Council of the Society for Nonlinear Dynamics in Econometrics (SNDE).

== Education and career ==
Richard Baillie obtained his PhD from the London School of Economics & Political Science, where his doctoral advisors were Kenneth F. Wallis and James Durbin. He also has an MSc from the University of Kent and a BSc from Middlesex University.

He is an elected fellow of the American Statistical Association, the Journal of Econometrics and also the International Institute for Applied Econometrics. He was also given the Distinguished Faculty Award at Michigan State University.

He has held full time appointments at the University of Birmingham, Georgetown University, Queen Mary University of London and the Michigan State University. He has been Research Fellow at the Australian National University also been visiting professor at the University of California San Diego, University of Toronto, Wayne State University and Arizona State University.

== Research ==
His research is mainly on time series econometrics; and he has made both theoretical and applied contributions. He has also worked extensively on international finance and more general asset pricing issues in financial markets. He was one of the five founding editors of the Journal of Empirical Finance. He has over 19,000 citations on Google Scholar and an h statistic of 46.

== Scientific Research Contributions ==
Baillie's main area of research has been the development and application of time series analysis in econometrics. His early work was on properties of predictions from dynamic models, including regressions with autocorrelated errors and Vector Autoregressions (VARs). This work derived results for optimal predictors and evaluated the uncertainty introduced by parameter estimation. He also did related work on inference from Impulse Response Functions from various dynamic models.

Baillie has also published contributions to testing the theory of rational expectations in financial markets; most notably advocating VAR approaches over single equation methodology. He has published work on models of volatility, particularly with GARCH models, including applications to modeling risk premium, and various applications in international finance including the effectiveness of sterilized central bank intervention. Baillie has published extensively on long memory processes, and also has highly cited survey article and the long memory FIGARCH model with Tim Bollerslev and Mikkelsen, been widely used in empirical work and has also been the seed of a large theoretical literature.

== Articles ==
- Baillie, Richard (1979). "The Asymptotic Mean Squared Error of Multistep Prediction from the Regression Model with autoregressive Errors". Journal of the American Statistical Association. 74 (365): 175–184. doi:10.1080/01621459.1979.10481635.
- Baillie, Richard (1981). "Predictions from the Dynamic Simultaneous Equation Model with Vector Autoregressive Errors". Econometrica. 49 (5): 1331–1337. doi:10.2307/1912757. JSTOR 1912757.
- Baillie, Richard (1983). "Testing Rational Expectations and Efficiency in the Foreign Exchange Market with R. Lippens, and P.C. McMahon". Econometrica. 51: 553–563. doi:10.2307/1912145. JSTOR 1912145.
- Baillie, Richard (1989). "Common Stochastic Trends in a System of Exchange Rates with T. Bollerslev". Journal of Finance. 44: 167–181. doi:10.1111/j.1540-6261.1989.tb02410.x.
- Baillie, Richard (1989). "The Foreign Exchange Market: Theory and Econometric Evidence with P.C. McMahon". Cambridge University Press.
- Baillie, Richard (1991). "Bivariate GARCH Estimation of the Optimal Commodity Futures Hedge with R.J. Myers". Journal of Applied Econometrics. 6: 109–124. doi:10.1002/jae.3950060202.
- Baillie, Richard (1996). "Long Memory Processes and Fractional Integration in Econometrics". Journal of Econometrics. 73: 5–59. doi:10.1016/0304-4076(95)01732-1.
- Baillie, Richard (1996). "Fractionally Integrated Generalized Autoregressive Conditional Heteroskedasticity with T. Bollerslev and H.O. Mikkelsen". Journal of Econometrics. 74: 3–30. doi:10.1016/S0304-4076(95)01749-6.
- Baillie, Richard (2007). "Testing for Neglected Nonlinearity in Long-Memory Models with G. Kapetanios". Journal of Business and Economic Statistics. 25: 447–461. doi:10.1198/073500106000000305. hdl:10419/62906. S2CID 35725463.
- Baillie, Richard (2013). "Estimation and Inference for Impulse Response Functions from Univariate Strongly Persistent Processes with G. Kapetanios". Econometrics Journal. 16: 373–399. doi:10.1111/j.1368-423X.2012.00395.x. S2CID 116917039.
