= John Varey =

British Hispanist (1922–1999)

John Earl Varey, FBA (26 August 1922 – 28 March 1999) was a British Hispanist. He was the last Principal of Westfield College, University of London from 1984 to 1989.
