= Constance Maynard =

British educational administrator

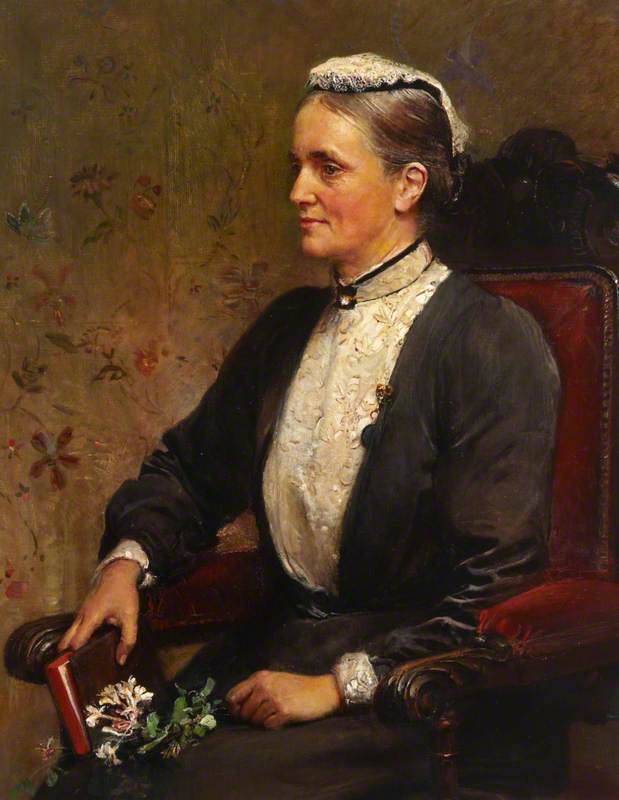
- Constance Louisa Maynard by George William Joy
- Born: 19 February 1849; Highbury
- Died: 26 March 1935 (aged 86); Gerrards Cross
- Partner: Louisa Lumsden

Constance Louisa Maynard (19 February 1849 – 26 March 1935) was the first principal of Westfield College (1882–1913) and a pioneer of women's education. She was the first woman to read Moral Sciences (philosophy) at the University of Cambridge.

== Early life and education ==
Constance Maynard was born on 9 February 1849 at 17 Park Terrace in Highbury, Middlesex to an upper-middle-class family. She was one of four daughters and two sons of Louisa (née Hillyard) (1806-1878) and Henry Maynard (1800-1888) a South African merchant. Her mother had Huguenot ancestry. She grew up in Hawkhurst, Kent, in a house named Oakfield. Her two brothers attended boarding school, while she and her sisters were educated at home by governesses, except for one year at Belstead School in Suffolk. When their education was considered complete, she and her sisters cared for her invalid mother and did charitable work. Studies of Maynard's autobiography reveal that she suppressed her carnal desires to "achieve salvation".

In 1872 at the age of 23, Constance Maynard enrolled at Hitchin College for women which was affiliated with the University of Cambridge and later became Girton College in 1873. She was the first woman to study the Moral Sciences tripos and in 1875 received the equivalent of a second class honours degree.

== Career ==
After leaving Girton (due to a temporary crisis in the family business), Maynard was permitted to accept an invitation from the Assistant Mistress of Cheltenham Ladies' College, Frances Dove, to join their staff. In 1877 she left with her colleague and partner Louisa Lumsden to establish St Leonard's School, at St Andrews, where Lumsden was head. During her three years (1877–1880) there, she rejected offers of headships, including that of her former school Belstead.

In 1880 she returned to London, living with one of her brothers to study part-time at the Slade School of Fine Art. There she became involved with a group of individuals - including Major Charles Hamilton Malan, Ann Dudin Brown and Caroline Cavendish - who shared the aim of establishing a ladies' college. Constance Maynard was an integral part of forming the plans for her ideal college - to prepare ladies for the London degree, based on Christian principles. The group first met for discussions in February 1882, and in May Constance Maynard was offered the position of Mistress (a title borrowed from Girton). The rapid progress was possible because the Petrie family had introduced Ann Dudin Brown who funded the college's foundation.

In October 1882 Westfield College opened in two private houses in Hampstead. It was one of the first higher education institutions for women in England and one of the first in which women could gain degrees.

Constance Maynard remained Mistress of Westfield for 33 years, retiring in 1913. She had taught around 500 students, and many were successful working in schools, colleges and for missionary organisations. She kept in close contact with her old students through letters and visits, and maintained strong relationships with them. The money they collected as a parting gift she donated to the college; some was used as a hardship fund, the remainder as endowment for the Maynard divinity lectures (from 1915, later the Maynard-Chapman Divinity Lectures).

== Personal life ==
Maynard was in a long-term relationship with fellow educational reformer and suffragist Louisa Lumsden. They referred to each other as wife and husband. She refused a marriage proposal from Scottish Minister Dr James Robertson.

She had a passionate relationship with a student, the future missionary Margaret Brooke, and Brooke was heartbroken when the relationship ended. Maynard's diaries show a struggle to articulate the terms with which to express the love she felt for her students, and some scholars have accused her of abusing her power in pursuing relationships with them.

In 1888 Maynard adopted a child through a friend in the Salvation Army. At the time of her adoption Stephanë Anthon, known as Effie, was eight years old, and the relationship between them was a difficult one. Whilst Maynard continued to support Effie until the latter's death from tuberculosis in 1915, it is detailed in her diaries as a period of disappointment.

Religious movements such as the Salvation Army figured prominently in Maynard's life. She was elected as old students' representative to the governing body of Girton College and served from 1897 to about 1905 on the council of the Church Schools' Society.

== Later life and death ==
After her retirement, Maynard spent her time travelling, receiving visitors, reading and writing. She wrote poetry, religious lectures and pamphlets of a moral or spiritual nature. She also edited collections of Dora Greenwell's poetry.

Maynard died at her home in Gerrards Cross, Buckinghamshire, on 26 March 1935, and was buried at Gerrards Cross parish church on 29 March.

== Legacy ==
Westfield College received £1,500 in her will to fund an entrance scholarship.

Her unpublished writings, including an unfinished autobiography, have been digitised by the Archives at Queen Mary, University of London and are available to view online.

When the papers were deposited with Westfield College Archives in 1948, they were accompanied by a letter from Catherine B. Firth which stated that "Miss Gray, the original convener of the literary executors, judged it proper (despite the strongest remonstrances!) to destroy several Green-books (and to tear out pages of the autobiography) so bereaving the value of a series of intimate records which came from 1886 to 1935, a historical crime indeed! It is, of course, obvious to anyone who reads carefully, especially to anyone who has also personal knowledge of the people concerned (or most of them) for what reasons the murder was done – rather particularly obvious in regard to the most important point.

== Publications ==
- Between College Terms, 1910
- The Religious Training of Immaturity, National Sunday School Union, 1923
- The Kingdom of Heaven is like..., RTS, 1924
- We Women. A Golden Hope, Morgan and Scott, 1924
- The Perfect Law of Liberty, RTS, 1925
- Dora Greenwell: a prophet for our own time on the battleground of our faith, 1926
- Progressive Creation, SPCK, 1927
- Then shall we Know, SPCK, 1927
- The Prophet Daniel and other essays, Morgan and Scott 1927
