= Simon Gaskell =

British chemist (born 1950)

- Born: Simon James Gaskell; 2 May 1950 (age 76)
- Education: University of Bristol (BSc; PhD)
- Scientific career
- Workplaces: Queen Mary University of London

Simon James Gaskell (born 2 May 1950) is the previous president and principal of Queen Mary University of London, and current chair of the Quality Assurance Agency for Higher Education and chair of the board of governors of the University of Plymouth. He previously served as the vice-president for research at the University of Manchester.

== Early life and career ==
He was born in 1950 and educated at Haberdashers' Aske's Boys' School and the University of Bristol, where he gained a BSc and PhD in chemistry.

Gaskell's career has spanned a number of leading academic and management posts in the UK and the United States. Following a bachelor's degree and a PhD at the University of Bristol, he took up his first research post in 1974 at the University of Glasgow. He then became head of the Mass Spectrometry Unit at the University of Wales College of Medicine, during which period he spent a sabbatical year at the National Institute of Environmental Health Sciences in North Carolina, USA. He returned to the USA in 1987 to become Professor of Experimental Medicine in the Baylor College of Medicine, Houston and Adjunct Professor of Pharmacology and Chemistry at the University of Houston from 1989.

He joined UMIST as Professor of Mass Spectrometry in 1993, before becoming Head of Chemistry in 1999 and, following the merger of the two institutions (with which he was closely involved), Associate Vice President for Research in the University of Manchester in 2004, and Vice President for Research in 2006. He joined Queen Mary University of London as Principal in October 2009.

Gaskell also served as chair of the board of the Higher Education Statistics Agency (HESA) from 2013 to 2017, and as Treasurer for Universities UK, the representative organisation for UK universities, from 1 August 2012. Since 14 March 2019, he has been chair of the board of the Quality Assurance Agency for Higher Education.

He has been a member of the board of governors of the University of Plymouth since 2019, and its chair since 2022.

== Research interests ==
A Fellow of the Royal Society of Chemistry, Simon Gaskell sits on a number of advisory boards and panels, and is also on the editorial board of a range of academic journals.

He conducted research at the Michael Barber Centre for Mass Spectrometry at the University of Manchester. His work there involved the development and application of state-of-the-art mass spectrometry, with particular applications in the biomedical sciences.

In recent years, international efforts have been made to sequence the genomes of many organisms, including man. These studies of an organism's entire DNA sequence (known as genomics) have in turn led to the development of a similar field of research, called 'proteomics'. Proteomics is the study of the structure and function of a cell's entire set of proteins, which orchestrate the chemical reactions that occur within cells. To understand how a cell works, scientists need to know which proteins are present and in what amounts. Gaskell's research uses various forms of an analytical technique called mass spectrometry to determine the quantity and longevity of these different proteins. Gaskell has recently used these techniques to study a human parasite called Trypanosoma Brucei. It causes sleeping sickness, which affects around 400,000 people each year, predominantly in the developing world.

== Controversy ==
One of Queen Mary University of London's strategic aims was to build upon the institution's global research impact as measured by, among other things, ranking in league tables.

In 2012, during a reorganisation in The School of Biological and Chemical Sciences, staff members were dismissed on grounds of redundancy while similar posts were advertised. The grounds for dismissal were based on income from research grants, on a count of the number of papers published, and on the impact factor of the journal in which the papers appeared. These criteria are widely regarded as being poor indicators of the worth of individual scientists. Articles and letters in The Times, and in Times Higher Education, and on blogs discussed the claims. Queen Mary has responded to these criticisms with a Frequently Asked Questions document and a comment piece by Simon Gaskell in Times Higher Education.

== Affiliations ==
He has been a member of the board of governors of the University of Plymouth since 2019, and its chair since 2022.

== Selected bibliography ==
=== Books ===
- Gaskell, Simon J. (1986). Mass spectrometry in biomedical research. Chichester New York: Wiley. ISBN 9780471910459.

=== Journals ===
- Gaskell, Simon J.; et al. (February 2009). "Analysis of the trypanosome flagellar proteome using a combined electron transfer/collisionally activated dissociation strategy". Journal of the American Society for Mass Spectrometry. 20 (2): 167–175. Bibcode:2009JASMS..20..167H. doi:10.1016/j.jasms.2008.08.014. PMID 18930411.

Academic offices
| Preceded by Philip Ogden (Acting Principal) | Principal of Queen Mary University of London; 2009 – 2017 | Succeeded by Incumbent |
