= Kathleen Chesney =

- Born: 26 April 1899
- Died: 12 April 1976 (aged 76)

Academic background
- Education: Lady Margaret Hall, Oxford

Academic work
- Discipline: French literature
- Sub-discipline: French poetry; medieval French literature; Guillaume Crétin
- Institutions: St Hilda's College, Oxford; Westfield College, University of London

Kathleen Chesney (26 April 1899 – 12 April 1976) was a British scholar of medieval French literature. She was vice-principal of St Hilda's College, Oxford, from 1941 to 1951, and principal of Westfield College from 1951 until she retired in 1962. Westfield College was an all-women college of the University of London, and under her leadership it expanded with the re-introduction of teaching of science at the college. Having been elected a fellow of St Hilda's College in 1924, she continued her links with the University of Oxford as an honorary fellow from 1951 until her death.

== Early life and education ==
Chesney was born on 26 April 1899 in Cheshire, England, to an Irish father who was an administrator in the Church of England and an English mother. She was a raised and remained a committed Anglican Christian, and she welcomed the increase in frequency of Holy Communion to a weekly service from the 1950s. She was educated St Hilda's School, Folkestone and The Manor House, Brondesbury. She read modern languages, specialising in French, at Lady Margaret Hall, Oxford, and graduated with a first class honours Bachelor of Arts (BA) degree in 1921: as per tradition, her BA was promoted to a Master of Arts (MA Oxon) degree in 1926.

== Academic career ==
Chesney became a tutor in modern languages at St Hilda's College, Oxford, in 1923, and elected a fellow of the college in 1924. She was additionally made a university lecturer in French in 1937. She served as vice-principal of St Hilda's College from 1941 to 1951.

In 1951, Chesney was appointed principal of Westfield College, a women's college of the University of London. She oversaw the expansion of the college: two new chairs in English and history were established, and science teaching was re-introduced. She continued her links with the University of Oxford as an honorary fellow of St Hilda's College from 1951. She retired in 1962, and that year was made an honorary fellow of her alma mater Lady Margaret Hall and the following year was made an honorary fellow of Westfield College. She served as President of the Westfield College Association from 1971 to 1974.

== Selected works ==
- Kathleen Chesney, ed. (1932). Oeuvres Poétiques de Guillaume Crétin. Paris: Firmin-Didot et Cie.
- Kathleen Chesney, ed. (1950). Fleurs de Rhétorique, from Villon to Marot. Oxford: Basil Blackwell.
- Chesney, Kathleen (1965). More Poèmes de Transition: Notes on the Rondeaux of a Taylorian Manuscript. Oxford: Basil Blackwell for the Society for the Study of Mediaeval Language and Literature.
