= Peter Alldridge =

British legal scholar

- Education: University of London, University of Wales Cardiff College
- Occupation: Legal scholar
- Notable work: Criminal Justice and Taxation (2000); Money Laundering Law (2003)

Peter Alldridge is a British legal scholar. He has been Drapers’ Professor of Law since 2003 and was head of the Department of Law (from 2008-2012) of Queen Mary University of London.

He has a Bachelor of Laws (LLB) from the University of London and a Master of Laws (LLM) from University of Wales College of Cardiff.

Alldridge was made a Fellow of the Academy of Social Sciences in 2014.

ALldridge was appointed President of The Society of Legal Scholars 2017-2018.

He has published in the areas of criminal law, evidence, legal education, law and information technology, medical law, and law and disability, including:

- Criminal Justice and Taxation (Oxford University Press, 2017) ISBN 9780198755838
- What Went Wrong with Money Laundering Law? (Palgrave, 2016) ISBN 9781137525352
- Money Laundering Law: Forfeiture, Confiscation, Civil Recovery, Criminal Laundering and Taxation of the Proceeds of Crime (Hart, 2003) ISBN 9781841132648
- Relocating Criminal Law (Ashgate 2000, republished by Routledge Revivals, 2017) ISBN 9781351812337
