= Westfield College =

Former college of the University of London, founded as a women's college

- University of London
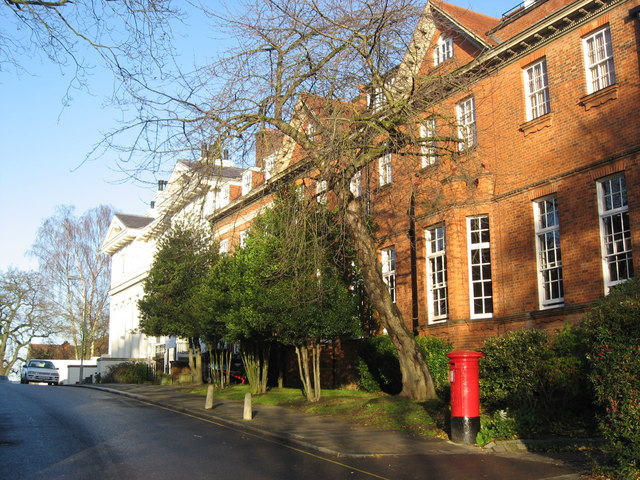
- The Old House and Maynard building, Kidderpore Avenue, Hampstead

- Coat of arms
- Founder: Constance Maynard & Ann Dudin Brown
- Established: 1882
- Closed: 1989

Westfield College was a small college situated in Hampstead, London, from 1882 to 1989. It was the first college to aim to educate women for University of London degrees from its opening. The college originally admitted only women as students and became coeducational in 1964. In 1989, it merged with Queen Mary College. The merged institution was named Queen Mary and Westfield College until 2000, when the name was publicly changed to Queen Mary University of London.

== History ==
The college was founded in 1882 by Constance Louise Maynard (1849–1935) and Ann Dudin Brown with five students in Maresfield Gardens in Hampstead. Dudin Brown had intended to found a missionary school but she had been persuaded otherwise by Maynard and Mary Petrie. They worked with the Metcalfe sisters. In 1891 the now named "Westfield College" moved to purpose-built buildings in Kidderpore Avenue, Hampstead.

Dudin Brown was the founding benefactress and council member from 1882 to 1917.

=== Twentieth century ===
1902: Westfield College admitted as a School of the University of London in the Arts.

1915: University of London recognised the Botanical Laboratory for Honours work, allowing Westfield students to sit for Honours BSc as Internal students.

1927: Chapman Wing was completed. Decision taken to name individual college buildings. The Old Wing was renamed Maynard Wing, the New Wing was renamed Dudin Brown Wing, the new building was named Chapman Wing and the New Library was renamed Skeel Library.

1928: Westfield College confirmed as a School of the university. The Head of Westfield College was included among 9 Heads of Schools of the university to be members of the Senate.

1933: Grant of the Royal Charter, Incorporating the college.

1934: Coat of arms granted 15 February.

1939-1940: Westfield College relocated to St Peter's Hall, University of Oxford after war broke out.

1941: Many of the college buildings, including Old House, requisitioned by the Admiralty for training the Women's Royal Navy Service.

1945: Westfield College returned to London.

1960: Westfield College formally acknowledged by the University of London as a School in the Faculty of Science.

1961: New Science Building completed. Westfield College began offering degrees in Botany, Zoology, Physics and Chemistry.

1969: Computer Services established, connected through a data link to the new central university computer.

1971: New Caroline Skeel Library was completed.

1971: First students admitted to study Computer Science at the new Department of Computer Science and Computer Unit.

1972: New purpose built Halls of Residence in Kidderpore Hall completed. The University of London's Murray Report published, expressing concerns about the smaller colleges, and placed in question the future of Westfield College as an independent institution.

1982: Decision made to transfer the Science Faculty to Queen Mary College.

1984: Most of the Science Faculty including Physics, Chemistry, Botany and Biochemistry and Zoology, and 68 members of staff, transferred to Queen Mary College in Mile End. Computer Science teaching was transferred to King's College.

In the mid-to-late 1980s, the University of London underwent considerable reorganisation, and many smaller colleges were merged. Consequently, Westfield was merged with Queen Mary College in 1989, forming Queen Mary and Westfield College. Most student accommodation, administrative offices and several academic departments continued to be based at the Hampstead campus until 1992, however, and the college retained its separate identity. The new, combined, college was finally located at Queen Mary's site in Mile End, East London from 1992 onwards. However, some departments moved to King's College London and many academic staff moved to other colleges, such as Royal Holloway College.

A history of the college called Castle Adamant in Hampstead was published in 1983.

=== Principals ===
- Constance Maynard, 1882–1913
- Agnes de Selincourt, 1913–1917
- Anne Wakefield Richardson, 1917–1919
- Bertha Phillpotts 1919–1921
- Eleanor Constance Lodge, 1921–1929
- Dorothy Chapman, 1929–1939
- Mary Stocks, 1939–1951
- Kathleen Chesney, 1951–1962
- Pamela Matthews, 1962–1965
- Bryan Thwaites, 1965–1984
- John E. Varey, 1984–1989

== End and legacy ==
King's College London took over the former Westfield site, which has been divided up over the years. The majority of the south side of the site (The Queen's Building and other teaching blocks) was demolished in the early 1990s to make way for The Westfield Apartments, a block of luxury private flats. The remainder of the south side (the Caroline Skeel Library, Ellison, Temple, Chesney and Stocks buildings) was used by King's College as student accommodation and as an archive. The north side of the site (Queen Mother Hall, Bay House, Old House, Maynard, Lady Chapman, Orchard I and II, Dudin-Brown and Skeel buildings) remains in use as student accommodation, with Orchard I and II renamed for Lord Cameron and Rosalind Franklin, respectively. Until 2005, the Old House was home to the London Jewish Cultural Centre.

The Westfield College name was lost following the 2013 change of the merged institution's legal name to Queen Mary University of London. The new college's student accommodation complex (opened in 2004) is named the Westfield Student Village as a reminder of the history of Westfield College. Moreover, the Westfield Trust Prize, an academic cash prize given to outstanding undergraduate or postgraduates studying at Queen Mary, has been established in memory of the college.

One of the university buildings, the non-denominational chapel built in 1929, was sold and became part of the Hampstead Manor development with its 156 homes of various types and sizes. Because it had deteriorated, the building was taken apart, re-built with modifications and renovated by the new owners. The chapel was on the market in early 2020 for £7.5 million. The Skeel Library, a Grade II listed property built in 1903–1904, also became part of the Hampstead Manor, and was also converted into a four bedroom family home.

== Gallery ==
Westfield College

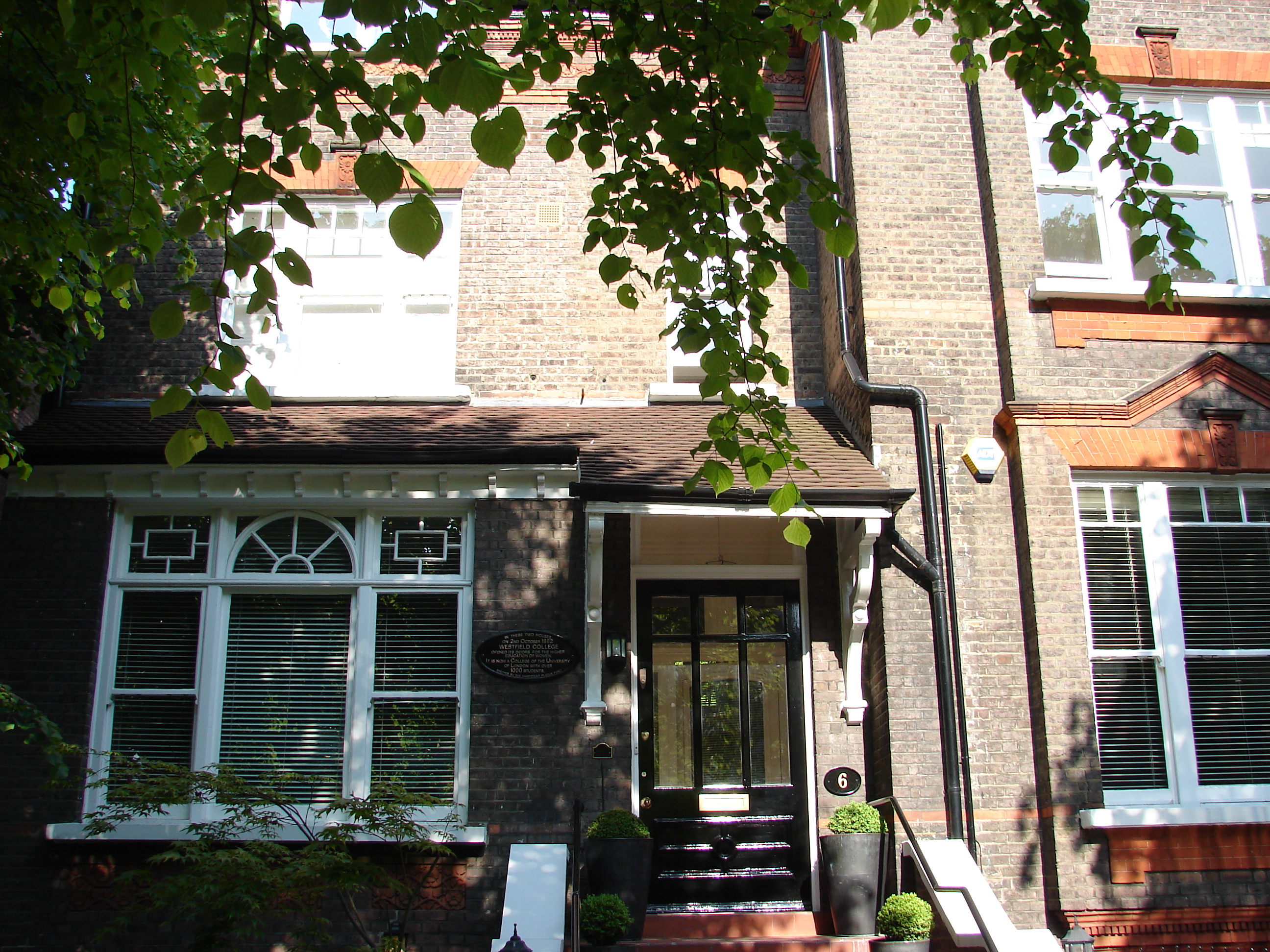
4 & 6 Maresfield Gardens, Hampstead, the original location of Westfield College

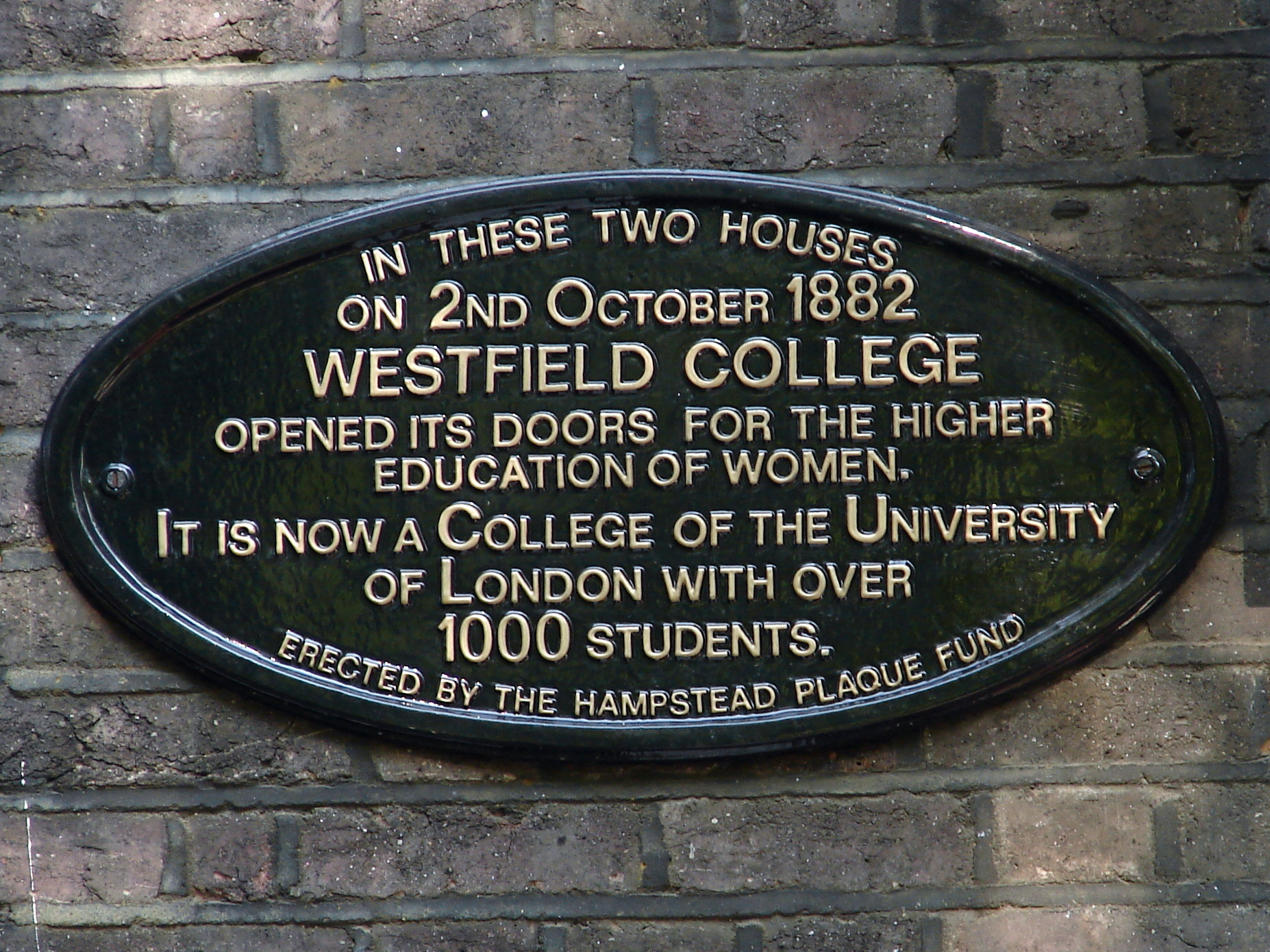
Plaque at 4 & 6 Maresfield Gardens, Hampstead

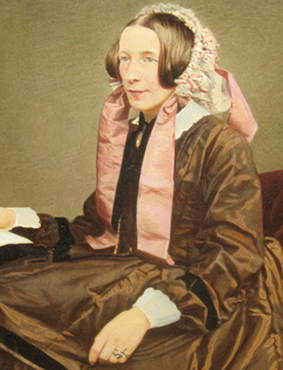
Ann Dudin Brown

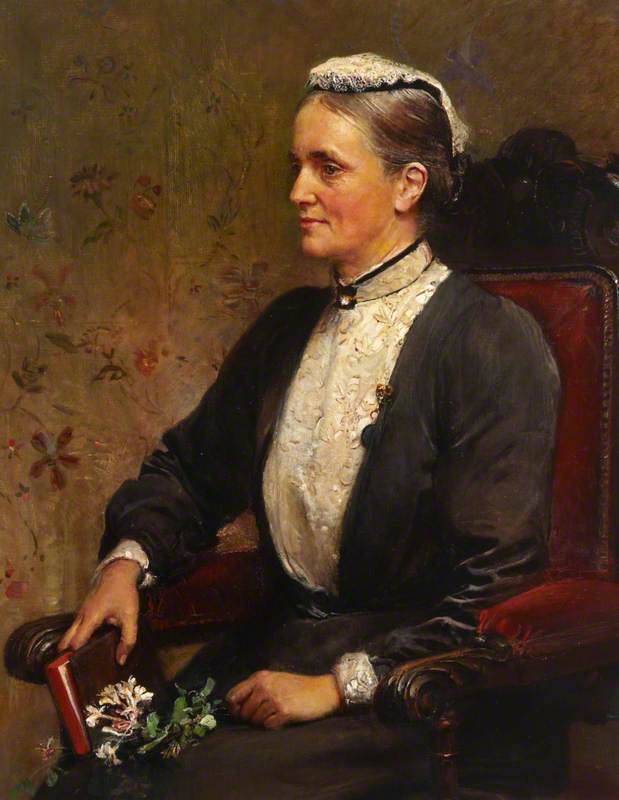
Constance Maynard

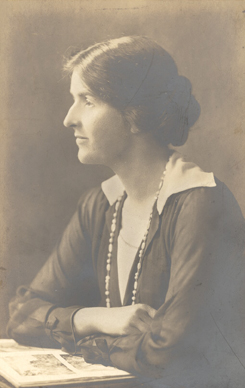
Bertha Phillpotts

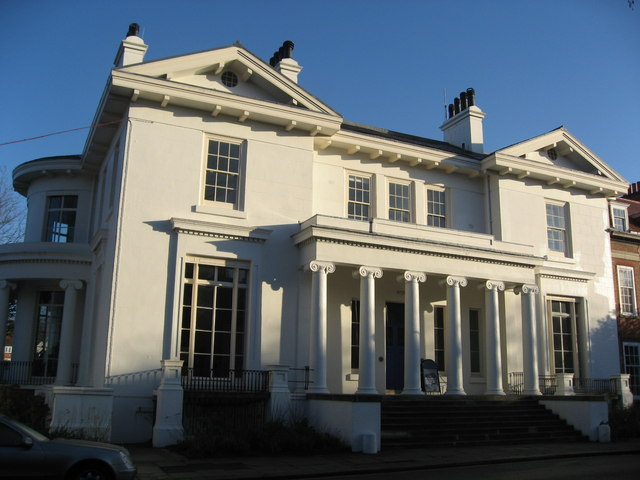
The Old House, Westfield College, Kidderpore Avenue, Hampstead

== Alumni ==
- Bill Bailey, comedian
- Joyce M. Bennett, first Englishwoman to be ordained a priest in the Anglican Communion
- Rhys Bowen (née Janet Lee, married to John Quin-Harkin), author
- Jill Braithwaite (née Gillian Mary Robinson), archaeologist, diplomat and social reformer
- Margaret Graham Brooke, missionary
- Constance Bryant, missionary
- Mary Butts, writer
- Eleanora Carus-Wilson, economic historian
- Adrian Chiles, TV presenter
- Jane Coker, Judge of the Upper Tribunal (Immigration and Asylum Chamber)
- Howard Colquhoun, chemist
- Sarah Frankcom, artistic director of the Royal Exchange Theatre, Manchester
- Frances Gardner, cardiologist
- Margaret Gilmore, BBC journalist
- Graham Hatfull, Eberly Family Professor of Biotechnology, HHMI Professor, FRS, Member of National Academy of Sciences, USA
- Jane Hawking, author, wife to Stephen Hawking
- Daphne Jenkins, author, senior examiner, teacher
- Naomi Lewis, author
- David McCandless, information designer and author
- Andrea Newman, author
- Paweł Pawlikowski, Polish film writer and director
- Sylvia Payne, psychiatrist
- Martyn Rady, historian
- Jan Royall, Labour politician
- Eric Scerri, author, historian-philosopher of chemistry
- Richard Verrall, fascist
- Guy Walters, author
- Nesta Webster (née Nesta Bevan), fascist
- Ed Whitmore, screenwriter
- Zeng Baosun, teacher

== Sources ==
- Sondheimer, Janet (1983). Castle Adamant in Hampstead. A history of Westfield College: 1882-1982. Westfield College, University of London. ISBN 0-904188-05-1.
- "Chronology of Westfield College". Library Services - Archives. Queen Mary University of London.
