= Lordship Lane, Haringey =

Street in north London

Lordship Lane
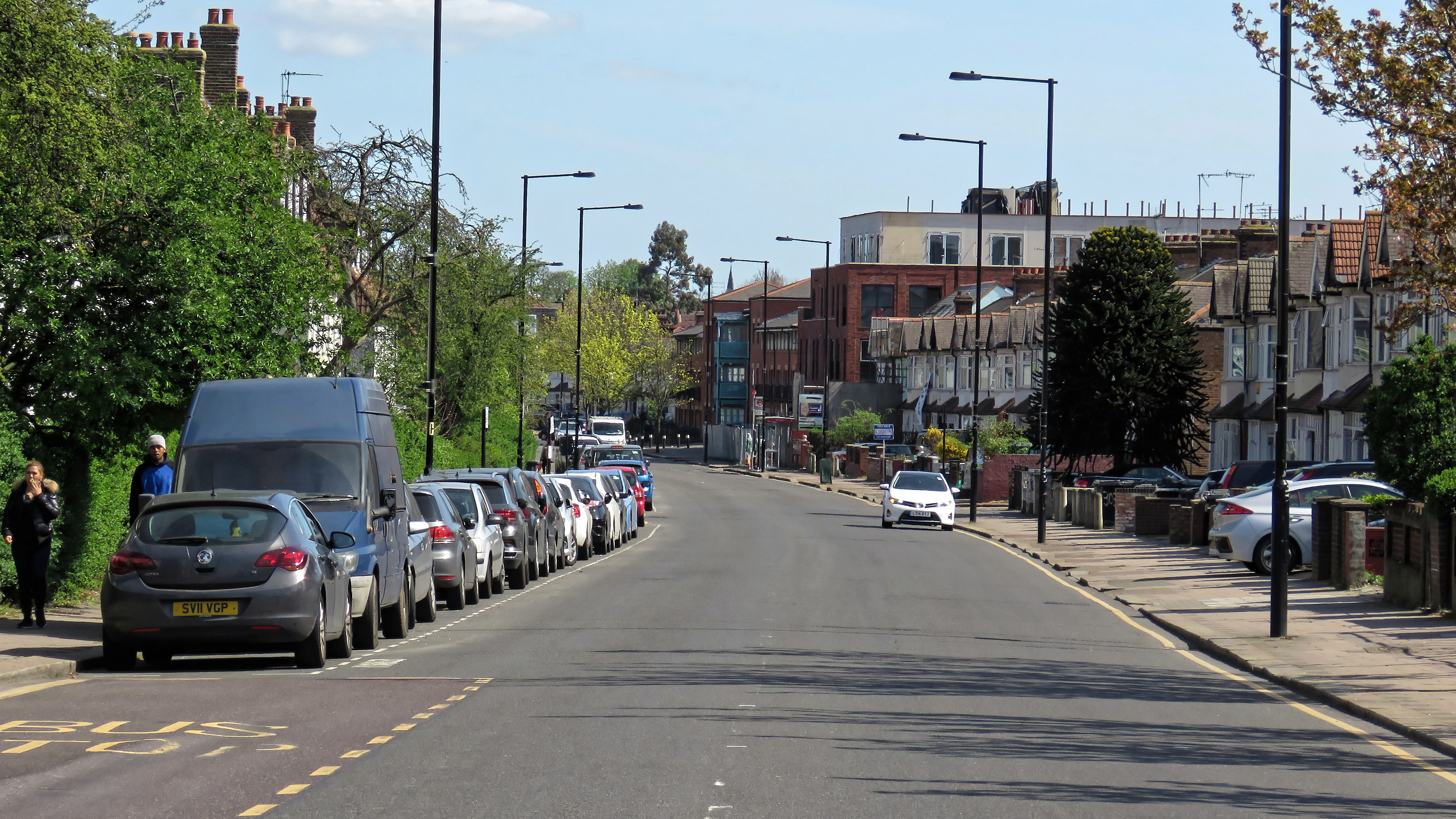
- Interactive map of Lordship Lane
- Former name: Berry Lane
- Length: 3 kilometres (1.9 mi)
- Location: Haringey, London
- Postal code: N17 & N22
- Coordinates: Wood Green 51.5971878°N 0.1097238°W; Tottenham High Road 51.5985856°N 0.0682005°W

Lordship Lane connects Wood Green (N22) with Tottenham High Road (N17). It lies in the London Borough of Haringey and forms part of the A109 road.

== History ==
Wood Green was originally a clearing in the dense forests of oak, ash and beech that covered most of what is now North London. There were a number of these clearings in the vicinity and each is likely to have been the site of a few simple habitations. Lordship Lane would have begun as a track running through the forest from the clearing at Wood Green to Ermine Street, the main Roman road from London to the north east.

During the 1000 years before the Norman Conquest, the county of Middlesex was established and divided into administrative areas called Hundreds. Lordship Lane was in Edmonton Hundred. The importance of the Hundred in local government declined as that of the Manor grew. Manors were estates controlled by a landowner called the Lord of the manor. Tottenham's manor house is on Lordship Lane. It is called Bruce Castle.

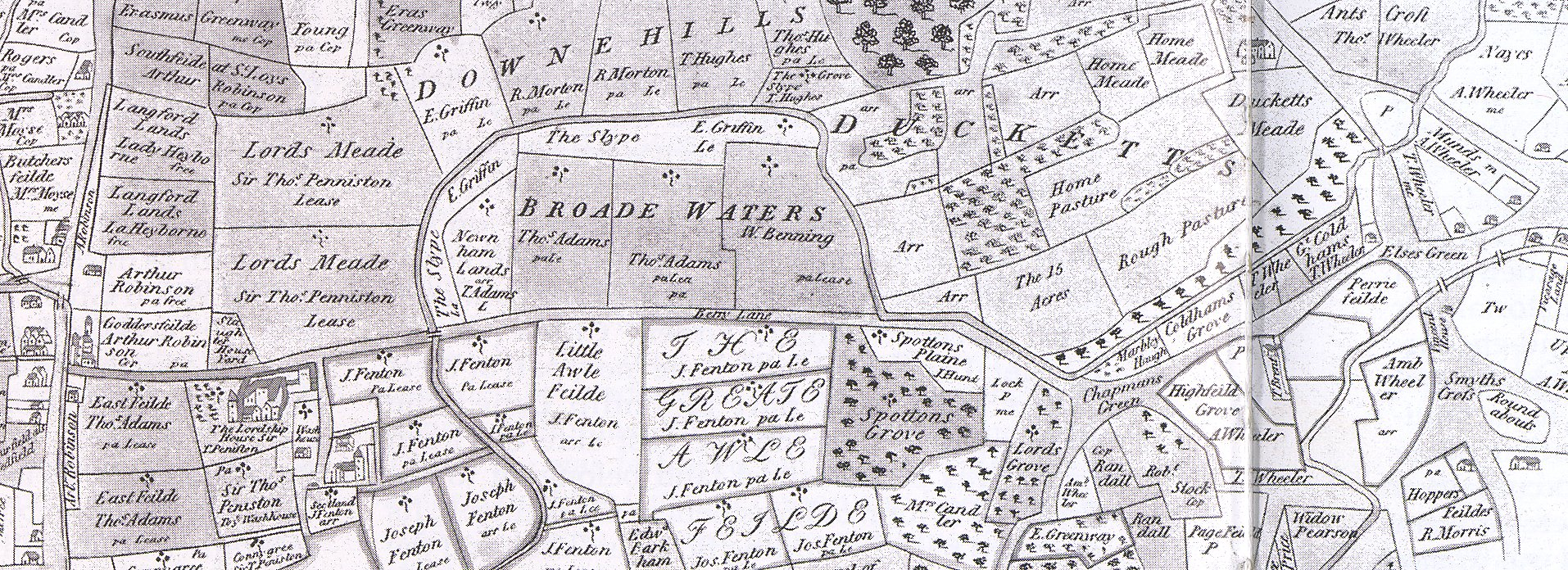
Earl of Dorset's 1619 Tottenham survey.

By 1619 (the date of the first known map) the land to the north and south of Lordship Lane had been cleared of woodland and was mostly in cultivation. On this map the majority of the lane (from Chapmans Green to Tottenham High Road) is called Berry Lane although its modern name was recorded in 1526.

In 1904 tram tracks were laid to connect Wood Green with Tottenham. These followed Lordship Lane as far as Bruce Castle. Between 1936 and 1939 the tram was replaced by trolleybuses. In 1961 these were in turn replaced by diesel buses.

== Side Streets, Buildings, Parks, Etc. ==
=== North Side, West to East ===
==== Wood Green High Road (A105) to Perth Road ====
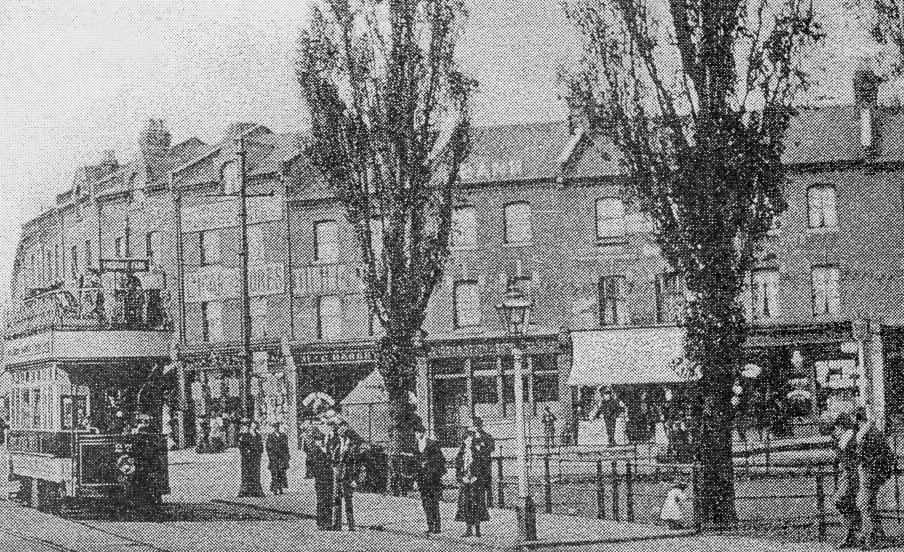
Western End of Lordship Lane looking North c1910.

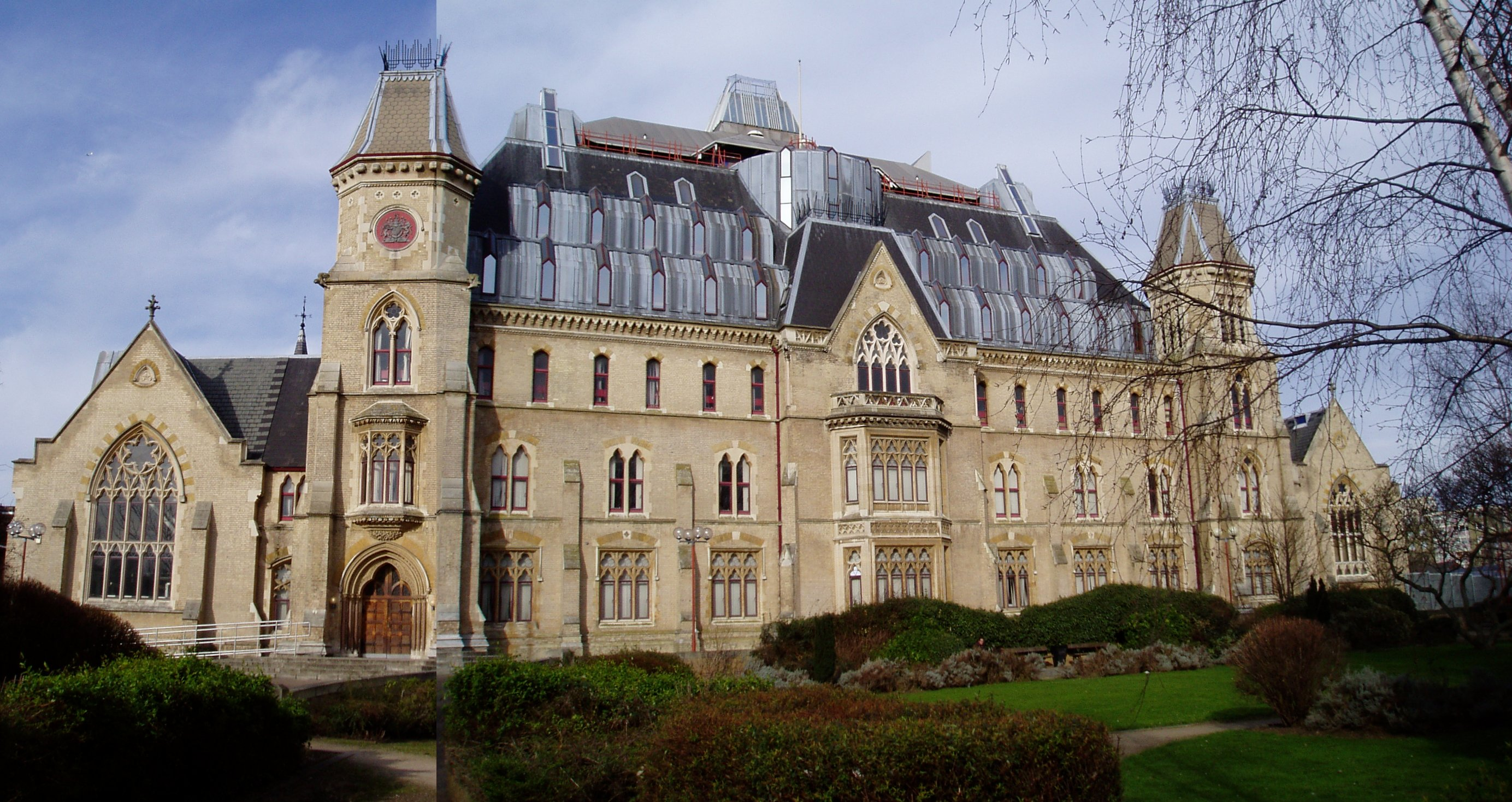
Wood Green Crown Court, Lordship Lane, London N22.

- Junction with A105 Wood Green High Road: The parade of shops shown in the old photograph turns the corner from Wood Green High Road on the left into Lordship Lane on the right. The leftmost of these (up to the bank) were demolished in 1931 to make way for Wood Green tube station. The bank remains but has a more imposing façade and is now a branch of Barclays. The trees are on what was then a small green and is now a concrete plaza called Spouters Corner.
- Wood Green Crown Court: In 1857 the Royal Masonic School for Boys, for the sons of deceased and needy Freemasons, was founded on this site in the former Lordship Lodge on an estate of 10 acres (40,000 m^{2}). Originally catering for 70 boys, the old house was replaced in 1865 by a substantial Gothic building with accommodation for 200. In 1898 the site was sold to the Home and Colonial School Society, which opened a Training College for Schoolmistresses in 1904. This ran until 1930 when the site was sold to the Tottenham District Gas Company, and the building renamed Woodall House after its chairman, Sir Colbert Woodall. It later became the offices of Eastern Gas until 1974 when the site was acquired by Haringey Council. The building was modernised and became the Wood Green Crown Court and Remand Centre with the rest of the site developed for housing. The building was struck by arson in c1989 and promptly rebuilt with a new and assertive roof.
- The Lordship Pub: Formerly the Rat & Carrot. Originally His Lordship's Tavern opened by 1875.

==== Perth Road to The Roundway (A1080) ====
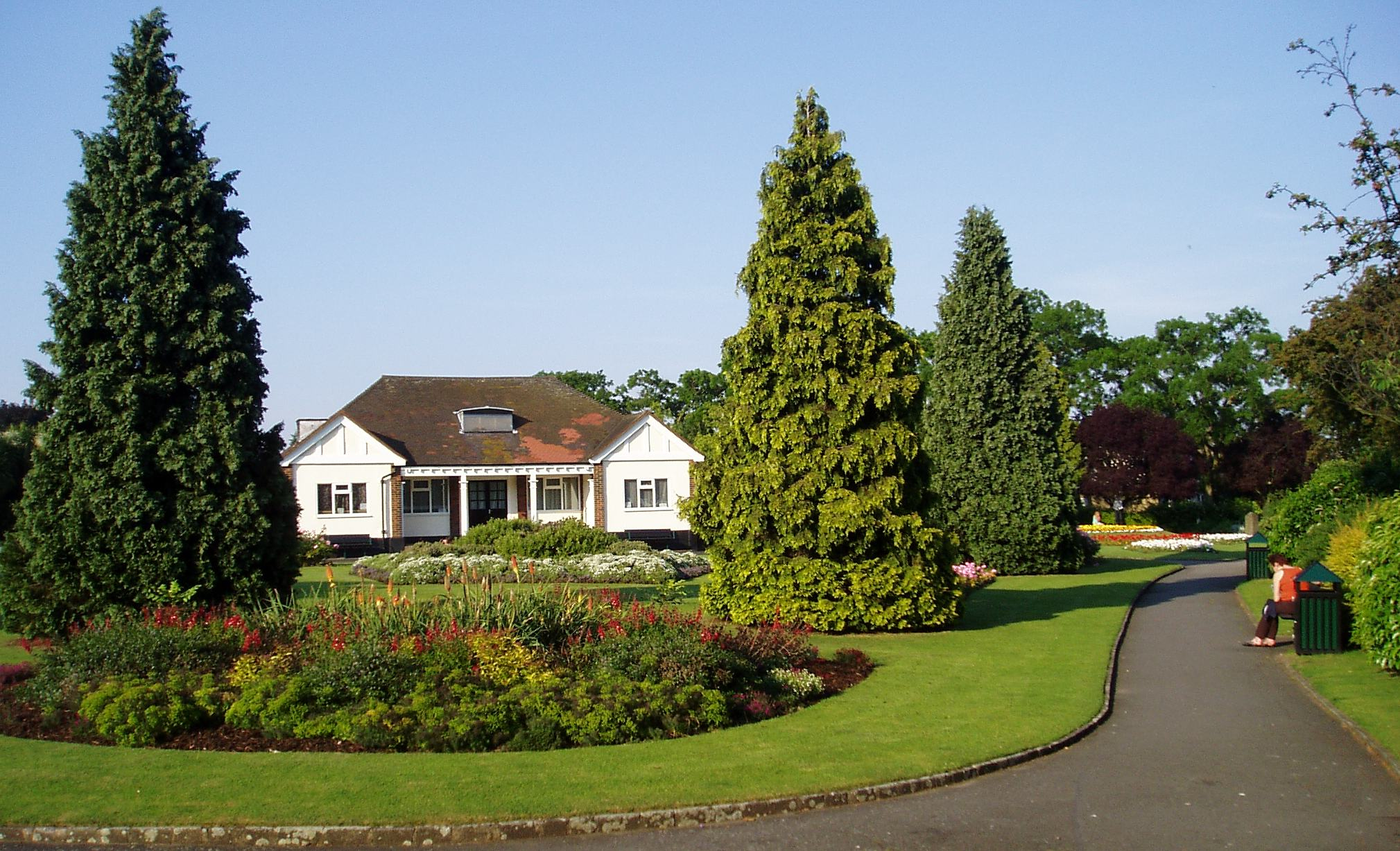
Chapmans Green.

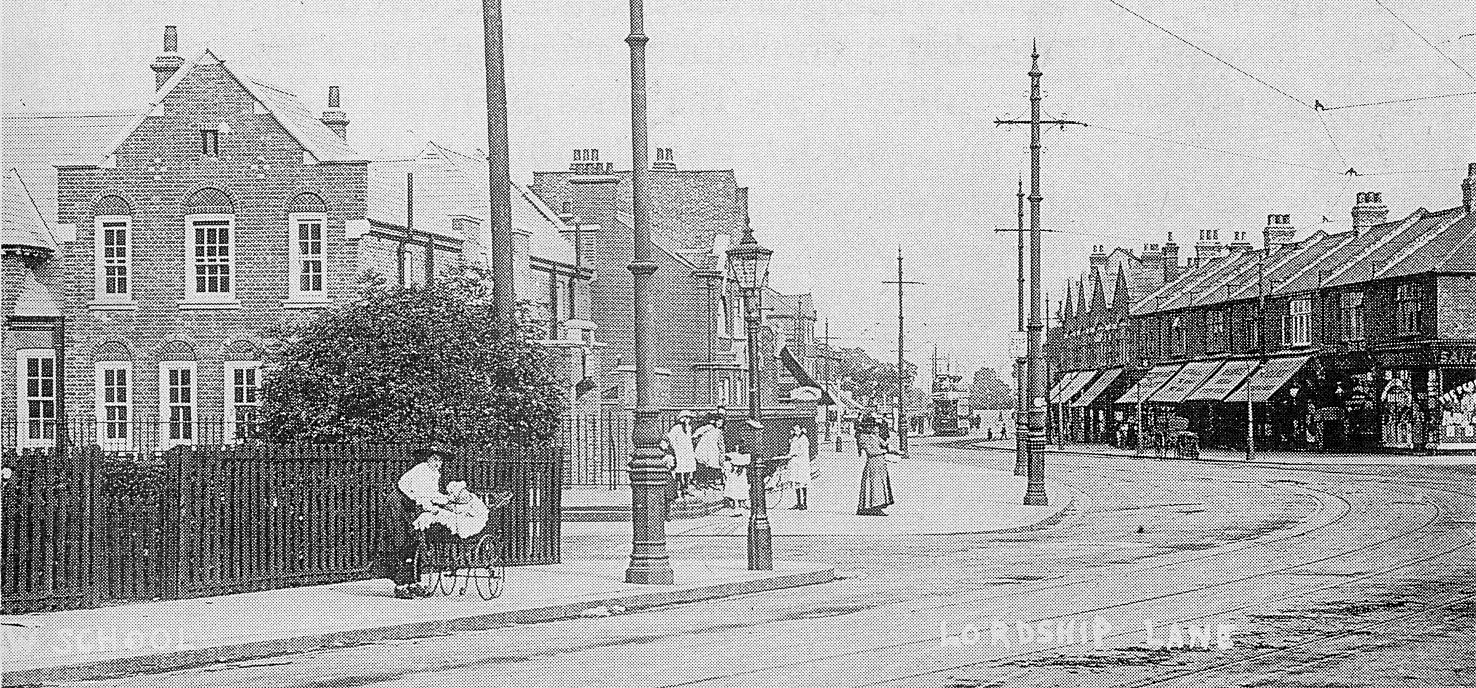
Junction of Lordship Lane and Boreham Road looking east c1908.

- Chapmans Green: A small park in traditional style with bowls and tennis. It holds a Green Flag Award.
- Two buildings, Pickering Court and an unnamed court occupy the site of a co-op grocery store that was destroyed by the only significant bomb strike to Lordship Lane during World War II.
- Two pairs of semi-detached houses: Numbers 578 to 584. The 1950s style house grafted onto the end of a Victorian terrace is a consequence of the only significant bomb strike to Lordship Lane during World War II.
- Lordship Lane Primary School: Built in 1905 on land formerly belonging to Graingers farm. Opened in 1906 when a temporary school in Gladstone Avenue (opened 1889) transferred here. In the old photograph, Ellenborough Road is on the left, Boreham Road is on the right and the Junior School is on the left. The tram is at the point where the Roundway and Downhills Way was laid out in the 1920s.
- A1080 The Roundway: A major radial road into London which here reduces from a dual carriageway to a two way road. It was laid out in the 1930s and marks the boundary between N22 and N17.

==== The Roundway (A1080) to The Roundway (A10) ====
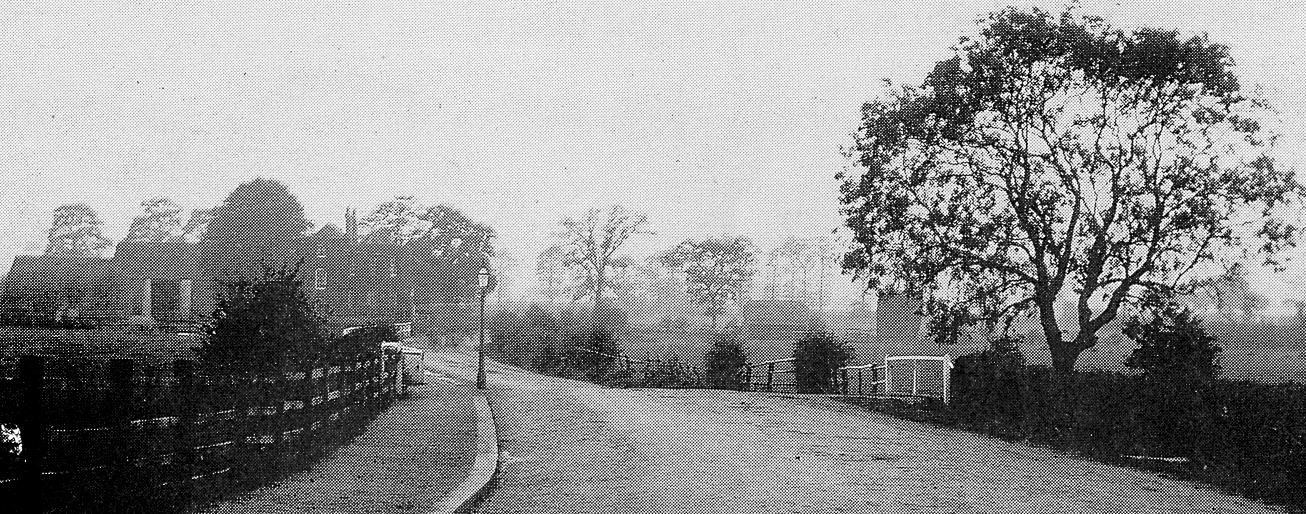
Lordship Lane at Moselle bridge looking West 1893.

- Edge of Tower Gardens estate: Numbers 388 to 458. At the beginning of the twentieth century London County Council acquired 179 acres (0.72 km^{2}) of fields to the north of the lane and by 1910 48 acres (0.19 km^{2}) had been laid out on 'garden suburb' principles. The estate is now a conservation area.
- Edge of the Peabody Tottenham estate: Numbers 80 to 86, entrance, 88 to 124, entrance, 126 to 130. One hundred and fifty four terraced cottages were built in 1907 by the Peabody Trust, a philanthropic Model Dwellings Company funded by a trust set up by George Peabody to build housing for the needy working class. In 2006 the estate buildings facing Lordship Lane were auctioned off for refurbishment by private individuals.
- A10, the Roundway.

==== The Roundway (A10) to Tottenham High Road (A1010) ====
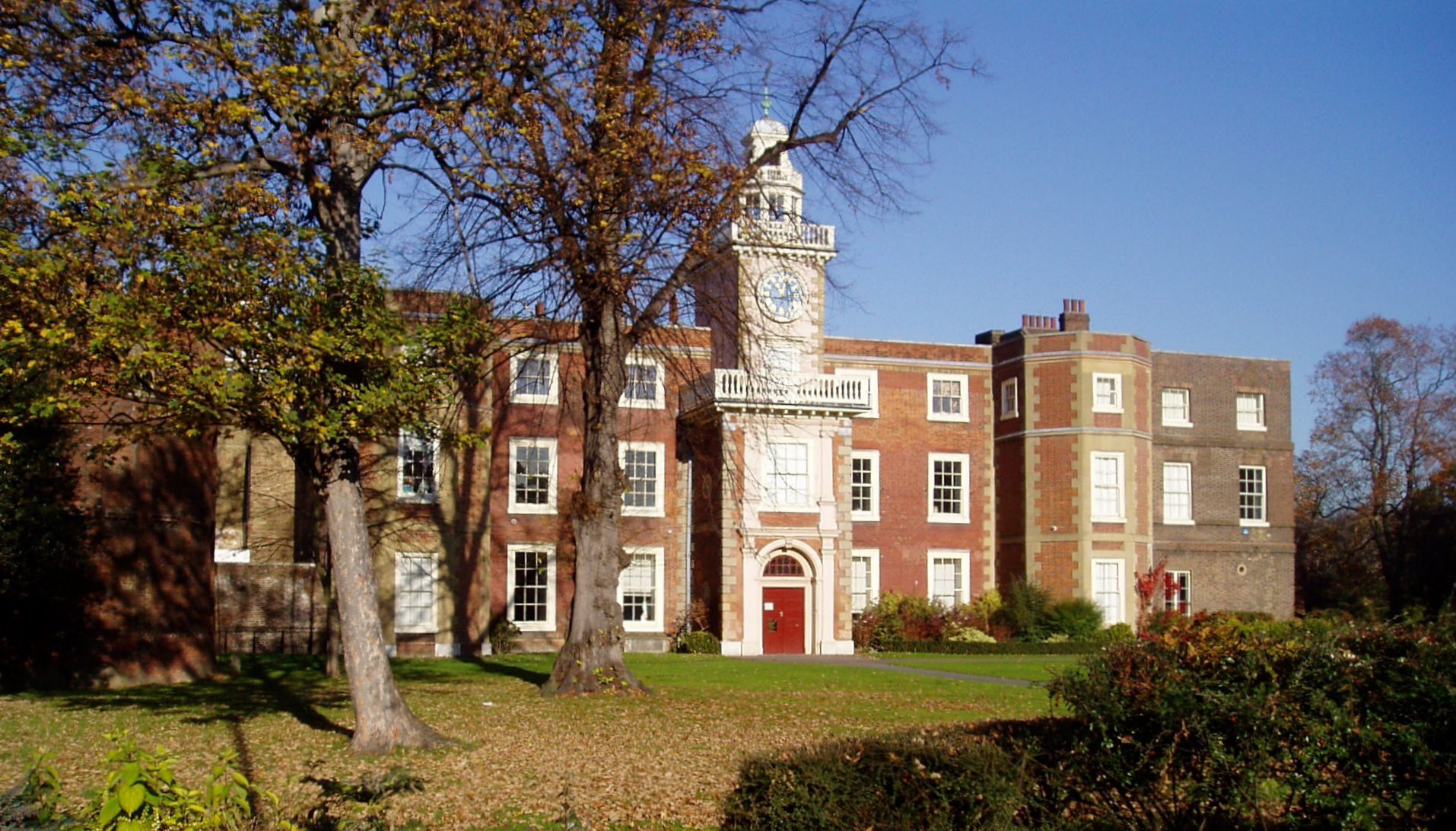
Bruce Castle.

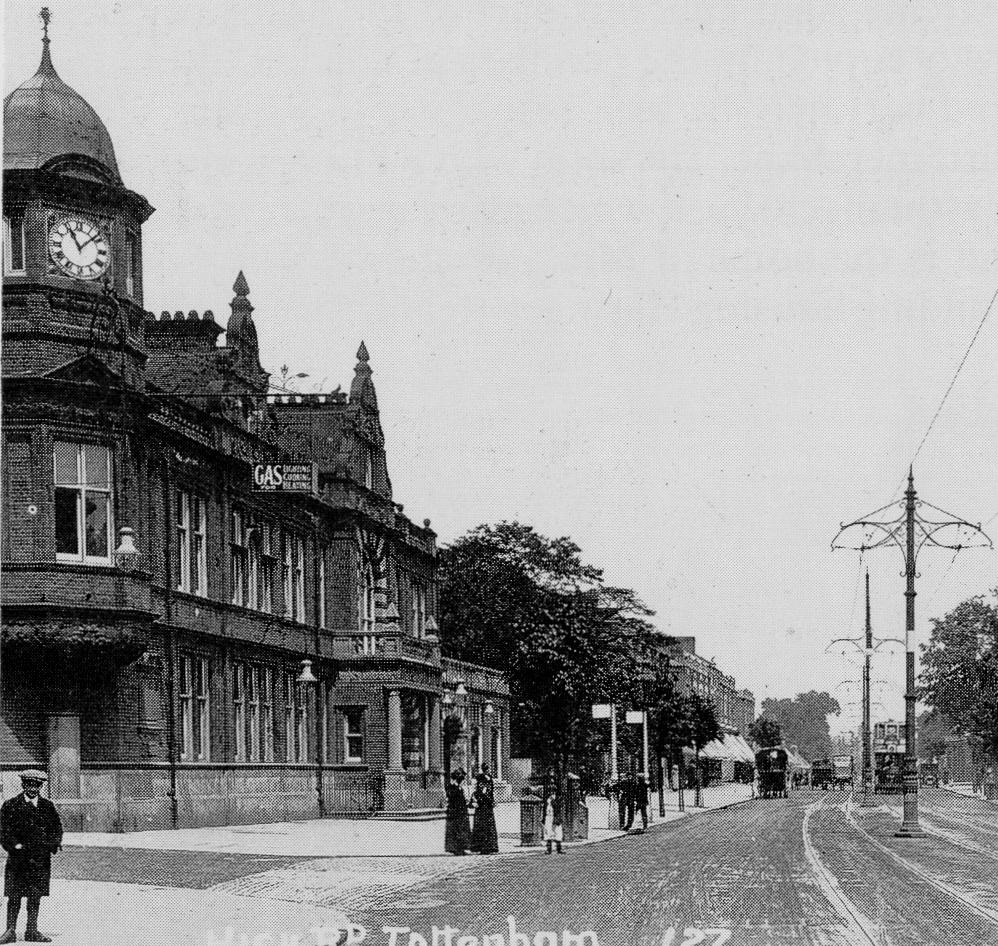
Former gas showrooms at East End of Lordship Lane.

- Church Lane: Leads to All Hallows (Tottenham's Parish Church) and Tottenham Cemetery. The church is reputed to have been bestowed to Tottenham by David I of Scotland in 1134. Its tower is 14th century, and much of the rest is original.
- Bruce Castle: At the time of the Domesday Book (1086) the Lord of the manor was Waltheof, son of Gospatric, Earl of Northumberland. Both father and son are commemorated in the names of streets in the Tower Gardens Estate, while the Earldom is commemorated in the name of an adjoining area called Northumberland Park. Bruce Castle is now the Haringey Museum of Local History including an Archive and Library. The grounds form a park with a Green Flag Award.
- Railway Bridge: Formerly carried the Great Eastern Railway line from Liverpool Street Station to Enfield, now operated by Network Rail.
- Terrace: Numbers 8 to 18. Dated 1826. "Bruce Terrace, a modest yellow-brick row, stands neglected by the railway line in Lordship Lane; it was built by an early 19th-century iron founder, Thomas Finney, and some of the houses retain iron steps which were laid at the gate-ways instead of stone slabs."
- Junction with A1010 Tottenham High Road.

=== South Side, East to West ===
==== Tottenham High Road (A1010) to Bruce Grove (A10) ====
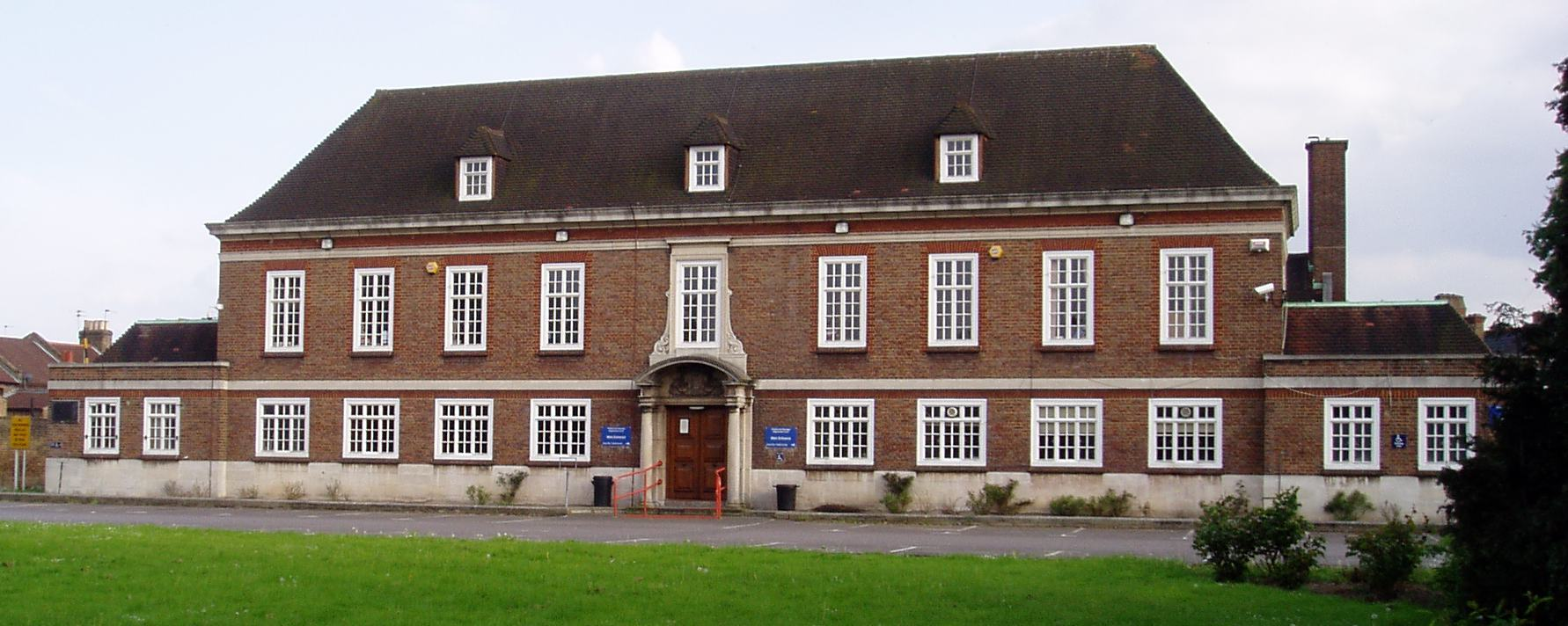
Enfield Magistrates Court, Lordship Lane, London N17.

- Millicent Fawcett Court: A small, award-winning deck access council estate, built 1969-70 comprising three blocks arranged as an elongated "u", the long axis running north–south, about four stories high. None of the flats has a Lordship Lane address. Numbers 1 to 19 were (presumably) demolished to make way for it. Named after Millicent Fawcett, suffragist and early feminist. The eastern part of the estate is built over the Moselle River, which was re-culverted during the construction of the estate. There have been buildings on this site since at least 1619 [M02].
- Enfield Magistrates Court:The Probation Service is housed in a modern building on the same site at number 71.
- Bruce Castle Court: A fifties-style apartment block with 1950s metal framed windows. In 1619 this site was called Slaughter House Yard [M02].
- A10 Bruce Grove

==== Bruce Grove (A10) to Lordship Recreation Ground ====
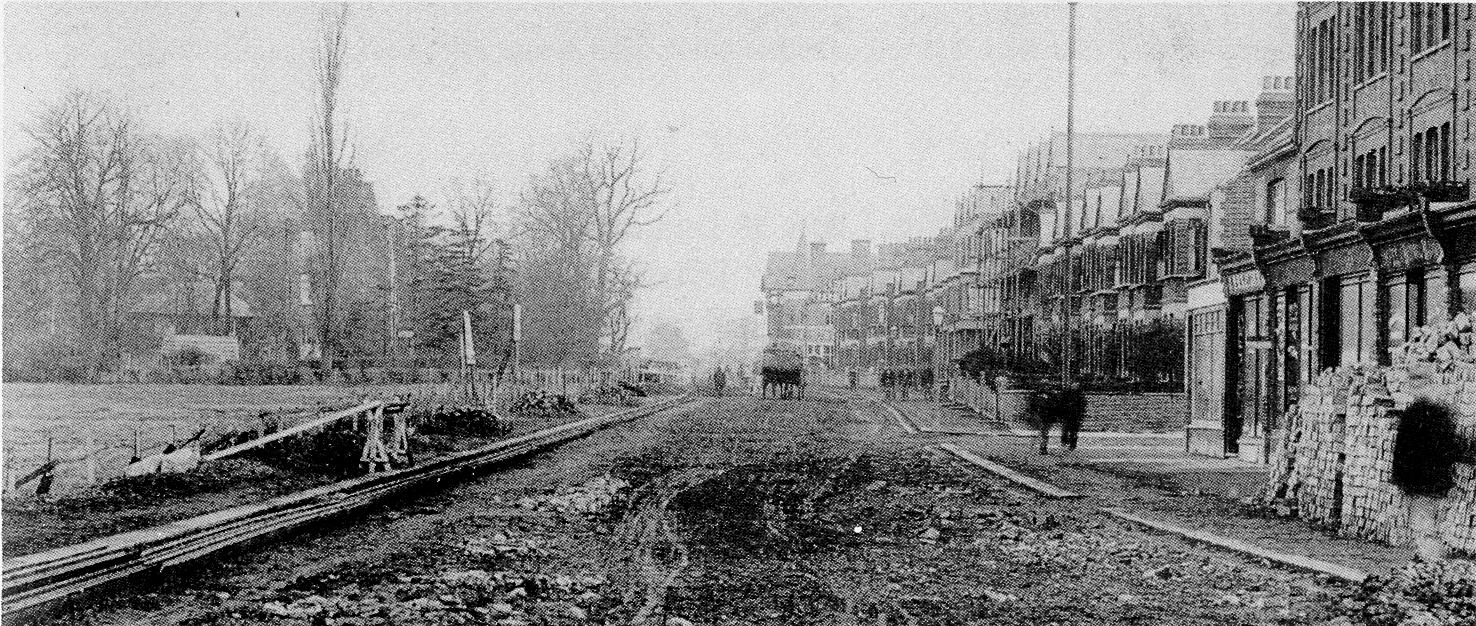
Junction of Lordship Lane and Mount Pleasant Road looking East 1903.

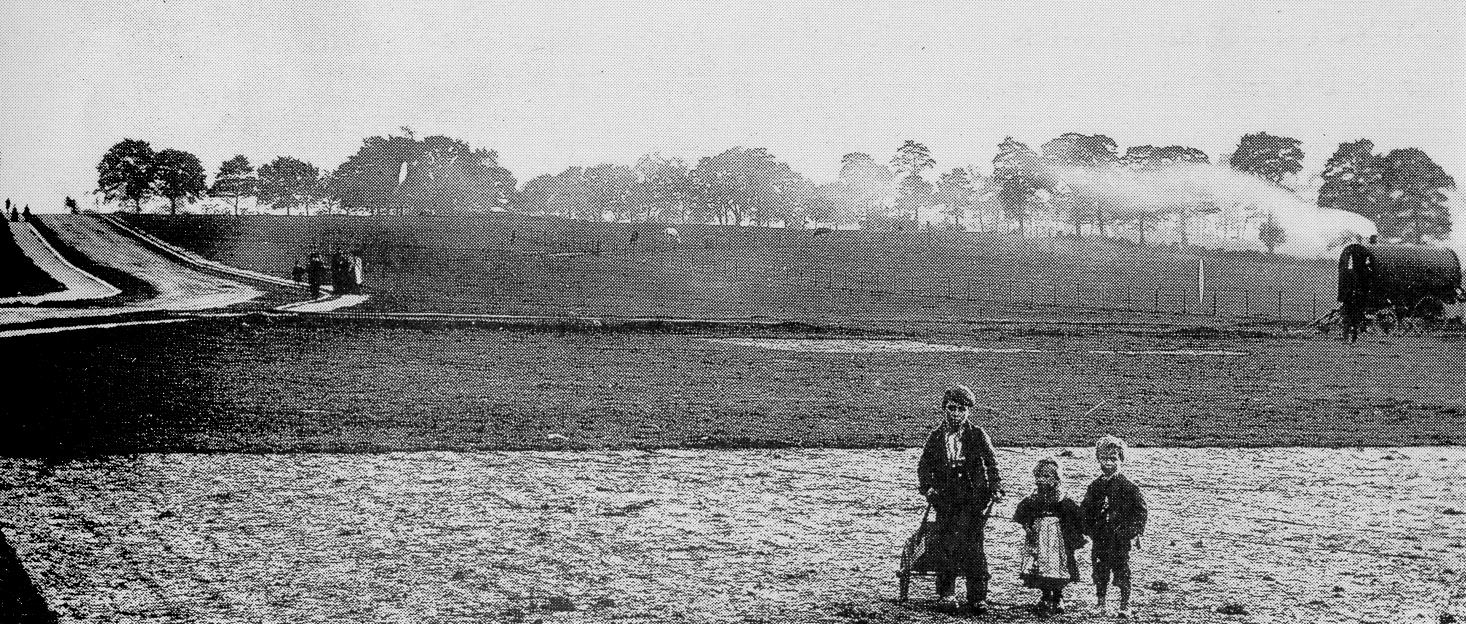
Mount Pleasant Fields looking South from Lordship Lane 1892.

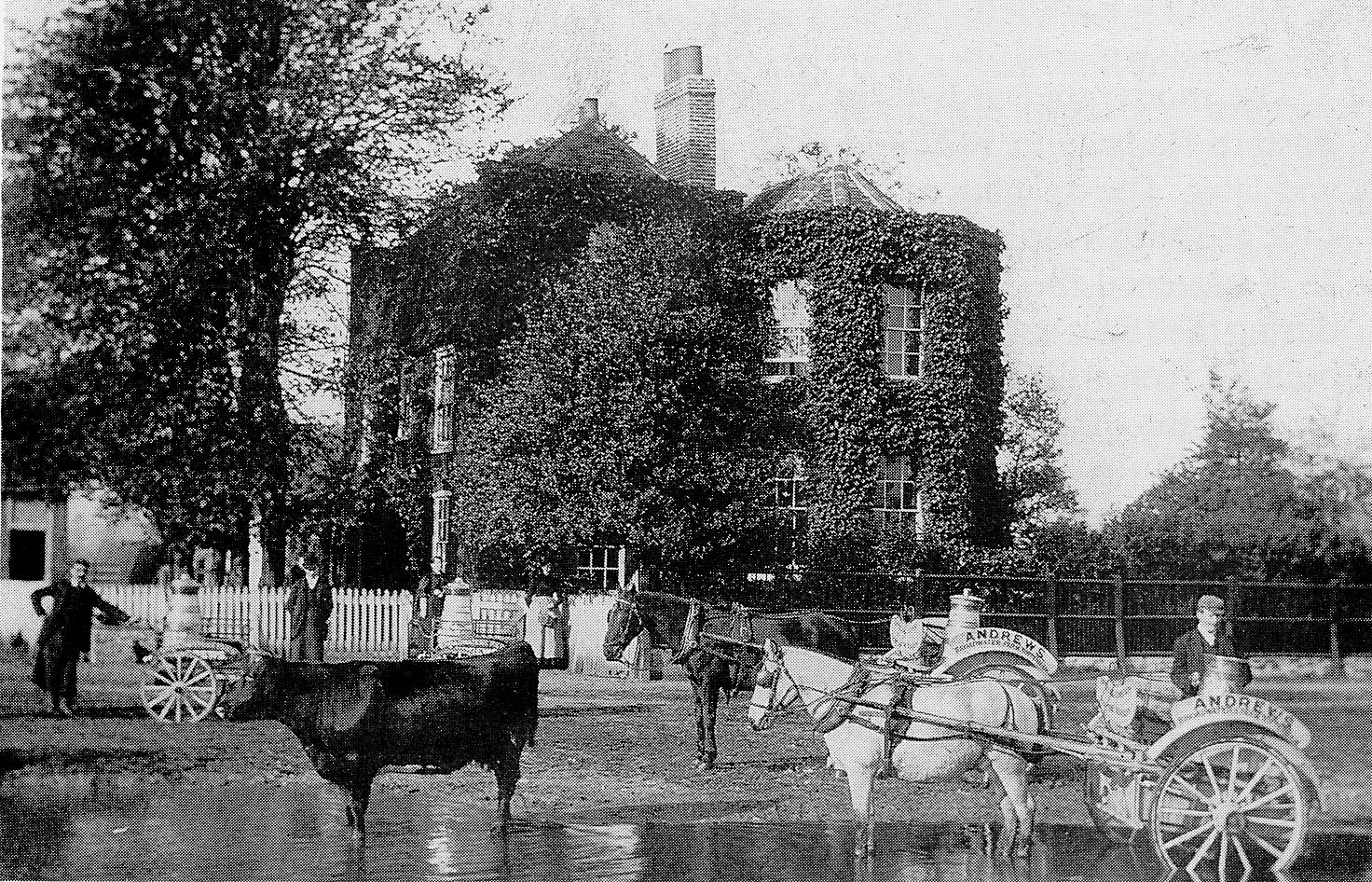
Broadwater Farm House looking South from Lordship Lane 1892.

- The Elmhurst Hotel: Built 1903.
- Mount Pleasant Road The old photograph shows preparations to lay the Metropolitan Electric Tramway Company's route from Wood Green to Bruce Grove, opened in 1904. The turning on the right is Mount Pleasant Road. In the far distance, the Elmhurst Public House is on the right and Bruce castle is on the left. The fields on the left were used in 1907 for the Peabody Estate.
- Lido Estate: Laid out on the site of the former Lordship Lane Lido. The Lido was opened on 5 June 1937 by Mayor J. H. Morrell and officially called "The Tottenham Lido". It cost £30,000. It replaced the "Old Marshes Bath" after a long process begun in 1930 and was delayed by the 1931 financial crisis and difficulty in getting Ministry of Health approval. It was a popular summer attraction for many years. Attendance fell during a run of poor summers in the late 1970s and early 80s. It was finally closed in 1985 as a cost-cutting measure by the Haringey council. See Lidos in London no longer open, Tottenham Lido. Numbers 241A/B 243A/B 245A.

==== Lordship Recreation Ground to Downhills Way (B155) ====
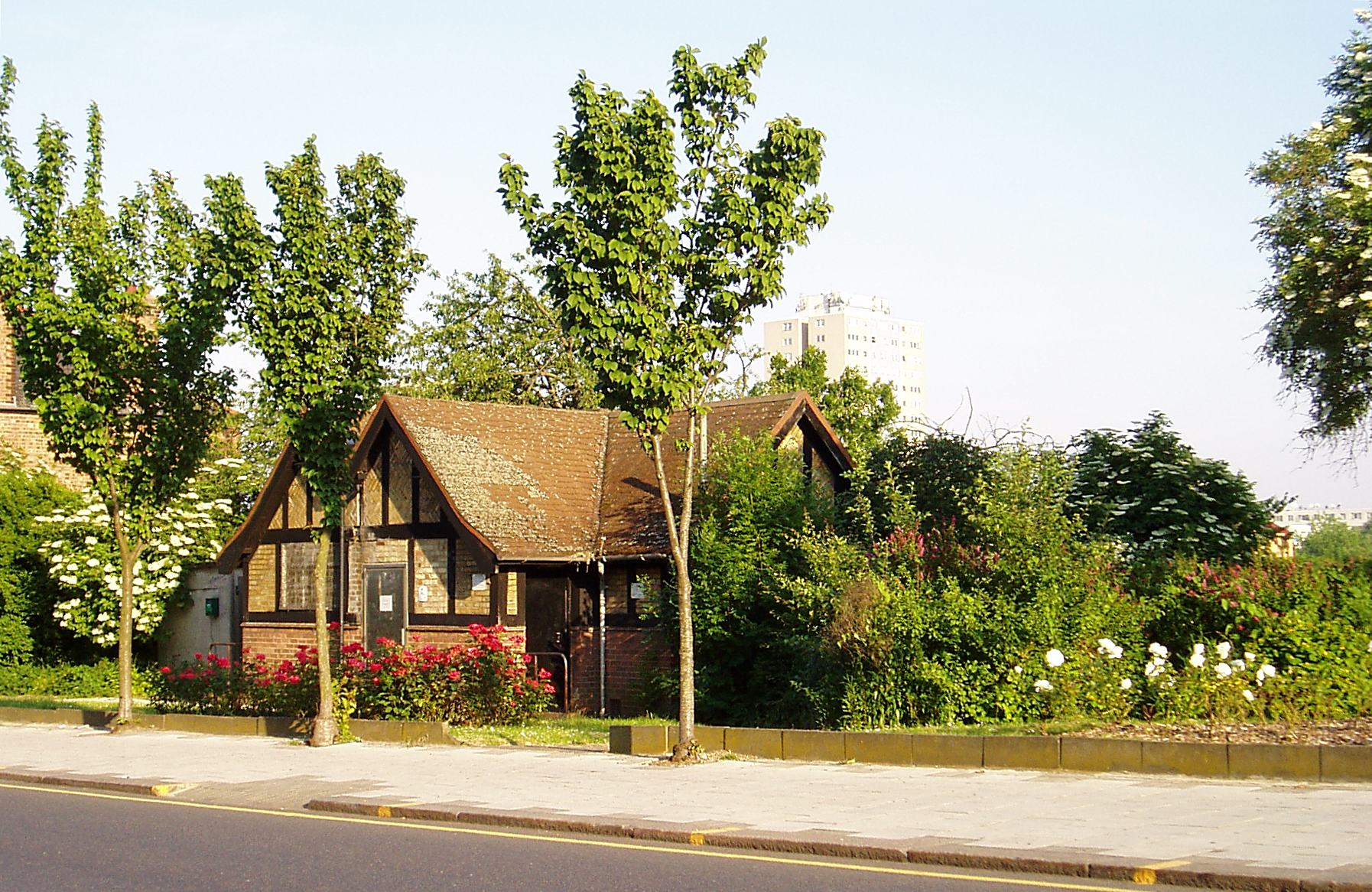
The public toilets outside the recreation ground, Lordship Lane, London N17.

- Public Toilets: This is (believed to be) a listed building.
- Lordship Recreation Ground: Opened in 1932 on about 100 acres (0.40 km^{2}) of the former Broadwater Farm acquired by Tottenham Urban District Council. In the intervening years, it has shrunk somewhat as the edges have been nibbled at for development, especially for the infamous Broadwater Farm estate built in the early 1970s. The river Moselle runs through the centre of the park.

==== Moselle Avenue to Wood Green High Road (A105) ====
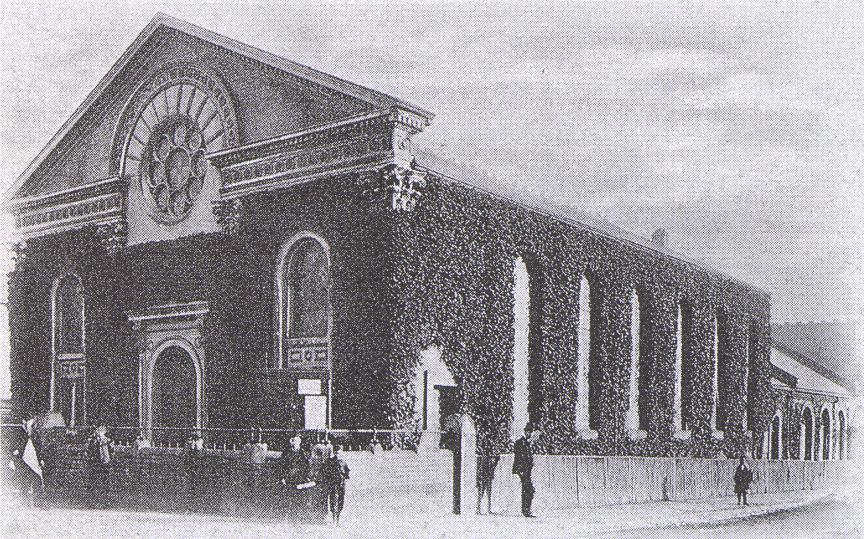
Congregational Chapel (1905).

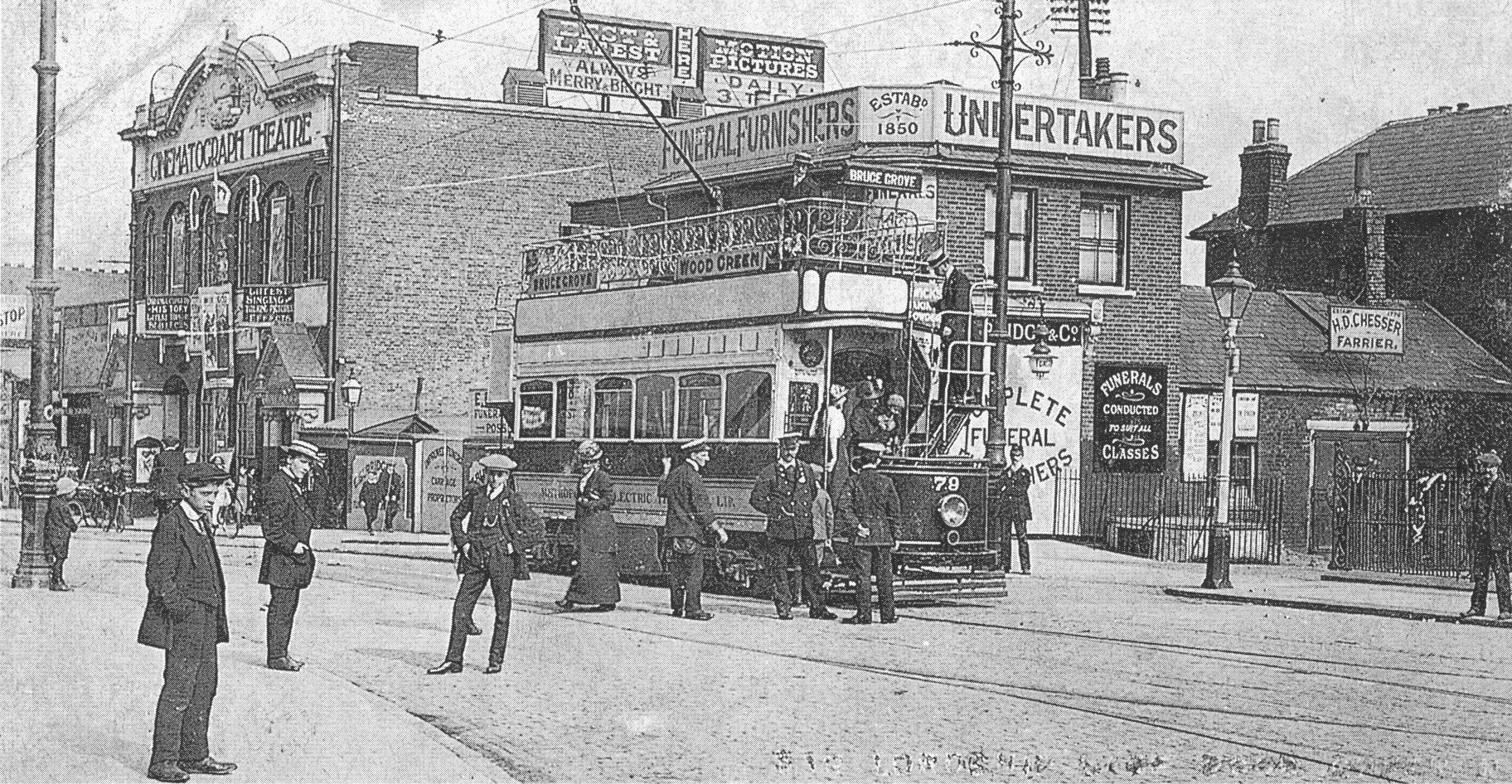
Cinematograph Theatre in 1913.

- Mecca Bingo: From the 1920s the site of the former City Bus company depot. After Nationalisation in 1947, the depot and starting point of the Eastern National routes to Southend and Westcliff. The building and forecourt were used for the non-studio scenes in the 1970s British TV series On the Buses. Services ceased in the early 1980s and the building was redeveloped as a W H Smith 'Do-it-all' centre. In the 1990s this was converted into the Bingo Hall.
- Hollywood Green Showcase Cinema: For most of the twentieth century the Lordship Lane frontage of this site accommodated the Cinematograph Theatre building and Burridge and Company, undertakers. The Cinematograph was a purpose-built cinema. It opened in 1910 and closed in the late 1920s. The building then became Garner's furniture depository and housed Harry Boult's School of Dancing on the first floor. In more recent years it became an indoor market hall. Both buildings were demolished in 1999 to make way for Hollywood Green a six-screen cinema. Also visible in the old photograph is H. D. Chesser, Farrier (or Blacksmith) which survived as a going concern from 1770 to the 1920s. There has been a building at the far west of the lane since at least 1619 [M02].
- Spouters Corner: Was first used for a political meeting in 1867 by the Reform League. By the end of the nineteenth century the common land here had become a venue for stump orators and political gatherings, thereby acquiring its name. Its significance increased during the First World War and the inter-war years. It was also an assembly point for contracting local labour before Labour Exchanges were introduced in 1910. In the post-war years, it attracted both local and national political figures and saw CND meetings in the late 1950s and 1960s. In more recent years its use has waned as political speakers have favoured the forecourt of the Central Library. But it accommodates a large fir tree each Christmas.

== Transport ==
=== Underground ===
Wood Green Underground station is at the western end of Lordship Lane. It is served by the Piccadilly line.

=== Buses ===
Bus routes 123, 144, 243, 318 and W3 serve the lane:

- 123 (Wood Green to Ilford) serves the central section of the lane between Westbury Avenue and Bruce Grove.
- 144 (Muswell Hill to Edmonton Green) serves the western end of the lane between Wood Green tube station to The Roundway (West Arm).
- 243 (Wood Green to Waterloo) runs from its terminus at Wood Green tube station to Bruce Castle where it turns off down Bruce Grove.
- 318 (North Middlesex Hospital to Stamford Hill) serves the eastern end of the lane between Tottenham High Road and The Roundway (East Arm).
- W3 (Finsbury Park to Northumberland Park) serves a short stretch of the western end of the lane between Wood Green tube station and Perth Road.

=== Other ===
A Channel 4 News report revealed that in 2004/5, Haringey Council collected £3.2m in fines for traffic offences occurring in the street, a figure greater than any other street in the country.

== Maps (in chronological order) ==
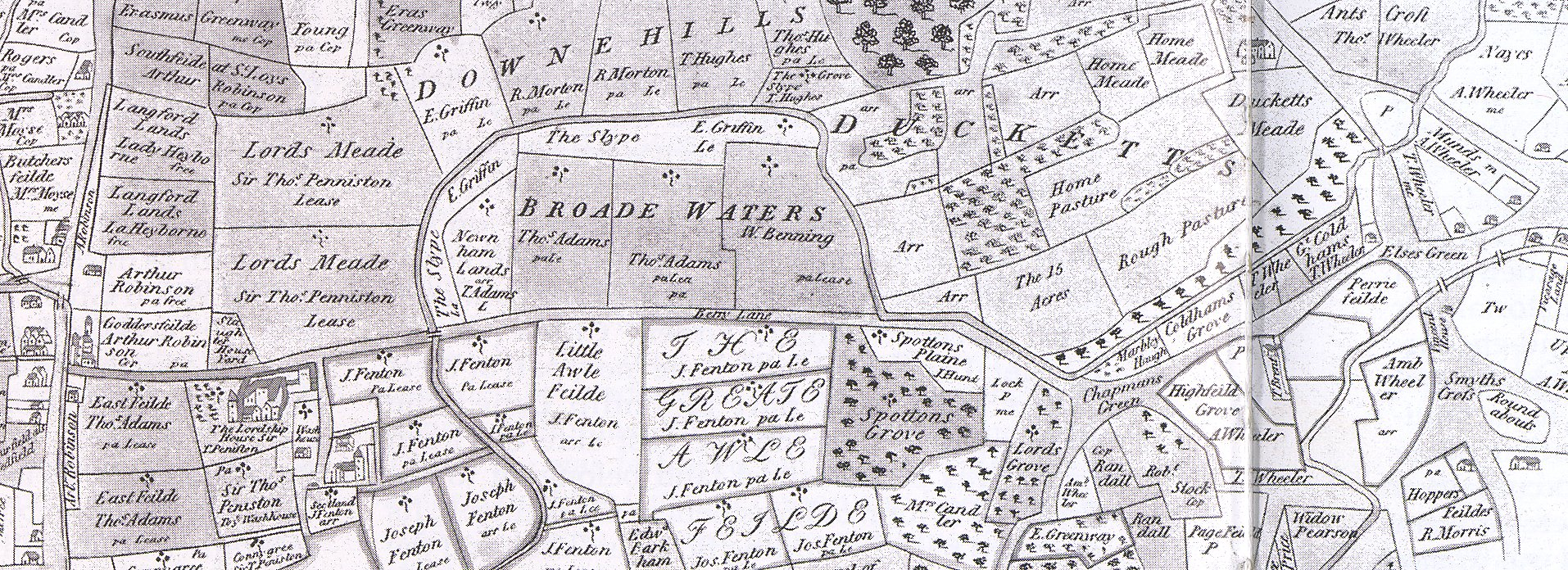
Earl of Dorset's Tottenham survey.

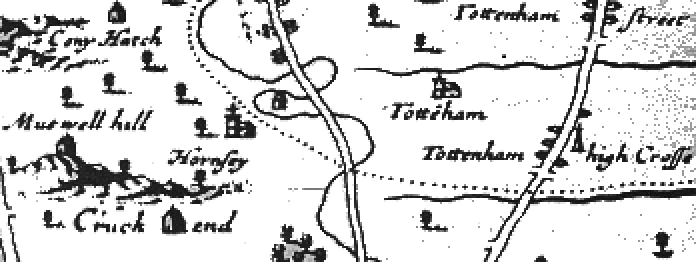
John Ogilby Map 1677

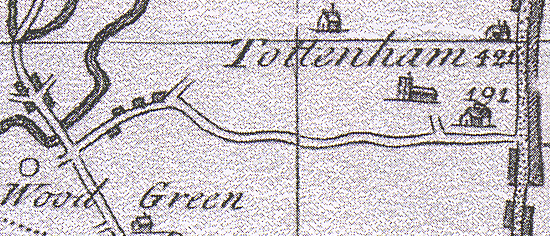
John Warburton's Map

John Carey's Map

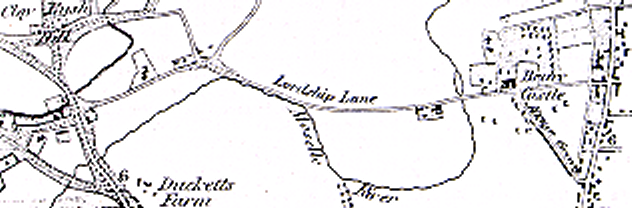
Greenwood's Map 1819

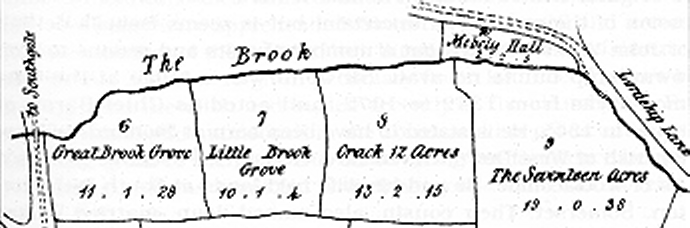
Ducketts Farm Fields c1846

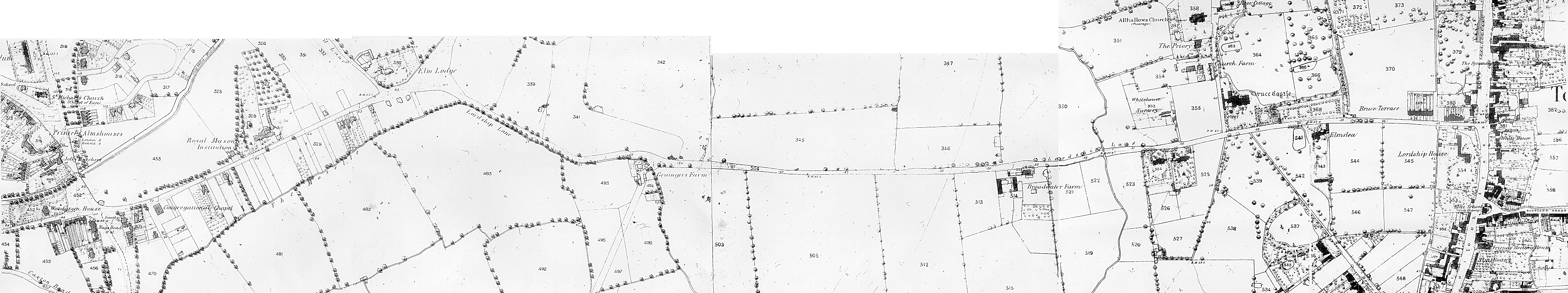
OS Edition 1 1864 25"

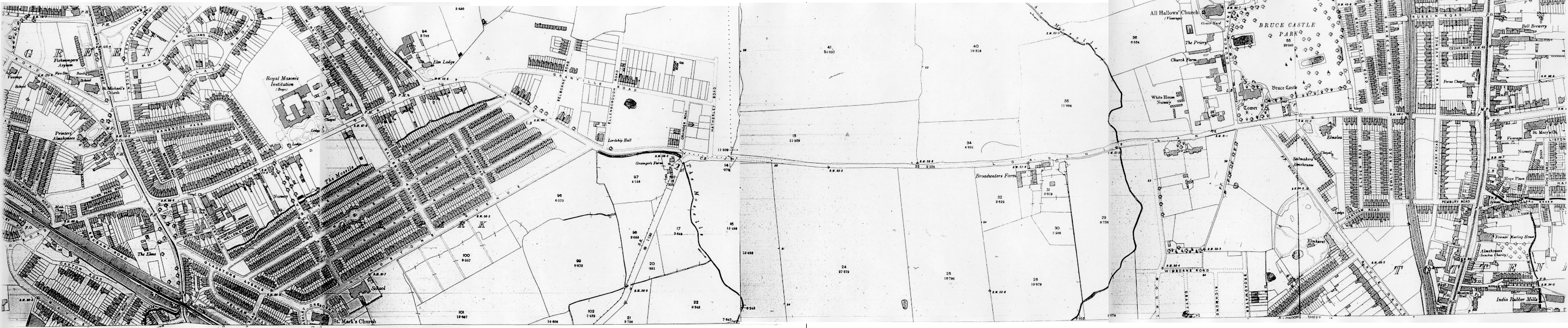
OS Edition 2 1895 25"

1. Survey of woods and groves in Edmonton, Tottenham and Enfield in Middlesex for the Dean and Chapter of St. Pauls by Israel Amyce, Surveyor, 1599; Gdl, MS 18798.
2. Map of Tottenham 1619 accompanying the Earl of Dorset's survey 6" BCM.
3. John Ogilby's Map of Middlesex c1677.
4. Edward Wyburd's Survey and Plan 1718.
5. John Warburton Map of the City of London and Middlesex 1749.
6. Topographic Map of The County of Middlesex 1754 by John Rocque (Reprinted by LMAS 1971).
7. Extract from John Carey Map of Middlesex 1793.
8. 1798 Tottenham Plan for Wyburd Survey by Henry Piper Spurling, by Jonathon and William Newton, 1817; BCM.
9. Facsimile of the OS's Drawings of the London Area 1799–1808 OSD 152/Serial No. 104 Hampstead 2" to 1-mile (1.6 km) London Topographical Survey Publication Number 144 (1991).
10. Milne's Land use map of Middlesex 1800.
11. A New Map of Middlesex by John Cary 1802.
12. Extract from a map of Tottenham, 1818. Drawn by Jonathon and William Newton for Robinson's History and Antiques of Tottenham. based on a 1798 survey.
13. Survey of Middlesex 1818 - 17 2" to 1-mile (1.6 km).
14. Greenwood's map of Middlesex, 1819.
15. OS 1822 Sheet 71 London (David and Charles Ed. 1969) was sheet 7 of 1" old series.
16. Tithe Commissioner's Map of Tottenham 1844.
17. Ducketts Farm Fields Map c1846.
18. OS 1864 of Middlesex, Parish of Tottenham 1st edition 25".
19. OS 1869-82 1st edition (25 inch).
20. OS 1873 1st edition, Middlesex sheet XII.
21. OS 1894–96, London sheet 3, Middlesex sheet VII 15 1:2500 (25 inch).
22. OS 1894–1937 Sheet III 14, 15, 16, 17, 26 (5 ft) Middlesex.
23. 1st edition (5 ft) Middlesex.
24. 2nd edition London Sheet III 14, 15, 16, 17, 26 (5 ft).
25. 1894-1922 Land Registry Series Sheet III 14, 15, 16, 17, 26 (5 ft).
26. OS 1896 (6 inch). May be County Series and three sheets: Essex, London & Middlesex.
27. Railways into Wood green circa 1900.
28. OS 1912 - 14 (3rd edition) (25 inch).
29. OS 1920 (6 inch). May be County Series and three sheets: Essex, London & Middlesex.
30. 1934-9 LCC Revised OS Sheet III 14, 15, 16, 17, 26 (5 ft).
31. 251935-7 OS Revised (5 ft) Sheet III 14, 15, 16, 17, 26.
32. LCC 1940 (25 inch).
33. OS 1946 (6 inch). May be County Series and three sheets: Essex, London & Middlesex.

Abbreviations
BCM	Bruce Castle Museum
LCC	London County Council
LMAS	London and Midland Archaeological Society, Museum of London.
OS	Ordnance Survey
