= Wood Green Crown Court =

Judicial building in Wood Green, London, England

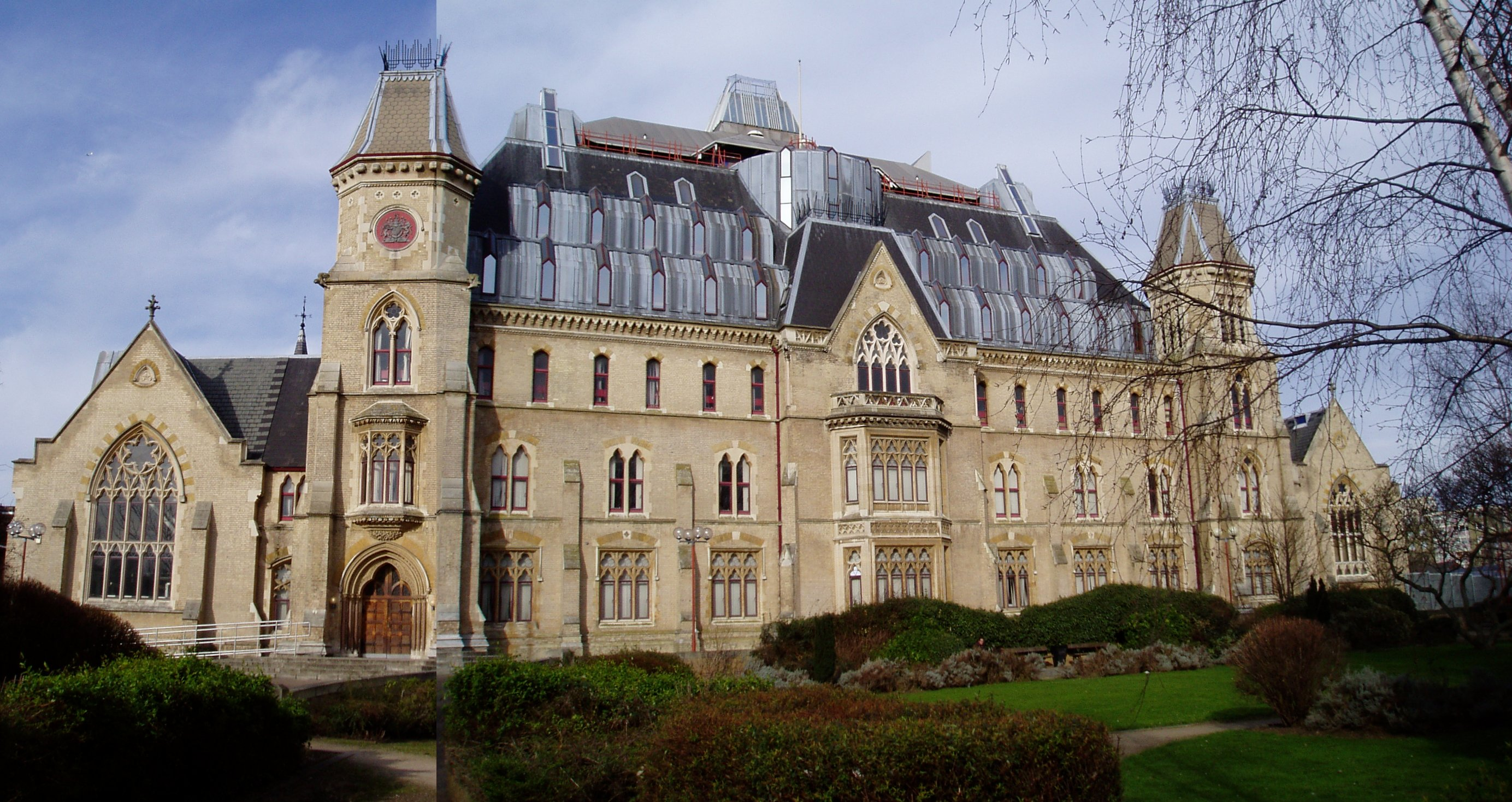
- Wood Green Crown Court

- Shown in London
- 51.5989°N 0.1053°W
- Location: Lordship Lane, Wood Green

History
- Built: 1865

Site notes
- Architect(s): Edwin Pearce and J. B. Wilson and Son
- Architectural style: Gothic Revival style

Wood Green Crown Court is a Crown Court venue which deals with criminal cases on Lordship Lane, Wood Green, London, England.

== History ==
The first building on the site was a mansion known as Lordship Lodge which was commissioned a shipbuilder, Joseph Fletcher, in the first half of the 19th century. After Fletcher died in 1852, the house was acquired by the Royal Masonic School for Boys which moved into the building in 1857. However, in the early 1860s, the school governors decided to demolish it and to commission a more substantial building for the site.

The new building was designed by Edwin Pearce and J. B. Wilson and Son in the Gothic Revival style, built in stone and completed in 1865. The design involved a symmetrical main frontage of nine bays facing onto Lordship Lane, with end bays projected forward as towers. The central bay, which was also slightly projected forward, featured oriel windows on the ground floor and the first floor, a four-part arched window with tracery on the second floor and a gable and a mansard roof above. The wings were fenestrated with tri-partite cusped mullioned and transomed windows on the ground floor, bi-partite mullioned windows on the first floor and lancet windows on the second floor, while the towers were fenestrated with oriel windows on the first floor and bi-partite mullioned windows on the second floor. In the late 19th century, the school governors decided to move to new premises on a site to the north of The Avenue in Bushey.

The Lordship Lane building was sold to the Home and Colonial School Society, which opened a training college for schoolmistresses there in 1904, and then to the Tottenham District Gas Company, which renamed it Woodall House after its chairman, Sir Colbert Woodall, in 1930. The Tottenham District Gas Company evolved to become Eastern Gas from whom Haringey London Borough Council acquired the site in 1974. The site was then redeveloped with the building being converted into a Crown Court at a cost of £15.3 million in 1989, and the rest of the site sold for housing. It was badly damaged in a fire later in 1989 and remodelled to create additional courtrooms in 1992.

In 2012, in a new initiative for the UK, 15 gang members were brought before the court, presented with evidence of the damage caused by gang violence and persuaded to change their behaviour. Then, in 2013, a juror in a sexual case being heard at Wood Green was jailed for two months after being found guilty of contempt of court for misusing the internet during a trial there, and, in 2015, Jermaine Baker was shot dead by police while trying to free a prisoner, Izzet Eren, who was on his way to the court in a prison van.

Notable cases include the trial and conviction of the scaffolder, Arthur Collins, in November 2017, on five counts of grievous bodily harm and nine of actual bodily harm; Collins was a former boyfriend of the television presenter, Ferne McCann.
