= Killing of Jermaine Baker =

2015 police shooting in London, England

Jermaine Baker (1986 or 1987 – 11 December 2015) was shot dead by a Metropolitan Police officer (known only as Whiskey 80) in Wood Green, London on 11 December 2015. Baker, who was unarmed, was shot during a police operation to prevent a suspected plot to free two prisoners being transported to Wood Green Crown Court. Baker's death led to an investigation by the Independent Police Complaints Commission, which was continued by its successor body the Independent Office for Police Conduct, and a criminal investigation which did not result in criminal charges being brought against the officer who shot Baker. A public inquiry into Baker's death launched in June 2021 and reported in July 2022, finding that the police operation in which Baker was killed had involved a series of failings, but that Baker's killing was nonetheless lawful.

In September 2023 the IOPC announced that officer Whiskey 80 would face gross misconduct proceedings in relation to the shooting - these were dropped in October 2025.

== Background ==
The majority of British police officers do not carry firearms. A minority of officers belong to specialist armed teams (the Specialist Firearms Command in London) and are trained to use weapons. Firearms duties are voluntary. Officers who discharge their weapons must be able to justify their actions as "reasonable force", used in self-defence or the defence of another. The decision to fire rests with the individual officer, who remains legally accountable for his actions. Police shootings are investigated by an oversight body—the Independent Police Complaints Commission (IPCC) in 2015, which was succeeded by the Independent Office for Police Conduct (IOPC) in 2018. In 2011, riots broke out after Mark Duggan was shot dead by police in nearby Tottenham.

Jermaine Baker was 28 years old. On 11 December 2015, he was sitting in the front seat of a car near Wood Green Crown Court in North London. He was part of a group that planned to free two prisoners due to arrive at the court in a prison van for a sentencing hearing in relation to firearms offences. The Metropolitan Police were aware of the plan and had intelligence that the gang had access to firearms and thus deployed armed officers to prevent the escape.

== Shooting and investigation ==
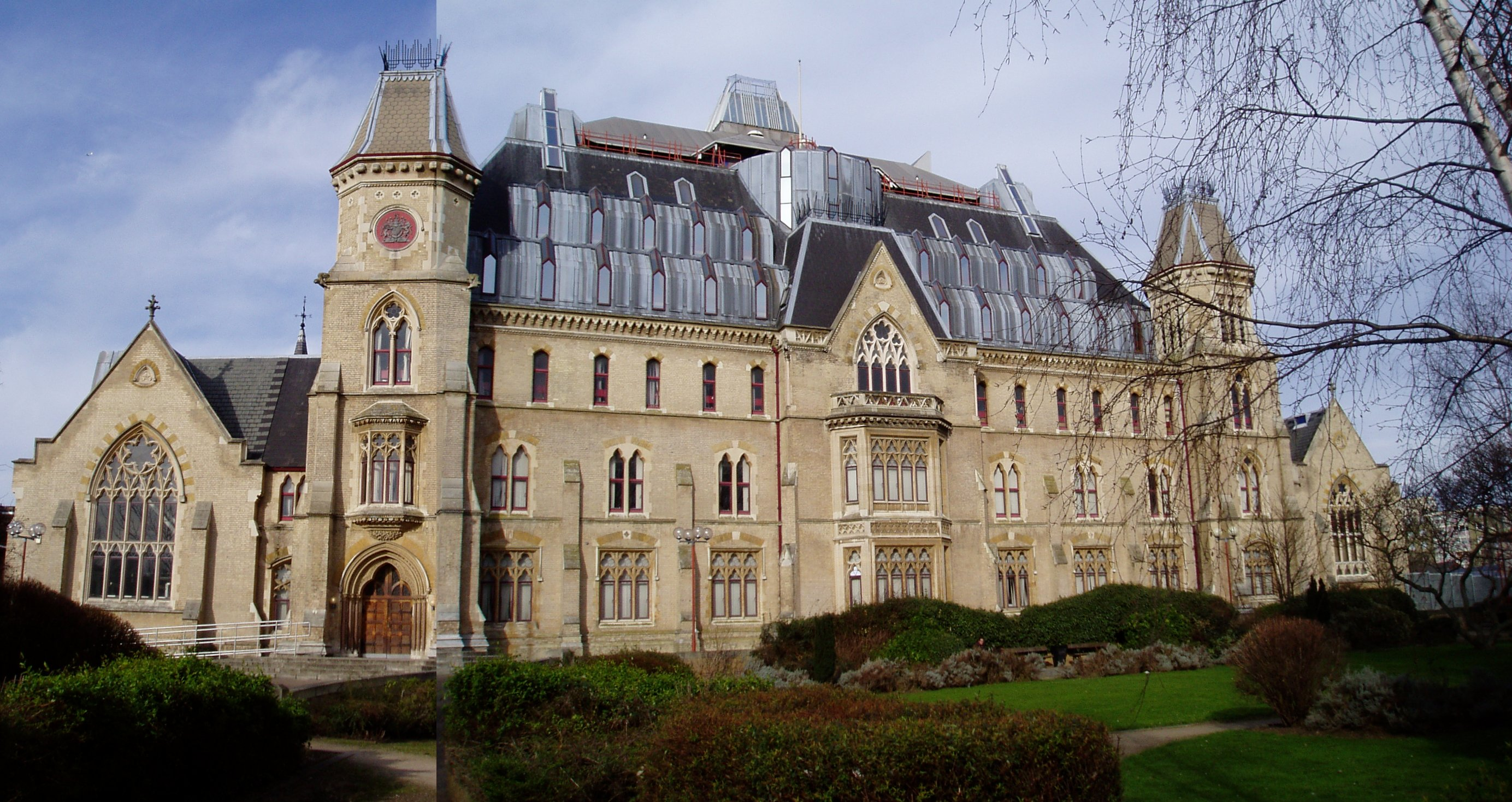
Wood Green Crown Court, near to which Baker was killed

When the police surrounded the vehicle at around 09:00, one officer (identified only by his callsign, Whiskey 80) opened fire. The single shot passed through Baker's wrist and neck. An air ambulance was called but Baker was pronounced dead at around 10:30. A replica Uzi submachine gun was found in the car but Baker was unarmed when he was shot.

In the days following the shooting, several media reports claimed that Baker was a gang member and linked him to Duggan, who was shot by police four years earlier. The Met stated on 18 December 2015 that Baker was not listed in their database of known gang members.

The IPCC investigation discovered that the police had placed a covert listening device in the vehicle in Baker's vehicle, which recorded the occupants saying they were not in possession of a real weapon. This information was not communicated to the armed officers who were to make the arrest. The officers were briefed that the occupants of the vehicle were armed and intended to use firearms to commit crime.

On 14 December, the Monday after the shooting, the Met suspended Whiskey80 at the request of the IPCC, who announced that they were investigating the incident as a homicide. The officer was arrested on 17 December and interviewed under caution. The Police Federation rejected the IPCC's characterisation of Baker's death as a homicide, and said the life of the arrested officer had been "thrown into disarray." Sir Bernard Hogan-Howe, the commissioner of the Metropolitan Police at the time, said the IPCC's decision to launch a homicide investigation was "unusual" and that he did not know the basis for the characterisation.

In November 2016, the IPCC referred the case to the Crown Prosecution Service (CPS) for a decision on whether to, indicating that it believed the investigation showed that a criminal offence may have been committed. In June 2017, the CPS concluded that the officer would not be charged, on the grounds that there was "no realistic prospect of a conviction". Whiskey 80 stated that he had acted in self-defence and had believed that Baker was reaching for a firearm; the CPS believed that a prosecution "could not prove to the required standard that W80 was being untruthful about his belief that Mr Baker was armed and reaching for a weapon". Baker's mother requested the CPS reconsider its decision under the Victims' Right to Review scheme, and the local member of parliament, David Lammy wrote to the attorney general to request a review of the CPS's decision. In March 2018, the CPS reconfirmed its decision not to bring charges. The IPCC forwarded its report to the Met to consider whether W80 should face disciplinary action.

== Aftermath ==
The IPCC and the Met held a public meeting on 17 December 2015, six days after the shooting, in response to community concerns similar to those which arose after Duggan's shooting in 2011. The meeting was chaired by community leaders. Cindy Butts represented the IPCC as the commissioner overseeing the investigation and Chief Superintendent Victor Olisa, the borough commander, represented the Met.

Four men were arrested as part of the operation and charged with conspiracy to aid the escape of two prisoners; two were also charged with possession of an imitation firearm. The two men they were trying to free were sentenced to 14 years in prison.

Shortly after the shooting, the officer went missing and attempted suicide. Following the officer's arrest, the Police Federation of England and Wales warned that if the officer was charged other armed officers could refuse to carry firearms in solidarity with W80 or out of concern that the law did not sufficiently protect them.

The officer in command of the firearms operation (known as the tactical firearms commander and identified by his callsign, FE16) in which Baker was killed retired from the Met in 2016. At the time of his retirement, the IPCC was considering bringing disciplinary action against him for gross misconduct in relation to the briefing he delivered to his officers before Baker's shooting. Baker's family brought a judicial review of the Met's decision to allow the officer to retire as retirement would put him beyond reach of disciplinary proceedings. The IPCC initially indicated it would support the proceedings to prevent the officer retiring, but later withdrew its support because it believed the allegations against the officer would meet the threshold for misconduct, but would not constitute gross misconduct, and so could not lead to the officer's dismissal. The High Court dismissed the claim in October 2016 on the grounds that the officer's right "to conduct his life as he wishes" outweighed the potential benefit to Baker's family of him remaining in post. Following the verdict, Baker's family and the charity Inquest accused the IPCC of betraying them, and of failing to hold the Met to account. The family's solicitors argued that the IPCC's statement was misleading and that the evidence indicated gross misconduct had occurred.

== Prosecution and disciplinary proceedings ==
In 2019 the IOPC, having inherited the investigation from the IPCC, directed the Met to bring disciplinary proceedings against W80 for misconduct. The IOPC believed there was a case for W80 to answer that he had used excessive force. W80 and the Met sought a judicial review of the IOPC's direction on the grounds that the IOPC had applied the law incorrectly. They argued that W80 was justified in his use of force as long as his belief that his life was in danger (from Baker reaching for a weapon) was honestly held; the IOPC argued that the belief must be both honest and reasonable. The High Court sided with W80 and quashed the IOPC's direction. The IOPC took the issue to the Court of Appeal. The IOPC continued to argue that police officers should be sanctioned for use of force in cases where their belief that force is required is unreasonable or irrational. Baker's family's solicitors argued that a finding in favour of the police, who argued that officers should not be sanctioned for use of force in such cases, would weaken police accountability. In October 2020, the Court of Appeal reversed the High Court judgement and ruled that disciplinary proceedings could commence.

The ruling confirmed that, in cases where officers claim to have made an honest mistake in concluding that they faced imminent danger, their use of force may nonetheless constitute misconduct if that belief is found to have been unreasonable. In response to the ruling, which reopened the possibility of disciplinary proceedings against the officer, the officer said he would apply for leave to appeal. The Supreme Court dismissed the appeal in July 2023.

In September 2023 the IOPC confirmed its decision that W80 must face disciplinary proceedings. - these were dropped in October 2025.

== Public inquiry ==
Logo of the inquiry

An inquest into Baker's death was opened on 22 December 2015 and adjourned pending the outcome of the IPCC's investigation. In February 2020, Home Secretary Priti Patel announced a public inquiry into Baker's death in place of an inquest. Baker's family criticised the four-year delay in announcing the inquiry, and called for the process to focus on the reasons why Baker was killed, the planning of the operation, and the level of force used by the officer. A pre-inquiry hearing in Spring 2021 heard that the officer who shot Baker had been appointed a firearms instructor with the SCO19 firearms unit. Baker's family's solicitors described the appointment as "surprising and troubling".

The inquiry opened in June 2021. On its first day, the inquiry was told about the police's covert recording which indicated that there was not a weapon in the vehicle in which Baker was killed, the officer's disappearance and suicide attempt, and the failure of two police teams involved in the operation to communicate with one another. Nearly 25,000 pages of written evidence were disclosed to the inquiry.

In July 2022, the inquiry found that the police operation in which Baker was killed had involved a series of failings, but that Baker's killing was nonetheless lawful. The inquiry found that the operation was not motivated by a commitment to public safety. Instead, the findings concluded, the police operation was motivated by a "delusional" belief that they were acting to eradicate lethal firearms from north London. The inquiry chair, Clement Goldstone, said he had found no evidence that race played a role in Baker's death.
