= Object lesson =

Teaching method

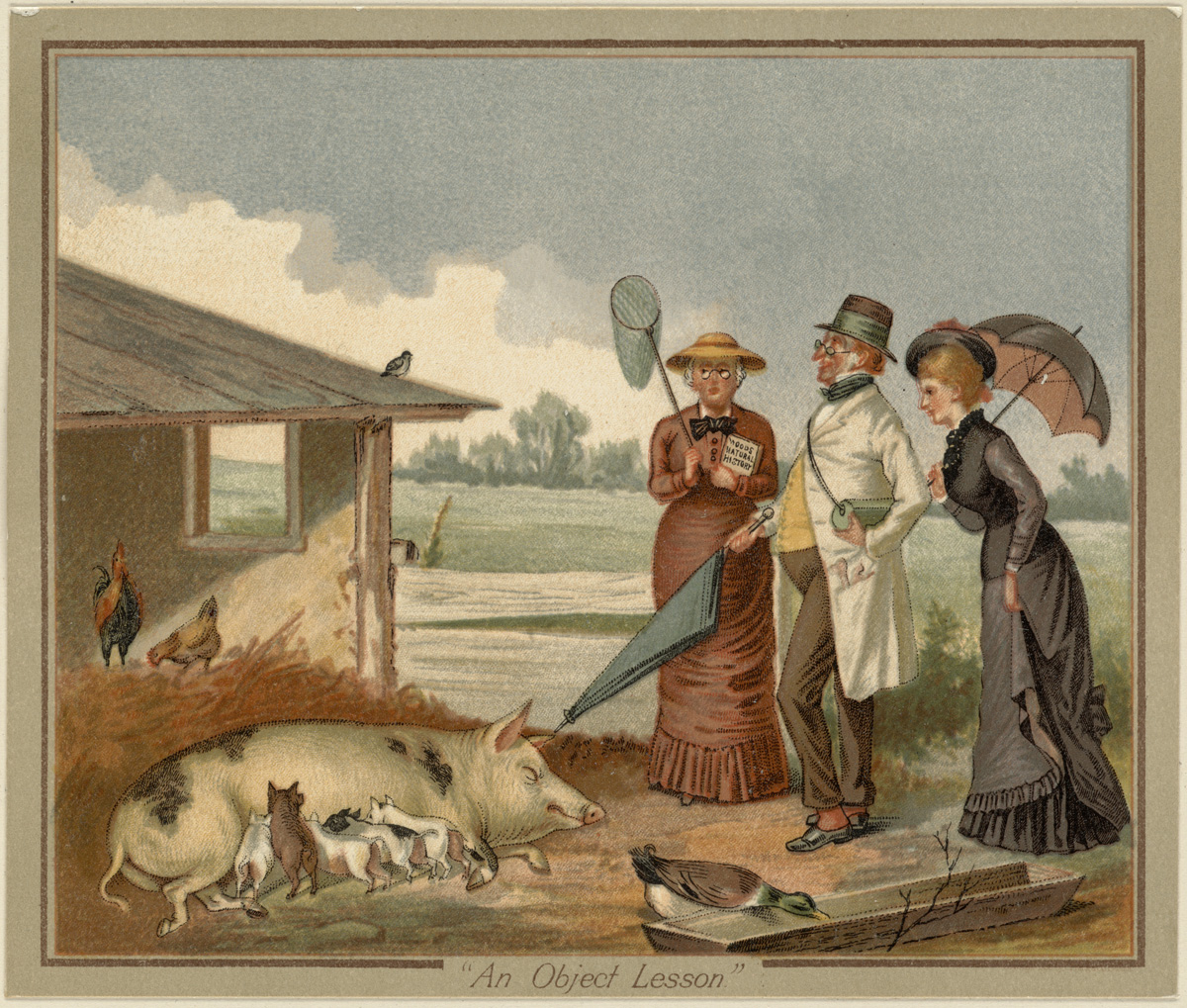
An Object Lesson by Boston Public Library

An object lesson is a teaching method that consists of using a physical object or visual aid as a discussion piece for a lesson. Object lesson teaching assumes that material things have the potential to convey information.

The object lesson approach is promoted in the educational philosophy of Johann Heinrich Pestalozzi, who held that teaching should begin with observation of objects which help students recognize concepts. In his teaching and writing he emphasized the concept of Anschauung, which may be understood as "sense training." Pestalozzi taught that children were first to develop sensation, then perception, notion, and finally volition, learning how to act morally based on an individual view of the world.

== History ==
Object lessons were important elements in teaching during the Victorian era of the mid- to late-nineteenth century. Elizabeth Mayo's books Lessons on Objects and Lessons on shells, which were about object lessons and were published during the Victorian Era, were revolutionary as they were the first to explain education to infant teachers. Mayo's book Lessons on Objects showed how young children could be introduced to new ideas by examining 100 objects like a wooden cube, a pin, a rubber or a piece of glass. The book supplied example dialogues between teacher and child and a list supplied for an object like a pin to get the children to recognize the parts and the qualities of this object.

By the early twentieth century, object lessons were widely used in religious instruction. Popular Baptist educator Clarence H. Woolston wrote a number of books about using everyday objects to aid instruction, including Seeing Truth: A Book of Object Lessons with Magical and Mechanical Effects, Penny Object Lessons: 25 Lessons for 25 Cents, and The Bible Object Book: A Book of Object Lessons Which Are Different, Written in Plain English and in Common Words.
