= Highbury Fields School =

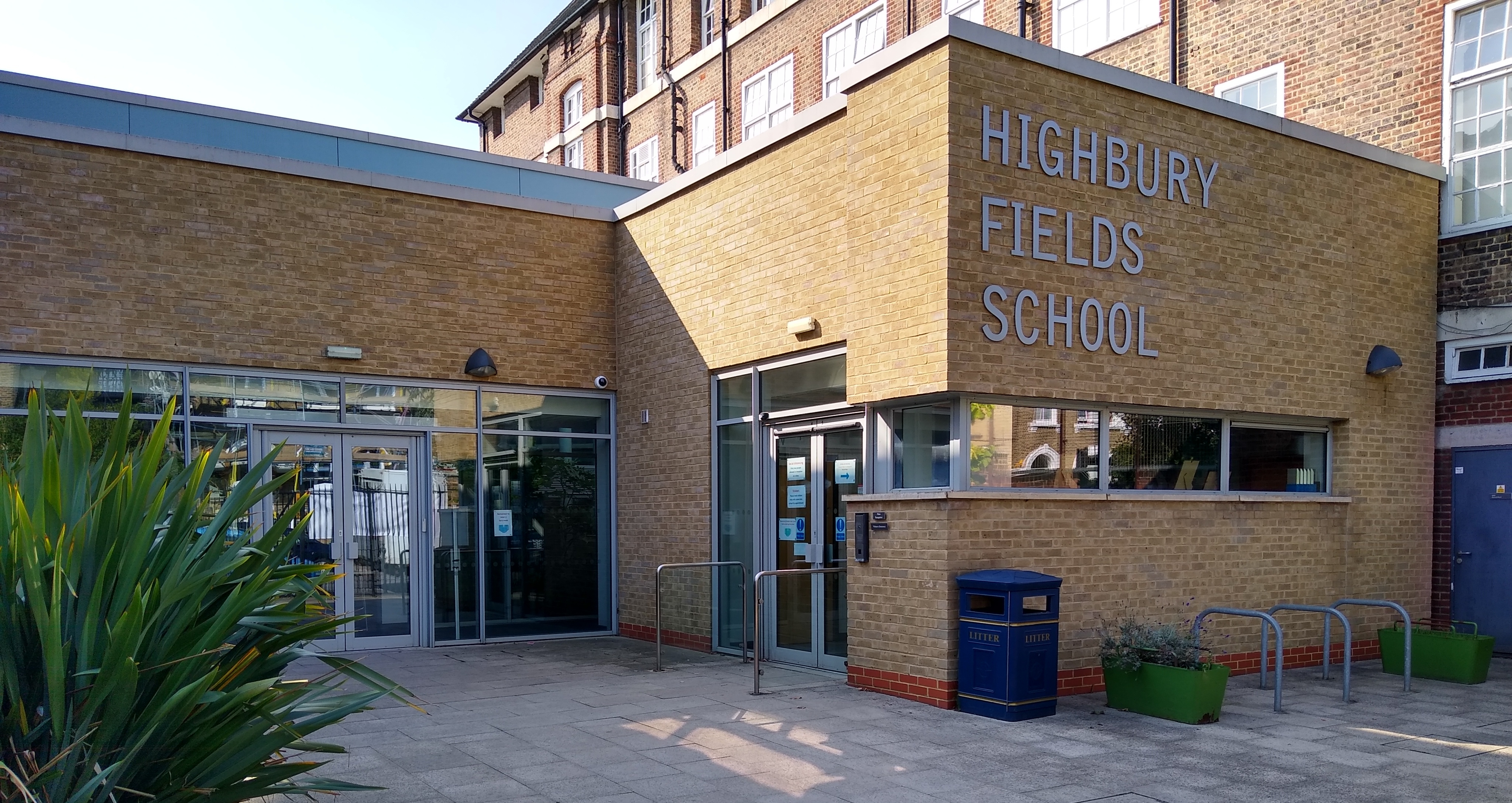

Location
- Highbury Hill; Highbury, London, N5 1AR; England
- Coordinates: 51.55273°N 0.10111°W

Information
- Type: Community school
- Local authority: Islington
- Department for Education URN: 100455 Tables
- Ofsted: Reports
- Headteacher: Tim Fox
- Gender: Girls
- Age: 11 to 18
- Enrolment: 768 as of December 2022
- Website: www.highburyfields.islington.sch.uk

Highbury Fields School (formerly Highbury Hill High School) is a secondary school for girls and coeducational sixth form, located next to Highbury Fields in the Highbury area of the London Borough of Islington, England.

The School has specialisms in Science and Mathematics, and is also a Leading Edge Partnership school.

Highbury Fields School offers GCSEs as programmes of study for pupils. Students in the sixth form have the option to study from a range of A Levels which are provided as part of the Islington Sixth Form Consortium (iC6).

== History ==
The predecessor to Highbury Hill School was founded in 1844 by the Home and Colonial School Society. It followed the educational ideas introduced to England by Charles and Elizabeth Mayo with the school based on Gray's Inn Road. In 1863, it became a single-sex school for girls, renamed the Mayo School.

In 1894, the school moved to Highbury Hill House and was renamed Highbury Hill School. The school buildings were extended in 1899, and additional premises for a nursery and a training college were acquired on Highbury Hill and Highbury New Park.

London County Council took over the school in 1928, rebuilding it on the Highbury Hill site. During World War II, it was evacuated to Huntingdon Grammar school, now Hinchingbrooke School.

=== Highbury Fields School ===
In 1979, the Inner London Education Authority began a process of reorganising secondary schools, including Highbury Hill School which was merged with Shelburne High School to form Highbury Fields School. The former Shelburne High School premises at 69 Tollington Road are now converted to residential use, those on Benwell Road have been incorporated into London Metropolitan University.

Highbury Fields became a comprehensive in 1981. Today it is a community school administered by Islington London Borough Council.

== Notable former pupils ==
- Little Simz, actress, rapper and singer
- Kemi Adeosun former Minister of Finance Nigeria

=== Highbury Hill High School ===
- Edith Clara Batho, Principal of Royal Holloway College, University of London from 1945 to 1962
- Michelle Collins, EastEnders well-known actress, who played Cindy Beale, and Stella Price in Coronation Street
- Eileen Hickman-Smith, artist
- Mary Kerridge, actress
- Andrea Levy, novelist
- Sandy Ratcliff, EastEnders actress who played Sue Osman, expelled at the age of 12
