= Eileen Hickman-Smith =

British artist (1909-1970)

Eileen Hickman-Smith (1909–1970) was a British artist and sculptor.

== Biography ==
Hickman-Smith was born at Islington in north London and was the daughter of Annie, a musician and of the painter and author Arthur Ernest Hickman-Smith, (1876–1956). She was educated at Highbury Hill High School and studied art at the Regent Street Polytechnic in central London where she won a medal for sculpture. As a sculptor she created figures and reliefs in stone and bronze, and also painted in oils. Hickman-Smith exhibited works at the Royal Academy, with the Royal Society of British Artists, the Women's International Art Club, the Society of Women Artists, at the Whitechapel Gallery and with the Islington Art Circle. She lived the majority of her life in the Highbury area of Islington and the town hall there has a panel by her.
