= Jane Roadknight =

English schoolteacher and inspector of schools

- Born: 1852; Leeds, England
- Died: 17 March 1929 (aged 76–77); Winshill, England
- Occupation: School inspector
- Spouse: Tom Roadknight

Jane Annie Roadknight born Jane Annie Powell (1852 – 17 March 1929) was a British schoolteacher and inspector of schools. She was an advocate of the kindergarten and Froebel approach to education.

== Life ==
Roadknight is believed to have been born in Leeds in 1852 or 1853. Her parents were George and Eliza Powell. She went into t St Mary's national school, Quarry Hill, Leeds as a girl pupil teacher in 1865. She was still there as a teenager in 18721 when she was awarded a first class queen's scholarship. By the following year she had a kindergarten certificate and she went on to attend the Home and Colonial College in London. There she learned about new ideas in education created by Heinrich Pestalozzi and Friedrich Froebel.

In 1883 she married Tom Roadknight who was a maltster. They married in Kings Norton and she went on to work at Nottingham's Blue Bell Hill Board school in 1885 which had opened two years before. Her effect on the school was appreciated and inspections of the school led to her being promoted to be the Nottingham school board's inspector of kindergarten and needlework in 1893. When the Nottingham educational authority was formed she became their inspector for infant education. She is creditted with introducing play into teaching and to make the tone of the classroom less intimidating. She held the position of infant inspector until 1919 when she stood down because of her health.

In 1905 she had founded the Nottingham Froebel Society which demonstrated her enthusiasm for her approach.

Roadknight died in Winshill in 1929.
