= Elizabeth Mayo =

English educational reformer and evangelical writer

- Born: 18 June 1793; London, England
- Died: 1 September 1865 (aged 72); Malvern, England
- Known for: first female trainer of teachers in England

Elizabeth Mayo (18 June 1793 – 1 September 1865) was a British teacher and educational reformer. She was credited in the Hadow Reports with being one of the founders of the formal education of infant teachers in Britain. She was the first woman in England to be employed to train teachers.

== Life and work ==
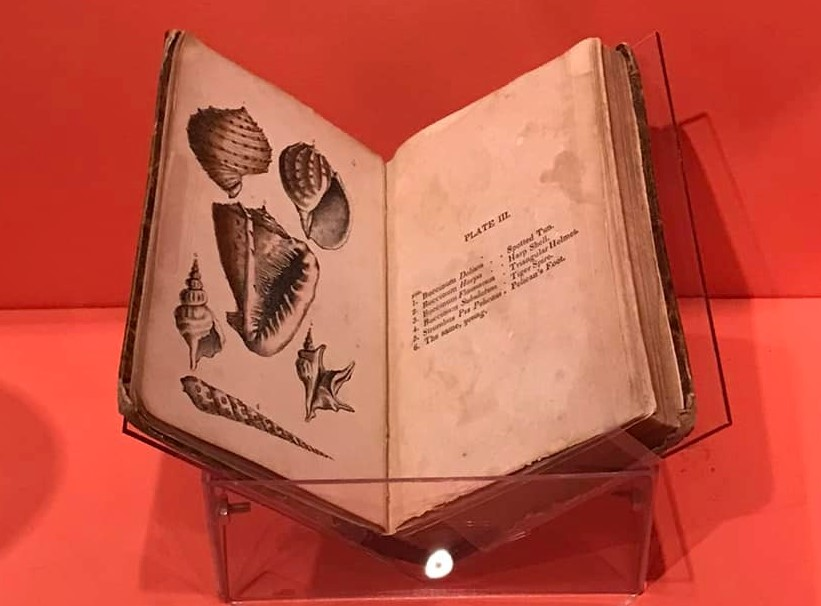
Lessons on shells; full title Lessons on shells: as given in a Pestalozzian school, at Cheam, Surrey, a book written by Elizabeth Mayo and published in 1834; photo taken at Winterthur Museum, Garden and Library in 2022.

Mayo was born at 1 Hammet Street, Aldgate in London, on 18 June 1793. Her father was a lawyer, Charles Mayo and his wife, Elizabeth Knowlys. Charles Mayo who was Elizabeth's brother returned from Switzerland to work with her. Charles had lived with Johann Heinrich Pestalozzi from 1819 to 1822 at Yverdon and he was inspired by his ideas. The two siblings were credited in the Hadow Reports with founding the formal education of infant teachers in Britain.

Mayo was the first woman in England to be employed to train teachers. Her books Lessons on Objects and Lessons on shells, on object lessons, were revolutionary as they were the first to explain education to infant teachers. Mayo's book Lessons on Objects showed how young children could be introduced to new ideas by examining 100 objects like a wooden cube, a pin, a rubber or a piece of glass. The book supplied example dialogues between teacher and child and a list supplied for an object like a pin to get the children to recognize the parts and the qualities of this object. By 1831 her book had such success that John Frost was creating a plagiarised, edited or improved version for the American market.

Charles, Elizabeth, James Pierrepont Greaves, and John Stuckey Reynolds founded the Home and Colonial School Society in Gray's Inn Road in 1836, which was an Anglican society dedicated to the ideas of Pestalozzi; and Elizabeth's publications introduced educational ideas that ignored the idea of rote-learning. The new organization included a model infant school where the ideas could be developed, and Elizabeth took a supervisory role. More than her brother, Elizabeth argued that educational improvements must include a religious aspect. It was reported that by the end of the 1840s that nearly every vacancy was being filled by graduates from the Mayo institution. Known as the Home and Colunial Training College it was the only teaching establishment using Pestalozzi's object based teaching methods. Pestalozzi was using illustrations but the Mayo siblings insisted on the value of actual objects. This technique was thought to be particularly valuable with under-privileged students who could aspire to moving from just naming the parts of an object to writing an essay about its qualities.

=== Death and legacy ===
Mayo died in Malvern in 1865.

Highbury Fields School in London is credited with being a successor institution to the educational ideas introduced by Charles and Elizabeth Mayo.

== Works ==
- Lessons on Objects
- On Shells
- Lessons on Scripture Prints 1840
- On Miracles 1845
- On Religious Instruction 1849
- Model Lessons for Infant Schools 1848–50.
- Practical Remarks on Infant Education (with her brother) 1837.
