= Victor Olisa =

British retired police officer

Dr. Victor Olisa QPM is a retired senior police officer who served in the Metropolitan Police in London, England. He served as borough commander in the London Borough of Haringey. Olisa was appointed borough commander in March 2013 in a decision made "at the highest level" of the force during the run-up to the inquest into the death of Mark Duggan who had been shot dead by police in the borough in 2011. Duggan's death led to large-scale civil unrest in Tottenham, north London which, in turn, escalated to large-scale rioting across England.

Olisa started his police career at Surrey Constabulary in south-east England after leaving university in 1982. In June 2015 he was one of five Borough Commanders in the Metropolitan Police from a black or ethnic minority background.

Olisa retired from the police service in November 2017.

== Early life ==
Olisa was born in Warri in Delta State in Nigeria. His grandfather was a police officer.

== Police career ==
Olisa joined Surrey Police in 1982 after graduating from Royal Holloway, University of London. In 1990 he transferred to the City of London Police as a detective inspector in the Fraud Squad.

In 2003, Olisa was seconded to the Home Office working in the Office for Criminal Justice Reform helping to develop models to improve the effectiveness of Stop and Search.

In 2005 he was awarded a PhD in criminology by the London School of Economics.

He transferred to the Metropolitan Police on promotion to superintendent working in the London Borough of Southwark. In 2010 Olisa took over the responsibility of leading the Metropolitan Police's Stop and Search Team. In 2012 he transferred to the London Borough of Bexley as borough commander promoted to chief superintendent. In March 2013, Olisa was appointed as borough commander in Haringey. Of his appointment and on leaving Bexley after less than a year in post he said a decision had been made, "at the highest level. "With all the issues around the inquest hearing of the Mark Duggan shooting, that puts Haringey in a different perspective to Bexley. "I think it’s a vote of confidence moving me from here to head that up at such a sensitive time".
