= Home and Colonial School Society =

Former school in London

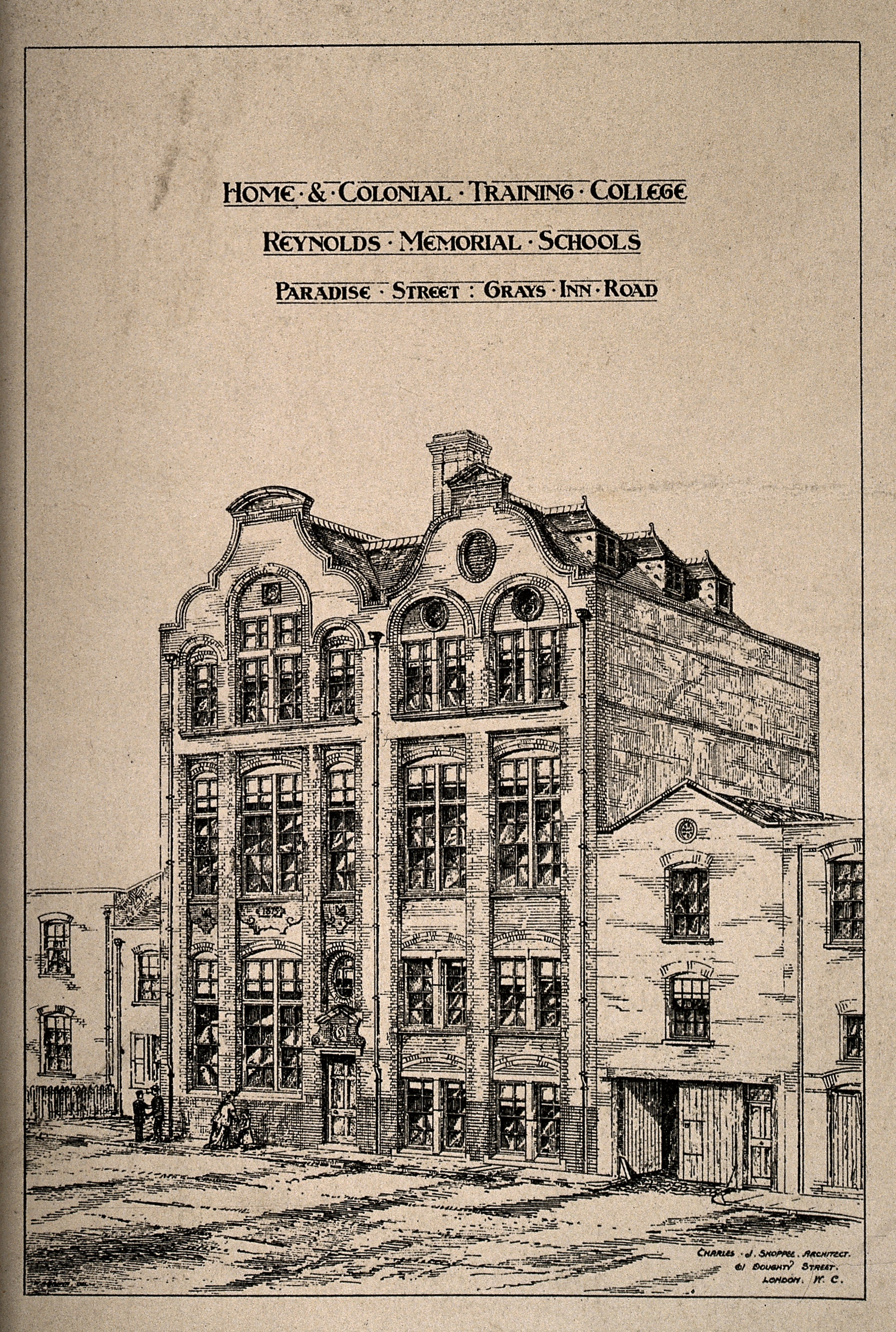
Home and Colonial Training College, Paradise Street, Gray's Inn Road.

The Home and Colonial School Society was a Church of England institution founded in 1836 by Elizabeth Mayo, Charles Mayo, James Pierrepont Greaves and John S. Reynolds for the education of children and the training of teachers especially by then novel methods proposed by Pestalozzi. It had a training college located on Gray's Inn Road in London, where it established a 'model infant school'. In 1894 the school moved to Highbury Hill House and was renamed Highbury Hill High School for Girls (it survives today as Highbury Fields School, a girls' secondary school in Islington).

In 1894 the Society became part of the National Froebel Union.

== Notable people ==
- Hana Catherine Mullens, who worked in zenana missions in British India
- Charlotte Mason, British educational philosopher and founder of the Parents National Education Union
- Marianne Bernard, mistress at Girton College
- Jane Roadknight, school inspector in Nottingham
