= British Spanish =

British Spanish or Spanish British may refer to:

- Spain–United Kingdom relations
- Spanish language in the United Kingdom

British Spanish, British Spaniards, Spanish British, or Spanish Britons may refer to:

- Britons in Spain
- Spaniards in the United Kingdom

== See also ==
- Latin Americans in the United Kingdom
