= Almuñecar International School =

School in Granada, Spain

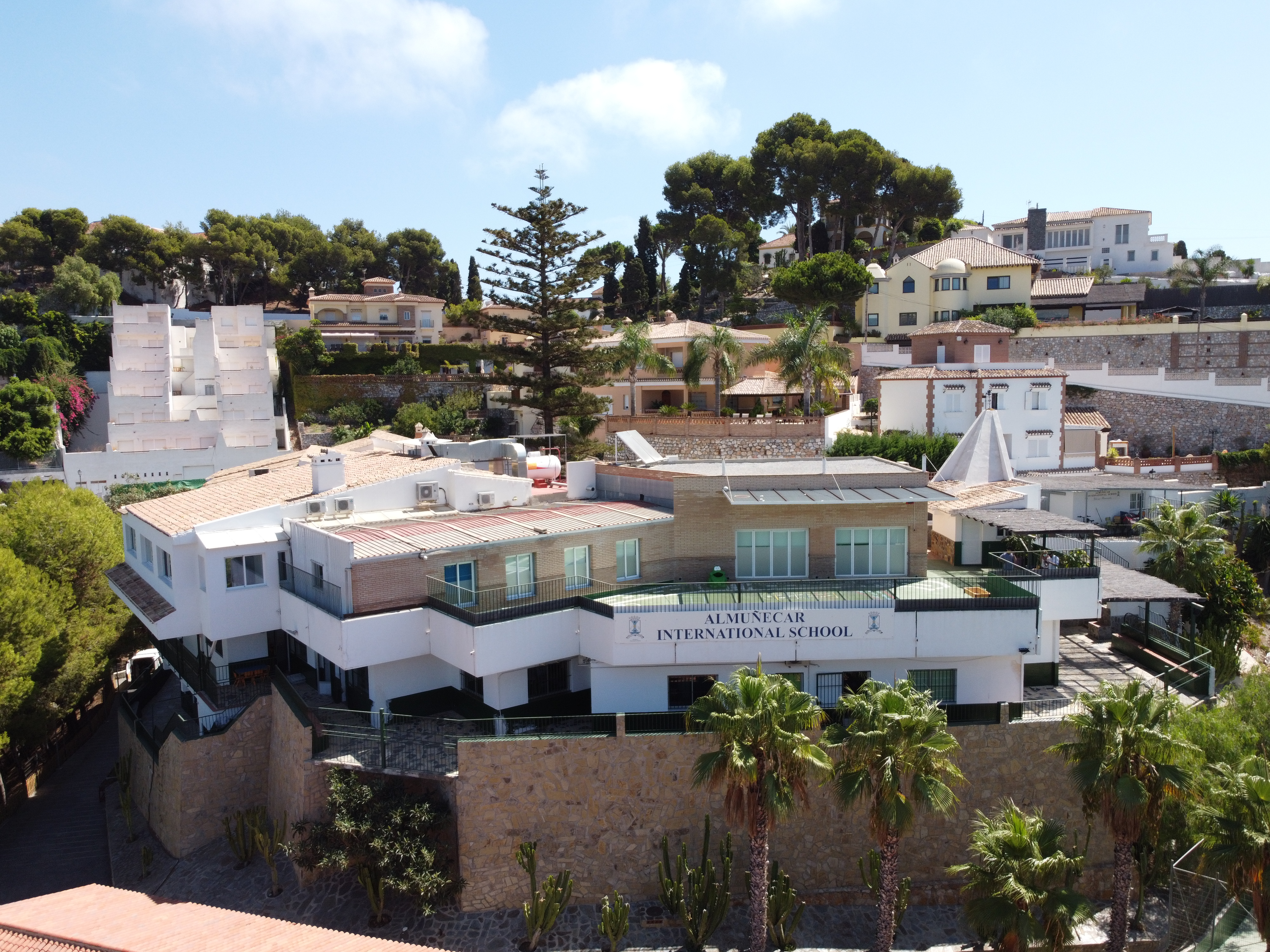
The view of Almunecar International School from the front

Almuñécar International School is a private international Primary and Secondary school on the Costa Tropical in Granada province, Spain. The school is a member of the National Association of British Schools in Spain (NABSS). The school serves a wide catchment area including Torrox, Nerja, Motril and Granada. The school was founded in 1989 and is owned by a conglomerate of parents.

Education at the school is grounded on the National Curriculum, Spanish education requirements.

School Address:

Calle Pinariego, 1, 18690, Almunecar, Granada, Spain.

http://www.almunecarinternationalschool.org/

== Notable people ==
- Miguel Yanguas, Padel Player

== See also ==
- Instituto Español Vicente Cañada Blanch - Spanish international school in London
- British migration to Spain
