= The Schools Index =

International private school publication

- Editor: Fiona McKenzie
- Categories: Schools; Private schools International schools
- Frequency: Annual
- Publisher: Carfax Education
- Founder: Alexander Nikitich
- First issue: 2020; 6 years ago (contract-published by Spear's); 2023; 3 years ago (on its own)
- Country: United Kingdom
- Language: English
- Website: https://www.schools-index.com/

The Schools Index is an annual publication that lists internationally notable private schools and international schools. Published by Carfax Education, it is often considered a global list of the most prestigious schools of the world. In 2025 Time Out called the Index "one of the most respected rankings" and "a prestigious list of the very best private schools in the world".

The index is intended as a resource for parents in choosing schools for their children. The publication includes information on each school's curriculum and fees. It also provides logistical details such as travel time to local airports.

== History ==
The Schools Index was started in 2020 by Carfax Education and initially contract-published by Spear's. Until 2023 it was also sometimes known as the Spear's Schools Index.

In 2022, the Schools Index incorporated an assessment of how effectively schools managed the disruptions caused by the COVID-19 pandemic over the previous two years.

== Selection criteria ==
The Schools Index lists schools based on factors such as academic performance, facilities, university preparation, and overall educational ethos. Additionally, the guide evaluates schools on their ability to prepare pupils for life beyond academia.

== Categories ==
The Schools Index categorizes schools by region, covering areas such as the United Kingdom, Switzerland, Europe, the U.S., Middle East, China, Southeast Asia, and other regions. For 2023, it lists the top 125 schools in these areas in its main list. A supplementary list of 25 "schools to watch" was introduced in the 2023 edition of the Index, taking the total number of schools included in the Index to 150. The Schools to Watch List is separated into four categories: Ones to Watch, Small Gems, Something Different, and New Schools.

== Main List ==
Schools included in Main List of The Schools Index throughout the years
School	Country	Most recent category	2024	2023	2022	2021	2020
Benenden School	UK	UK Senior Schools	Yes	Yes	Yes		
Brighton College	UK	UK Senior Schools	Yes	Yes	Yes	Yes	
Charterhouse	UK	UK Senior Schools	Yes	Yes	Yes	Yes	Yes
Cheltenham Ladies' College	UK	UK Senior Schools	Yes	Yes	Yes	Yes	Yes
Concord College	UK	UK Senior Schools		Yes			
Down House School	UK	UK Senior Schools	Yes	Yes		Yes	Yes
Dulwich College	UK	UK Senior Schools	Yes	Yes			
Eton College	UK	UK Senior Schools	Yes	Yes	Yes	Yes	Yes
Fettes College	UK	UK Senior Schools	Yes	Yes			Yes
Gordonstoun	UK	UK Senior Schools	Yes	Yes	Yes	Yes	
Haileybury and Imperial Service College	UK	UK Senior Schools	Yes				
Harrow School	UK	UK Senior Schools	Yes	Yes	Yes	Yes	Yes
The King's School, Canterbury	UK	UK Senior Schools	Yes	Yes	Yes	Yes	Yes
Marlborough College	UK	UK Senior Schools	Yes	Yes	Yes	Yes	Yes
Millfield School	UK	UK Senior Schools	Yes	Yes	Yes	Yes	Yes
Milton Abbey	UK	UK Senior Schools				Yes	Yes
Oundle School	UK	UK Senior Schools	Yes	Yes	Yes	Yes	Yes
The Perse School	UK	UK Senior Schools		Yes			
Radley College	UK	UK Senior Schools	Yes	Yes			
Rugby School	UK	UK Senior Schools	Yes	Yes	Yes	Yes	Yes
Sevenoaks School	UK	UK Senior Schools	Yes	Yes	Yes	Yes	Yes
Shrewsbury School	UK	UK Senior Schools	Yes	Yes			
St. Mary's School, Ascot	UK	UK Senior Schools	Yes				
Tonbridge School	UK	UK Senior Schools	Yes	Yes			
Uppingham School	UK	UK Senior Schools	Yes	Yes	Yes		
Wellington College	UK	UK Senior Schools	Yes	Yes	Yes	Yes	Yes
Winchester College	UK	UK Senior Schools	Yes	Yes	Yes	Yes	Yes
Wycombe Abbey School	UK	UK Senior Schools	Yes	Yes	Yes	Yes	Yes
King's College School, Wimbledon	UK	London Schools	Yes	Yes			
Latymer Upper School	UK	London Schools					Yes
North London Collegiate School	UK	London Schools	Yes	Yes			
St. Paul's School	UK	London Schools	Yes	Yes	Yes	Yes	Yes
St. Paul's Girls' School	UK	London Schools	Yes	Yes	Yes	Yes	Yes
Westminster School	UK	London Schools	Yes	Yes	Yes	Yes	Yes
Ardvreck School	UK	UK Prep Schools				Yes	
Cothill House	UK	UK Prep Schools				Yes	Yes
Cottesmore School	UK	UK Prep Schools	Yes	Yes	Yes	Yes	
Dragon School	UK	UK Prep Schools		Yes	Yes		Yes
Elstree School	UK	UK Prep Schools	Yes				
Godstowe School	UK	UK Prep Schools	Yes				
Hanford School	UK	UK Prep Schools	Yes	Yes	Yes	Yes	
Lambrook School	UK	UK Prep Schools	Yes	Yes	Yes		
Ludgrove School	UK	UK Prep Schools	Yes	Yes	Yes	Yes	Yes
Port Regis School	UK	UK Prep Schools	Yes	Yes			Yes
Summer Fields	UK	UK Prep Schools	Yes	Yes	Yes	Yes	Yes
Sunningdale School	UK	UK Prep Schools	Yes				
Windlesham House School	UK	UK Prep Schools	Yes				
Arnold House School	UK	London Prep Schools	Yes				
Falkner House (Girls Section)	UK	London Prep Schools	Yes	Yes	Yes	Yes	Yes
Glendower Preparatory School	UK	London Prep Schools	Yes				
The Hall School	UK	London Prep Schools	Yes				
Knightsbridge School, London	UK	London Prep Schools		Yes	Yes	Yes	Yes
Sussex House School	UK	London Prep Schools	Yes	Yes	Yes	Yes	Yes
Thomas's School Battersea	UK	London Prep Schools			Yes	Yes	Yes
Wetherby Preparatory School	UK	London Prep Schools					Yes
Aiglon College	Switzerland	Swiss Schools	Yes	Yes	Yes	Yes	Yes
Collège Alpin Beau Soleil	Switzerland	Swiss Schools	Yes	Yes	Yes		Yes
Brillantmont International School	Switzerland	Swiss Schools				Yes	Yes
Collège Champittet	Switzerland	Swiss Schools	Yes	Yes	Yes	Yes	
Ecole Internationale de Genève	Switzerland	Swiss Schools	Yes	Yes	Yes	Yes	Yes
La Garenne International School	Switzerland	Swiss Schools	Yes	Yes	Yes	Yes	Yes
Inter-community School Zurich	Switzerland	Swiss Schools		Yes	Yes	Yes	Yes
Leysin American School	Switzerland	Swiss Schools					Yes
Lyceum Alpinum Zuoz	Switzerland	Swiss Schools	Yes	Yes	Yes	Yes	Yes
Le Régent International School	Switzerland	Swiss Schools	Yes		Yes	Yes	
Institut auf dem Rosenberg	Switzerland	Swiss Schools	Yes	Yes	Yes	Yes	Yes
Institut Le Rosey	Switzerland	Swiss Schools	Yes	Yes	Yes	Yes	Yes
St. George's International School	Switzerland	Swiss Schools	Yes	Yes			
Aloha College	Spain	Europe	Yes		Yes		Yes
Amadeus School	Austria	Europe		Yes		Yes	
Ermitage International School	France	Europe	Yes	Yes			
ICS Milan International School	Italy	Europe	Yes	Yes			
International School of Monaco	Monaco	Europe	Yes	Yes	Yes	Yes	Yes
International School of Nice	France	Europe	Yes	Yes			Yes
The International School of Paris	France	Europe			Yes	Yes	Yes
King's College, Soto de Viñuelas	Spain	Europe	Yes	Yes			
The English International College	Spain	Europe				Yes	
Mougins British International School	France	Europe			Yes	Yes	Yes
Schule Schloss Salem	Germany	Europe	Yes	Yes	Yes		Yes
Sotogrande International School	Spain	Europe		Yes			
St. George's British International School	Italy	Europe	Yes	Yes	Yes	Yes	Yes
St. John's International School	Belgium	Europe		Yes			
St. Julian's School	Portugal	Europe	Yes	Yes	Yes		
Letovo School	Russia	Europe	Yes	Yes	Yes	Yes	Yes
St. Louis School	Italy	Europe			Yes	Yes	
St. Peter's International School	Portugal	Europe	Yes	Yes			
The British School of Brussels	Belgium	Europe	Yes	Yes	Yes	Yes	Yes
The British School of Milan	Italy	Europe	Yes	Yes	Yes	Yes	Yes
The British School of Paris	France	Europe	Yes	Yes			
Vienna International School	Austria	Europe	Yes				
Brighton College, Abu Dhabi	UAE	Middle East	Yes	Yes	Yes	Yes	
British International School, Riyadh	Saudi Arabia	Middle East	Yes	Yes	Yes		
The British School Al Khubairat	UAE	Middle East	Yes	Yes	Yes		
British School of Bahrain	Bahrain	Middle East	Yes				
British School Muscat	Oman	Middle East	Yes	Yes	Yes	Yes	
Brummana High School	Lebanon	Middle East				Yes	Yes
Cranleigh School Abu Dhabi	UAE	Middle East	Yes	Yes	Yes	Yes	Yes
Doha College	Qatar	Middle East	Yes	Yes	Yes	Yes	Yes
Dubai College	UAE	Middle East	Yes	Yes	Yes	Yes	Yes
Jumeirah College	UAE	Middle East	Yes	Yes	Yes		
Jumeirah English Speaking School (Arabian Ranches)	UAE	Middle East	Yes	Yes	Yes	Yes	
King's Academy	Jordan	Middle East		Yes	Yes	Yes	Yes
Misk School	Saudi Arabia	Middle East	Yes				
Nord Anglia International School Dubai	UAE	Middle East	Yes	Yes	Yes		
North London Collegiate School Dubai	UAE	Middle East	Yes	Yes	Yes		
Repton School Dubai	UAE	Middle East	Yes	Yes	Yes	Yes	
St. Christopher's School, Bahrain	Bahrain	Middle East		Yes	Yes	Yes	
Swiss International Scientific School in Dubai	UAE	Middle East	Yes	Yes	Yes		
Diocesan Boys' School	Hong Kong	China & Hong Kong	Yes				
Diocesan Girls' School	Hong Kong	China & Hong Kong	Yes				
Dulwich College Beijing	China	China & Hong Kong	Yes	Yes		Yes	Yes
Harrow International School Hong Kong	Hong Kong	China & Hong Kong	Yes	Yes	Yes	Yes	Yes
International School of Beijing	China	China & Hong Kong	Yes	Yes	Yes		Yes
Kellett School	Hong Kong	China & Hong Kong	Yes	Yes	Yes	Yes	Yes
St. Paul's Co-educational College	Hong Kong	China & Hong Kong	Yes				
Utahloy International School Guangzhou	China	China & Hong Kong	Yes				
Wellington College International Shanghai	China	China & Hong Kong	Yes			Yes	Yes
Wycombe Abbey School Changzhou	China	China & Hong Kong	Yes		Yes	Yes	Yes
The American School of Japan	Japan	South-East Asia	Yes				
Epsom College in Malaysia	Malaysia	South-East Asia	Yes				
Hwa Chong Institution	Singapore	South-East Asia	Yes				
Marlborough College Malaysia	Malaysia	South-East Asia	Yes	Yes	Yes	Yes	Yes
New International School of Thailand	Thailand	South-East Asia	Yes				Yes
North London Collegiate School Jeju	South Korea	South-East Asia	Yes		Yes	Yes	
Raffles Institution	Singapore	South-East Asia	Yes				
Shrewsbury International School	Thailand	South-East Asia	Yes	Yes	Yes		
Tanglin Trust School	Singapore	South-East Asia	Yes	Yes	Yes	Yes	Yes
United World College of South East Asia	Singapore	South-East Asia	Yes	Yes	Yes	Yes	Yes
The Alice Smith School	Malaysia	China & South East Asia		Yes	Yes	Yes	Yes
American International School of Guangzhou	China	China & South East Asia		Yes			Yes
Bangkok Patana School	Thailand	China & South East Asia		Yes	Yes	Yes	Yes
Hong Kong International School	Hong Kong	China & South East Asia		Yes	Yes	Yes	Yes
International School of Tianjin	China	China & South East Asia					Yes
St. Joseph's Institution	Singapore	China & South East Asia			Yes	Yes	Yes
Shanghai High School International Division	China	China & South East Asia					Yes
Seoul International School	South Korea	China & South East Asia		Yes			
Shenzhen College of International Education	China	China & South East Asia		Yes	Yes	Yes	Yes
Tianjin International School	China	China & South East Asia					Yes
Western Academy of Beijing	China	China & South East Asia					Yes
YK Pao School	China	China & South East Asia		Yes	Yes	Yes	
Cate School	USA	North America	Yes				
Choate Rosemary Hall	USA	North America	Yes	Yes	Yes	Yes	Yes
The College Preparatory School	USA	North America	Yes				
Deerfield Academy	USA	North America	Yes	Yes	Yes	Yes	Yes
Groton School	USA	North America	Yes		Yes	Yes	
Harvard-Westlake School	USA	North America	Yes	Yes	Yes	Yes	Yes
The Hotchkiss School	USA	North America	Yes	Yes	Yes	Yes	Yes
Lakeside School	USA	North America	Yes				
Latin School of Chicago	USA	North America	Yes				
The Lawrenceville School	USA	North America	Yes	Yes			Yes
Lick-Wilmerding High School	USA	North America	Yes				
St. Mark's School of Texas	USA	North America	Yes				
St. Paul's School	USA	North America	Yes	Yes			Yes
Philips Exeter Academy	USA	North America	Yes	Yes	Yes	Yes	Yes
Phillips Academy Andover	USA	North America	Yes	Yes	Yes	Yes	Yes
Ransom Everglades School	USA	North America	Yes				
Shawnigan Lake School	Canada	North America	Yes				
Sidwell Friends School	USA	North America	Yes	Yes	Yes	Yes	Yes
St. Stephen's Episcopal School	USA	North America	Yes				
Upper Canada College	Canada	North America	Yes	Yes		Yes	Yes
The Brearley School	USA	New York Schools	Yes	Yes	Yes	Yes	Yes
The Collegiate School	USA	New York Schools	Yes	Yes			
The Dalton School	USA	New York Schools	Yes	Yes			Yes
The Spence School	USA	New York Schools	Yes	Yes			
Trinity School	USA	New York Schools	Yes	Yes	Yes	Yes	Yes
Horace Mann School	USA	United States		Yes			Yes
American International School of Lagos	Nigeria	Africa	Yes				
Bishops Diocesan College	South Africa	Africa	Yes	Yes		Yes	Yes
The British International School, Cairo	Egypt	Africa	Yes				
Michaelhouse	South Africa	Africa	Yes	Yes	Yes	Yes	
Pembroke House School	Kenya	Africa	Yes	Yes	Yes	Yes	Yes
Geelong Grammar School	Australia	Australasia	Yes	Yes	Yes	Yes	Yes
King's College, Auckland	New Zealand	Australasia	Yes				
Pymble Ladies' College	Australia	Australasia	Yes				
St. Andrew's College, Christchurch	New Zealand	Australasia	Yes				
The King's School, Parramatta	Australia	Australasia	Yes				
St. Andrew's Scots School	Argentina	Latin America	Yes				
The Edron Academy	Mexico	Latin America	Yes				
Graded School	Brazil	Latin America	Yes				
The Grange School	Chile	Latin America	Yes				
St. Paul's School	Brazil	Latin America	Yes	Yes	Yes	Yes	Yes
Aitchison College	Pakistan	South Asia	Yes	Yes	Yes	Yes	Yes
The British School, New Delhi	India	South Asia	Yes	Yes			
The Doon School	India	South Asia	Yes	Yes	Yes	Yes	Yes
S. Thomas' College, Mount Lavinia	Sri Lanka	South Asia	Yes				
Welham Girls' School	India	South Asia	Yes				
Lakefield College School	Canada	Rest of the World		Yes	Yes	Yes	Yes
Mayo College Girls School	India	Rest of the World			Yes	Yes	
Primakov Gymnasium	Russia	Rest of the World				Yes	
Scots College	New Zealand	Rest of the World		Yes		Yes	
St. George's College	Argentina	Rest of the World		Yes	Yes	Yes	Yes
The Scots College	Australia	Rest of the World		Yes		Yes	Yes
Woodstock School	India	Rest of the World		Yes			

== Schools to Watch List ==
Schools included in the Schools to Watch List of The Schools Index
School	Country	Category	2025	2023	2022	2021	2020
Ampleforth College	UK	Ones to Watch	Yes				
Aysgarth School	UK	Ones to Watch	Yes				
Bryanston School	UK	Ones to Watch	Yes				
The Buckley School, L.A.	USA	Ones to Watch	Yes				
Dubai American Academy	UAE	Ones to Watch	Yes				
Dubai English Speaking School	UAE	Ones to Watch	Yes				
The English School, Nicosia	Cyprus	Ones to Watch	Yes				
Haileybury Almaty	Kazakhstan	Ones to Watch	Yes				
Hilton College	South Africa	Ones to Watch	Yes				
The Leys School	UK	Ones to Watch	Yes				
St. Catherine's British School, Athens	Greece	Ones to Watch	Yes				
Santa Catalina School, Monterey	USA	Ones to Watch	Yes				
Singapore American School	Singapore	Ones to Watch	Yes				
Strathallan School	UK	Ones to Watch	Yes				
Peterhouse Boys' School	Zimbabwe	Ones to Watch	Yes				
Alpha High School	USA	Something Different	Yes				
The American School in London	UK	Something Different	Yes				
Avenues São Paulo	Brazil	Something Different	Yes				
H-Farm International School, Venice	Italy	Something Different	Yes				
School of Humanity	Online	Something Different	Yes				
Bruern Abbey Senior School	UK	New Schools	Yes				
Charterhouse Lagos	Nigeria	New Schools	Yes				
Harrow School, New York	USA	New Schools	Yes				
King's College International School, Bangkok	Thailand	New Schools	Yes				
King's School The Crown, Cairo	Egypt	New Schools	Yes				
British International School, Ho Chi Minh City	Vietnam	Ones to Watch		Yes			
Deira International School	UAE	Ones to Watch		Yes			
Garden International School	Malaysia	Ones to Watch		Yes			
Haileybury	UK	Ones to Watch		Yes			
Jeddah Prep and Grammar School	Saudi Arabia	Ones to Watch		Yes			
Misk School, Riyadh	Saudi Arabia	Ones to Watch		Yes			
St. Edward's School	UK	Ones to Watch		Yes			
St. Leonard's School	UK	Ones to Watch		Yes			
The British School of Bahrain	Bahrain	Ones to Watch		Yes			
The British School of Barcelona	Spain	Ones to Watch		Yes			
Brillantmont International School	Switzerland	Small Gems		Yes		In Main List	In Main List
Milton Abbey	UK	Small Gems		Yes		In Main List	In Main List
More House School, London	UK	Small Gems		Yes			
Surval Montreux	Switzerland	Small Gems		Yes			
The National Mathematics and Science College	UK	Small Gems		Yes			
Avenues: The World School (New York)	USA	Something Different		Yes			
Bedales School	UK	Something Different		Yes			
Green School	Indonesia	Something Different		Yes			
Rochester Independent College	UK	Something Different		Yes			
Think Global School	Worldwide	Something Different		Yes			
Copperfield International School	Switzerland	New Schools		Yes			
Harrow International School Bengaluru	India	New Schools		Yes			
Maida Vale School	UK	New Schools		Yes			
Rugby School Japan	Japan	New Schools		Yes			
The Royal Grammar School Guildford, Dubai	UAE	New Schools		Yes			
