= Ramesh Rajan =

Australian neuroscientist

- Education: University of Western Australia
- Scientific career
- Fields: Neuroscience
- Workplaces: Monash University

Ramesh Rajan is an Australian neuroscientist whose work focuses on sensory neuroscience and traumatic brain injury. He is a professor at Monash University, Australia.. He is also a presenter at the Melbourne FM radio station GDR, broadcasting on 95.7 FM, where he hosts a Saturday night music program with eclectic musical choices.

== Career ==
Rajan joined the Department of Physiology at Monash University in 1987 as a research fellow, becoming a lecturer in 1995. He served as the Director of Education for the School of Biomedical Sciences from 2013 to 2016. He has received numerous teaching awards and popular student recognition for his efforts in education and has been a proponent of digital technologies in higher education. He is a board member of the Australian Data Science Education Institute. Since 2017, he has served as the national coordinator of the Australian competition of the International Brain Bee for high school students. Rajan serves on the advisory boards of the Eisdell Moore Centre and Redenlab.

== Research ==
Rajan conducts research in sensory neuroscience, especially in auditory neuroscience and speech processing, and more recently in barrel cortex and traumatic brain injury. He has authored over 100 research articles, which have attracted over 5000 citations. He served as member of the grant advisory group for Australia's National Health and Medical Research Council in 2008 and 2009 and the editorial board of the journal Audiology and Neurotology.

== Personal life ==
Rajan is a presenter on Golden Days Radio and has contributed to The Age, where he has written on education and politics. One of his PhD students was Australian rules footballer Kate Gillespie-Jones. He attended Bishop Cotton Boys' School in Bangalore, India.
