= Aloha College =

Coordinates: 36°30′38″N 4°57′22″W

- Marbella, Spain; Spain

Information
- Type: Non-profit
- Established: 1982
- Gender: Co-ed
- Age range: 3-18

Aloha College is a private school established in 1982 as a not-for-profit in Marbella, Spain. It provides an international education in 2 sections, Primary School (3 – 10 years) and Secondary School (11 – 18 years).

It has sports facilities, and the secondary school has seven science labs, two IT labs, three art studios, and a theater. In addition to a wide-ranging programme of extra-curricular activities, there is a strong emphasis on music and drama tuition. Aloha College is an official examination centre for the prestigious LAMDA qualifications (London Academy of Music and Dramatic Art). Also, examiners from the Associated Board of the Royal Schools of Music and the British Ballet Organization regularly visit the college to assess pupils. Students from 14 years onwards have the opportunity of taking part in the Duke of Edinburgh Award Scheme.

== History ==
The school was founded in 1982 by six teachers, and was funded by local and expatriate families in a not-for-profit-making project. It originally had 210 pupils.

In 2023, Forbes Spain ranked the school 5 in its annual school rankings in Spain. The Financial Times reported in 2025 that the school was particularly sought after by British expats, which had a positive impact on local property values in Nueva Andalucia, one of the largest neighborhoods in Marbella.

== Students and programs ==
In 2025, the school's website said the school had 840 students.

Students are age 3 to 18. It is co-ed without night boarding. Courses in 2024 included the UK national curriculum, the international primary curriculum, IGCSEs, the IB diploma and international A-Levels. Qualifications under the Spanish system were also provided.

== Facilities ==
The main building, purpose-built in 1982, houses the Primary school and administration department and covers an area of 5000 square metres. When it opened it was one of the first IB schools in Spain. A new Secondary school was opened in September 2004, effectively doubling the size of the school. The modern, purpose-built accommodation has, in addition to normal classroom provision, seven well-equipped laboratories, three dedicated computer suites, a library & media Centre, two art & design Studios and a Music Department with a tiered performance area and two drama studios. There are two all-weather sports pitches, a golfing academy and riding school nearby and daily use is made of tennis and swimming facilities within minutes of the site.

== See also ==
- Instituto Español Vicente Cañada Blanch - Spanish international school in London
- British migration to Spain
- The Schools Index
