= National Association of British Schools in Spain =

The National Association of British Schools in Spain (NABSS, Spanish: Asociación Nacional de Colegios Británicos en España) is an association and international accrediting body of English independent schools operating in Spain which also has an affiliation with the British Council in Spain. The Association was founded in 1978 and membership is limited to those schools accredited by the British Council, but most British schools in Spain are members.

NABSS schools offer a range of English qualifications to students, including GCSEs, AS and A Levels and offers professional development for teachers.

== List of NABSS schools ==
Member schools include:

- Almuñecar International School
- Aloha College
- The Olive Tree School
- British School of Barcelona
- British School of Tenerife
- Cambridge House Community College
- Canterbury School (Gran Canaria)
- Caxton College
- Kensington School
- Kings College, Madrid
- Lady Elizabeth School
- Queen's College
- Runnymede College
- Sage College
- Wingate School
- International School Estepona
- The British School of Málaga
