= Shenzhen College of International Education =

International school in Shenzhen, Guangdong

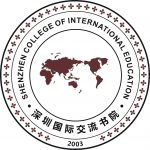

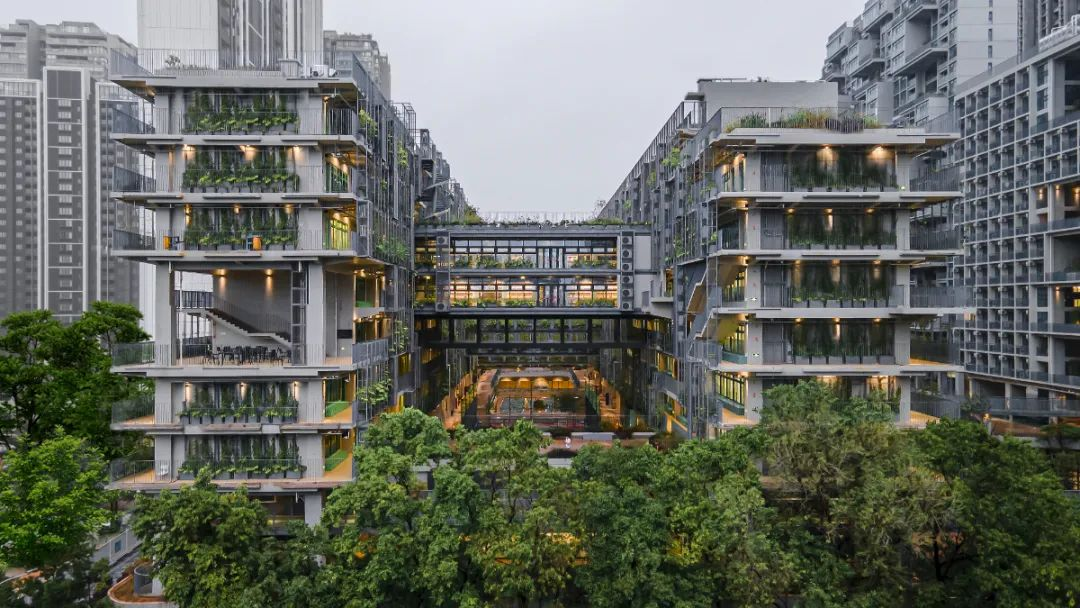

Location
- Antuoshan 6th Street, Futian District; Shenzhen, Guangdong, 518043; China
- Coordinates: 22°32′47″N 114°00′28″E

Information
- Type: Private international college
- Motto: Students in an Challenging International Environment, learning Social Responsibility, Creativity, Individuality and Enthusiasm
- Opened: August 2003
- Principal: Neil Mobsby
- Teaching staff: ~206
- Years offered: Includes G-Level and A-Level. G1, G2, A1, A2
- Age range: 15-19 (Official) 13-20 (Actual)
- Enrollment: ~1800
- Average class size: ~25
- Student to teacher ratio: 9:1
- Area: ~20000m² (site area)
- Houses: Water, Fire, Wood, Metal
- Colour: SCIE brown
- Website: alevel.com.cn scie.com.cn

Chinese name
- Simplified Chinese: 深圳国际交流书院
- Traditional Chinese: 深圳國際交流書院
- Literal meaning: Shenzhen International Exchange/Communication School
Transcriptions
Standard Mandarin
- Hanyu Pinyin: Shēnzhèn Guójì Jiāoliú Xuéyuàn
Yue: Cantonese
- Jyutping: sam1 zan3 gwok3 zai3 gaau1 lau4 syu1 jyun2

Shenzhen College of International Education (SCIE, Chinese: 深圳国际交流书院) is an international high school located in Futian, Shenzhen, China. The school offers a four-year high-school program, adopting mainly Cambridge Assessment International Education (CAIE) IGCSE and GCE A-level curriculums, and are taught mostly in English. Beginning in the academic year 2025, the school also offers a range of AP courses.

According to a 2020 ranking of Chinese international high schools, SCIE ranked first in mainland China in competitiveness in UK undergraduate applications, and tenth for US undergraduate applications.

== Foundation ==
The Shenzhen College of International Education was established in 2003 with the approval of the Shenzhen Educational Department, and it was the first full-time Chinese international college to be accredited by Cambridge Assessment International Education (CAIE).

== International examinations ==
SCIE students sit international examinations, especially IGCSE and A-Level examinations. Throughout the course of 16 years, SCIE has received 103 Top in the World awards and 162 Top in the Country awards.

== Campus ==
Before Summer 2020 the SCIE campus was at Shuiwei, a small area immediately to the north of the Huanggang Port between Shenzhen (mainland China) and Hong Kong SAR. This was commonly referred to as the Shuiwei campus (old campus).

In August 2020, the students and faculty of SCIE have moved into the new campus, which is the current campus, sitting by Antuo Hill, or alternatively, Antuoshan (安托山). The new campus was completed in mid-2020 and put into use in the following academic term. The construction site covers an area of 21,800 square meters, with a total building area of 100,000 square meters, including an 8-story academic building, a 13-story dormitory building, and a 25-story faculty apartment building.

The campus includes a student dormitory, a teacher dormitory, two teaching buildings and various facilities and sports fields.

== Language ==
Since its inception SCIE has followed a policy known as "The English Policy," which states that all academic staff and students must use English as their primary language on campus due to the international nature of the school. Because of this policy, the majority of lessons are taught in English (with the exception of physical education and Chinese language). SCIE also offers language courses in Spanish, French, and Japanese.

In a 2018 report published by British Council, SCIE students have one of the highest average IELTS score (6.9) out of all international schools in mainland China.

== Faculty ==
As of 2025, there are 206 teachers, including both Chinese and foreign teachers. With around 1,800 students, the faculty-student ratio is 1:9.

== Extracurricular academic achievements ==
SCIE students have always been active in numerous international competitions. Some of which are listed in the following:

SCIE Achievements in International Competitions
| Year | Team name | Competition | Type (subject) | Awards | Reference |
|---|---|---|---|---|---|
| 2021 | Individual | International Brain Bee (IBB) | Neuroscience/Brain science | Individual awards: National first prize: 2; National second prize: 1; National third prize: 4; As an institution: National Best Organization/Institution | |
| 2021 | SCIE | Future Business Leaders of America (FBLA) | Business | Three teams representing SCIE were awarded: National first place; National sixth place; National ninth place | |
| 2020 | GreatBay_SCIE | International Genetically Engineered Machine (IGEM) | Synthetic biology | Global high school first runner-up, Gold medal 4 special awards: Best Wiki; Best Model; Best Integrated Human Practices; Best Hardware; 4 special awards nominations: Best Poster; Best Presentation; Best New Basic Part; Best Measurement | |
| 2020 | Individual | International Brain Bee (IBB) | Neuroscience/Brain science | Individual awards: National second prize: 3; National third prize: 3; As an institution: National Best Organization/Institution | |
| 2020 | Individual | United States Academic Decathlon (USAD) | 10 different subjects | Individual awards: 1 Gold award in science; 1 Gold award in literature; 1 Gold award in social science; 1 Top score by team award; 1 Bronze award in interview; As an institution: Outstanding Achievement Award (3 Years); Holistic Education Rising Star School | |
| 2019 | GreatBay_SCIE | International Genetically Engineered Machine (IGEM) | Synthetic biology | Gold medal Special award nomination: Best Parts Collection | |
| 2019 | SCIE | Future Business Leaders of America (FBLA) | Business | Global sixth place | |
| 2018 | SIAT-SCIE | International Genetically Engineered Machine (IGEM) | Synthetic biology | Bronze medal | |
| 2018 | SIAT-SCIE | International Genetically Engineered Machine (IGEM) | Synthetic biology | Bronze medal | |
| 2016 | SCIE | Rising Star China Chemistry Challenge (RSC_{3}) | Chemistry | National first place | |

== Tuition fees ==
The annual tuition fee for the academic year 2025-2026 is 273,000 RMB for regular students and 290,000 RMB for the Music Academy (ACA) students, which includes physical examination fees, insurance fees, and fees for extracurricular activities but excludes international examination fees and field trip fees.

The accommodation fee for the academic year 2025-2026 is 16,800 RMB (excluding weekends) and 19,800 RMB (including weekends).

== See also ==
- Education in Shenzhen
