= Toni Tamarit =

Spanish footballer (born 2005)

Personal information
- Full name: Toni Tamarit Tamarit
- Date of birth: 22 November 2005 (age 20)
- Place of birth: Valencia, Spain
- Height: 1.87 m (6 ft 2 in)
- Positions: Right-back; winger

Team information
- Current team: Alverca

Youth career
- Caxton College
- Alboraya
- 2017–2019: Valencia
- Caxton College
- Alboraya

Senior career*
Years	Team	Apps	(Gls)
2024	Alboraya	2	(0)
2024–2025	Villarreal C	27	(8)
2025–2026	Villarreal B	6	(0)
2025–2026	→ Mirandés (loan)	31	(0)
2026–	Alverca	0	(0)
- * Club domestic league appearances and goals as of 9 June 2026

Toni Tamarit Tamarit (born 22 November 2005) is a Spanish footballer who plays as either a right-back or a right winger for Portuguese club FC Alverca.

== Career ==
Born in Valencia, Tamarit began his career with hometown side Caxton College, and later played for Alboraya UD before joining the youth categories of Valencia CF at the age of 11. He left after 18 months at the club, and subsequently returned to Caxton and later Alboraya.

On 22 March 2024, Tamarit agreed to a deal with Villarreal CF, effective as of July. Initially a member of the C-team in Tercera Federación, he first appeared with the reserves on 16 February 2025, starting in a 3–0 Primera Federación home win over CD Alcoyano.

On 19 May 2025, Tamarit signed a new three-year contract with the Yellow Submarine, being definitely promoted to the B-team. On 14 August, however, he was loaned to Segunda División side CD Mirandés for one year.

Tamarit made his professional debut on 17 August 2025, starting in a 1–0 away loss to Cádiz CF. The following June, he moved abroad for the first time in his career, after agreeing to a four-year deal with Primeira Liga side FC Alverca.
