= SISD =

SISD can refer to:

- Single instruction, single data, a computer processor architecture
- CCL5, an 8kDa protein also using the symbol SISD
- Sixteen-segment display
- Several school districts in Texas. See List of school districts in Texas - S
- Saginaw Intermediate School District (Michigan)
- Southeast Island School District (Alaska)
- Swiss International Scientific School in Dubai
