= Caxton College =

Location
- Puçol, Valencia, 46530; Spain
- 39.625168°N 0.30295°W

Information
- Type: Private School
- Motto: Honeste Vivere
- Established: 1987
- Age: 1 to 18
- Website: www.caxtoncollege.com/

Caxton College is a mixed private school located in Valencia (Spain) which offers complete education to students between 1 and 18 years of age, following the National Curriculum for England in a multicultural environment.

== History ==
Caxton College was founded in 1987 by the Gil-Marqués family and the current school principal is Marta Gil Marqués. Honeste Vivere is the school motto, as the school aspires for students to "live honourably" and to establish firm future social relations.

The students receive strong academic guidance and are also taught good fellowship, support for those less fortunate, good social behaviour and to question the world around them, all within a framework combining the British and Spanish cultures.

Most of the students at Caxton College are Spanish, with about 20% of the student body coming from overseas. Many of these international students live with their own families, while others board with host families.

80% of the teaching staff is British, and subjects from the English Curriculum are taught in English. The rest are Spanish, and are responsible for subjects such as Spanish, Valencian, Social Sciences and Religion.

In 2017, the school was awarded as a British School Overseas, with the highest possible mark of “Outstanding” in all areas, after a voluntary inspection carried out by Cambridge Education and NABSS (National Association of British Schools in Spain).

== See also ==
- Instituto Español Vicente Cañada Blanch - Spanish international school in London
- British migration to Spain
