= Letovo School =

Private boarding school in Moscow, Russia

Coordinates: 55.55767°N 37.4229°E

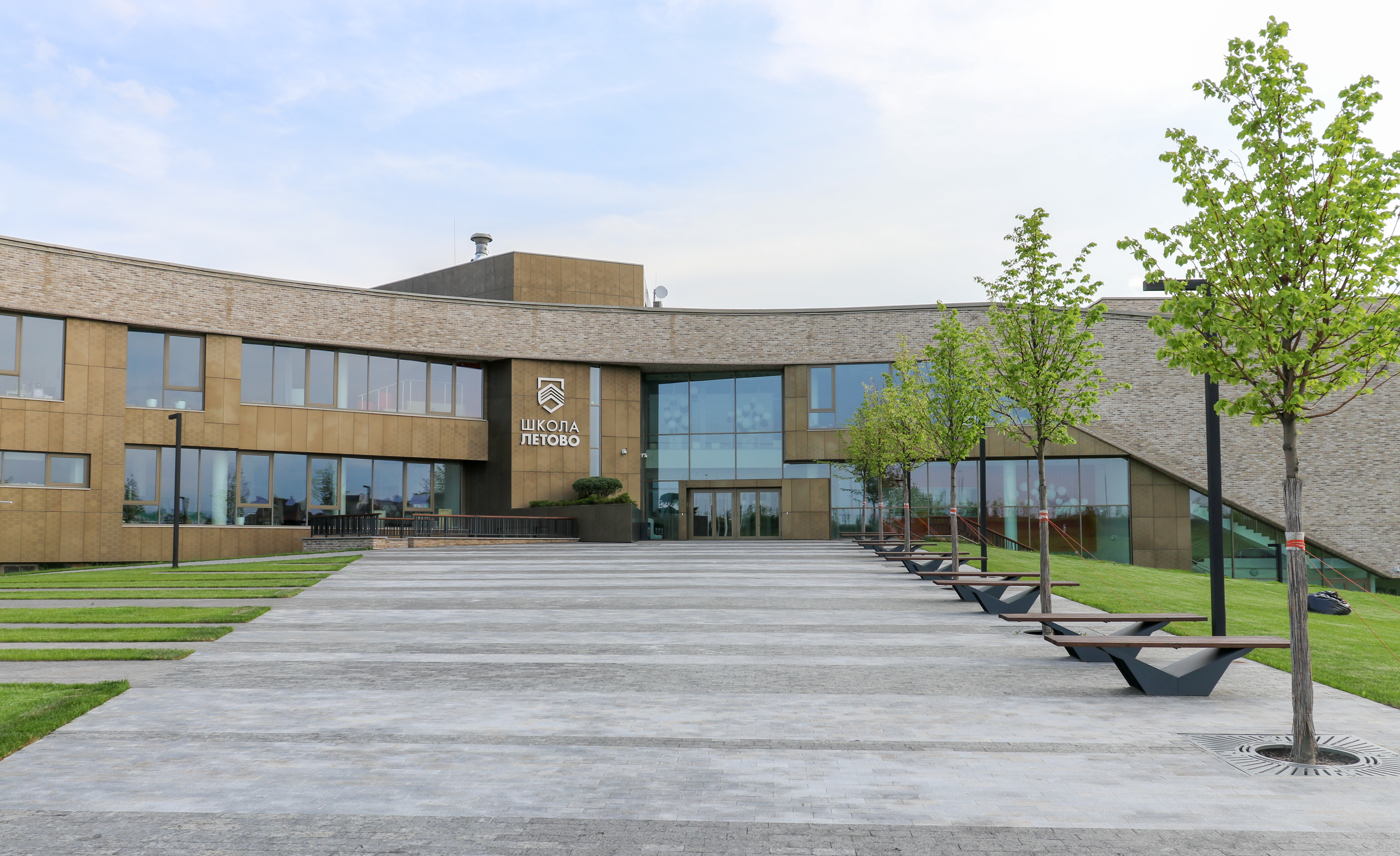
- Letovo; Russia

Information
- Type: Private
- Established: 2018
- Head of school: Mikhail Mokrinskiy
- Gender: Co-ed
- Enrollment: 750
- Campus size: 20 hectares
- Annual tuition: $20,000

Letovo School is a private non-profit co-educational boarding school in Letovo, Novomoskovskiy, Moscow, Russia. It was established in 2018 and has a total capacity of 1,000 students.

== History ==
The school was founded by Russian billionaire Vadim Moshkovich.

The founders of the School, together with McKinsey & Company, have been carrying out research and surveys in Moscow since 2006.

The school has been continuously included in each of the annual editions of The Schools Index since 2020 as one of the world's 150 leading schools and one of the top 15 in the Rest of the World category.

In 2025 Time Out listed it as one of the 15 best schools in Europe.

== Academics ==
The Letovo School concept combines the approaches of schools in the UK, Singapore, the United States, and Russia.

The school previously offered a national diploma and a certificate from the International Baccalaureate Diploma Program. Subjects offered include biology, chemistry, computer science, economics, geography, history, mathematics, physics, psychology, English literature, Russian literature, and visual arts. Languages offered include English, German, Latin, and Spanish.

Teaching at Letovo School is conducted in both Russian and English. Every student has their own individual education plan consisting of compulsory subjects and elective courses.

While the maximum tuition is $30,000, tuition averages about $20,000 a year. This can allow students from low income families to get high level education.

== Campus ==
Letovo School is placed on a 20-hectare site in the Moscow Region. It was constructed by Dutch architects Atelier PRO. The campus consists of the main school building, ten boarding houses for 500 students, three houses with apartments for teachers, a stadium, and a range of sports and recreational grounds on site. Letovo School also owns a forest allotment which will be used for ecological projects.
