= British School Muscat =

Coordinates: 23.60646°N 58.45988°E

- Muscat; Sultanate of Oman

Information
- Motto: British Education International Future
- Established: 1971
- Principal: Kevin Vacher
- Grades: Nursery to Year 13
- Enrollment: 1165
- Website: www.britishschoolmuscat.com

British School Muscat (BSM) is a not-for-profit, co-educational, British international day school in Muscat, Oman, that provides a comprehensive education to English-speaking expatriate pupils aged 3–18. The school follows an enhanced version of the English National curriculum. British School Muscat was established in 1971 when it was granted a Royal charter by Sultan Qaboos bin Said.

The school is included in The Schools Index as one of the 150 best private schools in the world and among top 15 schools in the Middle East.
