= El Poble Nou de Benitatxell / Benitachell =

El Poble Nou de Benitatxell
- Municipality
- El Poble Nou de Benitatxell / Benitachell
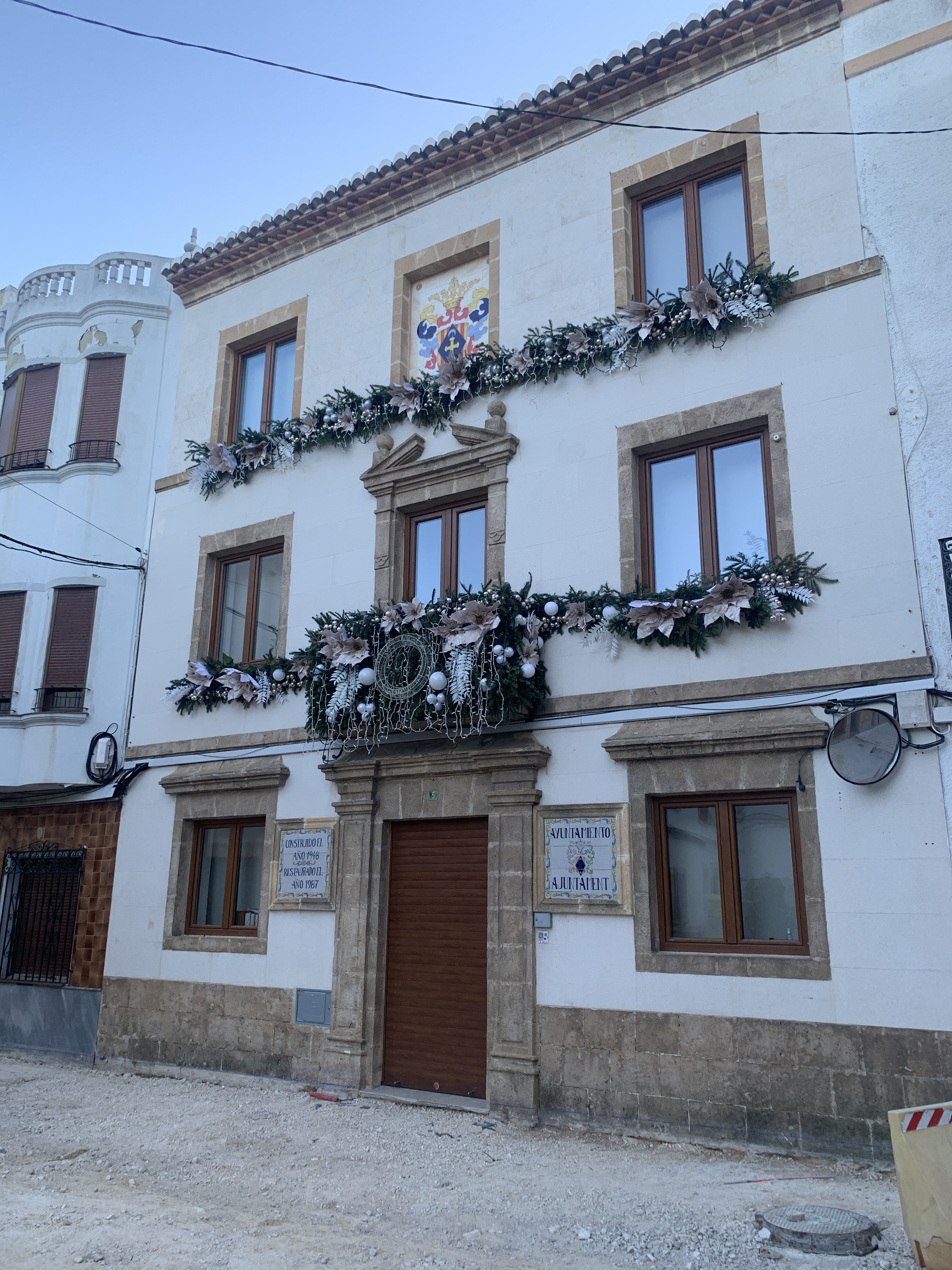
- Town hall

- Coat of arms

- Location in Spain
- Coordinates: 38°43′58″N 0°8′39″E
- Country: Spain
- Autonomous community: Valencian Community
- Province: Alacant / Alicante
- Comarca: Marina Alta
- Judicial district: Dénia

Government
  - Alcaldesa: Mª Josefa Ronda Vallés (2009) (PP)

Area
  - Total: 12.65 km^{2} (4.88 sq mi)
- Elevation: 142 m (466 ft)

Population (2008)
  - Total: 5,216
  - Density: 412.3/km^{2} (1,068/sq mi)
- Demonym(s): • pobler, -a (Val.) • poblero, -a (Sp.)
- Time zone: UTC+1 (CET)
  - Summer (DST): UTC+2 (CEST)
- Postal code: 03726
- Official language(s): Valencian · Spanish
- Website: Official website

El Poble Nou de Benitatxell (Valencian: [el ˈpɔble ˈnɔw ðe benitaˈtʃeʎ]) or Benitachell (Spanish: [benitaˈtʃel]) is a municipality in the comarca of Marina Alta in the Valencian Community, Spain.

Lady Elizabeth School, a British international school, has its junior school campus in Benitatxell.
