= The British School – Al Khubairat =

Coordinates: 24.4480774°N 54.3867874°E

The British School Al Khubairat
- Abu Dhabi; United Arab Emirates

Information
- Established: 1968
- Head teacher: Mark Leppard
- Years: Nursery to Year 13
- Enrollment: 2000 (September 2014)
- Language: English
- Campus: Urban
- Colours: Navy blue, light blue, white
- Website: britishschool.sch.ae
- Last updated: 19 March 2025

The British School Al Khubairat, formerly called "Al Khubairat Community School", now commonly known and referred to as "Al Khubairat" or "BSAK", is a non-profit fee-charging school for English speaking children in Abu Dhabi, United Arab Emirates. The school roll is some 1800 students.

== Overview ==
The school follows the National Curriculum of England and Wales, and is an international member of the Headmasters' and Headmistresses' Conference (HMC), the Independent Association of Preparatory Schools (IAPS) and the Council of British International Schools (COBIS). It has also received a rating of 'excellent' by the Independent Schools Inspectorate (ISI).

Paul Coackley was principal of the school from September 2005 until June 2013. Christopher Ray started as the headmaster in September 2013 but was replaced by Elaine Rawlings in May 2014.

In September 2015, Mark Leppard began his role of headteacher.

The school is included in The Schools Index as one of the 150 best private schools in the world and among top 15 schools in the Middle East.

== History ==
The school was established in January 1968 on land donated by the then Ruler of Abu Dhabi, Sheikh Zayed bin Sultan Al Nahyan, in an area of the city known as Khubairat. This area was the part of the Corniche where the pearl fishing fleet were first sighted on their return from sea. One suggested translation of the word 'Khubairat' is 'good news'.

In May 1971, the school was registered as a legal entity by Amiri Decree No. 5 of 1971, with its management vested in the Board of Governors. The board is made up of elected governors and those appointed by the British Ambassador to the United Arab Emirates. The school has been sponsored since 1980 by Sheikh Khalifa Bin Zayed Al Nahyan, the president of the UAE.

In 1980 the school moved into purpose built facilities at its current location on Airport Road in Al Mushrif. The facilities provided primary education for children between 3 and 11 years old. The original campus comprised an administration block, four teaching blocks and two sports halls. It also included a 25m swimming pool, around which were constructed staff quarters that accommodated the school's teachers.

Towards the end of the 1990s it became apparent that there was a need in Abu Dhabi for the provision of secondary education. Increasingly, Abu Dhabi was no longer a posting of two to three years for most British expatriates, with more families staying here for five to ten years. As The British School was the centre for educational provision within the British expatriate society in Abu Dhabi, the Board of Governors approved the construction of a secondary school alongside the original primary buildings on the existing site. This was phase 1 of The British School development programme.

Whilst phase 1 was under construction, the board proceeded with the construction of phase 2, a three-storey building for the primary school. Construction commenced in April 2001 and the Jubilee Building (years 3–6) was formally opened by Sheikh Nayhan Bin Mubarak Al Nahyan in April 2002.

As the construction of phase 2 was drawing to a close, the new secondary school was proving to be a success with full classes progressing into years 7, 8 and 9. It became apparent that many families in Abu Dhabi wished to see their children continue their education at the British School into the sixth form so they could sit their A Levels in Abu Dhabi. The first A Level students completed their studies in June 2005.

A third phase of development was started in October 2002. The building includes a theatre, auditorium, library, sixth form accommodation, an additional gymnasium, drama studio, music centre and a range of academic and administrative facilities. The building was opened in September 2005. The school now holds approximately 1,800 students.

In 2012, the school opened phase IV of its development. The Ruby Building is a new primary block for the youngest children, from nursery to year 2, as well as being home to several facilities such as: Junior School library, the instrumental department, two indoor pools, Junior School sports halls, a drama/dance studio, the Science garden, the food technology room and the Junior School Science laboratory, in addition to classroom facilities.

In February 2022, construction began on a new Science and Innovation Centre, located on the Secondary grounds of the campus. This building included new and improved classrooms, facilities and labs. Construction on the building finished in January 2023 with the new block opening during the next month, due to compliance approvals. A month later, there was development in the secondary gymnasium which saw the introduction of a new fitness suite, better facilities, such as retractable cricket nets and basketball hooping facilities.
