= Deutsche Neurowissenschaften-Olympiade =

The Deutsche Neurowissenschaften-Olympiade (DNO or German Neuroscience Olympiad) is a series of competitions for students in grades 8 to 13, aimed at promoting interest in neuroscience. The competition takes place at two levels: city and national. Each competition is in question and answer format and conducted in English. The winner of the national German Neuroscience Olympiad will represent Germany at the International Brain Bee competition.

== History ==
The "Deutsche Neurowissenschaften-Olympiad" is part of the International Brain Bee program which oversees more than 150 competitions in over 45 countries each year. The program was founded in 1999 by Dr. Norbert Myslinski in the United States. The program has since expanded beyond the United States.

Dr. Julianne McCall established the "German Brain Bee" competition in 2011, the first of its kind in Germany. The German Brain Bee takes place in Heidelberg and includes over 100 high schools across Germany.

In 2015, "The German Brain Bee" was renamed the Deutsche Neurowissenschaften-Olympiad and is organized by the Deutsche Neurowissenschaften-Olympiad Association.

In 2016, the board of the DNO began the process of expanding the competition throughout Germany.

== Mission ==
The motto of DNO is "Driving Connectivity", the organization's mission is to motivate and inspire young people to learn about the human brain, foster interest in the various fields of neurosciences and pursuit of careers in basic neuroscience research. Through local and national competitions, summer research schools, practical courses, and other outreach programs DNO would like to encourage national and international exchange among students on their way towards a scientific career. The philosophy of DNO is that through encouraging young students to work together to face new and exciting challenges in neuroscience research, there can be a further understanding of brain functions.

== Competition ==
The competition, which until 2016 has only taken place in Heidelberg, is open to students in grades 8 to 13 with the total number of participants limited to 60 students per city. Currently, the German Neuroscience Olympiad is expanding into other cities throughout Germany. In addition to Heidelberg, since 2017, there has been local student competitions in Berlin, Bonn, and Frankfurt. Therefore, 180 students are anticipated to participate in the local Neuroscience Olympiads in 2020.

The top 15 students from each local competition will be invited to the finals, the location of which is rotated each year. The DNO provides travel allowances for a student traveling long distances to participate in each consecutive level of the Olympiad. The competition is divided into 4 parts: podium section, where a jury of three professors will ask questions; a short written exam section; a neuroanatomy section with plastic brain models in addition to microscopy slides with real human brain samples; and a patient diagnosis section with patient videos and mock medical history data. The competition is held in English but a jury can assist in German, if necessary.

== Awards ==
The winner of the German Neuroscience Olympiad finals competition receives a trophy and the opportunity to represent Germany at the International Brain Bee, for which flights and accommodation are paid for each winner and a chaperone. The 2nd and 3rd-place winners are also awarded smaller prizes. In the future, DNO aims to provide the top 3 students of each local German Neuroscience Olympiad competition with a chance to do a summer internship in a neuroscience research lab, to allow students to see what the day-to-day research is like.

== List of International Brain Bee venues and associated conferences ==
- 2009 Toronto, Canada – The American Psychological Association
- 2010 San Diego, United States – The American Psychological Association
- 2011 Florence, Italy – The International Brain Research Organization
- 2012 Cape Town, South Africa – The World Congress of Psychology
- 2013 Vienna, Austria – World Congress of Neurology
- 2014 Washington, DC, United States – American Psychological Association Convention
- 2015 Cairns, Australia – International Soc. for Neurochemistry, Asian Pacific Soc. for Neurochemistry and Australasian Neuroscience Soc. Biennial Meeting
- 2016 Denmark, Copenhagen, - Federation of European Neuroscience Societies Congress
- 2017 Washington, DC, United States – DCAPA Annual Convention
- 2018 Berlin, Germany – 11th FENS Forum of Neuroscience
- 2019 Daegu, South Korea – IBRO World Congress of Neuroscience
- 2020 Washington, DC, United States – American Psychological Association Convention (cancelled)
