= Repton School Dubai =

Location
- Dubai, 299331; United Arab Emirates; 25.1453°N 55.3790°E

Information
- Type: Independent school
- Motto: Porta Vacat Culpa (The gate is free from blame)
- Established: 2007; 19 years ago
- Lord of Head: David Cook
- Gender: Co-educational
- Age: 3 to 18
- Enrolment: 1900 (September 2021)
- School fees: AED 55,800-100,000
- Website: reptondubai.org

Repton School Dubai, part of Cognita, is an international, co-educational school founded in 2007. The school caters to students from ages 3 to 18 and has boarding facilities for students from age 11. It is a partner school of the original Repton School in the United Kingdom, founded in 1557.

Repton School Dubai was the first sister school of the UK-based renowned Repton institution within the UAE educational landscape. Repton School Dubai was also the first UK branded international school to start its operations in the UAE. Subsequently, Repton School Abu Dhabi and Repton School Al Barsha were launched in the UAE in 2013.

According to KHDA (Knowledge and Human Development Authority) inspections, Repton has maintained an outstanding rating since the 2014-2015 academic year.

The school is included in The Schools Index as one of the 150 best private schools in the world and among top 15 schools in the Middle East.

The school is one of the most expensive in Dubai, with fees up to AED 100,000 ($27,225). It is one of only two schools in the emirate to offer boarding.

The Junior and Senior schools are located on a campus of 1.3 million square feet in Nad Al Sheba 3, making it among the larger schools in the region. Year 13 Graduation events are held in the Dubai Opera annually.

== Academics ==
Repton School Dubai offers a full range of the IGCSE curriculum and the IB Diploma, IB Career Programme, and A-Level courses with a choice of 45 subjects in various academic fields. In 2024, 17% of the Year 13 cohort achieved A* to A grades. The school houses students from over 80 different nationalities. Students of the school have gone on to attend Harvard University, Oxford University, Stanford University and more.

== Charity Work ==
In 2019, the school partnered with Dubai Cares and raised AED 142,000 ($38,660) to build a school in Senegal.

== Notable alumni ==
- Chirag Suri - Cricketer
