= Doha College =

Location
- AL Wajba; Doha; Qatar
- 25°18′11″N 51°24′14″E

Information
- Type: Independent school
- Motto: Excellence for All, Excellence from All
- Established: 1980; 46 years ago
- Principal: Mr David Tongue
- Grades: Early Years (FS1, FS2) to Year 13 (sixth form)
- Enrollment: 2000+
- Average class size: 24
- Hours in school day: 6 hours 45 mins (7:10 - 1:55) (5 hours in Ramadan. 9:00 - 2:00)
- Houses: Viper; Scorpion; Trident; Eagle; Oryx
- Colours: White (Sixth Form) and Blue (KS4 and under)
- Publication: Majlis (English)
- Feeder schools: Doha College Al Wajba
- Website: www.dohacollege.com

Doha College is a coeducational British international independent school located in Doha, Qatar. Established in 1980, the school was founded to meet the growing demand for a British-style education in Qatar. Doha College operates as a not-for-profit organisation and provides education for pupils aged 3 to 18 through the British curriculum, from Early Years to A Levels.

The school serves more than 2,800 pupils representing over 90 nationalities and is one of the largest British international schools in Qatar.

Doha College is academically selective for admission and progression between certain key stages. The school has received accreditation from the Council of British International Schools (COBIS) and has been recognised internationally for its academic performance and educational standards.

The school is included in The Schools Index as one of the world's leading private schools and has been recognised among the top schools in the Middle East.

== History ==
The school opened in April 1980 to meet the demand for a British curriculum in the country and is one of the oldest schools teaching the British curriculum in the region.
