= Kate Gillespie-Jones =

Australian rules footballer

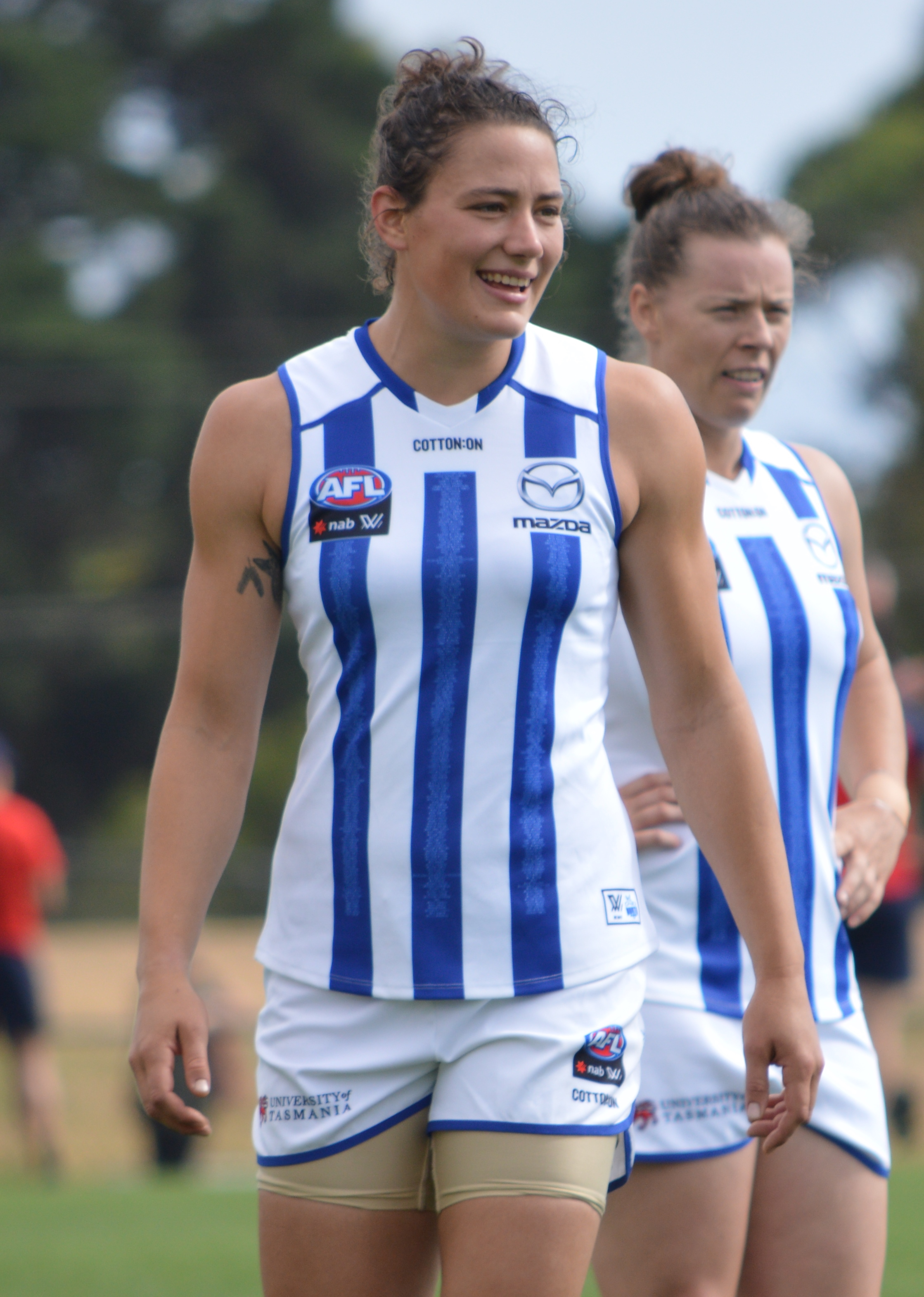
- Gillespie-Jones with North Melbourne in January 2019

Personal information
- Full name: Katherine Gillespie Jones
- Born: 26 April 1991 (age 35)
- Original team: Seaford (VFL Women's)
- Draft: No. 14, 2016 AFL Women's draft
- Debut: Round 1, 2017, Carlton vs. Collingwood, at Ikon Park
- Height: 179 cm (5 ft 10 in)
- Position: Utility

Playing career^{1}
| Years | Club | Games (Goals) |
| 2017–2018 | Carlton | 13 (0) |
| 2019–2021 | North Melbourne | 24 (5) |
| Total | | 37 (5) |
- ^{1} Playing statistics correct to the end of the 2021 season.

Katherine Gillespie-Jones (born 26 April 1991) is an Australian rules footballer who played with Carlton and North Melbourne in the AFL Women's (AFLW).

== AFLW career ==
Doctor Gillespie-Jones was drafted by Carlton with the club's second selection and the fourteenth overall in the 2016 AFL Women's draft. She made her debut in round 1, 2017, in the club and the league's inaugural match at Ikon Park against Collingwood. In May 2018, Gillespie-Jones signed with expansion club, North Melbourne, to play with the club in the 2019 AFLW season. It was revealed that Gillespie-Jones was likely to explore the option of a trade in the wake of the 2021 AFL Women's season. After not finding a new home, North Melbourne delisted her at the end of the trade period.

== Personal life ==
Gillespie-Jones completed a PhD at Monash University in 2019 under the supervision of Ramesh Rajan, with a focus on researching a new drug treatment for traumatic brain injuries.
