= Canterbury School (Gran Canaria) =

Private school in the Canary Islands, Spain

Coordinates: 28.0852°N 15.4678°W

- Las Palmas de Gran Canaria, Canary Islands; Spain

Information
- Type: Private day school
- Established: 1972; 54 years ago
- Headteachers: Beryl Pritchard (secondary); Pedro Tomas (secondary); Lindsay Gale (primary); Pamela Ainsworth (infant); Paula Hill (south)
- Enrolment: 2000+
- Campus: Suburban
- Colours: Green, Blue and White
- Website: canterburyschool.com

The Canterbury School is a private coeducational bilingual day school founded in 1972 by owner and headteacher Beryl Pritchard.

The main school campus is located 4 km outside Las Palmas de Gran Canaria, in purposely designed buildings which house the Primary, Secondary and administrative departments. The Infant school and nursery is located in the city of Las Palmas and a newer, although smaller, second Primary school is located near to Maspalomas in the south of the island.

The school is authorised by both the British Council, NABSS, and local Spanish educational authorities to deliver an English-style education on the island. All students at the school follow the National Curriculum for England which is adapted, where appropriate, to suit the geographical location. The school is bilingual; using Spanish and English as working languages. Santi Aldama, actual player of Memphis Grizzlies in the NBA, was formed in Canterbury School.
