= British School of Barcelona =

The British School of Barcelona

Location
- Sitges & Castelldefels (Barcelona, Catalonia); Spain
- Coordinates: 41.272155°N 1.989335°E

Information
- Type: Private, day school
- Established: 1958
- Enrolment: Nearly 2000 students across all campuses
- Campus: Non-residential, Suburban
- Colours: Navy Blue, Red, Grey and White
- Website: www.britishschoolbarcelona.com

The British School of Barcelona (BSB) is a private coeducational bilingual international school located in the Barcelona metropolitan area, Catalonia, Spain.

It operates as an all-through English International school, catering to students aged 2–18, and maintains four campuses located in Barcelona, Castelldefels, and Sitges. The school has already announced the construction of a new campus in Cabrera de Mar, in the Maresme region.

The school holds formal recognition and accreditation from the British government for its adherence to the English National Curriculum. Additionally, it is accredited by the International Baccalaureate Organization to offer the International Baccalaureate (IB) Diploma Programme (DP). Furthermore, the school is authorised to validate the Spanish ESO and Bachillerato (Secondary and Sixth Form) programmes by both the Spanish Ministry of Education and the Catalan Department of Education.

Since 2007, The British School of Barcelona has been affiliated with Cognita, a global educational group.

The school holds the status of a founding member within the National Association of British Schools in Spain (NABSS).

== History ==
Founded in 1958 as the Anglo-American School, the institution saw significant growth following the 1978 publication of the first Royal Decree recognising foreign schools in Spain, which validated studies for Spanish pupils. This recognition played a pivotal role in attracting local families seeking British education and English language proficiency.

In 1999, The British School of Barcelona was established. In 2007, ownership was transferred to the Cognita Schools Group. In January 2016, Cognita Group acquired the International School of Barcelona in Sitges, which was subsequently integrated as a new campus under the brand of The British School of Barcelona in September 2016.

April 2018 marked the inauguration of BSB Nexus, the new Pre-University campus in Castelldefels. In September 2019, the school expanded its sports facilities with a new 9,000 square meters rugby and football stadium adjacent to the BSB Castelldefels campus.

In 2021, BSB opened the BSB City Esperança Campus for Early Years and Year 1 (3–6 years) in Barcelona (Sarrià-Sant Gervasi), becoming the fourth campus. Additionally, in October 2021, BSB launched a BSB Science, Technology, Engineering, and Mathematics (STEM) Centre in Castelldefels, opposite the BSB Nexus campus, expanding existing lab space.

In September 2023, BSB opened the BSB City Lucà Campus, also in Sarrià-Sant Gervasi, extending its educational offerings to students up to 18 years of age in Barcelona.

In September 2026, the school will open BSB Maresme, a new campus in Cabrera de Mar, in the Maresme region, for students aged 3 to 18. It will be opened in September 2026 for Early Years and Primary pupils (3-11 years old), expanding to Secondary in September 2027.

== Facilities ==
The school operates campuses located in Barcelona, Castelldefels, and Sitges, catering to children from the city and its environs.

- BSB Sitges: Offering education from Pre-Nursery to Year 6 (2–11 years old).
- BSB Castelldefels: Providing educational programmes from Nursery to Year 11 (3–16 years old).
- BSB Nexus, in Castelldefels: Serving as a Pre-University campus for students in Years 12 and 13 (16–18 years old).
- BSB City, in Barcelona: Offering education from Nursery to Pre-University (3–18 years old).
- BSB Maresme, in Cabrera de Mar. Opening in September 2026. Education from Nursery to Pre-University (3–18 years old).
Campuses

== School organisation and studies ==
The British School of Barcelona provides education to children starting from Pre-Nursery school age (2 years old, at BSB Sitges) and Nursery school age (3 years old, at BSB Castelldefels and BSB City), extending up to university entrance (18 years old).

The curriculum at the school primarily adheres to the National Curriculum of England and Wales. Students progress to preparing for GCSE examinations, and upon entering Pre-University education, they have the option to pursue either Advanced Level examinations (A Levels) or the International Baccalaureate (IB Diploma Programme). Both programmes encompass a core curriculum of subjects.

The Pre-University curriculum is designed to meet the requirements set forth by the Spanish and Catalan Governments, enabling students to fulfil the criteria necessary to attain Spanish qualifications (ESO and Bachillerato).

Furthermore, the school provides preparation for students to take the Spanish University Access exams (PCE or Pruebas de Competencias Específicas) required for admission to Spanish universities. These exams are administered by the UNED (Universidad Nacional de Educación a Distancia).

== Host of Festival of Education in Spain ==
The British School of Barcelona Castelldefels Campus will host the inaugural Spain Festival of Education on 13 June 2026. The Spain Festival of Education is a professional learning event that brings together an exceptional line up of voices from education, wellbeing, leadership and innovation, with 40+ sessions delivered by 50 expert speakers. This is part of the global expansion of the well-established Festival of Education run by Wellington College in the UK since 2010.
