= Swiss International Scientific School in Dubai =

Private school in Dubai, the United Arab Emirates

Location
- 25.20943°N 55.33269°E

Information
- Established: 2012
- Language: English and either French or German, depending on pathway
- Website: https://www.nordangliaeducation.com/sisd-dubai

Swiss International Scientific School, or SISD, is an international school situated in Dubai Healthcare City, Phase 2, Al Jaddaf, Dubai.

The school hosts ~3,000 students across over 100 nationalities, and offers a multilingual curriculum in the form of the International Baccalaureate programme for Pre-KG to Grade 12. It includes boarding houses that cater to ages 11–17, offering full-time, weekly, and flexi-boarding options.

The school is included in The Schools Index as one of the 150 best private schools in the world and among top 15 schools in the Middle East.

== History ==
SISD was founded by Omar Danial, co-owner of Swiss hotel group Manotel and President and major shareholder of investment company Finial Capital SA. Danial had moved to Dubai in 2010 with his family, and originally intended to found a school for the hospitality industry.

However, upon arrival, Danial found that the overall educational presence of the International Baccalaureate programme in the area was lacking. As many European expatriates were starting to arrive and work in the region, he consulted contacts in the Swiss education field for advice in how to create an educational institution based on the Swiss educational system.

Danial founded the school in 2012 through personal investments, a local bank, and the backing of the prominent Seddiqi family, who are among the co-founders of the school.

== Curriculum ==
SISD implements the International Baccalaureate curriculum in the form of the IB Primary Years Programme, IB Middle Years Programme, IB Diploma Programme, and Career-related Programme.

SISD is Dubai's first private school to offer multilingual education in French, English, German and Arabic. The school offers three different study streams: English+ with additional languages (Arabic and French or German) and personalised STEAM programme from Pre-KG to Grade 5; bilingual English-French; and English-German.

In the 2018 school year, SISD began a trial implementation of Common Sense Media's Digital Citizenship curriculum, aiming to better equip students for life in an increasingly digital world.

In the 2020 school year, SISD enhanced the Early Years and Primary School English+ programme by integrating transdisciplinary Science, Technology, Engineering, Arts and Mathematics education into the curriculum. The enhanced programme conforms to the IB curriculum, while including STEAM lessons which conform to technology education standards such as the Next Generation Science Standards, International Standards for Technology Education and UNESCO Education for Sustainable Development.

In June 2020, SISD was authorised to offer the International Baccalaureate Career-related Programme (IBCP). It is designed for students aged 16-19 who wish to engage in career-related education.

== Facilities ==
SISD features several facilities that are open to students and boarding house occupants, both during school and after school hours.

The Innovation Labs support STEM education and contain equipment for programming, robotics, app development, 3D printing, and design. There are also music and dance studios, as well as art and design rooms.

The school also provides access to sports facilities such as tennis and basketball courts, an Olympic swimming pool, soccer fields, and a gym.
