= Predicted impact of Brexit =

Predicted long-term effects of Brexit

This article outlines the predicted impact of Brexit, the withdrawal of the United Kingdom (UK) from the European Union (EU) and the European Atomic Energy Community (EAEC or Euratom).

Experts predicted different effects depending on the negotiated withdrawal agreement and the EU–UK Trade and Cooperation Agreement or whether the transition period had ended before an agreement was ratified (a "no-deal" Brexit).

The effects of Brexit can impact entities inside the UK and have an impact on Gibraltar, an impact on the European Union and impact on third world countries. The land border between Northern Ireland and the Republic of Ireland is predicted to be affected by Brexit, being addressed with Northern Ireland protocol.

== Academia ==
According to a 2016 study by Ken Mayhew, Emeritus Professor of Education and Economic Performance at Oxford University, Brexit posed the following threats to higher education: "loss of research funding from EU sources; loss of students from other EU member states; the impact on the ability of the sector to hire academic staff from EU member states; and the impact on the ability of UK students to study abroad." The UK received more from the European agencies and institutions for research than it financially contributed with universities getting just over 10% of their research income from the European agencies and institutions. All funding for net beneficiaries from European agencies and institutions, including universities, was guaranteed by the British government in August 2016. Before the funding announcement, a newspaper investigation reported that some research projects were reluctant to include British researchers due to uncertainties over funding. Currently the UK is part of the European Research Area and the UK is likely to wish to remain an associated member.

Meanwhile, by 2021, the UK's Turing Scheme doubled the number of entrants compared to the similar EU ‘Erasmus’ scheme.

== Local and geographic effects ==
=== Border between the UK and Ireland ===
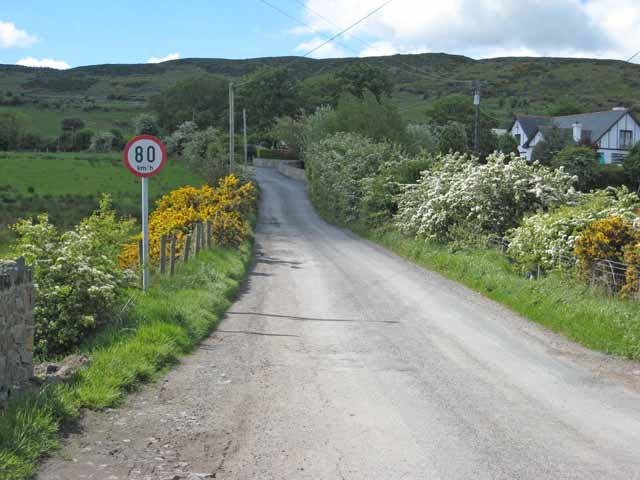
The UK–Ireland border crosses this road at Killeen (near Newry), marked only by a speed limit in km/h. (Northern Ireland uses mph.)

The United Kingdom and Republic of Ireland have been part of the Common Travel Area since before the EU was formed. This allows their citizens freedom of movement within the area. Their membership of the EU Customs Union and Single Market means there are no customs checks or tariffs. Since 2005, the border has been essentially invisible.

After Brexit, the border between Northern Ireland (part of the UK) and the Republic of Ireland (part of the EU) became the only UK–EU land border. There was concern over this becoming a "hard border" with fewer, controlled crossing points and customs checks. This could have compromised the Good Friday Agreement that ended the Northern Ireland conflict, and lead to violence. All involved parties agreed a hard border should be avoided. To forestall this, the EU proposed a "backstop agreement" that would have kept the UK in the Customs Union and kept Northern Ireland in some aspects of the Single Market also, until a lasting solution was found. The backstop was supported by the Irish government and many Irish nationalists, but opposed by the Democratic Unionist Party as weakening Northern Ireland's place within the United Kingdom and is regarded as the main reason why Theresa May's withdrawal agreement was never approved by the British Parliament. The UK Parliament had already rejected an earlier proposal.

After becoming Prime Minister on 24 July 2019, Boris Johnson promised to remove the backstop from the withdrawal agreement and replace it with "alternative arrangements". After further negotiations in autumn of 2019, an alternative model, the Ireland/Northern Ireland Protocol of the final Brexit withdrawal agreement was agreed between the UK and the EU.

If there were a no-deal Brexit, the UK government announced that it would not have performed customs checks at the Irish border and acknowledged that might have presented a smuggling risk. European Commission President, Jean-Claude Juncker, said if there was a no-deal Brexit the Republic of Ireland would have had to implement border checks on the EU's behalf. In 2019, the President of Ireland signed into law the Withdrawal of the United Kingdom from the European Union (Consequential Provisions) Act, to help deal with challenges a no-deal Brexit posed to the Republic and its citizens.

According to data published by Ireland's Central Statistics Office goods exports from Great Britain to Ireland have dropped by 20% since the United Kingdom left the single market. Meanwhile, exports to Great Britain increased by 20% in the same period.

=== Gibraltar ===
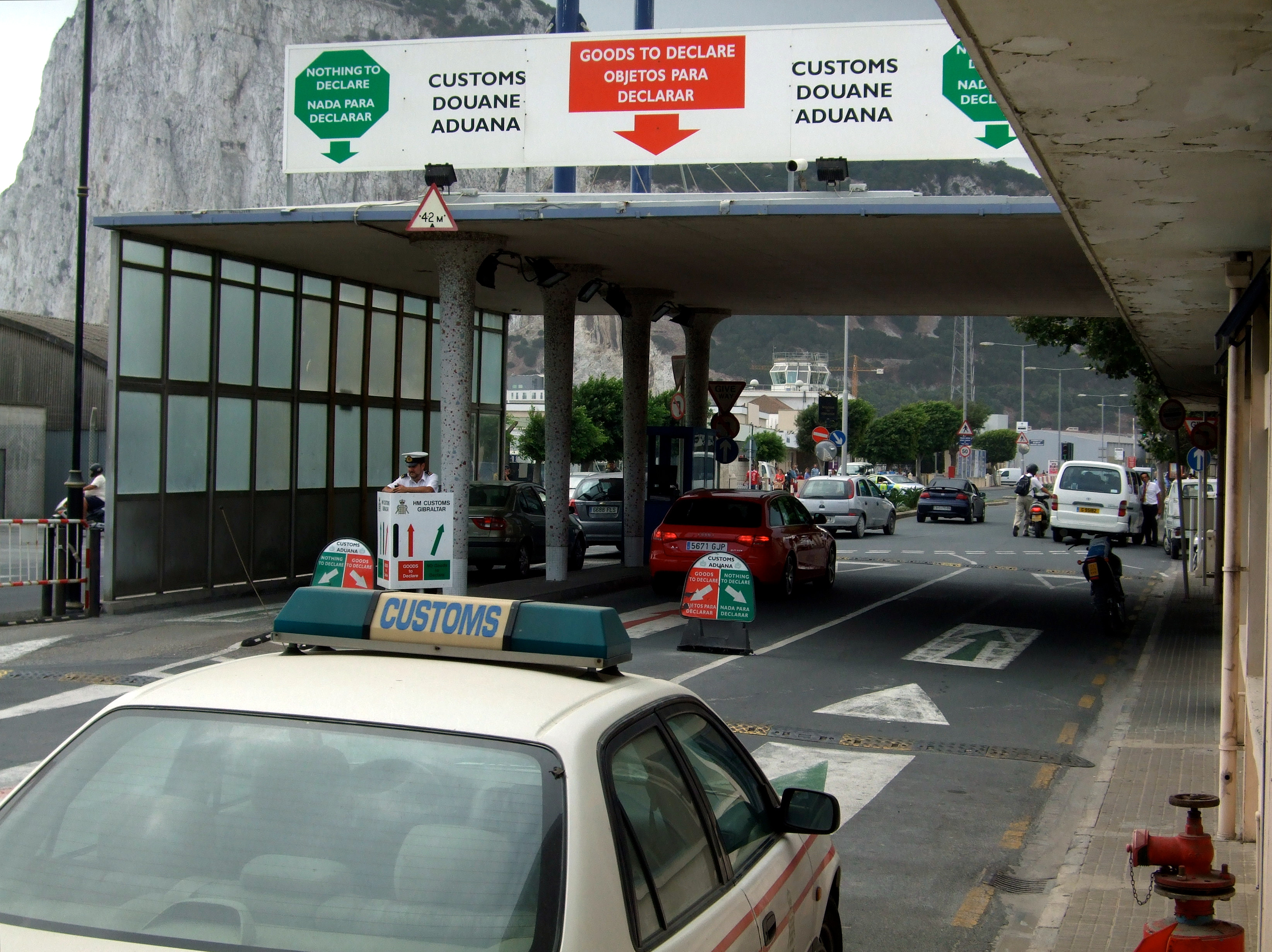
Cars crossing into Gibraltar clearing customs formalities. Gibraltar is outside the customs union, VAT area, and Schengen Zone.

Gibraltar, a British Overseas Territory, participated in the referendum and left the EU together with the UK, although 96% of those who participated in the referendum in Gibraltar voted to remain. Gibraltar is outside the EU Customs Union and Schengen Zone, meaning it has customs and identity checks at its border with Spain.

Spain asserts a territorial claim on Gibraltar. After the referendum, Spain's Foreign Minister renewed calls for joint Spanish–British control. This was rebuffed by Gibraltar's Chief Minister, and the UK government states it would only negotiate on Gibraltar's sovereignty with the consent of its people.

The European Council's guidelines for withdrawal negotiations stated that UK–EU agreements made after Brexit would not apply to Gibraltar without Spain's consent. Gibraltarian government minister (and former Chief Minister) Joe Bossano condemned the EU's attitude, suggesting that Spain was being offered a veto, adding "It's enough to convert me from a supporter of the European Union into a Brexiteer".

In late 2018, the British and Spanish governments agreed that any dispute over Gibraltar would not affect Brexit negotiations, and the British government agreed that UK–EU treaties made after Brexit would not automatically apply to Gibraltar. Spanish Prime Minister Pedro Sánchez said that "With Brexit we all lose, especially the United Kingdom, but when it comes to Gibraltar, Spain wins."

=== Scotland ===
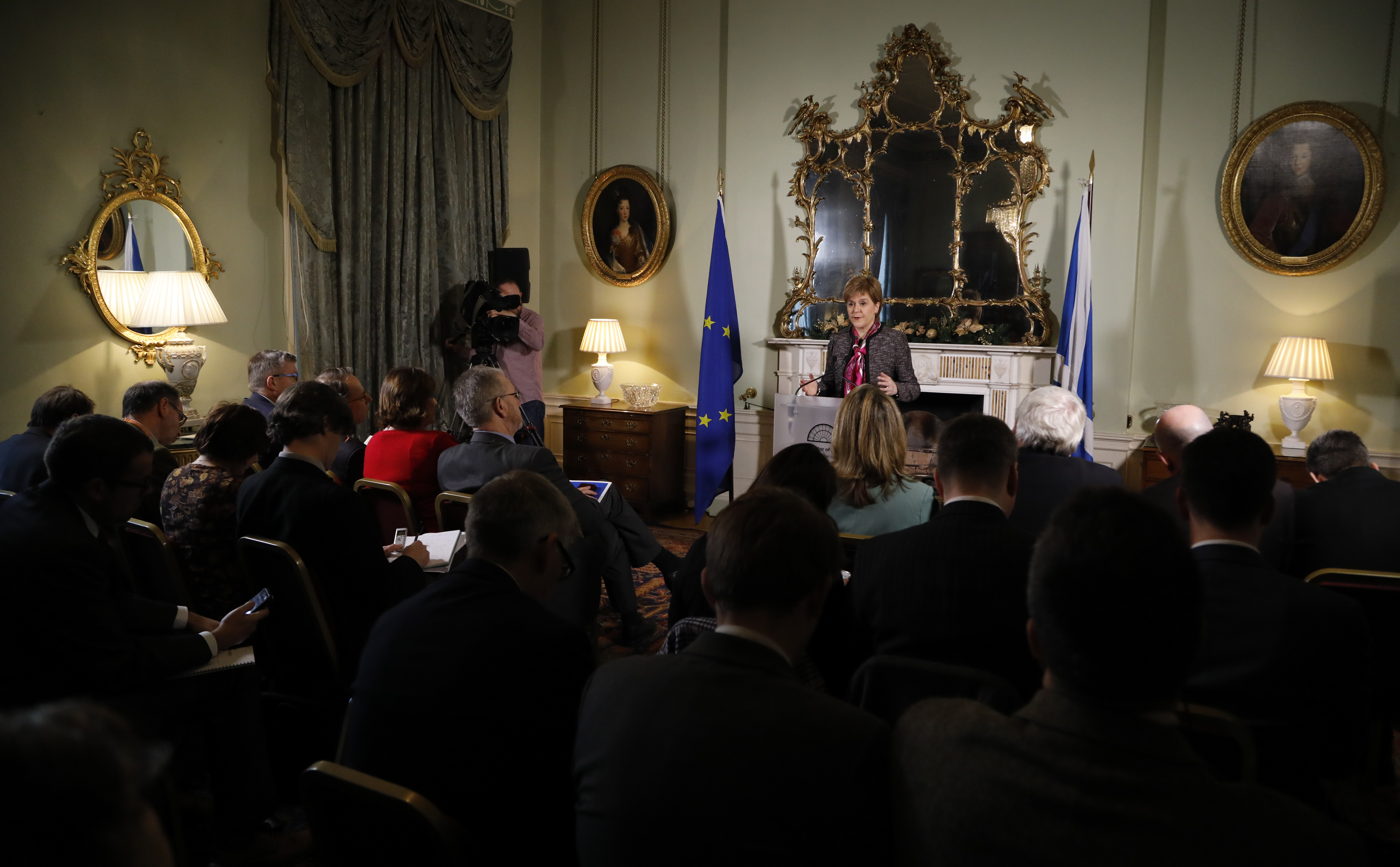
First Minister of Scotland Nicola Sturgeon addresses journalists over Brexit and Scotland's place within Europe at Bute House.

After the Brexit referendum, the Scottish Government – led by the Scottish National Party (SNP) – planned another independence referendum because Scotland voted to remain in the EU while England and Wales voted to leave. It had suggested this before the Brexit referendum. The First Minister of Scotland, Nicola Sturgeon, requested a referendum be held before the UK's withdrawal, but the British Prime Minister rejected this timing, but not the referendum itself. At the referendum in 2014, 55% of voters had decided to remain in the UK, but the referendum on Britain's withdrawal from the EU was held in 2016, with 62% of Scottish voters against it. In March 2017, the Scottish Parliament voted in favour of holding another independence referendum. Sturgeon called for a "phased return" of an independent Scotland back to the EU. In 2017, if Northern Ireland remained associated with the EU – for example, by remaining in the Customs Union, some analysts argued Scotland would also insist on special treatment. However, in the event, the only part of the United Kingdom which received unique treatment was Northern Ireland.

On 21 March 2018, the Scottish Parliament passed the Scottish Continuity Bill. This was passed due to stalling negotiations between the Scottish Government and the British Government on where powers within devolved policy areas should lie after Brexit. The Act allowed for all devolved policy areas to remain within the remit of the Scottish Parliament and reduces the executive power upon exit day that the UK Withdrawal Bill provides for Ministers of the Crown. The bill was referred to the UK Supreme Court, which found that it could not come into force as the European Union (Withdrawal) Act 2018, which received royal assent between the Scottish Parliament passing its bill and the Supreme Court's judgement, designated itself under schedule 4 of the Scotland Act 1998 as unamendable by the Scottish Parliament. The bill therefore did not receive royal assent.

=== Border with France ===
The French and British governments stated they remained committed to the Le Touquet Agreement, which lets UK border checks be completed in France, and vice versa (juxtaposed controls). The two governments signed the Sandhurst Treaty in January 2018, which will shorten the time taken to process migrants attempting to reach the UK from Calais, from six months to one month. The UK also announced it will invest a further £44.5 million on border security at the English Channel.

If there had been a "no-deal" Brexit, trade between the UK and France would have defaulted to World Trade Organization rules. To ensure the smooth flow of freight, France created a new "smart border" which will scan trucks' licence plates and automatically link them to shipping documents filled out online by exporters. Trucks travelling to Britain will either be waved through, or undergo checks if they carry food, plants or livestock. Gérald Darmanin, French Minister of Public Action and Accounts, said there would not be long queues in Calais. France is spending €50 million on expanding port infrastructure and plans to recruit 700 more customs staff by the end of 2020.

In the first holidays after Brexit and the COVID Crisis delays occurred in Dover port. With Brexit rules, all passport need to be checked. The French Government states that France is not responsible for Brexit queue at the border, while Port of Dover boss Doug Bannister has told LBC that it's "absolutely true" that Brexit is ultimately to blame for the extreme delays at the port of Dover because passports require extra checks.

=== Customs between the EU and UK ===
In mid-2020, the UK announced plans to spend £705m to shore up UK borders in light of Brexit. This includes £235m for new staffing and IT systems, and £470m for port and inland infrastructure.

The Freight Transport Association's UK policy director Elizabeth de Jong stated that a "make do and mend" approach will be necessary while waiting for the necessary trade-related infrastructure to be built. This "mending" process is not expected to be complete until 2025, and will be inherently costly.

At the end of the transition period, Michael Gove suggests that all EU imports will be subject to inevitable border checks, constituting a significant change. Such checks would involve customs declarations, mandatory safety and security certificates, and physical checks of food and goods of animal origin.

A related consequence of Brexit is that deferred VAT payments no longer exist.

== Economic effects ==
Economists expect that Brexit will have damaging immediate and longer-term effects on the economies of the UK and at least part of the 27 other EU member states. In particular, there is a broad consensus among economists and in the economic literature that Brexit will likely reduce the UK's real per capita income in the medium and long term, and that the Brexit referendum itself damaged the economy. (Note: See:) Studies on effects since the referendum show a reduction in GDP, trade and investment, as well as household losses from increased inflation.

=== Immediate ===
According to one study, the referendum result had pushed up UK inflation by 1.7 percentage points in 2017, leading to an annual cost of £404 for the average British household. Subsequent data shows that the Brexit referendum pushed up UK inflation by 2.9%, which amounts to annual costs of £870 for the average UK household. Studies published in 2018, estimated that the economic costs of the Brexit vote were 2.1% of GDP, or 2.5% of GDP. According to a December 2017 Financial Times analysis, the Brexit referendum results had reduced national British income by between 0.6% and 1.3%. A 2018 analysis by Stanford University and Nottingham University economists estimated that uncertainty around Brexit reduced investment by businesses by approximately 6 percentage points and caused an employment reduction of 1.5 percentage points. A number of studies found that Brexit-induced uncertainty about the UK's future trade policy reduced British international trade from June 2016 onwards. A 2019 analysis found that British firms substantially increased offshoring to the European Union after the Brexit referendum, whereas European firms reduced new investments in the UK.

In January 2021 British firms halted exports to the European Union: this resulted in between 2/3 and 3/4 of maritime HGV coming from the EU to return empty to the EU, while maritime British export were reduced by 68% compared to January 2020.

=== In the long term ===
There is overwhelming or near-unanimous agreement among economists that leaving the European Union will adversely affect the British economy in the medium- and long-term. (Note: See:) Surveys of economists in 2016 showed overwhelming agreement that Brexit would likely reduce the UK's real per-capita income level. 2019 and 2017 surveys of existing academic research found that the credible estimates ranged between GDP losses of 1.2–4.5% for the UK, and a cost of between 1–10% of the UK's income per capita. These estimates differ depending on whether the UK exits the EU with a hard Brexit or soft Brexit. In January 2018, the UK government's own Brexit analysis was leaked; it showed that UK economic growth would be stunted by 2–8% in total over the 15 years following Brexit, the amount depending on the leave scenario.

According to most economists, EU membership has a strong positive effect on trade and as a result the UK's trade would be worse off if it left the EU. According to a study by University of Cambridge economists, under a "hard Brexit" whereby the UK reverts to WTO rules, one-third of UK exports to the EU would be tariff-free, one-quarter would face high trade barriers and other exports risk tariffs in the range of 1–10%. A 2017 study found that "almost all UK regions are systematically more vulnerable to Brexit than regions in any other country." A 2017 study examining the economic impact of Brexit-induced reductions in migration" found that there would likely be "a significant negative impact on UK GDP per capita (and GDP), with marginal positive impacts on wages in the low-skill service sector." It is unclear how changes in trade and foreign investment will interact with immigration, but these changes are likely to be important.

With Brexit, the EU would lose its second-largest economy, the country with the third-largest population and "the financial capital of the world", as the German newspaper Münchner Merkur put it. Population is reduced from 513 million (EU-28) to 447 million (EU-27_2020). GDP is down from 15.9 trillion (EU-28) to 13.5 trillion (EU-27_2020); GDP per capita changes from 31,000 (EU-28) to 30,000 (EU-27_2020). Furthermore, the EU would lose its second-largest net contributor to the EU budget (2015: Germany €14.3 billion, United Kingdom €11.5 billion, France €5.5 billion). Thus, the departure of Britain would result in an additional financial burden for the remaining net contributors, unless the budget is reduced accordingly: Germany, for example, would have to pay an additional €4.5 billion for 2019 and again for 2020; in addition, the UK would no longer be a shareholder in the European Investment Bank, in which only EU members can participate. Britain's share amounts to 16%, €39.2 billion (2013), which Britain would withdraw unless there is an EU treaty change.

All the remaining EU members (as well as Switzerland, Norway and Iceland) will also likely experience adverse effects (albeit smaller effects than the UK), in particular Ireland, the Netherlands and Belgium.

=== In the short term ===
Short-term macroeconomic forecasts by the Bank of England and other banks of what would happen immediately after the Brexit referendum were too pessimistic. The assessments assumed that the referendum results would create greater uncertainty in markets and reduce consumer confidence more than it did. A number of economists noted that short-term macroeconomic forecasts are generally considered unreliable and that they are something that academic economists do not do, unlike banks. Economists have compared short-term economic forecasts to weather forecasts whereas the long-term economic forecasts are akin to climate forecasts: the methodologies used in long-term forecasts are "well-established and robust".

=== Regional inequality in UK ===
Studies on the economic impact that different forms of Brexit will have on different parts of the country indicate that Brexit will exacerbate regional economic inequality in the UK, as already struggling regions will be hardest hit by Brexit.

=== UK financial sector ===
Economists have warned that London's future as an international financial centre depends on whether the UK will obtain passporting rights for British banks from the European Union. If banks located in the UK cannot obtain passporting rights, they have strong incentives to relocate to financial centres within the EU. According to John Armour, Professor of Law and Finance at Oxford University, "a 'soft' Brexit, whereby the UK leaves the EU but remains in the single market, would be a lower-risk option for the British financial industry than other Brexit options, because it would enable financial services firms to continue to rely on regulatory passporting rights." Goldman Sachs and Morgan Stanley are among the financial firms that have moved some of their business away from the UK to Europe to avoid disruptions anticipated by Brexit.

== Energy ==
According to a 2017 study by the University of Exeter and Chatham House researchers, there are considerable benefits for the UK to be integrated into the European energy market. The study notes, "if the UK wants to enjoy the economic benefits of remaining part of what is an increasingly integrated European electricity market then, as European legislation is currently drafted, it will not only have to forgo an element of autonomy through accepting legislation and regulations made collectively at the EU level, but it will also lose much of its voice in that decision making process, effectively becoming a rule-taker rather than a rule-maker."

== EU institutions and agencies ==
=== Council of the EU ===
Analyses indicate that the departure of the relatively economically liberal UK will reduce the ability of remaining economically liberal countries to block measures in the Council of the EU. According to the Lisbon Treaty (2009), decisions of the Council are made by qualified majority voting, which means that a majority view can be blocked should at least four members of the Council, representing at least 35% of the population of the Union, choose to do so. In many policy votes, Britain, allied with other northern EU allies (Germany, Ireland, the Netherlands, and the Scandinavian and the Baltic states), had a blocking minority of 35%.

=== European Parliament ===
The UK's 73 seats in the European Parliament became vacant upon its withdrawal in 2020. 27 of these seats were redistributed to other countries, with the remaining 46 reserved for potential new member states, reducing the overall number of MEPs from 751 to 705. UK MEPs retained full rights to participate in the European Parliament until withdrawal, though there were discussions about excluding UK MEPs from key committee positions.

In April 2017, a group of European lawmakers discussed what should be done about the vacated seats when the UK leaves the EU. One plan, supported by Gianni Pittella and Emmanuel Macron, was to replace the 73 seats with a pan-European constituency list; other options which were considered include dropping the British seats without replacement, and reassigning some or all of the existing seats from other countries to reduce inequality of representation.

There was a political shift in the European Parliament, with 8 more seats for the right: 5 for the right wing PPE and 3 from the far right ID, and 13 seats less for the left: 6 less for the Greens, 6 less for the S&D, and one less for the GUE/GNL. The Greens become a group smaller than the far right.

The European Parliament constituencies in the United Kingdom disappeared after Brexit.

=== EU agencies ===
Brexit requires the offices and staff of the European Medicines Agency and European Banking Authority, previously based in London, to move out of the UK. The agencies, which together employ more than 1,000 people, are currently located in Amsterdam and Paris.

== Farming ==
With Brexit, the UK leaves the Common Agricultural Policy (CAP), which provides financial support to farmers in the EU. Most of the payments to farmers comes from the EU budget, paid for by contributions from member states. However, the UK receives much less than it contributes, and the CAP has been criticised for encouraging farming which harms the environment, favouring big landowners and imposing high food prices.

Brexit allows the UK to develop its own agriculture policy. The UK government and devolved legislatures have set out plans to support farmers while enhancing the environment. The current UK government has committed to maintaining the same payments to farmers until the end of the current parliament, even without a withdrawal agreement. The Agriculture Bill is intended to replace the CAP with a new system based on paying farmers "public money for public goods" such as environmental protection, public access to the countryside and measures to reduce flooding. The UK government has also said it will ensure continued "access to seasonal agricultural labour" from abroad after Brexit. Farming unions warned that a "no-deal" Brexit, however, would have had "severe impacts" on farming.

== Fisheries ==
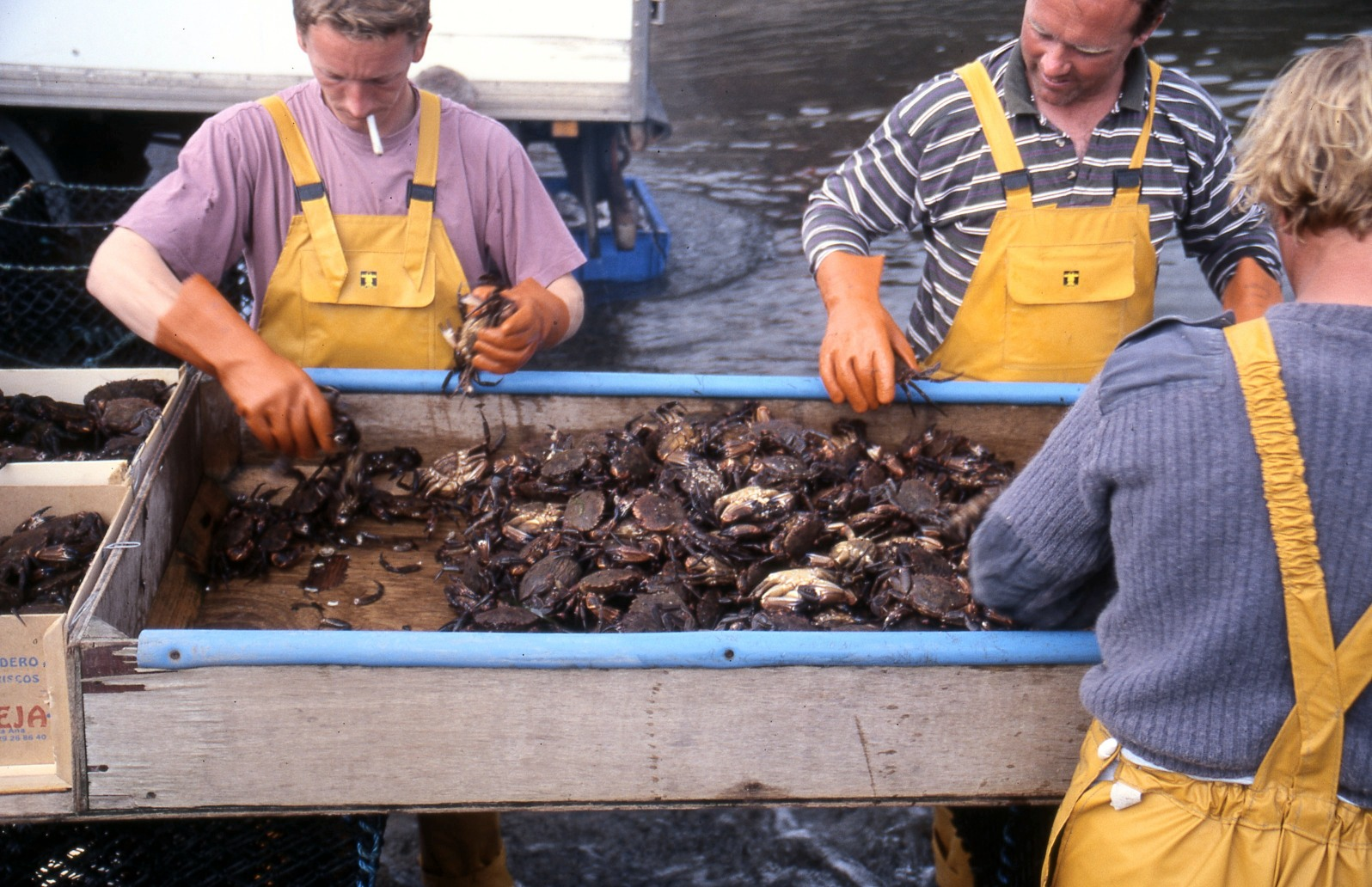
Smoking fishermen sorting velvet crabs at Fionnphort, Scotland

After Brexit, the UK left the Common Fisheries Policy (CFP) that lets all EU countries fish within 12 nautical miles of the UK coast and lets the EU set catch quotas. The UK fishing industry has long criticised the CFP, arguing that it favours non-UK fishermen because the UK has a larger fishing zone than most of its neighbours. The combined EU fishing fleets land about 6 million tonnes of fish per year, about half of which are from UK waters. The UK's share of the overall catch is about 750,000 tonnes.

The UK has become an independent coastal state and is fully responsible for managing fisheries in its Exclusive Economic Zone (EEZ), extending 200 nautical miles (nm) from shore. It still is bound by the UN Law of the Sea Convention, which requires it to co-operate with neighbors on managing shared fish stocks and prevent overfishing. By leaving the CFP, the UK could develop fisheries policy that better suits its needs. The UK also leaves the London Fisheries Convention that lets Irish, French, Belgian, Dutch and German vessels fish within six nautical miles of the UK's coast. This was welcomed by the National Federation of Fishermen's Organisations and the Scottish government, but the Irish fishing industry expressed concern as a third of its catch is from UK waters.

Access for foreign fishing vessels to UK waters is a matter for negotiation. According to Wageningen Economic Research, if there was a "hard Brexit that banned EU fishermen from UK waters", British fishermen could catch more fish but the price of their fish would drop, while the resulting trade barriers would lead to higher seafood prices for consumers, because the UK imports most of its seafood. This would be a "lose-lose situation" for both the UK and the EU, and for both British consumers and the fishing industry. According to a 2018 study, "Brexit poses a major challenge to the stability of European fisheries management [...] potentially putting at risk recent recovery and future sustainability of shared fish stocks". It said that denying access to foreign fishing vessels would risk tariffs being imposed, while granting access and seeking a more modest re-balancing of fishing entitlements would lessen this risk.

In February 2020, as soon as the withdrawal occurred, Fisheries issue was raised in Guernsey. After the first ban, a temporary "régime d’autorisation" has been set up to allow individual boats to fish in Guernsey.

Following the end of the Brexit transition period, fish from Iceland that used to be shipped to Britain for export to the rest of the EU began to be shipped to Rotterdam. This is separate from fish intended for the UK market.

In March 2021 the UK Government announced the fishing quotas that became available following Brexit would be split between the four home nations.

In May 2021, France threatened to cut off electricity to the British Channel Island of Jersey in a fight over post-Brexit fishing rights, as part of the 2021 Jersey dispute.

On 1 January 2021, the status of UK shellfish changed; previously as part of the EU, shellfish caught in the UK could be live shipped to EU customers directly. However, as the UK is no longer an EU member, shellfish now must be purified and ready to eat on export. This means they have been kept in clean water tanks for up to 28 days before shipping. This change in status effectively banned all UK live shellfish exports until the industry switches to the new process.

== Health ==
A 2019 study in the Lancet suggested that Brexit would have an adverse impact on health services in the UK under every Brexit scenario, but that a no-deal Brexit would have had the worst impact. The study found that Brexit would deplete the National Health Service (NHS) workforce, create uncertainties regarding care for British nationals living in the EU, and put at risk access to vaccines, equipment, and medicines. It was claimed that supplies of life saving medications including cancer medication could have been disrupted for up to six months in no-deal Brexit. The Department of Health and Social Care stated in August 2019 that it had taken steps to ensure the supply of medicines and medical products remains uninterrupted after Brexit.

== Law and courts ==
After Brexit, the UK has the final say over the laws that govern it. Under the European Union (Withdrawal) Act 2018, which was passed by the British parliament, EU laws no longer have supremacy over UK laws after Brexit. To maintain continuity, the Act converts EU law into UK law as "retained EU law". After Brexit, the British parliament (and the devolved legislatures) can decide which elements of that law to keep, amend or repeal. Furthermore, UK courts are no longer bound by the judgments of the EU Court of Justice after Brexit. Its case law from before Brexit will still apply to UK courts, but the UK Supreme Court is not bound by it. According to Catherine Barnard from UK in a Changing Europe, any future UK–EU trade agreement will require some EU law to take precedence in UK law.

The basic principles of contract law were not significantly affected by Brexit, but businesses were advised to consider the practical impact of withdrawal on the costs and obligations of a contract. Generic clauses regarding force majeure or frustration, and specific "Brexit clauses" anticipating the potential impact of Brexit, were considered by some companies and legal advisers to protect against Brexit's business impact. Brexit leaves Ireland and Cyprus as the only two remaining common law jurisdictions in the EU. Paul Gallagher, a former Attorney General of Ireland, has suggested this isolates those countries and deprives them of a powerful partner that shared a common interest in ensuring that EU legislation was not drafted or interpreted in a way that would be contrary to the principles of the common law. Lucinda Creighton, a former Irish government minister for legal affairs, has said that Ireland relied on the "bureaucratic capacity of the UK" to understand, influence and implement EU legislation.

== Migration ==
After Brexit, the UK is able to control immigration from the EU and EEA. Being part of the EU and EEA means that citizens of any member state can move to the UK to live and work with very little restrictions (freedom of movement). The European Union (Withdrawal) Act 2018 retains freedom of movement as UK law until it is repealed. The Immigration and Social Security Co-ordination (EU Withdrawal) Bill would repeal free movement and make EU immigration subject to UK law. The current UK government intends to replace it with a new system. The government's 2018 white paper proposed a "skills-based immigration system" that prioritizes skilled migrants, limits the length of time low-skilled migrants can work in the UK, and applies a stricter criminality threshold. EU and EEA citizens already living in the UK can continue living there after Brexit by applying to the EU Settlement Scheme, which began in March 2019. Irish citizens will not have to apply to the scheme. If there had been a no-deal Brexit, EU citizens who arrived in the UK before the end of 2020 could have applied to stay until the end of 2023.

Studies estimating the long-term impact of Brexit on immigration note that many factors affect future migration flows but that Brexit and the end of free movement will likely result in a large decline in immigration from EEA countries to the UK. The Migration Policy Institute estimated immediately after the referendum that the UK "would continue to receive 500,000 or more immigrants (from EU and non-EU countries taken together) per year, with annual net migration around 200,000". The decline in EEA immigration is likely to have an adverse impact on the British health sector.

Official figures for June 2016–June 2017 showed that net non-British EU immigration to the UK slowed to about 100,000 immigrants per year (corresponding to the immigration level of 2014) while immigration from outside the EU rose. Taken together, the two inflows into the UK resulted in an only slightly reduced net immigration of 230,000 newcomers. The Head of the Office for National Statistics suggested that Brexit could be a factor for the slowdown in EU immigration, but cautioned there might be other reasons. The number of non-British EU nurses registering with the NHS fell from 1,304 in July 2016 to 46 in April 2017.

Since the referendum, some British citizens have attempted to retain their EU citizenship by applying to other EU member states for citizenship, and petitioning the European Commission.

Long-term net migration to the United Kingdom (the number of people immigrating minus the number emigrating) reached a record high of 764,000 in 2022, with immigration at 1.26 million and emigration at 493,000. Of the 1,218,000 immigrants who came to the UK in 2023, only 126,000 were citizens of EU member states. BBC reported that "In the 12 months to June 2023, net EU migration was -86,000, meaning more EU nationals left the UK than arrived". According to social scientist Nando Sigona, "[Europeans] are not coming any more in larger numbers. The economy still needs additional workers, so this is why [the government has] increased the number of these work permits for people from outside the European Union." EU citizens working in the health and social care sector have been replaced by migrants from non-EU countries such as India and Nigeria. After Brexit, the number of EU citizens who were refused entry to the UK increased fivefold.

=== Sport ===
Currently, EEA sportspersons face minimal bureaucracy when playing in the UK. After Brexit, any EU citizen wanting to do so could be required to hold a work permit. Such work permits can be tricky to obtain, especially for young or lower ranked players. Conversely, British nationals playing in EEA states may encounter similar obstacles where none exist today.

It has been computed that with Brexit, people like N'Golo Kanté or Riyad Mahrez would not have qualified to work in England or Wales. The same occurs with those under 18, such as Cesc Fàbregas or Paul Pogba when they signed for their respective English clubs.

An agreement will be need to be reached on how regulations might change after Brexit when UK will no longer be a member of the Espace économique européen.

== Opinions ==
After Brexit opinion might diverge with some percentages of people considering UK and the EU have the same interest after Brexit while other consider interests are at odd. Also some British people are happy with Brexit when others are not. One of the top priorities of the British is to ease trade between the independent island and the EU, according to IPSOS.

== People ==
The UK has three separate agreements with the 31 different European countries that accept the freedom of movement act.

Firstly, The current Withdrawal Agreement broadly maintains the rights British citizens, who are lawfully resident in EU member states, already have though a leave of absence extending a five year period would invalidate these rights.

Secondly, with regards to Norway, Iceland and Liechtenstein each of whom are not EU members, yet are entitled to freedom of movement due to their membership in the European Economic Area (EEA), mirror the offer in The Withdrawal Agreement.

Finally, in the case of Switzerland which is neither a member of the EU nor the EAA also accepts the freedom of movement under The Withdrawal Agreement.

Still unresolved remains the issue of "posted workers" (per the definition in Council Directive 96/71/EC), and other complexities following the withdrawal.

In France, on 15 March 2020, 800 elected conseillers municipaux of British nationality no longer had the right to be reelected, as a result of Brexit.

For European citizens, entering the UK will require a passport from October 2021 and onward (i.e. an identity card will no longer be sufficient).

=== Citizenship ===
Since the Withdrawal Agreement came into force on 1 February 2020, British nationals "no longer enjoy the status of citizen of the Union, nor, more specifically the right to vote and to stand as a candidate in municipal elections in their Member State of residence, including where they are also deprived, by virtue of the law of the State of which they are nationals, of the right to vote in elections held by that State." "This is an automatic consequence of the sole sovereign decision taken by the United Kingdom to withdraw from the European Union," according to the treaties and confirmed by the ECJ ruling.

== Statistics ==
Following Brexit, the Office for National Statistics set to develop a domestic statistical classification framework separate from Nomenclature of Territorial Units for Statistics, a European geocode standard. Currently, the British geocode standard, International Territorial Level is a mirror to the pre-existing NUTS system, but the review scheduled for 2024.

== Transport ==
=== Aviation ===
By leaving the EU, the UK would leave the European Common Aviation Area (ECAA), a single market in commercial air travel. The UK will negotiate a future relationship with the EU on the "basis of equivalence of traffic rights and a level playing field". It could negotiate to re-join as a non-EU member (like Bosnia and Herzegovina), negotiate access through a bilateral agreement (like Switzerland), or negotiate a new 'open skies' bilateral deal with the EU. If there is a "no-deal" Brexit, UK airlines will still have permission to operate within the EU with no restrictions, and vice versa. UK airlines licensed before Brexit will still have permission to operate provided they are majority owned and effectively controlled by nationals of the UK and/or nationals of the EU and EEA.

The UK government seeks continued participation in the European Aviation Safety Agency (EASA). Otherwise, the UK's Civil Aviation Authority would take on the role of regulator for UK airlines. A substantial increase in CAA staff and resources would be needed to meet the demands of its new role.

The UK has its own air service agreements with 111 countries, which permit flights to-and-from the country, and these will continue after Brexit. It has air service agreements with a further 17 countries through its EU membership, and it has sought to replace these. By July 2019, the UK had concluded air service agreements with the United States, Canada Switzerland, Albania, Georgia, Iceland, Israel, Jordan, Kosovo, Moldova, Montenegro, Morocco, North Macedonia and Norway.

Three British airlines, Monarch, Flybmi and Thomas Cook, went bankrupt in the period 2017–2019; all three bankruptcies have been partially attributed to Brexit, more specifically the political uncertainty of the Brexit process and the falling exchange rates of the Pound sterling.

=== Rail ===
The EU announced that the Channel Tunnel rail link would remain open on current terms for three months if there had been a "no-deal" Brexit. The EU Commission said this should be enough time for new permanent arrangements to be agreed.

=== Road traffic ===
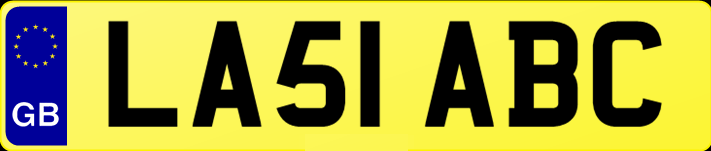
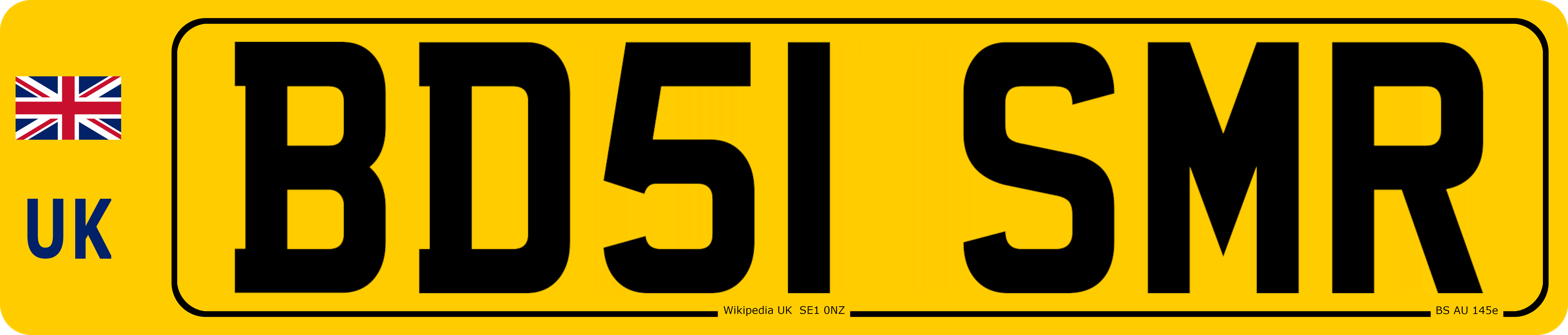
After the UK withdrew from the EU, only a registration plate featuring the Union Jack flag and the country code UK satisfies the Vienna Convention on Road Traffic as those registration plates display the international vehicle registration code for the country of registration (UK) incorporated into the vehicle registration plate, and is supplemented with a flag or emblem of the national state. Until the UK withdrew from the EU, the EU format was also valid within countries party to the Vienna Convention of Road Traffic as it displayed the country code supplemented with the symbol of the regional economic integration organisation (EU stars) the country belongs. The EU format was still valid within the EU during the transition period which ended on 31 December 2020. The rules now vary from country to country. In Spain, Cyprus and Malta, an oval sticker is also needed. In other EU countries a registration plate displaying UK and the Union Jack (but not a different flag) is sufficient. Prior to 28 September 2021 the UK's identifier was "GB".

While the UK no longer benefits from EU road traffic policy, the UK entered or remains a member of other treaties which provide some kinds of transport facility.

The Vienna Convention on Road Traffic is recorded by the UN, not the EU, allowing road traffic between the UK and EU member states member of that convention.

==== Driving licences ====
EU law continued to apply to the UK during the transition period and UK driving licences were valid in the EU, and EU driving licences were valid in the UK, until 31 December 2020.

From 1 January 2021, UK driving licence holders are still able to use their driving licence to drive in the EU for short visits, although with some exceptions. Where the exceptions apply, International Driving Permits, governed by treaties such as the 1949 Geneva Convention on Road Traffic and the 1968 Vienna Convention on Road Traffic, facilitate driving between the UK and the EU/EEA countries. Depending on which convention the country in question has ratified, an IDP governed by the 1949 Geneva Convention might be required in some EEA countries, and an IDP governed by the 1968 Vienna Convention in other EEA countries.

From 1 January 2021, UK driving licenses are no longer European driving licences, so that UK driving license holders now require an IDP to drive in those non-EU/EEA countries which recognise European, but not UK, driving licences. So an IDP is required to drive in several countries in Europe (e.g. a 1949 IDP in Andorra, and a 1968 IDP in Albania, Monaco and Turkey).

When no driving license agreement exists, British drivers lose their driving licences.

==== Freight ====
The UK was in the European Common Transit Convention (CTC) as an EU member and has negotiated continuous membership after Brexit. This would apply to any new trading relationship with the EU. The CTC applies to moving goods between the EU member states, the EFTA countries (Iceland, Norway, Liechtenstein and Switzerland) as well as Turkey, Macedonia and Serbia. The CTC, with its supplementary Convention on the Simplification of Formalities in the Trade of Goods, reduces administrative burdens on traders by removing the need for additional import/export declarations when transiting customs territories, and provides cash flow benefits by allowing the movement of goods across a customs territory without the payment of duties until the final destination.

Under the EU–UK Trade and Cooperation Agreement (TCA) mutual market access for the transport of goods is limited to point-to-point crossborder transports, with up to two extra movements (cabotage) in the other party's territory permitted.

==== Passenger transport ====
Except in Ireland, mutual market access for passenger transport is limited under the TCA to point-to-point crossborder transports. Bus services on the island of Ireland can continue to pick up and set down passengers in both Ireland and Northern Ireland.

==== Private transport ====
From 1 January 2021, drivers taking their own cars to the EU or EEA now need a green card issued under the International Motor Insurance Card System to prove that their cars are insured. Trailers and caravans need separate green cards.

=== Shipping ===
Ferries continue with obstacles such as customs checks: To avoid such an issue, new ferry departures between the Republic of Ireland and the European mainland have been established.

== Security ==
Concerns were raised in 2018 that Brexit might create security problems for the UK, particularly in law enforcement and counter-terrorism where the UK could use the EU's databases on individuals crossing the British border. Security experts have credited the EU's information-sharing databases with helping to foil terrorist plots. British leaders have expressed support for retaining access to those information-sharing databases, but it could be complicated to obtain access as a non-member of the EU. Brexit would also complicate extradition requests. Under a hard Brexit scenario, the UK would lose access to databases comprising European plane travel records, vehicle registrations, fingerprints, and DNA profiles.

== UK bilateral international agreements ==
Before the withdrawal agreement was ratified, the Financial Times said that there were approximately 759 international agreements, spanning 168 non-EU countries, that the UK would no longer have been a party to upon leaving the EU.

== UK–EU relationship post-Brexit ==
United Kingdom European Union

The UK's post-Brexit relationship with the EU and its members is governed by the Brexit withdrawal agreement and the EU–UK Trade and Cooperation Agreement as of August 2021.

Following the UK's withdrawal from the EU on 31 January 2020, (Note: GMT, 1 February CET) the UK continued to conform to EU regulations and to participate in the EU Customs Union during the "Brexit transition period", which began on 1 February 2020 and ended on 31 December 2020. This allowed for a period of time to negotiate a bilateral trade agreement between the UK and the EU.

A research paper presented to the UK Parliament in July 2013 proposed a number of alternatives to being a member state which would continue to allow access to the EU internal market. These include remaining in the European Economic Area, negotiating deep bilateral agreements on the Swiss and Norwegian model, or leaving the EU without EEA membership or a trade agreement under the WTO Option.

== UK relations with CANZUK countries and the United States ==
Pro-Brexit activists and politicians have argued for negotiating trade and migration agreements with the "CANZUK" countries—those of Canada, Australia, New Zealand and the United Kingdom. Numerous academics have criticised this alternative for EU membership as "post-imperial nostalgia". Economists note that distance reduces trade, a key aspect of the gravity model of trade, which means that even if the UK could obtain similar trade terms with the CANZUK countries as it had as part of the Single Market, it would be far less valuable to the UK.

In August 2019 United States President Donald Trump pledged to negotiate a "very big trade deal" with the UK after Brexit. Trump and the U.S. would ultimately would not reach a trade deal with the U.K. before Trump's presidency ended in January 2021.

In November 2020 Canada and the UK reached an interim post-Brexit trade agreement called "Canada-United Kingdom Trade Continuity Agreement" and would set the stage for further more comprehensive agreements at a later date.

Post-Brexit, AUKUS was possible as a result of the UK not entering into a formal foreign policy and security treaty in the post-Brexit deal with the EU. As a result, the UK was free to pursue enhanced cooperation with other allies.

== World Trade Organization ==
Questions have arisen over how existing international arrangements with the EU under WTO terms should evolve. Some countries—such as Australia and the US—wish to challenge the basis for division (i.e., division between the UK and the continuing EU) of the trade schedules previously agreed between them and the EU, because it reduces their flexibility.

On 8 March 2021, the US agreed a way to split tariff rate quotes (TRQ) between the EU and the UK.
