= Shuiwei =

Area of Futian District, Shenzhen, Guangdong, China

Coordinates: 22°31′20″N 114°03′31″E

Shuiwei (simplified Chinese: 水围; traditional Chinese: 水圍; pinyin: Shuǐwéi; Jyutping: seoi2 wai4) is an area of Futian District, Shenzhen, Guangdong, China.

Shuiwei's main public square features a wall displaying the history of the area, portraying the Guang family and a 1908 invasion of the area by the British; area residents were credited with repelling the said invasion.

== History ==
The area is known as the home of a local family with the surname Zhuang, and historically residents spoke the Weitou dialect and made their living through farming and fishing. Local legends stated that the founder of Shuiwei was Zhuang Luogong, a descendant of Zhuangzi. Shenzhen-based American anthropologist Mary Ann O'Donnell described a statue of Zhuangzi, flanked by water, as being "the heart of Shuiwei". Water historically flowed through many areas of Shuiwei.

Around the 1980s residents took goods from Hong Kong and re-sold them on the Mainland side. At a later point factories became commonplace and industry became the heart of the local economy. The Shenzhen government pursued a redevelopment scheme, spending 1.2 million yuan ($178,000 U.S. dollars) to acquire land on the Shum Chun River. The area authorities promoted the Shuiwei model of redevelopment, which was meant to attract employees of white collar firms with conversion of existing housing into apartments.

By the 1990s some women who originated from other parts of China and did not have Shenzhen hukou moved to Shuiwei, with some of them doing so to evade issues related to the One Child Policy.

Circa the 2000s Shuiwei was in proximity to red light zones near Shuiwei checkpoint.
