= Lady Elizabeth School =

The Lady Elizabeth School

Location
- Entrada Urbanización Cumbre del Sol s/n Benitachell, Province of Alicante, 03726; Spain

Information
- Type: private
- Motto: Learning is the process of repeated experiences by which we hardwire getting better at knowledge, skills and understanding through good struggles, in different ways and over different time periods.
- Opened: 1987
- Principal: Simon Berry
- Grades: from Pre-Nursery to 6th Form
- Campus type: day
- Houses: Blue House; Green House; Yellow House; Red House
- Website: laudeladyelizabeth.com

The Lady Elizabeth School is an English International school in the Province of Alicante, Spain, located in Benitachell.

== History ==
It opened in 1987 with a Junior School. Its Secondary School opened in the 1990s. The company LAUDE began operating the school in 2007. In 2018, their Secondary School moved to a new location, next to their junior school at the Cumbre del Sol.

== Student body ==
In 2010 there were 620 pupils, 60% British and 35% Spanish. In 2025 there were 1300 pupils,30% British,25% Spanish, 15% Russian, and 7% Polish.
