= Spaniards in the United Kingdom =

British residents of Spanish descent

Spaniards in the United Kingdom Españoles en el Reino Unido
- Distribution of Spanish citizens by local authority in England, Wales, & Northern Ireland

Total population
- Spanish-born residents in the United Kingdom: 180,444 (2021/22 census) (Note: Including the Canary Islands. Does not include Spaniards born in the United Kingdom or those with Spanish ancestry); England: 163,848 (2021 census); Wales: 3,068 (2021 census); Scotland: 12,208 (2022 census); Northern Ireland: 1,320 (2021 census); Spanish citizens/passports held: 216,728 (England and Wales only, 2021); Citizens registered with Spanish consulate 102,498 (2016)

Regions with significant populations
- West London (Kensington, Chelsea, Lambeth, Holborn), Manchester, Bristol, Nottingham, Cambridge

Languages
- British English, Peninsular Spanish, Catalan, Galician, Basque

Religion
- Predominantly Roman Catholic

Related ethnic groups
- Italian; Portuguese

Spaniards in the United Kingdom are people of Spanish descent resident in Britain. They may be British citizens or non-citizen immigrants. In the 2021 census for England and Wales, 81,150 people self-identified as ethnic Spanish.

== History ==
=== Migration of royalty ===
Spanish and English royalty intermarried on numerous occasions, a notable example is found in King Edward I and Eleanor of Castile, parents of King Edward II. In 1501, Catherine of Aragon came to London aged 15. After the early death of her first husband, she became Henry VIII's first wife. Their daughter, Mary Tudor attempted to re-introduce Catholicism as the state religion during her own reign and married Philip II of Spain. Both women at that time brought the influence of Spanish culture to the royal court.

=== Spanish Civil War ===
After the bombing of Guernica, 4,091 refugees, the vast majority of them children under 15, arrived in Southampton on the SS Habana. They were cared for in 'colonies' mostly in and around the Home counties. The children began to be repatriated in November 1937.

== Demographics ==
The 2001 UK Census recorded 54,482 Spanish-born people. 54,105 of these were resident in Great Britain (that is, the UK excluding Northern Ireland). The equivalent figure in the 1991 Census was 38,606. The census tracts with the highest numbers of Spanish-born residents in 2001 were Kensington, Regent's Park and Chelsea, all in west London. The 2011 UK Census recorded 77,554 Spanish-born residents in England, 1,630 in Wales, 4,908 in Scotland and 703 in Northern Ireland.

According to Instituto Nacional de Estadística statistics, the number of Spanish citizens registered with the Spanish consulate in the UK was 102,498 as of 1 January 2016. The Office for National Statistics estimates that the Spanish-born population of the UK was 164,000 in 2020.

At the time of the 2021/22 census, there were 163,848 Spanish-born residents in England, 3,068 in Wales, 12,208 in Scotland and 1,320 in Northern Ireland. There were 216,728 Spanish passport holders in England & Wales, an increase of over 130,000 since the time of the 2011 census. The areas with the highest concentrations of Spanish citizens were South and West London, including the boroughs of Kensington and Chelsea, Lambeth, and Southwark. The North West also has a significant Spanish population in Lancashire and Manchester.

== Economics ==
According to analysis by the Institute for Public Policy Research, 71.22 per cent of recent Spanish immigrants to the UK of working age are employed as opposed to unemployed or inactive (which includes students), compared to 73.49 per cent of British-born people. 15.05 per cent of recent Spanish-born immigrants are low earners, defined as having an income of less than £149.20 per week (compared to 21.08 per cent of British-born people), and 2.15 per cent are high earners, earning more than £750 per week (compared to 6.98 per cent of British-born people). Amongst settled Spanish-born immigrants, 71.48 per cent are employed, with 23.44 per cent being low earners and 7.81 per cent high earners.

== Education ==
There is a Spanish school in London, Instituto Español Vicente Cañada Blanch.

== See also ==
- Other White
- Spain–United Kingdom relations
- Spanish Australian
- British migration to Spain
- Gibraltarians in the United Kingdom
