= International Brain Bee =

The International Brain Bee (IBB) is a neuroscience competition for teenagers. The IBB was founded in 1999 by Norbert Myslinski, and consists of over 200 chapters in more than 50 regions on 6 continents. Its purpose is to help treat and find cures for brain disorders by inspiring and motivating students to pursue careers in basic and clinical neuroscience.

The IBB governing body is a consortium consisting of the American Psychological Association, Dana Alliance for Brain Initiatives, Federation of European Neuroscience Societies, International Brain Research Organization, and Society for Neuroscience. Winners of the chapter competitions are invited to compete in their respective region championships, where they vie for the right to compete in the world championship. Past venues for the world championship include Montreal, Canada; San Diego, USA; Vienna, Austria; Washington, DC, USA; Cape Town, South Africa; Florence, Italy; Cairns, Australia; Baltimore, USA; Toronto, Canada; and Copenhagen, Denmark.

== Past champions ==
=== International ===
Winners at the international level competed against representatives from other nations.

Year	First place Winner	Country	Second place Winner	Country	Third place Winner	Country
1999	David Alpay	Canada				
2000	Otilia Husu	United States				
2001	Arjun Bharioke	United States				
2002	Marvin Chum	Canada				
2003	Saroj Kunnakkat	United States				
2004	Bhaktapriya Nagalla	United States				
2005	John Liu	United States				
2006	Jong Park	Canada				
2007	Melody Hu	United States				
2008	Elena Perry	United States				
2009	Julia Chartove	United States	Kate Burgess	New Zealand		
2010	Ritika Chohani	India	Ben Thompson	Australia		
2011	Thanh-Liem Huynh-Tran	United States		United States		
2012	Teresa Tang	Australia	Ionut Flavius Bratu	Romania		
2013	Jackson Huang	Australia	Giulio Deangeli	Italy		
2014	Gayathri Muthukumar	India	Eva Wang	Australia		
2015	Jade Pham	Australia	Soren Christensen	United States	Andra Cristiana Stefan	Romania
2016	Ana Ghenciulescu	Romania	Nooran AbuMazen	Canada	Matthew Z.M Fulton	New Zealand
2017	Sojas Wagle	United States	Milena Malcharek	Poland	Elwin Raj A/L P. Raj Vethamuthu	Malaysia
2018	Piotr Oleksy	Poland	Giovanni De Gannes	Grenada	Huai-Ying Huang	Canada
2019	Yidou Weng	China	Natalia Koc	Poland	Kamand Soufiabadi	Iran
2020	Rahil Patel	United States	Yu Cheng Lim	Malaysia	Peter Susanto	Australia
2021	Fredrick Odezugo	Nigeria	Viktoriia Vydzhak	Ukraine	Antoni Klonowski	Canada
2022	Helene Li	Canada	Anmol Bhatia	United States	Ugne Birstonaite	Lithuania
2023	Chun Hei Tai	Hong Kong	Stanley Zhang	New Zealand	Kimia Ahmadi	Iran
2024	Samuel Richards	Australia	Lisa Wei	Canada	Siqi Pan	China

=== United States ===
Winners at the national level competed against representatives from other states.

Year	First place Winner	State	Second place Winner	State	Third place Winner	State
2007	Melody Hu	MN				
2008	Elena Perry	MD				
2009	Julia Chartove	MD				
2010	Yvette Leung	NY				
2011	Thanh-Liem Huynh-Tran	CA				
2012	Aidan Crank	PA	Sidharth Chand	MI		
2013	Emily Ruan	MN	Anvita Mishra	CA		
2014	Adam Elliot	NJ	Venkata Macha	AL		
2015	Soren Christensen	DC	Abhijeet Sambangi	MA		
2016	Karina Bao	AR	Xuchen Wei	IN	William Ellsworth	GA
2017	Sojas Wagle	AR	Aarthi Vijayakumar	MN	Amit Kannan	IN
2018	Akhil Kondepudi	MO	Hemanth Asirvatham	MN	Sehej Bindra	NJ
2019	John Yang	NJ	Julia Collin	NJ	Claire Wang	CA

== Location ==
Local brain bees take place in their respective states, while the National Brain Bee in the United States is usually held in Baltimore, Maryland. The site of the International Brain Bee changes yearly:

- 2009: Toronto, Canada
- 2010: San Diego, California, USA
- 2011: Florence, Italy
- 2012: Cape Town, South Africa
- 2013: Vienna, Austria
- 2014: Washington, D.C., USA
- 2015: Cairns, Australia
- 2016: Copenhagen, Denmark
- 2017: Washington, D.C., USA
- 2018: Berlin, Germany
- 2019: Daegu, South Korea
- 2020: Virtual [Held in 2021]
- 2021: Virtual
- 2022: Virtual
- 2023: Virtual

== Participating Countries and Regions ==
The following national and regional Brain Bee chapters are formally affiliated with the IBB and are currently active and eligible to be represented in the IBB World Championship. Each chapter is organized independently by volunteer coordinators, typically affiliated with universities or neuroscience institutions.

Region	Country / Territory	Organized By	Website
Africa	Egypt	Moataz Ibrahim Assem	Brain Bee Egypt
Africa	Ethiopia	Adam Mulugeta and Yared Zenebe	ethiopianbrainbee.com
Africa	Ghana	Robert Peter Biney	
Africa	Kenya	Mohamed Onyango	
Africa	Nigeria	Obi Augustine	neurosciencenigeria.org
Asia	Bangladesh	MD Jikrul Aqwa Khan and Shorat Kairi (Dhulikona)	brainbeebd.site
Asia	China	Jiangjie Yu	chinabrainbee.com
Asia	Hong Kong	Michael Lee	brain.org.hk
Asia	India	RMV Ravindranadh R V	brainbee.in
Asia	Iran	Ali Shahbazi	nbml.ir
Asia	Israel	Illana Gozes	davidson.weizmann.ac.il
Asia	Japan	Tetsu Okumura	jnss.org
Asia	Kazakhstan	Bayram Kenci	bil.edu.kz
Asia	Korea	Byoung-Kyong Min	
Asia	Macao	Irene Leong	
Asia	Malaysia	Muzaimi Mustapha	neuro.org.my
Asia	Mongolia	Erkhjin BatErdene	
Asia	Nepal	Sarun Koirala	
Asia	Pakistan	Touqeer Ahmed	
Asia	Palestine	Neuro-Pal Center	
Asia	Singapore	S Thameen Dheen / Singapore Neuroscience Association	neuroscience.sg
Asia	Syria	Ashraf Alkhayer and Mamon Saleh	brainbeesyria.org
Asia	Taiwan	Chih Tung Tsai	taiwanbrainbee.com
Asia	Thailand	Luke Ruedisueli	brainbeethailand.my.canva.site
Asia	United Arab Emirates	Sathy Parvathy	
Asia	Vietnam	Duc Tran	
Europe	Albania	Laura Loli-Dano	
Europe	Armenia	COBRAIN Center (Mher Kurghinyan and Patryk Stelmaszek)	
Europe	Azerbaijan	Elkhan Yusifov and Sadig Niftullayev	neuroscience.az
Europe	Croatia	Kristina Mlinac Jerković	hdn.hr
Europe	France	Brian Silvera	francebrainbee.org
Europe	Georgia	Nasrollah Moradikor and Arian Hizomi	neuroscience.edu.ge
Europe	Germany	Pierre Ekelmans	neurowissenschaften-olympiade.de
Europe	Hungary	Anna Padányi and Barbara Fülöp	
Europe	Ireland	John Kelly	
Europe	Italy	Roberto Ciccocioppa and Laura Soverchia	
Europe	Latvia	Daniel Zukovs	
Europe	Lithuania	Roma Siugzdaite	brainbee.lt
Europe	Netherlands	Marijn van Wingerden	hersenolympiade.nl
Europe	Poland	Elzbieta Malgorzata Pyza	
Europe	Romania	Cristian Gurzu	romanianbrainbee.com
Europe	Türkiye	Heja Mukader Yakut, Defne Cıngır and Ahmet Cemal Müftüoğlugil	bad.org.tr
Europe	Ukraine	Andrii Cherninskyi	brainbee.in.ua
Europe	United Kingdom	NeuroSpark	
North America	Canada	Nikol Piskuric	
South America	Mexico	Carol Warren Ornelas and Monica Rojas	
North America	Costa Rica	Georgina Grillo	
North America	Grenada	Gail Blackette	
North America	United States	Norbert Myslinski (University of Maryland)	
Oceania	Australia	Jenny Rodger, Bruno van Swinderen, Matthew Kirkcaldie	
Oceania	New Zealand	Amy Chapman	
South America	Argentina	Micaela Santilli	

== See also ==
- Deutsche Neurowissenschaften-Olympiade
