= British immigration in Spain =

Immigration of British citizens to Spain

British citizens in Spain and Spaniards of British origin Ciudadanos británicos en España y españoles de origen británico
- (Spain) (United Kingdom)

Total population
- British nationals 262,885 (2020)

Regions with significant populations
- Andalusia, the Valencian Community, the Balearic Islands, and the Canary Islands

Languages
- English, Spanish

Religion
- Anglicanism, Protestantism and Catholicism

Related ethnic groups
- Britons

British migration to Spain has resulted in Spain being home to one of the largest British-born populations outside the United Kingdom in the world, and the largest in Europe. Migration from the UK to Spain has increased rapidly since the late 1990s and the registered population of British nationals in Spain in 2014 was 297,229 (2014). After Brexit, in 2020 British nationals in Spain numbered 262,885.

== Demographics ==
=== Population size ===
In 2014, the officially registered population of British nationals in Spain was 236,669 (2014) and 107,326 in 2001.

Vertical bar chart of foreign population of British nationality in Spain between 1998 and 2020
Population (1998–2020) Foreign population in Spain of British nationality according to the Instituto Nacional de Estadística.

=== Population distribution ===
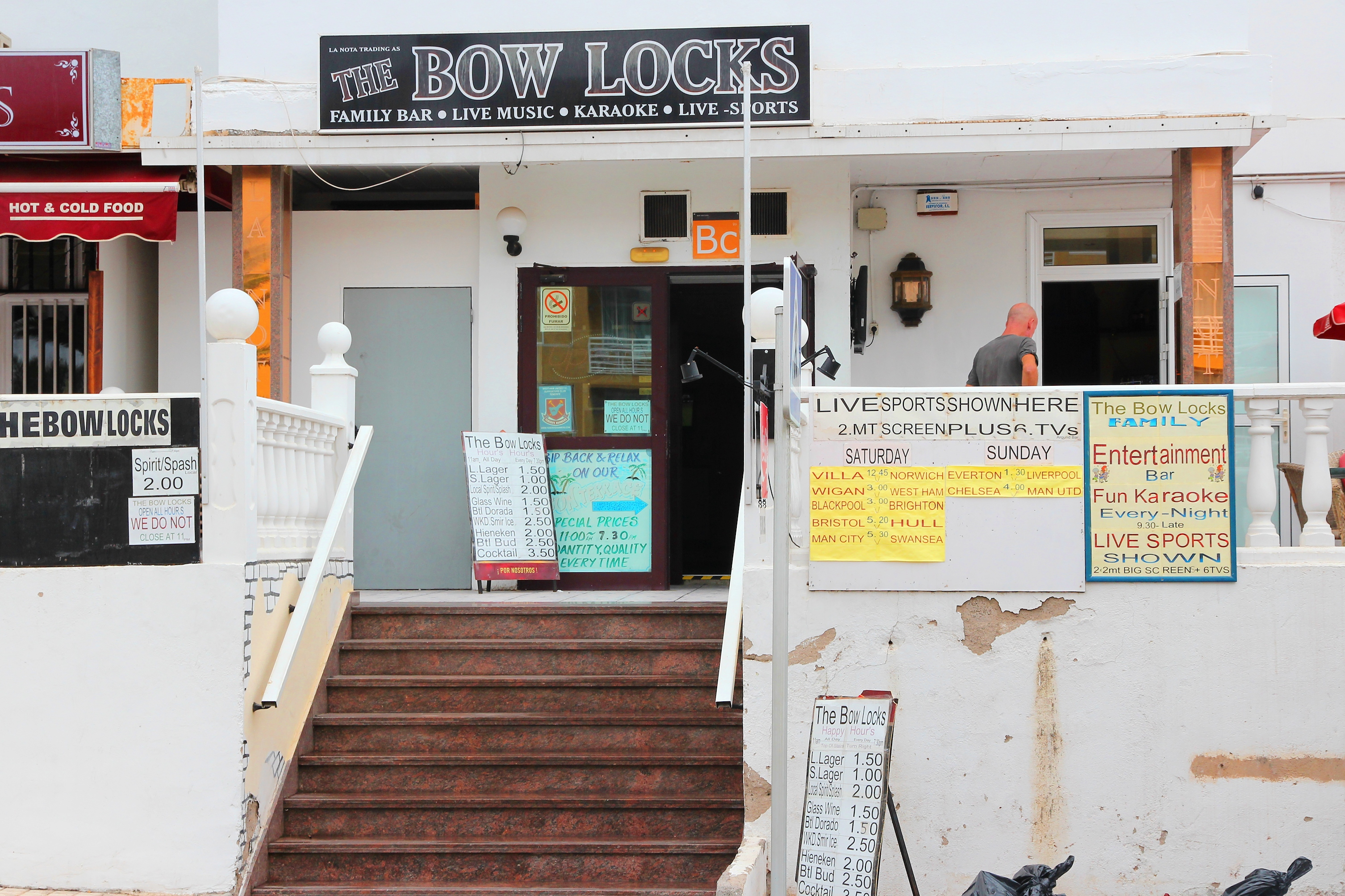
British sports bar in Tenerife

According to the data collected by the INE, the distribution of Britons in Spain in 2005 was as follows:

Location	Population
Valencian Community	82,214
Andalusia	63,472
Canary Islands	24,742
Balearic Islands	14,744
Catalonia	13,747
Region of Murcia	9,708
Other autonomies	9,564
Community of Madrid	6,650

== Social issues ==
Research has shown that most of the British population in Spain is poorly socially integrated into Spanish society. A survey of 340 British migrants in the Province of Málaga, for example, found that one third rarely or never met Spanish people, apart from in shops and restaurants, and that 60 per cent did not speak Spanish well. A number of initiatives have been launched to improve integration of British migrants into Spanish life, including language course provision. During the Great Recession, some British people in Spain who wanted to return to the UK were unable to do so because of the difficulty of selling property in a depressed local housing market. Figures published in January 2015 showed that 2,973 British nationals were in receipt of unemployment benefits in Spain, paid by the host country. In order to receive an unemployment benefit in Spain, a person must be legally unemployed after making unemployment contributions at least 360 days in the last six years and be registered with the employment authorities as available for work. The unemployment benefit is paid for a minimum of four months and maximum of 24 months, based on the period that the unemployed person has contributed.

== Education ==
There are multiple British international schools located in Spain. The National Association of British Schools in Spain has 52 member schools.

== See also ==
- Demographics of Spain
- Spaniards in the United Kingdom
- British diaspora
- Predicted impact of Brexit
- Spain–United Kingdom relations
