= Instituto Español Vicente Cañada Blanch =

Location
- 317 Portobello Road; London, W10 5SZ; United Kingdom; 51.5205°N 0.2092°W

Information
- Type: Independent school
- Motto: Growing together to achieve international success
- Established: 1982; 44 years ago
- Founder: Vicente Cañada Blanch
- Local authority: Kensington and Chelsea
- Department for Education URN: 100532 Tables
- Education Attaché: Fernando Bartolomé Usieto
- Head teacher: Justina Castillo García
- Gender: Mixed
- Age: 3 to 19
- Enrolment: 416 (2024–2025)
- Capacity: 497
- Language: Spanish
- Color: Red
- Website: vicentecanadablanch.educacion.es

Instituto Español Vicente Cañada Blanch (Vicente Cañada Blanch Spanish School) is a Spanish independent day school, located in Notting Hill, within the Royal Borough of Kensington and Chelsea, London. Owned by the Spanish government, the school operates under the supervision of the Education Office of the Spanish Embassy. Its curriculum is accredited by the Ministry of Education, and it undergoes regular inspections by both the Independent Schools Inspectorate and the Spanish educational inspectorate.

In 2024–25 school year, it had 416 students and an additional 44 in sixth form year.

== History ==
The idea for a Spanish school came from Vicente Cañada Blanch (1900–1993), a Valencia-born businessman and philanthropist who made his fortune in the United Kingdom as a fruit and vegetable importer. Aware of the challenges immigrants face when adapting to a new country, he wanted to create an institution that would support Spanish-speaking families in preserving their language and culture while integrating into British society.

In 1972 Cañada Blanch bought and gifted the Spanish government a property at 151 Charlton Road in Greenwich. However, due to space constraints and a less-than-ideal location, the school relocated in 1982 to its current site on Portobello Road. The new premises had previously served as St Joseph's Convent, a care home for the elderly managed by the Little Sisters of the Poor.

== See also ==
- Spaniards in the United Kingdom
- Spain–United Kingdom relations
