= Leman =

Leman may refer to:

== People ==
- Leman (surname)
- Leman baronets, County of Hertford, England
- Leman Altınçekiç (1932–2001), first female jet pilot in Turkey
- Leman Bozacıoğlu (fl. 2006–2016), Turkish female football referee

== Places ==
- Léman (department), a former département, under the Napoleonic First Empire, France
- Leman, Poland, a village in Podlaskie Voivodeship, Poland
- Léman, a French name for Lake Geneva, in Switzerland and France
- Leman, a town in Kersana Malima, Ethiopia
- Canton of Léman, a canton of the Helvetic Republic from 1798 to 1803

== Education ==
- Collège du Léman, a private, international school in Versoix, Canton of Geneva, Switzerland
- Léman International School - Chengdu, China
- Léman Manhattan Preparatory School, a private school in New York City, New York, U.S.

== Other meanings ==
- LeMan (magazine), a Turkish satirical magazine
- Leman, a Dublin-based rock band involved in RTÉ's 2006 production of You're a Star
- Leman, an archaic word for a man's unmarried (or extramarital) female lover

== See also ==
- Le Mans, a city in France
- Le Mans (disambiguation)
- Mount Leman, a mountain on the border of Alberta and British Columbia, Canada
- Tanjung Leman, a coastal area in Mersing District, Johor, Malaysia
- Lehman (disambiguation)
- Léman (disambiguation)
