= Léman =

Léman may refer to:

== Places ==
- Léman (department), a department of the First French Empire
- Lake Geneva, French: le lac Léman or le Léman
- Canton of Léman, a canton of the Helvetic Republic

== Schools ==
- Collège du Léman, Versoix, Switzerland
- Léman Manhattan Preparatory School, New York City
- Léman International School - Chengdu, China

== Other uses ==
- Léman Express, a commuter rail network in west Switzerland and the French Alps
- Dominique Sébastien Léman, French botanist; named the species Pelagophycus porra

== See also ==
- Leman (disambiguation)
- Leyment a commune in Ain department, France
