= Meritas (education) =

Former network of primary schools

Meritas Family of Schools
- Company type: Private
- Industry: Education
- Founded: 2005
- Headquarters: Northbrook, Illinois, U.S.
- Owner: Sterling Capital Partners
- Website: www.meritas.net

Meritas was a company that operated 10 for-profit college-preparatory schools. The majority of schools are located in the United States, with three additional schools in China, Switzerland, and Mexico. It was owned by Sterling Capital Partners, a private equity company.

== History ==
The company was founded in 2005 by Philip E. Morgaman, who served as chairman and chief executive until 2008 and remained chairman until 2009, when he sold his interest in the company. He was succeeded as CEO by Jonathan (Mac) Gamse and later as chairman by Christopher Hoehn-Saric. At the time of this transition, Meritas had grown from a concept to 19 campuses with approximately 14,000 students. Meritas has purchased multiple schools worldwide. Its first acquisition, in 2005, was North Broward Preparatory School, in Coconut Creek, Florida. Collège du Léman, located in Geneva, Switzerland, was the next school to join the Meritas family in 2006.

As of April 27, 2015, Meritas sold several of their acquired schools to Nord Anglia Education (NAE), including North Broward Prep, Collège du Léman, Léman International, The Village School, Windermere Prep, and Instituto San Roberto. It was unclear whether the remaining Meritas schools would be acquired by NAE.

== Schools and locations ==
- Léman Manhattan Preparatory School located in Manhattan, New York
- Collège du Léman located in Geneva, Switzerland
- Instituto San Roberto two campuses located in Valle Alto (Monterrey) and San Augustín, Mexico
- Lake Mary Preparatory School located in Lake Mary, Florida
- Léman International School located in Chengdu, China
- North Broward Preparatory School located in Coconut Creek, Florida
- Rancho Solano Preparatory School located in Scottsdale, Arizona
- Henderson International School located in Henderson, Nevada
- The Village School located in Houston, Texas
- Windermere Preparatory School located in Windermere, Florida
