= Bacterol Products Company =

Bacterol Products Company was a New York City business which was incorporated during the Great Depression, in February 1930. The firm was located at 25 Broadway. Its incorporation was made with 12,000 shares of common stock.

The organization was headed by Dr. Kurt Erich Schlossingk (1888 – March 13, 1930), a German born physician and chemist. Previously the export manager for the American Drug Syndicate, Schlossingk introduced twilight sleep to the United States in 1914. This was a method of maternity anesthesia induced by morphine and scopolamine. Schlossingk died an untimely death following gallstone surgery at Lenox Hill Hospital.

On February 7, 1930, the Bacterol Products Company announced a capital increase, from the initial 12,000 shares of no par stock, to 41,000. At the end of February 1930, the corporation leased property at 11 East 44th Street. This location was their corporate headquarters.
