= Valle Alto =

Valle Alto (Spanish: "high valley") may refer to:

- Valle Alto (Monterrey) - an exclusive suburb within the city of Monterrey in Mexico
- Valle Alto (La Paz) - name of the main valley of La Paz, Bolivia
- Valle Alto (Cochabamba) - name of a region in the Cochabamba Department, Bolivia
- Valle Alto (Hermigua) - name of the first settlement of Hermigua on La Gomera, Canary Islands
