= Prepa Tec Valle Alto =

Prepa Tec Valle Alto is the newest and smallest of the five Prepa Tec high schools in the city of Monterrey. It was inaugurated in August 2005 with a class of less than 100 students but now has more than 350 students. The school is located in the southern part of Monterrey, in the fast developing Valle Alto region of Mexico. It is situated next to the National Highway on top of a hill.

Prepa Tec Valle Alto is the smallest school by size and by student count in the Prepa Tec High School system; it has fewer than 350 students and 13 classrooms. The school offers the standard Bilingual, Bicultural or International Baccalaureates.

With Prepa Tec getting ready for the fifth generation of students, an expansion is under way; it is next to Aulas II, in which they will expand the gymnasium and make at least eight more classrooms. Work on the expansion started in mid-January 2009.

Prepa Tec Valle Alto is noted for its calm environment, for its cooler weather (due to it being situated on a hill) and for its small class sizes.

== 2018 incident ==
On the morning of September 10, 2018, around 8:30 a.m., local media reported that a young man had been found in one of the bathrooms suffering from a gunshot wound to the head. The young man was identified as Jakob Hartmann Nava, an 18-year-old 5th semester student, who had Asperger syndrome, was suffering from depression and had been transferred from Prepa Tec Eugenio Garza Lagüera to Prepa Tec Valle Alto because he was being bullied by his classmates. This occurred in the context of the World Suicide Prevention Day.
