= The Village School (Houston) =

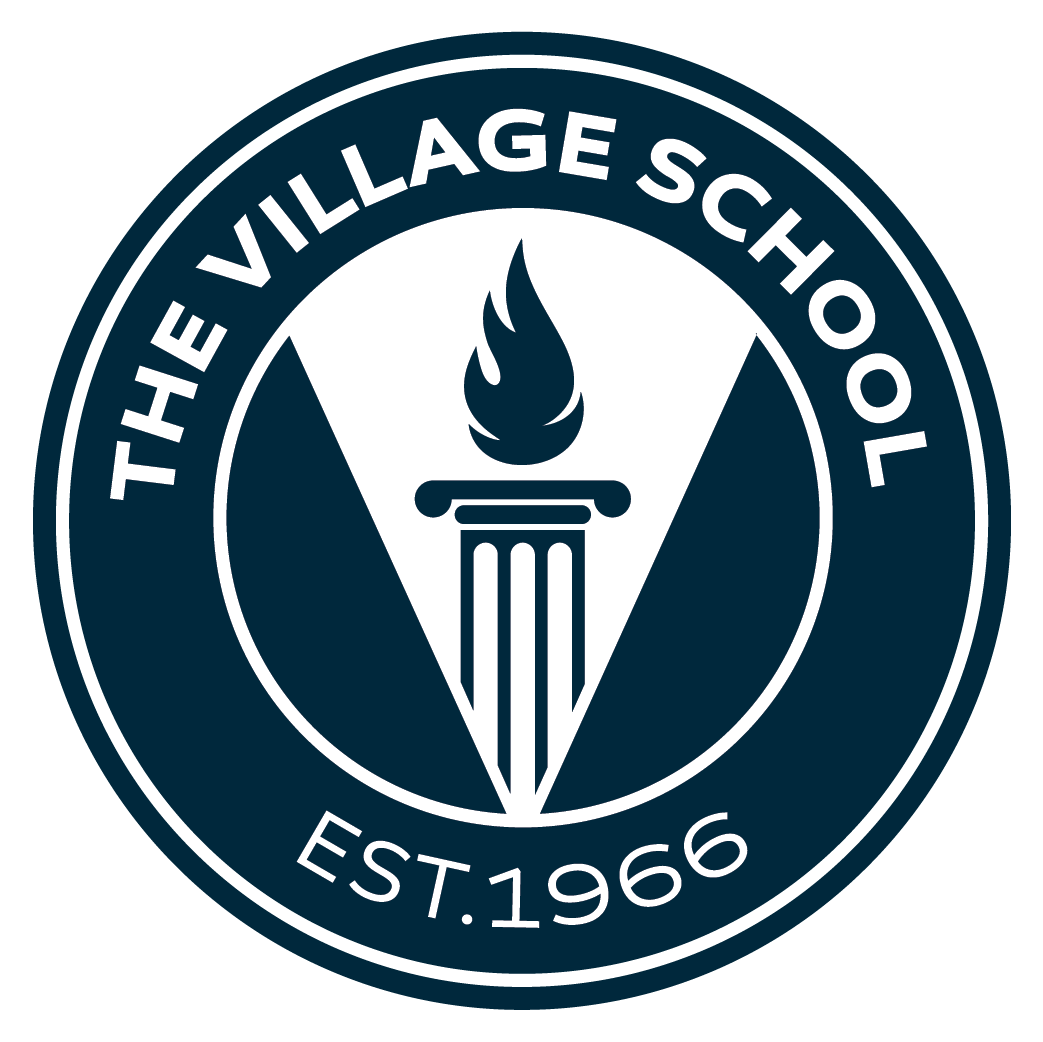

Location
- 13077 Westella Dr; Houston, Texas 77077; United States; 29°44′49″N 95°37′05″W

Information
- Type: Private, boarding
- Motto: Veritas et Scientia (Truth and Knowledge)
- Established: 1966; 60 years ago
- Authority: Nord Anglia Education
- Head of school: Dr. Ryan Kelly
- Teaching staff: 143.3 (FTE) (2017–18)
- Grades: Pre-K–12
- Enrollment: 1,583 (non-PreK) (2017–18)
- Student to teacher ratio: 11:1 (2017–18)
- Campus size: 28 acres (11 ha)
- Colors: White and navy
- Athletics: American Football Cross Country Girls Volleyball Boys & Girls Basketball Boys & Girls Soccer Swim Golf Girls Lacrosse Boys Volleyball Girls Flag Football Tennis Track & Field
- Athletics conference: TAPPS
- Mascot: The Viking
- Affiliation: TAAPS, TAPPS, NAIS, IBO
- Website: www.thevillageschool.com
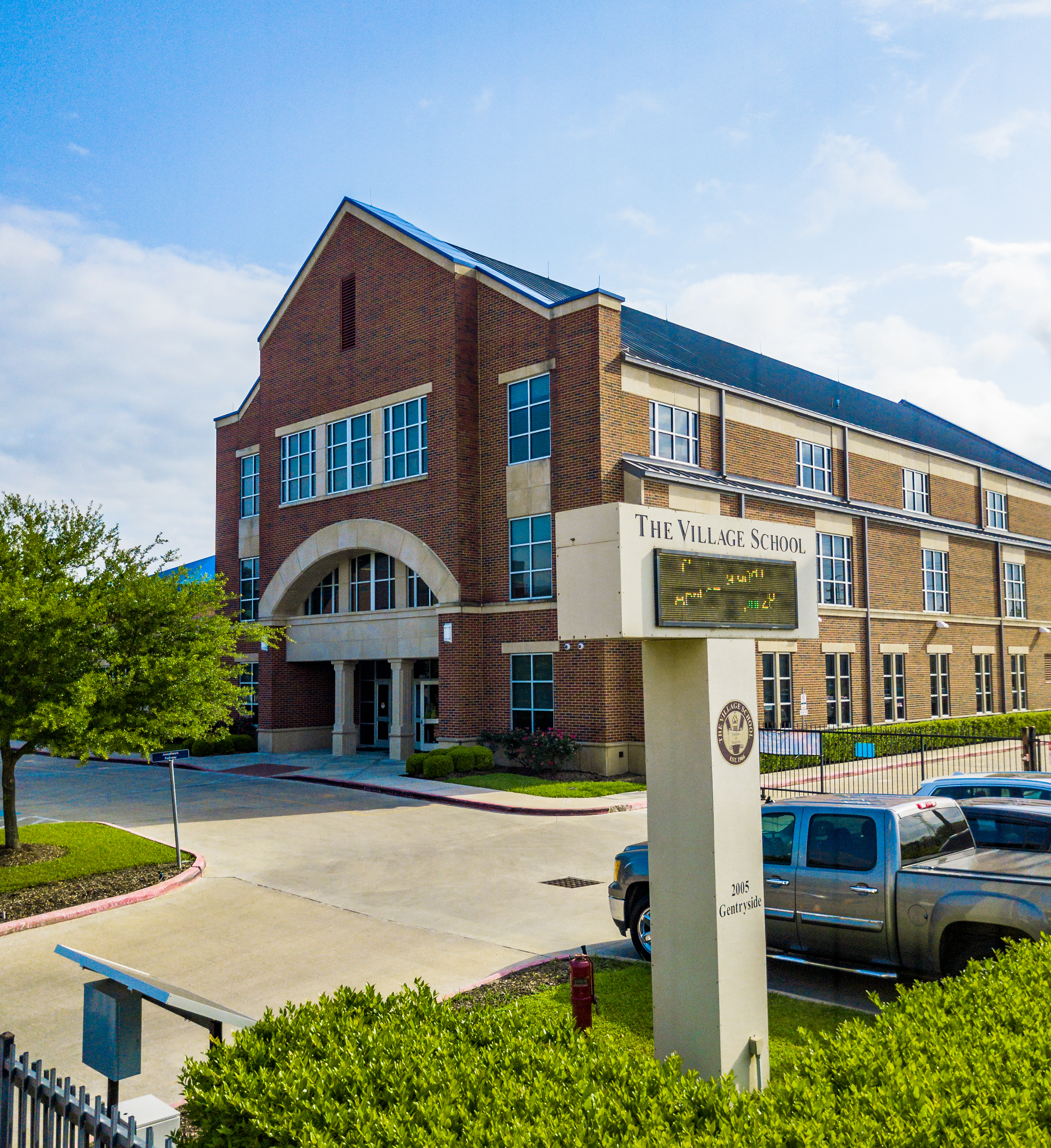

The Village School is a coeducational non-denominational college preparatory private school for grades Pre-K through high school in Houston, Texas.

== Description ==
The Village School is located on over 28 acres in West Houston with over 200,000 square-feet of facilities. The school is fully accredited by the Texas Association of Accredited Private Schools. Village High School is an International Baccalaureate World School. The school has students representing six continents and more than 60 countries.

Students at all grade levels participate in athletics. fine arts, and extracurricular activities.

As of 2018 the head of school is Bill Delbrugge; as of 2021, the school had 1,750 students, making it the largest private school. in the Houston area. The Village School is a part of the Nord Anglia Education network of schools.

== History ==
Founded in 1966, The Village School initially served 100 students, aged three through five. In 1973, Betty Moore acquired the school. In 1981, The Village School moved to a larger campus on Memorial Drive. By 1983, however, the program had expanded to include students from pre-school through grade 4. It then relocated to the current campus on Westella Drive.

In 1984, the first of three new buildings opened, providing space for 25 classrooms, a gymnasium, a stage, a computer room, a music room and a library. The school also added grade 5 and increased their enrollment to nearly 400 students. Grade 6 was added in 1988. The school added grade 7 in 1991 and graduated its first 8th grade class in 1993.

In 2006, The Village School joined the Meritas group of Schools. In 2009, it opened its high school program, with more than 50 9th graders. With each subsequent year, an additional grade was added, reaching grade 12 in the fall of 2012.

In 2014 the school was scheduled to begin developing its 15-acre (6.1 ha) expansion, designed by Ziegler Cooper Architects. and including additional middle school classrooms and area, the Finna Learning Center for early childhood students, a dormitory facility, a science and fine art center, and a student and athletic center building.

In the summer of 2015, the school joined Nord Anglia Education. The new 46,000 square foot athletic center was to include a Varsity athletic gymnasium with a full size collegiate regulation main basketball court and two high school regulation cross courts as well as a natatorium with a 25-yard competition pool.

== Athletics ==
Originally the Village School was not a part of any athletic conference. In 2014 it joined Texas Association of Private and Parochial Schools (TAPPS) and was placed in district 4A. In 2015 the boys' soccer team won the top title of TAPPS division II, giving the school its first-ever statewide athletic title. The boys' soccer team won theTAPPS 4A district title and the TAAPS 4A state championship again in 2016. In 2019, The Village School varsity football team won the TAPPS Division 5 State Championship, the first in the schools history. In four consecutive seasons starting in 2022, the Village eSports team won 1st place in TAPPS League of Legends. In 2023, the boys' soccer team won the top title of TAPPS 6A division 1.

== Transportation ==
As of 2019 the school has multiple bus services: Cinco Ranch, Katy, Lakes on Eldridge, Memorial, Royal Oaks Country Club/Westpark Drive, and Sugar Land. The Westpark stop serves students from Bellaire, Uptown Houston (Galleria area), and West University Place.

== Notable alumni ==
- Erica Dasher (2004), actress
- Max Kerkvliet (2023), professional goalkeeper for Real Salt Lake, and previously The University of Connecticut
- Isaiah Taylor (2012), basketball player who played for the Houston Rockets and Atlanta Hawks
- Lucinda Pastora (2014), Notable Scientist at IFF
