= North Broward Preparatory School =

School in Coconut Creek, Florida, US

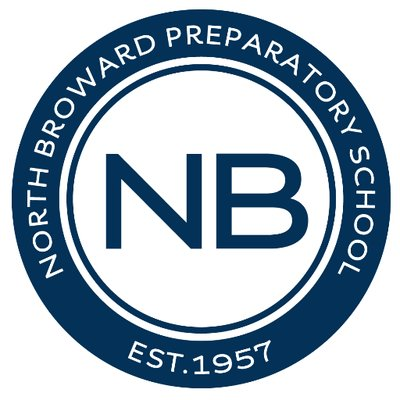

Location
- 7600 Lyons Road; Coconut Creek, Florida 33073; United States; 26°19′34″N 80°10′57″W

Information
- Type: Private international day & boarding school
- Established: 1957; 69 years ago
- NCES School ID: A0102706
- Head of school: Bruce Fawcett
- Teaching staff: 150.0 KG–12 (FTE) (2021–22)
- Grades: PK–12
- Gender: Co-educational
- Enrollment: 1,668 KG–12 (2021–22)
- Student to teacher ratio: 11.1 KG–12 (2021–22)
- Colors: Navy blue; Vegas gold
- Athletics conference: FHSAA; Class: 2B-Dist: 7
- Mascot: Eagles
- Accreditations: Florida Council of Independent Schools; Southern Association of Colleges and Schools
- Tuition: $45,520 (Upper School), $94,125 (international boarding)
- Affiliations: National Association of Independent Schools; Southern Association of Independent Schools; Nord Anglia Education; Florida High School Athletic Association
- Website: nbps.org

North Broward Preparatory School (NBPS) is a PK–12 private, co-educational international day and boarding school in Coconut Creek, Florida, United States. It was founded in 1957 by James Montgomery.

The school was originally located in Lighthouse Point, Florida and relocated to its Coconut Creek location in the summer of 2004.

The school became a member of the Meritas Family of Schools in 2005 and then Nord Anglia Education in June 2015.

Normally, Tuition ranges from $28,750 in Pre-K to $40,900 in High school but Lighthouse Point Academy has a higher tuition ranging from $44,700 in Lower School to $51,400 in High School.

== Accreditation ==
North Broward Preparatory School is accredited by the Florida Council of Independent Schools.

== Athletics ==
The school is a member of the Florida High School Athletic Association.

== Confronting bias class ==
On March 2, 2023, Fox News published an article about the school's graduation requirements, which include taking a single trimester of a class named "Confronting Bias, Working Toward Equity" for students in the Class of 2025 onward. The article includes quotes from a parent of an anonymous student that claimed that students were being told that they were "prejudiced and biased based solely off of the color of [their] skin". The parent was also quoted as saying "I do not understand why, in a state where we overwhelmingly voted to re-elect a governor who is actively fighting this type of Woke ideology, a school with headquarters based out of London, has made this a graduation requirement in the state of Florida."

The "Confronting Bias, Working Toward Equity" class "seeks to raise student’s awareness and give strategies to not only acknowledge their biases and prejudices but to also speak up in situations when biases and prejudices are present. By normalizing and focusing on the study of certain issues through a historical, political, and social lens, we can ensure that our students are learning relevant social sciences skills while also engaging in the vital work of exploring inclusivity, diversity, and confronting bias in their everyday lives." It has not been made clear by the school how these issues will be taught or how they will be studied "through a historical, political, and social lens." In 2022, the school was 94.4% White and 1.1% Black, while the school district was 17.8% White and 38.6% Black.

== Notable alumni ==
- Brandon Doughty (2010), former NFL quarterback
- Ariana Grande (2011), musician and actress
- Sammis Reyes (2014), NFL tight end
- Kevin Austin Jr. (2018), wide receiver for the New Orleans Saints
- Xavier Edwards (2018), second baseman for the Miami Marlins
