= Prepa Tec =

PrepaTec
- Monterrey, Nuevo León; Mexico

Information
- Type: Preparatory school
- Director: Crisantos Manuel Martínez
- Grades: 10-12
- Enrollment: 4500+
- Colors: White & Blue
- Mascot: Borrego (Ram)
- Programs: International Baccalaureate, Mexican Diploma

PrepaTec is a group of high schools located throughout the Monterrey metropolitan area, which branch off from the Tec de Monterrey system. The first high school, Campus Eugenio Garza Sada, was launched in 1975 as a preparation for the university program. Eugenio Garza Sada died shortly before the first school began operations and the campus was named after him.

Students are offered between three study plans: Bilingual, which is directed towards students that still need to improve their English skills, and take that subject as an intensive course, with the remaining subjects in Spanish, Multicultural, in which classes are offered in English and students can take up a third language if they prove their English skills are sufficient through a TOEFL test, or the IB Diploma, which is an educational program developed by the International Baccalaureate Organization recognized around the globe.

== Facilities ==
The following campuses are located in Monterrey:

=== Eugenio Garza Sada ===
Campus Eugenio Garza Sada is one of the first campuses of the Tecnológico de Monterrey. It began operations in August 1975 and is the oldest of the five PrepaTec campuses in Monterrey. It is located about 4 miles west of the city center within the colonia (neighborhood) of Del Carmen, between the districts of Valle and San Jerónimo, in the bank of the Santa Catarina river. The current principal of this campus is Erika Calles Barrón. This school was accredited an International Baccalaureate school in 1991.

This campus has:

- 44 classrooms for 35 students each
- Computer and Learning Space classrooms
- Evaluation Center
- Collaborate-style classrooms with connections to the campus web.
- Library
- Cafeteria
- Cyber Cafe
- Cultural Hall
- Auditorium
- Gymnasium with exercise equipment
- Basketball and volleyball courts
- Handball and tennis courts
- Soccer field
- Softball field
- FIRST Team Botbusters’ 4635 Robotics Workshop

=== Eugenio Garza Lagüera ===
Campus Eugenio Garza Lagüera is located in the southern part of Monterrey City, 10 minutes away from Campus Monterrey. Initially named Preparatoria Eugenio Garza Sada Sur from its foundation until 1989 and later known as Preparatoria Eugenio Garza Lagüera, the school was renamed Campus Eugenio Garza Lagüera in 2001. The current principal of this campus is Julio Cesar Castañeda Cervantes. This school was accredited an IB World School in 2005. This campus has:

- 57 classrooms for 35 students each, equipped to use the most modern technology.
- Library
- Auditorium
- Cafeteria
- 5 Computer Classrooms
- Evaluation Center
- Cultural Hall
- Gymnasium with basketball and volleyball courts
- Gymnasium with exercise equipment
- Aerobics Room
- Jazz & Hip-Hop Room
- Football and Soccer Field
- Softball Field
- Track and Field installations
- Cyber Cafe
- 3 Parking lots
- Innovaction Gym
- FIRST Team VOLTECs' 6647 Robotics Workshop, led by Head Coach Aarón Ruben Luna García

=== Santa Catarina ===
Campus Santa Catarina was inaugurated in 1996, mainly to cover the San Pedro Garza García area. It is located in the district of Santa Catarina, N.L. The current principal of this campus is Jeannie Kukutschka. This school was accredited an IB World School in 2005.

=== Cumbres ===
In August 2001 Campus Cumbres began its operations; it is located in the western part of Monterrey. The current principal of this campus is Oscar Flores Cano. This school was accredited an IB World School in 2005.

This campus has:

- 23 classrooms for 35 students each
- Library
- Evaluation Center
- Computer and Learning Space classrooms
- Cultural Hall
- Gymnasium with exercise equipment
- Aerobics room
- Cafeteria
- Soccer and Football Field
- 4 multi-purpose courts for basketball, volleyball and indoor soccer
- Outdoor terraces in each floor of the building
- Recreational Patios

=== Valle Alto ===
In August 2005 Campus Valle Alto began its operations; it is located in the southern part of Monterrey, serving mainly the Valle Alto and part of San Pedro Garza García communities. The current principal of this campus is Engineer Manuel Gómez Candiani. This school was accredited an IB World School in 2006.

This campus has:

- 25 classrooms for 32 students each
- Library
- Cafeteria
- 2 Computer classrooms
- Gymnasium with exercise equipment
- 2 outdoor basketball courts, which can double as volleyball and tennis courts
- Soccer field
- Evacuation Center
- 2 Parking lots, one atop and one below
- Cultural Hall
