= British International School of Washington =

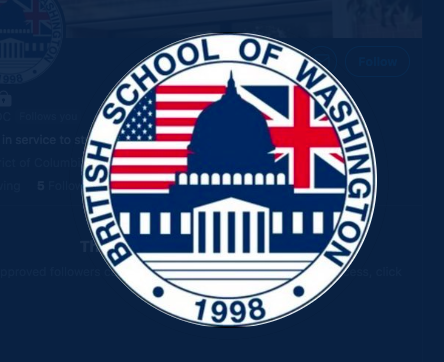
- British International School of Washington

Location
- 2001 Wisconsin Ave NW; Washington, D.C. 20007; United States
- 38°55′1″N 77°4′4″W

Information
- School type: Private
- Established: 1998 (28 years ago)
- Founder: Leslie Stagg
- CEEB code: 090028
- Principal: Oona Carlin
- Grades: Pre-nursery (PK2) to Year 13
- Age range: 2 to 18
- Enrollment: 550
- Capacity: 745
- Accreditation: NEASC, IB, IPC, COBIS
- Website: www.nordangliaeducation.com/bisw-washington

The British International School of Washington (BISW) is a private, nonsectarian, co-educational British school located in the Georgetown neighborhood near the border of the Georgetown and Glover Park neighborhoods in Washington, D.C. BISW educates pupils between the ages of 2 and 18 (UK Pre-Nursery – Year 13 | US Pre-K2 – Grade 12). BISW was originally founded in September 1998 by Dr. Lesley Stagg. In 2013, BISW joined Nord Anglia Education, an international education provider owned by the Canada Pension Plan Investment Board. As of 2019, Nord Anglia operated 66 international schools in 30 countries with over 61,000 students. BISW leases property from Georgetown University, yet GU's Green Building (the physical BISW school building) was purchased in 2009 by the entity that is now HUB Properties Trust.

== Curriculum ==
The Primary School, which includes pre-nursery to year 6 (pre-K-grade 5), offers the International Primary Curriculum (IPC), a curriculum for 2-12 year olds from the National Curriculum for England.

The British International School of Washington offers the International Baccalaureate Diploma Programme (IBDP) for students in years 12 and 13 (US grades 11 and 12), the International General Certificate of Secondary Education (IGCSE) in Years 10 and 11 (US Grades 9 and 10) and the International Middle Years Curriculum (IMYC). IGCSE and IB students take external examinations at the end of years 11 and 13.

== Affiliation and associations ==
The British School claims accreditation from the New England Association of Schools and Colleges Commission on International Education (CIE). BISW is also accredited to offer the International Baccalaureate Diploma Programme (IDBP) and accredited by Fieldwork Education as a Learning-Focused School. The school is a member of the National Association of Independent Schools (NAIS), the European Council of International Schools (ECIS), the Council of British International Schools (COBIS), the Council for International Schools in the Americas (CISTA), and the British American Business Association (BABA).

== See also ==
American schools in the United Kingdom:

- The American School in London
- American School in England
