= Zeng Fanbo =

Chinese basketball player (born 2003)

Zeng Fanbo 曾凡博
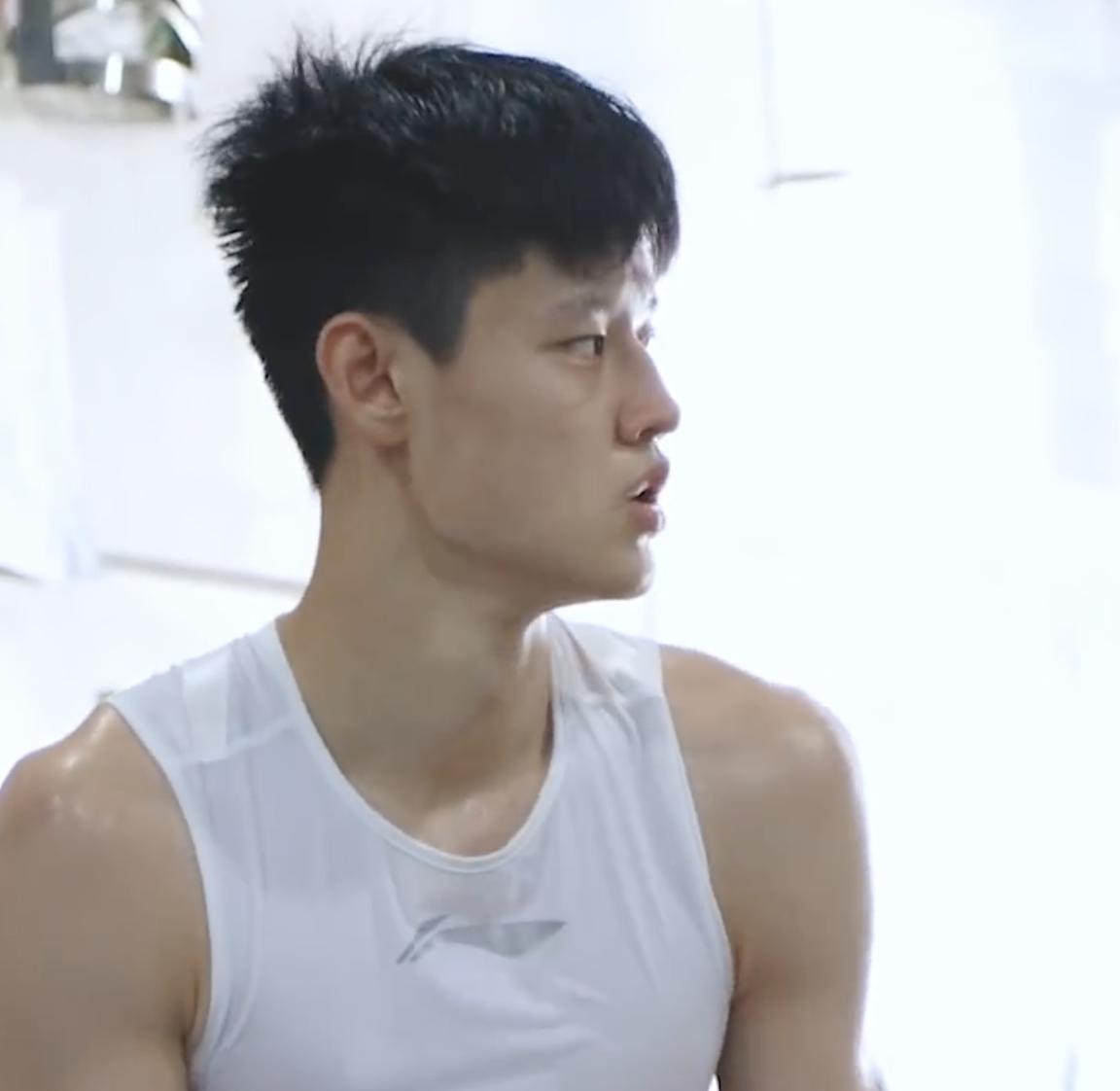
- Zeng in 2020.

No. 7 – Beijing Ducks
- Position: Power forward / small forward
- League: CBA

Personal information
- Born: 11 January 2003 (age 23) Harbin, Heilongjiang, China
- Listed height: 6 ft 10 in (2.08 m)
- Listed weight: 199 lb (90 kg)

Career information
- High school: Windermere Prep (Windermere, Florida)
- NBA draft: 2022: undrafted
- Playing career: 2021–present

Career history
- 2021–2022: NBA G League Ignite
- 2022–2025: Beijing Ducks
- 2025: Brooklyn Nets
- 2026–present: Beijing Ducks

Career highlights
- CBA Defensive Player of the Month; Chinese CBA Honorable Mention 2025; CBA All-Domestic Players Team 2025
- Stats at NBA.com
- Stats at Basketball Reference

Zeng Fanbo (Chinese: 曾凡博; born 11 January 2003) is a Chinese professional basketball player for the Beijing Ducks of the Chinese Basketball Association (CBA). Zeng committed to Gonzaga University in November 2020, but later instead chose to withdraw from his college choice and compete with NBA G League Ignite. Listed at 6 feet 10 inches (2.08 m) and 190 pounds (86 kg), he plays the power forward and small forward positions. At the high school level, he played for Windermere Preparatory School in Windermere, Florida. Zeng was a consensus four-star recruit.

== Early life and high school career ==
Zeng was born in Harbin in the Chinese province of Heilongjiang. At age eleven, he joined the youth program of the Beijing Ducks. For his freshman year of high school, Zeng moved to the United States, enrolling at Windermere Preparatory School in Windermere, Florida. As a sophomore, he averaged 15.5 points, 7.2 rebounds and 2.6 blocks per game, earning Class 3A All-State first team honors. He returned to China after the season and was unable to rejoin the team in his junior season due to COVID-19 travel restrictions. He also bypassed his senior year.

=== Recruiting ===
Zeng was a consensus four-star recruit and was considered "China's top basketball prospect" by The Athletic. On November 21, 2020, he committed to playing college basketball for Gonzaga over offers from Florida State, Florida and Virginia Tech, among others. On April 24, 2021, he decommitted from Gonzaga with the intention of joining the NBA G League Ignite, in part because of the departure of assistant coach Tommy Lloyd, who had recruited him to Gonzaga.

College recruiting
Name	Hometown	School	Height	Weight	Commit date
Fanbo Zeng; PF	Harbin, China	Windermere Prep (FL)	6 ft 11 in (2.11 m)	190 lb (86 kg)	—
Fanbo Zeng; PF	Recruit ratings: Rivals: 247Sports: ESPN: (88)				
Overall recruit ranking: 247Sports: 73 ESPN: 33
Note: In many cases, Scout, Rivals, 247Sports, On3, and ESPN may conflict in their listings of height and weight.; In these cases, the average was taken. ESPN grades are on a 100-point scale.; Sources: "2021 Team Ranking". Rivals.

== Professional career ==
=== NBA G League and signing with the Brooklyn Nets (2021–2025) ===
On October 13, 2021, Zeng signed with the NBA G League Ignite of the NBA G League.

On June 25, 2022, Fanbo Zeng signed an Exhibit 10 contract with the Indiana Pacers and joined the team for the 2022 NBA Summer League.

On August 2, 2025, Zeng signed an Exhibit 10 contract with the Brooklyn Nets. It was announced on X by Michael Scotto of The Athletic. Zeng played in one preseason game against the Phoenix Suns. In his game, he played ten minutes and recorded one steal in a loss to the Phoenix Suns, with the score being 132-127. Zeng was later waived on October 15.

=== Return to Ducks (2026–present) ===
After being waived from the Brooklyn Nets, it was announced on December 19, 2025, that Zeng had agreed to sign a three-year contract extension with his former team, the Beijing Ducks.

== National team career ==
Zeng was expected to represent China at the 2020 FIBA Under-17 Basketball World Cup in Sofia, but the event was postponed due to the COVID-19 pandemic.
