= British Vietnamese International School =

Private bilingual school in Vietnam

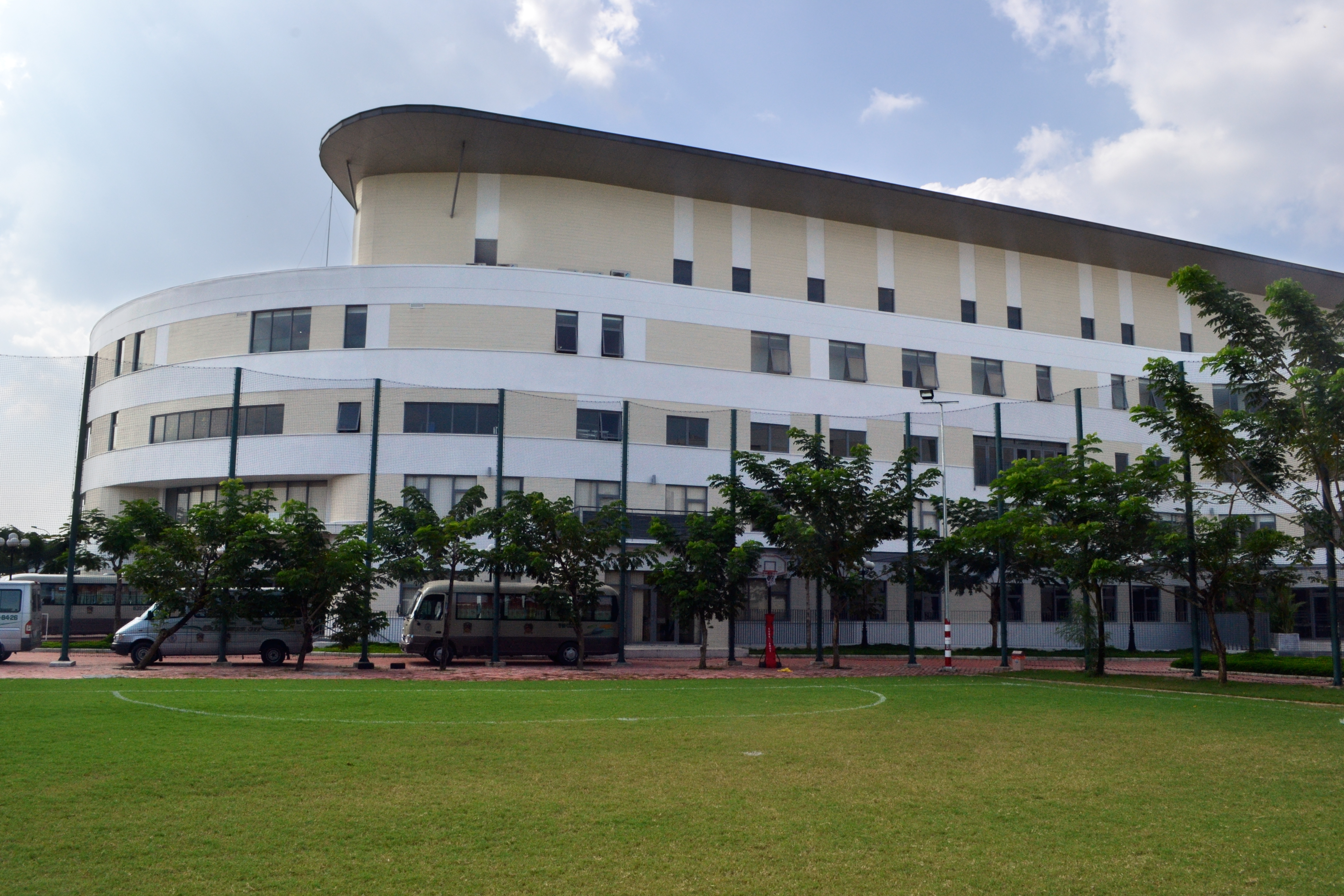
- BVIS Ho Chi Minh campus, seen from the soccer field

Location
- Ho Chi Minh City and Hanoi; Vietnam
- Coordinates: 10.7210°N 106.6846°E

Information
- Type: Private dual-language international school
- Established: August 2011 (Ho Chi Minh City) and August 2012 (Hanoi)
- Principal: Simon Higham
- Grades: F1 - Y13
- Website: bvisvietnam.com

British Vietnamese International School in Ho Chi Minh City, commonly referred to as BVIS HCMC, is an international school in Vietnam, that is fully accredited by the Council of International Schools (CIS). The school is also a member of the FOBISIA group of schools, and is part of the Nord Anglia Education Group.

BVIS educates children at preschool, primary and secondary level. The school uses the English National Curriculum with modules from the Vietnamese curriculum that are believed to be particularly strong: Vietnamese Literature, History and Geography.

== History ==
BVIS was officially established in August 2011 after the success of its sister school the British International School which was established in 1997.

== School Facilities ==
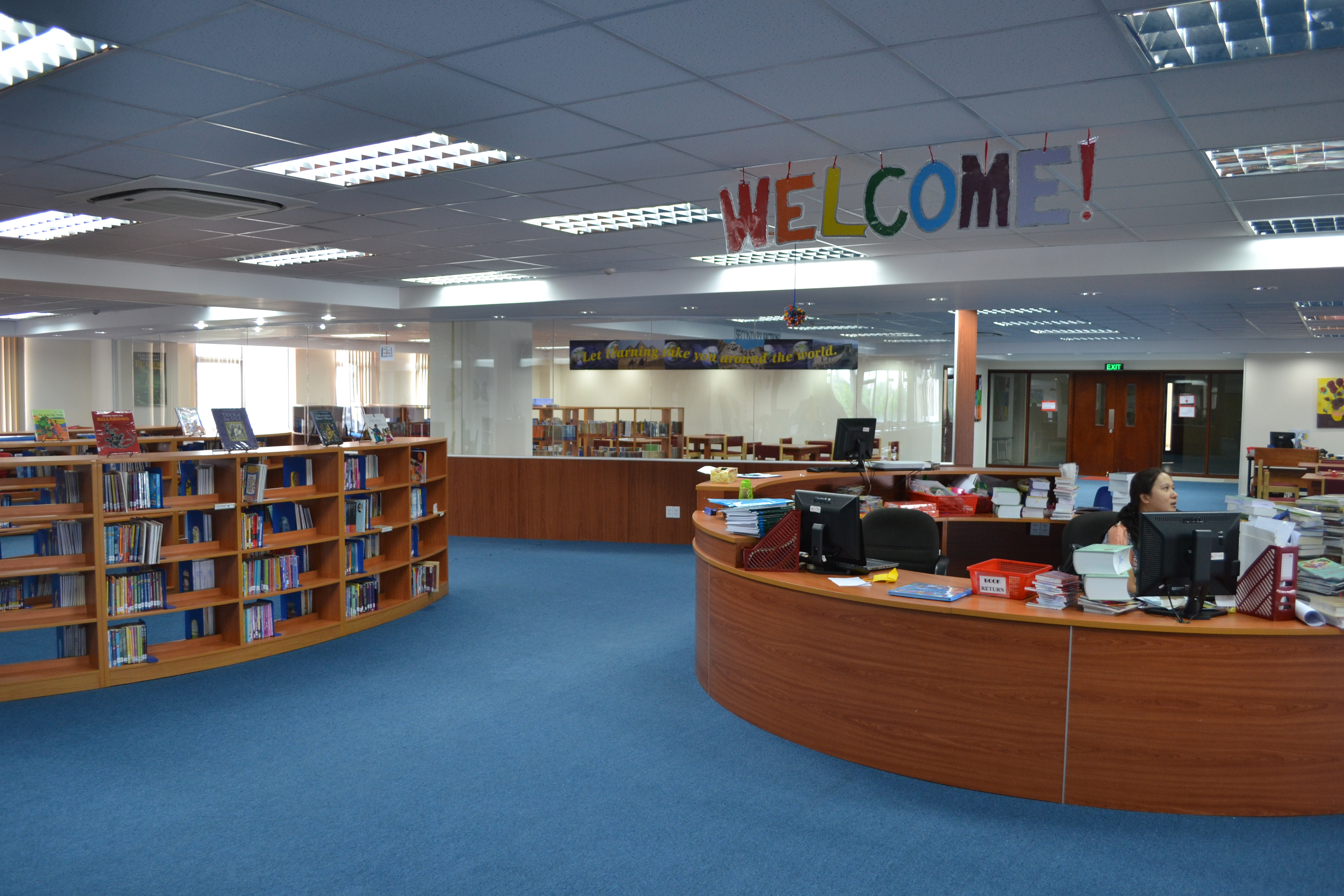
The BVIS Ho Chi Minh library

BVIS HCMC is a purpose-built school. It has an "early years" soft play area, 2 swimming pools, a library with 56,400 books, a modern lecture theatre, a number of dance, music and drama studios, an auditorium, a sports hall and a grass playing field, amongst other facilities. All classrooms are equipped with interactive whiteboards and data projectors.

BVIS HCMC is an international school in Vietnam, that is fully accredited by the Council of International Schools (CIS) and Western Association of Schools and Colleges (WASC). The school is also a member of the FOBISIA group of schools, and is part of the Nord Anglia Education Group - the world's largest premium school's group.

BVIS HCMC offers an international environment to its students and seeks to develop a global mindset amongst them, whilst embracing the Vietnamese language and Vietnamese cultural values and traditions. The school has a unique licence in Vietnam that allows it to offer an international curriculum (English National Curriculum, international GCSEs and A Levels) in a bilingual environment.

BVIS educates children at preschool, primary and secondary level. The school uses the English National Curriculum with modules from the Vietnamese curriculum that are believed to be particularly strong: Vietnamese Literature, History and Geography. The school's students graduate with international GCSE and A Level qualifications, which are accepted by all of the leading universities in the world.

== History ==
BVIS was officially established in August 2011 after the success of its well-known sister school British International School which was established in 1997.

== Curriculum ==
=== Curriculum Offered ===
The BVIS curriculum is based on the National Curriculum of England but has been adapted to provide education in both English and Vietnamese. The curriculum is divided into 5 Key Stages from Early Years Foundation Stage to Secondary.

- Age 2-4: British Early Years Foundation Stage Framework
- Age 5-10 (Lower to Upper Primary) the National Curriculum of England and the International Primary Curriculum within the learning context of Vietnam
- Age 11-13 (Key Stage 3): the National Curriculum of England
- Age 14-16 (Key Stage 4): the International General Certificate of Secondary Education
- Age 17-18 (Key Stage 5): the International A Level programme

=== Academic Qualifications ===
- International A Levels
- International AS Levels
- International GCSEs

=== Student Academic Achievement ===
- 100% A Level pass rate for the Class of 2021
- The percentage of students achieving A*-C grades, including English and Math at IGCSE is 89% in 2021

== See also ==
- International school
