= English International School Prague =

School in Prague, Czech Republic

Location
- Prague 4, Prague; Czech Republic; 50°0′20.14″N 14°27′7.01″E

Information
- Established: 1995
- Owner: Nord Anglia Education
- Principal: Mel Curtis
- Age: 2 to 18
- Website: EISP Website at the Wayback Machine (archive index)

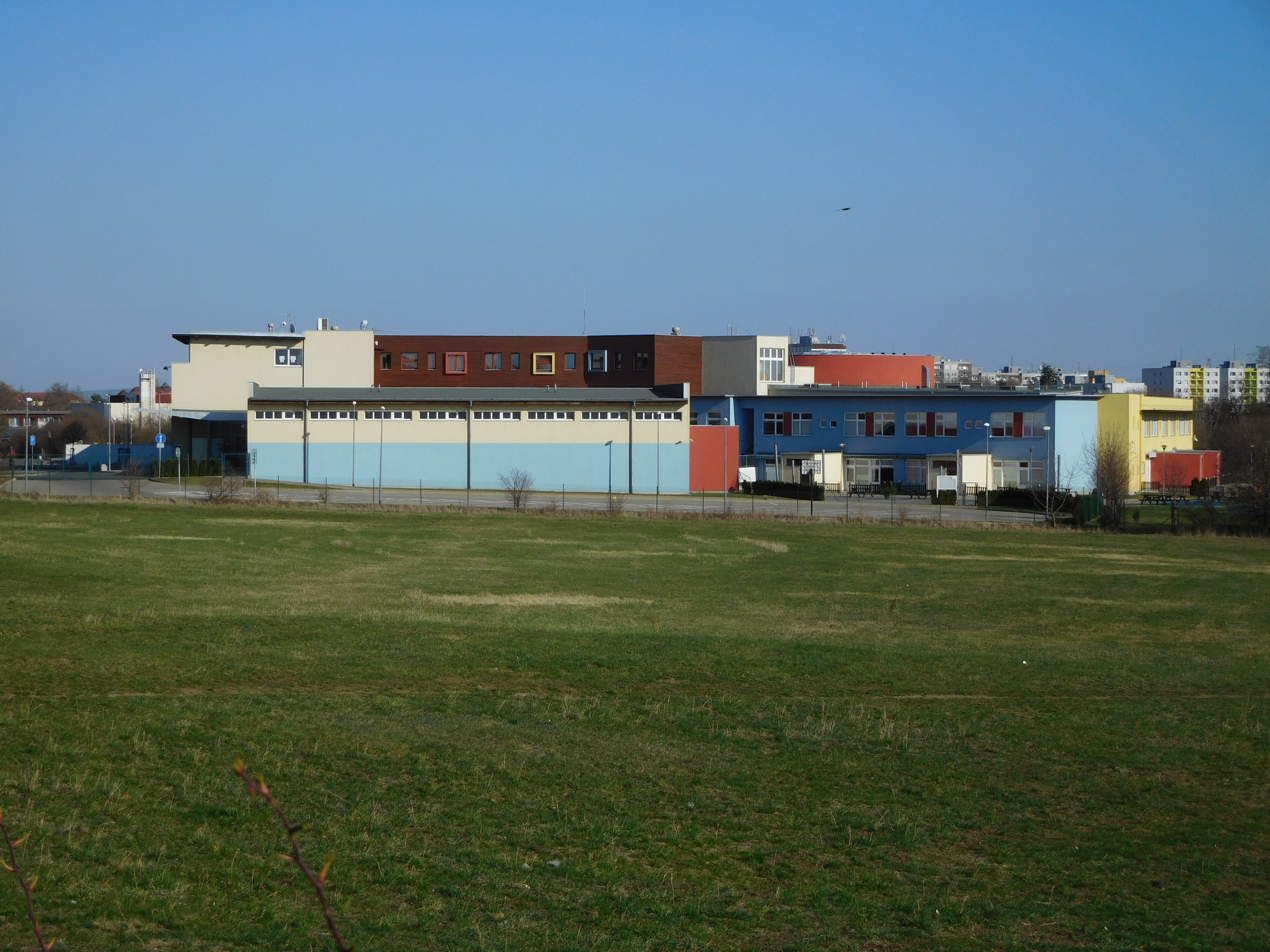
Brunelova 12 - Libuš campus of PBIS

The English International School, Prague (EISP) was a fee-paying, international day school for pupils 2–18. The school followed the English curriculum and the teaching staff were primarily trained in the UK.

It merged into the Prague British International School as of September 2018.

== History ==
The school was founded in 1995. It was previously in Na Okruhu 395, Prague 4. Its final Prague 4 campus, Libuš campus at Brunelova 960/12, opened in 2007. This campus, now a part of the British International School of Prague, has a 6,782-square-metre (73,000 sq ft) building on a 18,029-square-metre (194,060 sq ft) plot of land.

In 2015, Nord Anglia Education announced a global collaboration with The Juilliard School to enrich performing arts education in its schools. The English International School Prague became one of ten pioneering schools to begin embedding this collaboration in its performing arts teaching, commencing in September 2015.

== Curriculum ==
The school uses the National Curriculum of England, and offers IGCSEs at 16 and the IB Diploma (International Baccalaureate Diploma) at 18. The English International School Prague has a small teacher to pupil ratio. It is owned by Nord Anglia Education, which runs 43 schools internationally, educating more than 34,000 students in 15 countries.

== Notable alumni ==
- Mikolas Josef (born 1995) – singer, songwriter, model
