= Léman Manhattan Preparatory School =

Coordinates: 40.7058°N 74.0111°W

Location
- 41 Broad Street (Lower) New York City; New York 10004; United States

Information
- Type: Private, Day & Boarding School, College Prep, International boarding
- Established: 2005
- Head of school: Maria Castelluccio
- Faculty: 130
- Grades: PreK2–12
- Gender: Co-educational
- Enrollment: 750 (2016–17)
- Student to teacher ratio: 6:1
- Affiliations: Meritas (education); Léman International School; Middle States Association of Colleges and Schools
- Website: lemanmanhattan.org

Léman Manhattan Preparatory School is a private school located in the Financial District, Manhattan. Students are ages two years old through eighteen years old. There are two Lower Manhattan sites.

Founded in 2005 as Claremont Preparatory, the school was acquired by the Meritas family of schools in 2011, and subsequently renamed to Léman Manhattan Preparatory School. Several Meritas schools such as Collège du Léman which locates in Switzerland and Léman International School Chengdu which locates in China have incorporated the name Léman.

In 2011, Léman joined Meritas, an international network of college preparatory schools. In 2015, Léman Manhattan was left out of a transaction that took in Léman Switzerland, and Léman Chengdu, and did not become an affiliate school of Nord Anglia Education as part of an acquisition deal. Nord Anglia currently maintains two other schools in Manhattan, Nord Anglia International School New York (ages 2–14) and the other school Avenues New York (ages 1–18) neither of which have an on site boarding facility.

Léman Manhattan Preparatory School has students from over seventy countries. Tuition for K-12 day students and the boarding tuition is listed on their website.

== Curriculum ==
Léman Manhattan offers the International Baccalaureate (IB) Diploma.

== Campus ==
Léman Manhattan's lower school is based at the former headquarters of Bank of America International at 41 Broad Street in the Financial District of Manhattan, New York City. and was the original campus. The middle and high school campuses are located nearby in the Cunard Building at 1 Morris Street, and opened in 2010.

Both locations have amenities including swimming pools, art studios, libraries, gyms, music rooms, cafeterias and fine arts performing spaces. The lower school has a rooftop playground.

== International boarding ==
Léman Manhattan is the only high school in New York City with a residential boarding program. In 2012, the school opened its boarding program, with forty students from nine countries in grades 9–12 in its inaugural program. In 2015, Léman had over 100 students participating in its boarding program.

Student housing is located at 37 Wall Street, an apartment building blocks away from the Upper School Campus. Students in the boarding program reside in apartments, with rooms accommodating 2-4 people with a kitchen.

== Accreditation ==
Léman Manhattan Preparatory School is an independent, non-sectarian school. The school is accredited until 2031, by the Middle States Association of Colleges and Schools.
