= Windermere Preparatory School =

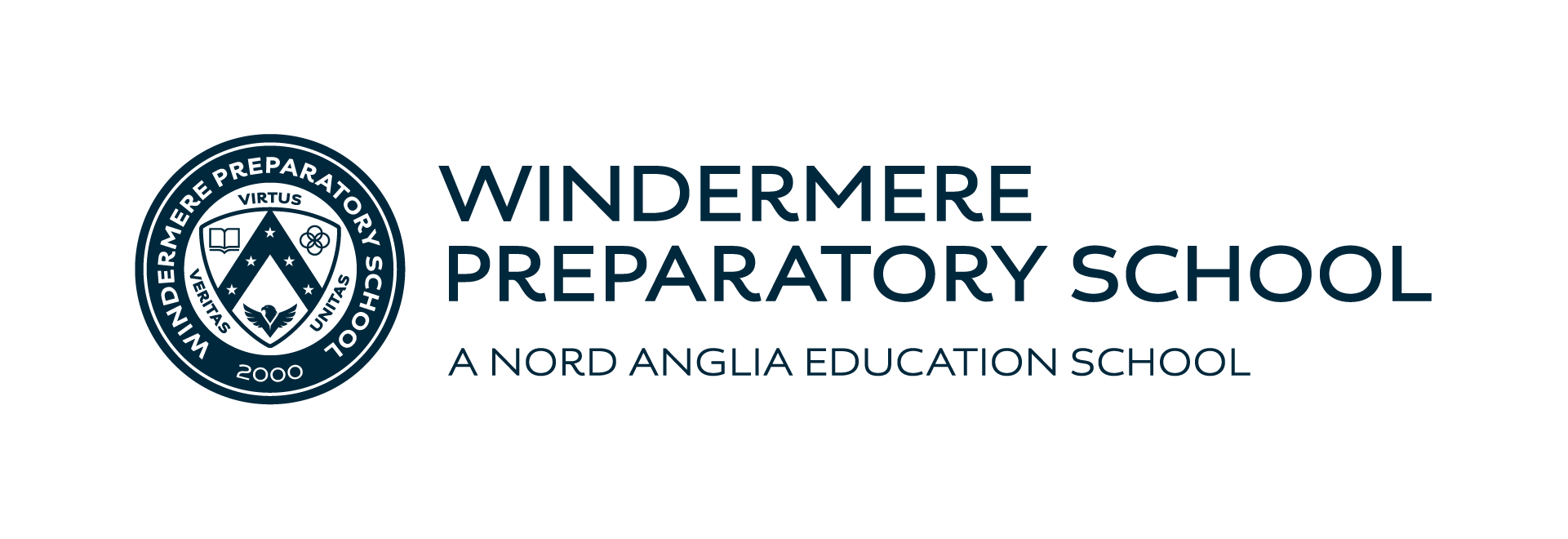

Location
- Lake Butler, Orange County, Florida; United States
- 28.477222°N 81.568333°W

Information
- Type: Private, coeducational
- Motto: Veritas, Virtus, Unitas
- Established: 2000
- Head of school: Mr. Alex Birchenall
- Faculty: 120
- Enrollment: 1,800 (PK–12)
- Campus: Urban, 48 acres (190,000 m^{2})
- Colors: Red, White, and Blue
- Mascot: Lakers
- Tuition: $26,990 (1–5), $29,500 (6–8), $31,500 (9–12)
- Website: windermereprep.com

Windermere Preparatory School is a private, coeducational, PK–12 college preparatory school in Lake Butler, an unincorporated area in Orange County, Florida, United States, within the Orlando metropolitan area. Established in 2000 and in proximity to the Town of Windermere, it is accredited by the Southern Association of Colleges and Schools, Southern Association of Independent Schools, Florida Council of Independent Schools, and International Baccalaureate World School. It is a part of the Nord Anglia Education network.

== History ==
The school opened on September 5, 2000, using temporary classrooms, with an enrollment of 184 students and 25 teachers. Today, that enrollment has grown to 1,520 students including day and boarding on a 48-acre (190,000 m^{2}) campus on Lake Cypress.

Presently, WPS employs over 160 faculty and staff.

In 2016 it was sold to Nord Anglia Education. In 2021, the school reported 1,800 students.

== Notable alumni ==
- Zeng Fanbo, professional basketball player
