= Leman Bozacıoğlu =

Turkish football referee

- Full name: Leman Aksoy Bozacıoğlu
- Other occupation: Teacher

Domestic
Years	League	Role
2013-2015	Women's Second	referee
2014-	A2	referee
2014-	Regional Amateur	referee
2015-	Women's First	referee

Leman Aksoy Bozacıoğlu (born Leman Bozacıoğlu) is a Turkish female association football referee. She is a school teacher from profession.

== Private life ==
Bozacıoğlu moved in 2014 to Antalya from Istanbul. She lives in Gazipaşa district of Antalya, where she serves as a teacher of physical education.

She is married to a military officer. The couple is parent of a child.

== Sports career ==
=== Football referee ===
Bozacıoğlu decided to pursue a referee career following an advice of her trainer as she played football in the school team in 2006.

She began her referee career in a men's Regional Amateur League match as the assistant referee in 2013. The same year, she was appointed to officiate a Youth League, and a Women's Second League match in the referee position. After serving in the referee role in A2 League and Regional Amateur League matches, she debuted in the Women's First on November 15, 2015.

During her referee career, she served two seasons in Istanbul, two in Antalya, one in Niğde, two in Şırnak and then in Northern Cyprus before she settled in Antalya.

In 2014, she was named "Best Referee of the Year" in the women's football category by a local media.

In 2016, Bozacıoğlu served as the fourth official in a friendly test match between the German teams SV Wehen Wiesbaden and Hannover 96 in Belek, Antalya.

=== Athletics trainer ===
Bozacıoğlu is a 3rd-class certified trainer for athletics.
