= Cunard Building (New York City) =

Office building in Manhattan, New York

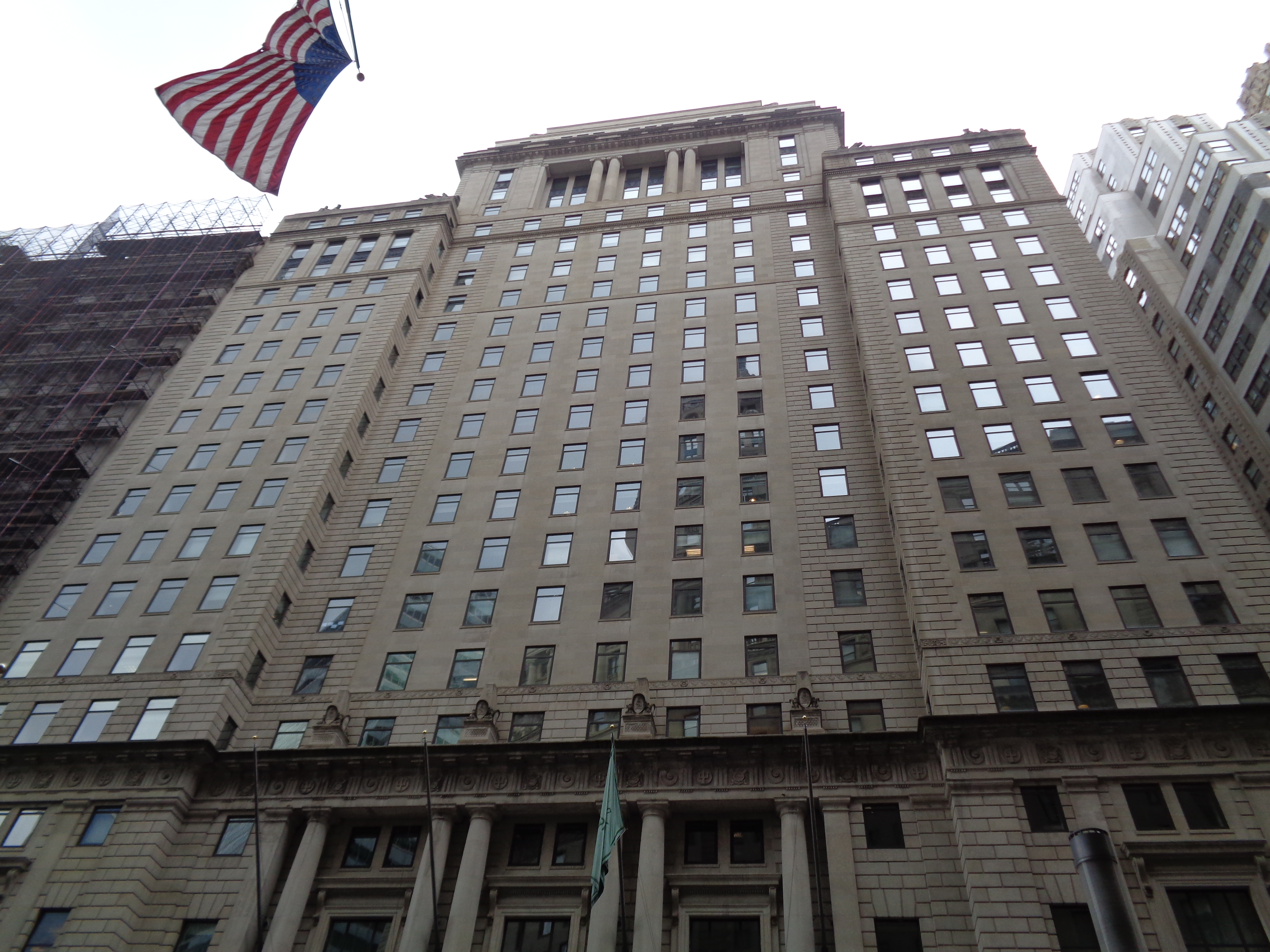
- Interactive map of the Cunard Building area
- Alternative names: Standard & Poors Building

General information
- Status: Completed
- Type: Office
- Architectural style: Neo-Renaissance
- Location: 25 Broadway; Financial District, Manhattan, New York
- Coordinates: 40°42′21″N 74°00′51″W
- Construction started: 1920
- Completed: 1921
- Opened: May 2, 1921
- Client: Cunard Line

Height
- Height: 254.74 feet (77.64 m)

Technical details
- Floor count: 22 (+1 basement)

Design and construction
- Architect: Benjamin Wistar Morris III
- Architecture firm: Carrère & Hastings

New York City Landmark
- Designated: September 19, 1995
- Reference no.: 1928 (exterior); 1929 (interior)

U.S. Historic district – Contributing property
- Designated: February 20, 2007
- Part of: Wall Street Historic District
- Reference no.: 07000063

The Cunard Building, formerly the Standard & Poors Building, is a 22-story office building at 25 Broadway, across from Bowling Green Park, in the Financial District of Lower Manhattan in New York City. The Cunard Building was designed in the Italian Renaissance style by Benjamin Wistar Morris, in conjunction with consultants Carrère & Hastings. The Cunard Building's facade and principal first-floor interior spaces are New York City designated landmarks, and the building is also a contributing property to the Wall Street Historic District, a National Register of Historic Places district created in 2007.

The Cunard Building's main facade, on Broadway, is made of limestone and consists of three horizontal sections. The design employs setbacks and open "light courts" as mandated by the 1916 Zoning Resolution. The structure was designed around an irregular street grid and is located directly above a subway line that crosses the building site diagonally. The first floor interior contains an elaborately decorated lobby, as well as a similarly opulent Great Hall, which extends 185 feet (56 m) with a 65-foot-tall (20 m) dome. The remaining floors contain various offices and school spaces.

The Cunard Building was erected for the New York City office of British steamship operator Cunard Line; construction started in 1920 and the building was completed the next year. Upon completion, the Cunard Building's exterior and interior designs received critical acclaim, and the building was almost fully leased to tenants in various industries. The Twenty-five Broadway Corporation, a Cunard Line affiliate, owned the building until the 1960s. The Great Hall was vacated after the Cunard Line moved out in 1968; the United States Postal Service occupied the Great Hall from 1974 until 2000, and Cipriani S.A. started using the space in 2014. The upper floors continued to host offices and various educational facilities.

== Site ==
The Cunard Building is a 22-story building, bounded by the Bowling Green Offices Building (11 Broadway) and 1 Broadway to the south, Broadway to the east, Greenwich Street to the west, and Morris Street to the north. It is located across from Bowling Green Park to the southeast, and 26 Broadway and the Charging Bull sculpture to the east. While 25 Broadway is considered to be its primary address, it is also known as 13–27 Broadway, 13–39 Greenwich Street, and 1–9 Morris Street. The Cunard Building has a frontage of 203 feet (62 m) along Broadway, 231 feet (70 m) along Greenwich Street, and 248 feet (76 m) along Morris Street. Due to the irregular street grid of the area, none of its corners are at right angles.

The Cunard Building was one of several structures built on the lower section of Broadway in the early 20th century that would be affiliated with the maritime trade. It was also one of several corporate headquarters to be constructed at the southern end of Broadway during the early 20th century.

== Architecture ==
The Cunard Building was largely designed by Benjamin Wistar Morris. The massing and facade were devised by Carrère and Hastings, while exterior detail was created by Rochette & Parzini. The structure was laid out so that ancillary structures such as smoke stacks, penthouses, and storage tanks could not be seen from the side. Its location near ferry slips, the New York City Subway, elevated Interborough Rapid Transit lines, and the Hudson & Manhattan Railroad's Hudson Terminal made the Cunard Building desirable to tenants. In the 1970s, the Cunard Building became known as the Standard & Poors Building, after its tenant Standard & Poor's, though the name also came to refer to nearby structures. (Note: The Standard & Poor's Building may refer to 65 Broadway or 55 Water Street.)

=== Form ===
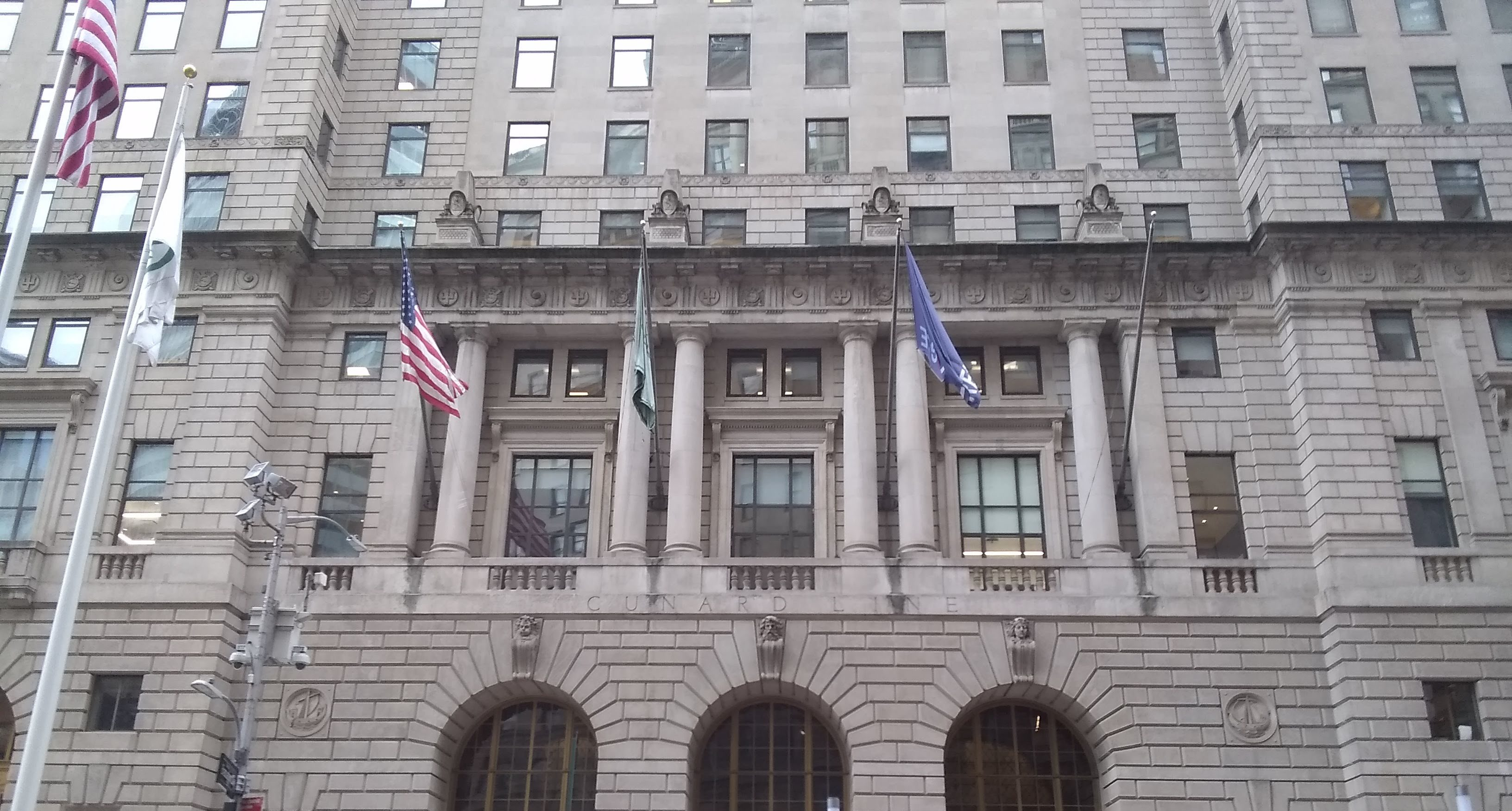
Eastern facade seen from across Broadway

The building is H-shaped, with "light courts" facing north toward Morris Street and south toward the Bowling Green Building. The "light courts" are located above the base. The placement of these courts allowed light to enter the Great Hall, located on the first floor. According to Morris, the irregular street grid of the neighborhood made it difficult to determine the orientation of the building; he finally decided on its current north–south alignment since, at the time, it would have been possible to see the North River (now the Hudson River) to the south.

At the time of the Cunard Building's construction, large buildings in New York City were being erected in a "C" or "H" shape to maximize illumination of the interior space. Additionally, the 1916 Zoning Resolution necessitated the inclusion of setbacks on buildings in New York City that were above a certain height. The Cunard Building was the first large structure built in the city after the end of World War I, and set an example for compliance to the 1916 law. Because of the presence of large intersections on either side of the building (Bowling Green to the east and the intersection of Greenwich Street and Trinity Place to the west), the required setback under the 1916 zoning law was minimal.

=== Foundation ===
The New York City Subway's BMT Broadway Line (carrying the R and W trains) crosses diagonally underneath the Cunard Building from northwest to southeast. Two additional subway lines, the IRT Lexington Avenue Line (4 and 5 trains) and the IRT Broadway–Seventh Avenue Line (1 train), run adjacent to the western and eastern boundaries of the building, respectively. The Lexington Avenue Line's Bowling Green station is located directly under the building's boundary, while the Broadway Line's Whitehall Street station is located one block south. Because of the subway tunnels in the area, the Cunard Building's foundation was built around the subway.

During construction, the engineers considered and rejected an idea for placing the Cunard Building's girders on the roof of the Broadway Line tunnel, since that would have resulted in vibrations every time a subway train passed by. Furthermore, the subway tunnel was designed to support the weight of several small buildings and might not have been able to support one large building. Instead, engineers decided to place the building's foundation columns on either side of the subway tunnel, and then erect girders for the building above the tunnel's roof. The foundation columns were placed as close to the subway tunnel as possible, in order to reduce the length of the trusses, which would have had to carry heavy loads. All of the foundation columns were sunk to the depth of the rock underneath.

A cofferdam was then built on the eastern border of the site, and on part of the northern border. The rock surface underneath the building site was closer to the ground on the western side of the lot, requiring extensive excavation. On the eastern side of the lot, the rock surface sloped below the elevation of the subway tunnel. A 6-foot-thick (1.8 m) wall was built on the southern boundary of the Cunard lot, of which a 2-foot (0.61 m) width was located under the Bowling Green Offices Building. The wall served several purposes: it closed the cofferdam, underpinned the subway, and provided support for the columns on the southern side of the Cunard Building.

=== Facade ===
==== Broadway elevation ====
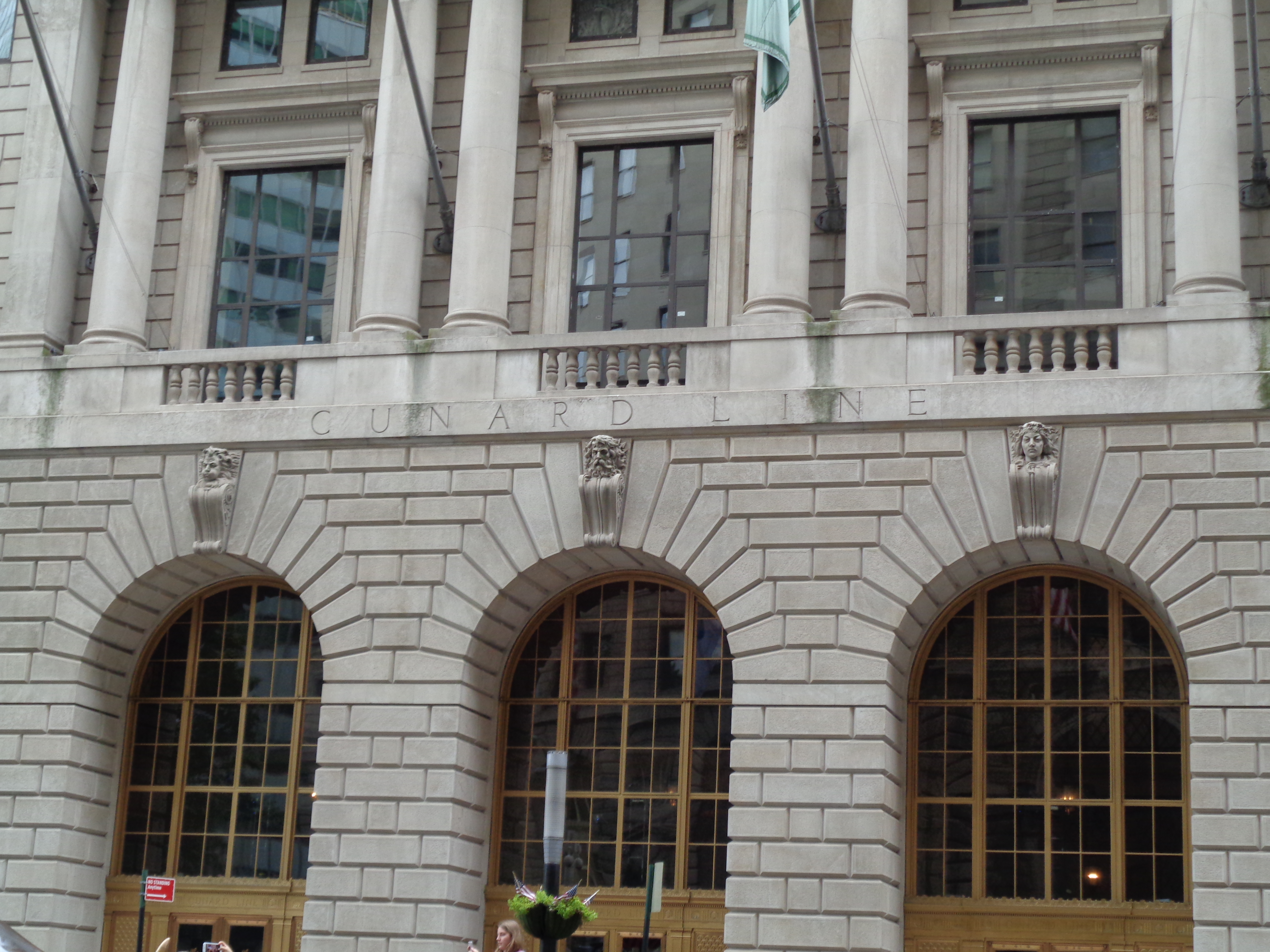
Center arches at the base

The facade of the Broadway elevation is made of Indiana Limestone, making the Cunard Building part of a masonry "canyon" on lower Broadway. It is divided horizontally into three sections; one author described the juxtaposition of these sections as "stacked classical compositions". The outermost portions of these facades consist of pavilions that project outward, while the central pavilion is set back 5 feet (1.5 m). The projecting pavilions on either side rise to the maximum height allowed under the 1916 law. On the Broadway facade, the side pavilions are 50 feet (15 m) wide, while the central pavilion is about 103 feet (31 m) wide.

The Broadway elevation contains decorative elements that signify the area's historic connections with the maritime industry. These include "nautically-inspired sculpted elements", decorative keystones above the first-floor arches, decorative ship-themed roundels above the third-floor loggia, and carvings of seahorses with their riders above the pavilions' setbacks.

Within the four-story base, the central section is recessed slightly. The first floor contains five double-height arches, set within rusticated masonry, facing Broadway. The rusticated arcade is designed in a manner similar to that of 16th-century Italian villas. The center three arches, within the recessed central pavilion, lead to the Great Hall; the southernmost arch leads to the elevator lobby for the office space above; and the northernmost arch led to a banking area on the north side of the building. All the arches contain doors and windows with bronze frames. The third and fourth floors contain an Ionic-style loggia structure supported by Tuscan-style column pairs. Above the base, the facade is mostly composed of smooth limestone, except for rustication around the fifth story windows. The columns of windows around the central pavilion, which is recessed further, are also set within a rusticated facade. The outer pavilions are set back beyond the 18th story to comply with the 1916 Zoning Resolution. The central pavilion contains a loggia between the 19th and 21st stories, also supported by Tuscan-style column pairs, and includes a mansard roof above the 22nd story. The roofs of the outer pavilions, above the 22nd story, are flat.

==== Other elevations ====
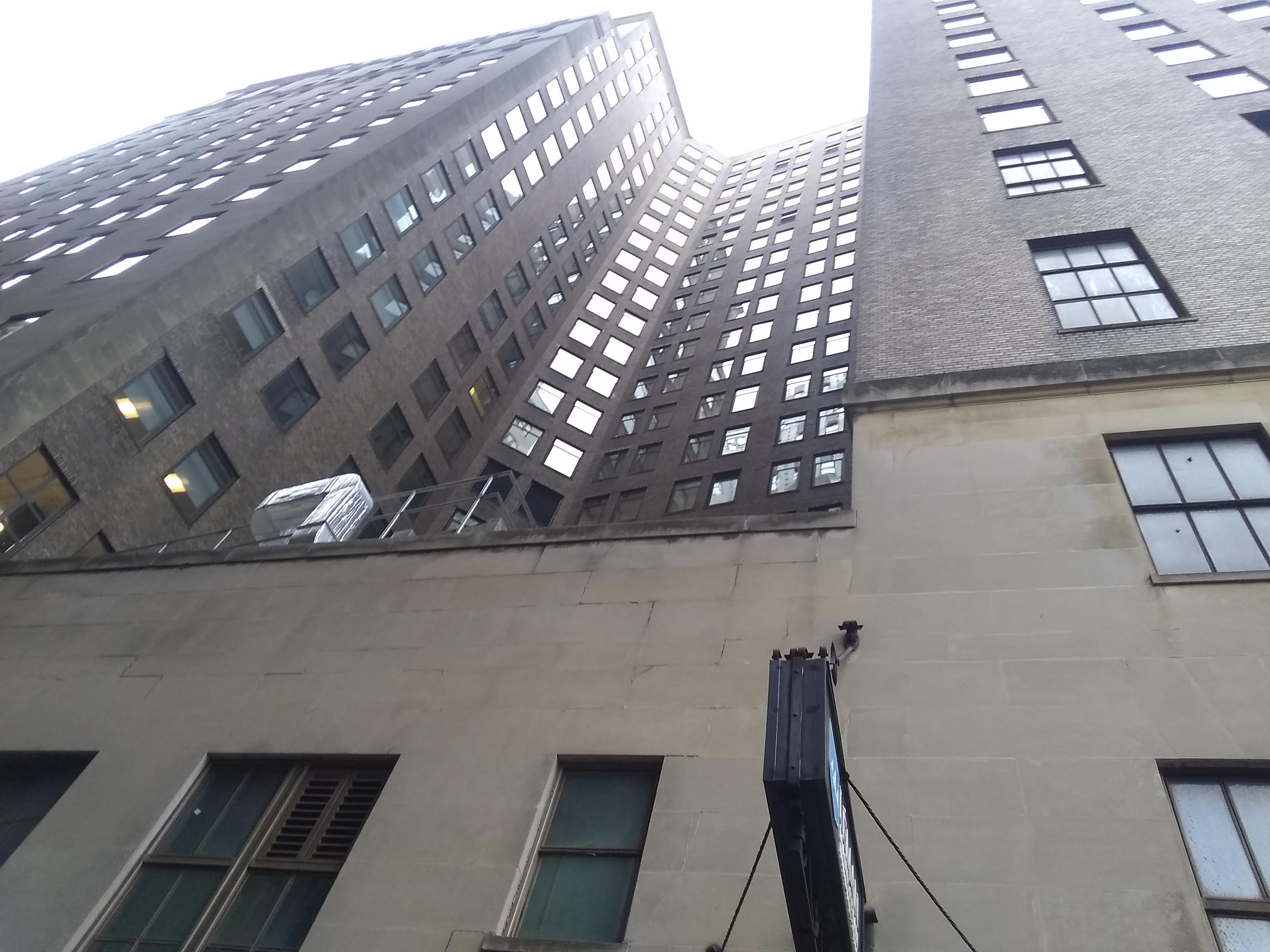
Morris Street facade, looking up at the light court, which is faced mostly in brick. The section at far left, closest to Broadway, is faced with limestone

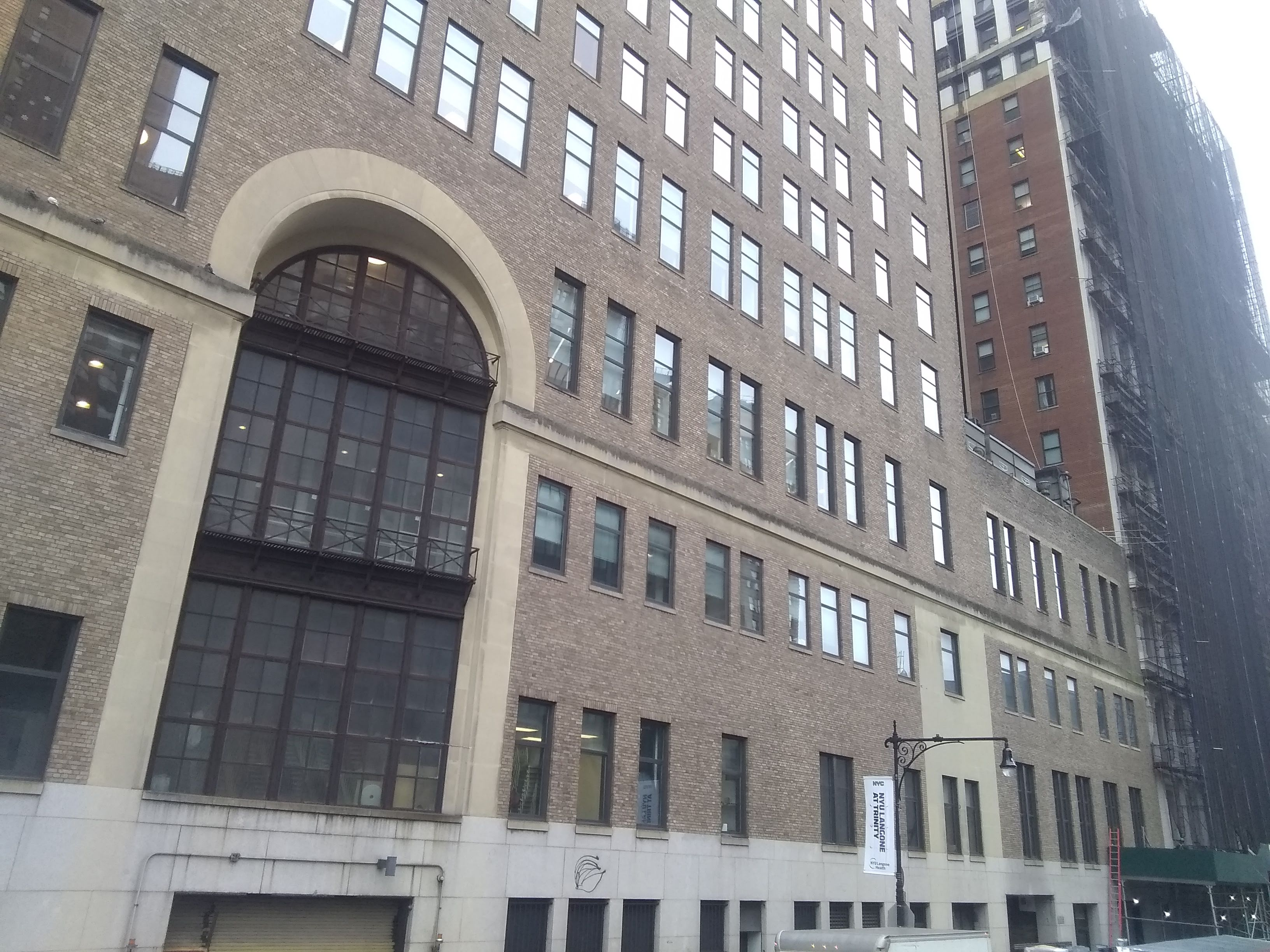
Greenwich Street facade, with the triple-height window recessed at an angle. Below is the full-height basement, faced with granite

On Morris Street, the first and second stories are faced with limestone, while the basement is faced with a water table made of granite. Above the second story is a light court. The facade of the eastern wing (facing Broadway) is limestone, while the rest of the Morris Street facade is made of tan brick. There are also numerous glazed doors with bronze frames, as well as glazed paneled windows with metal frames. The remaining windows on Morris Street are sash windows.

On Greenwich Street, the basement is faced with granite and the remaining stories are faced with tan brick. The basement contains service doors, a garage door, and metal window openings. Above the garage door is a large triple-height arched window on the first through third floors, with balconies on the second and third floors; the window is recessed at an angle. The remaining windows on Greenwich Street are sash windows. There is a cornice of stone above the 22nd floor. The southernmost section of the Greenwich Street facade only goes to the third floor to allow light to enter the light court within the southern side of the building. The gray brick at both Morris and Greenwich Streets was designed to "harmoniz[e] closely with the limestone".

The south elevation consists of a brick facade with sash windows. The light court faces south toward the Bowling Green Offices Building.

=== Interior ===
At opening, the Cunard Building featured over 700,000 square feet (65,000 m^{2}) of space, of which 500,000 square feet (46,000 m^{2}) was made available for tenants when it opened. A basement in the building contained a safe-deposit vault. The building's superstructure was fireproof. According to data collected by The Real Deal magazine, the precise floor area of the Cunard Building is 809,401 square feet (75,195.8 m^{2}). The first floor contains numerous elaborate works of art.

The building also contained 36 elevators: 33 for passengers and 3 for freight. Of the passenger elevators, 28 were "high-speed" elevators for general use and the remaining 5 were private cabs. The elevators were clustered in the northwestern and eastern parts of the building. Twenty of the "high-speed" elevators were local and express elevators, accessible from the elevator lobby at the southern end of the Broadway facade. The other eight were located at the building's northwest corner, near Greenwich and Morris Streets.

==== Lobby ====
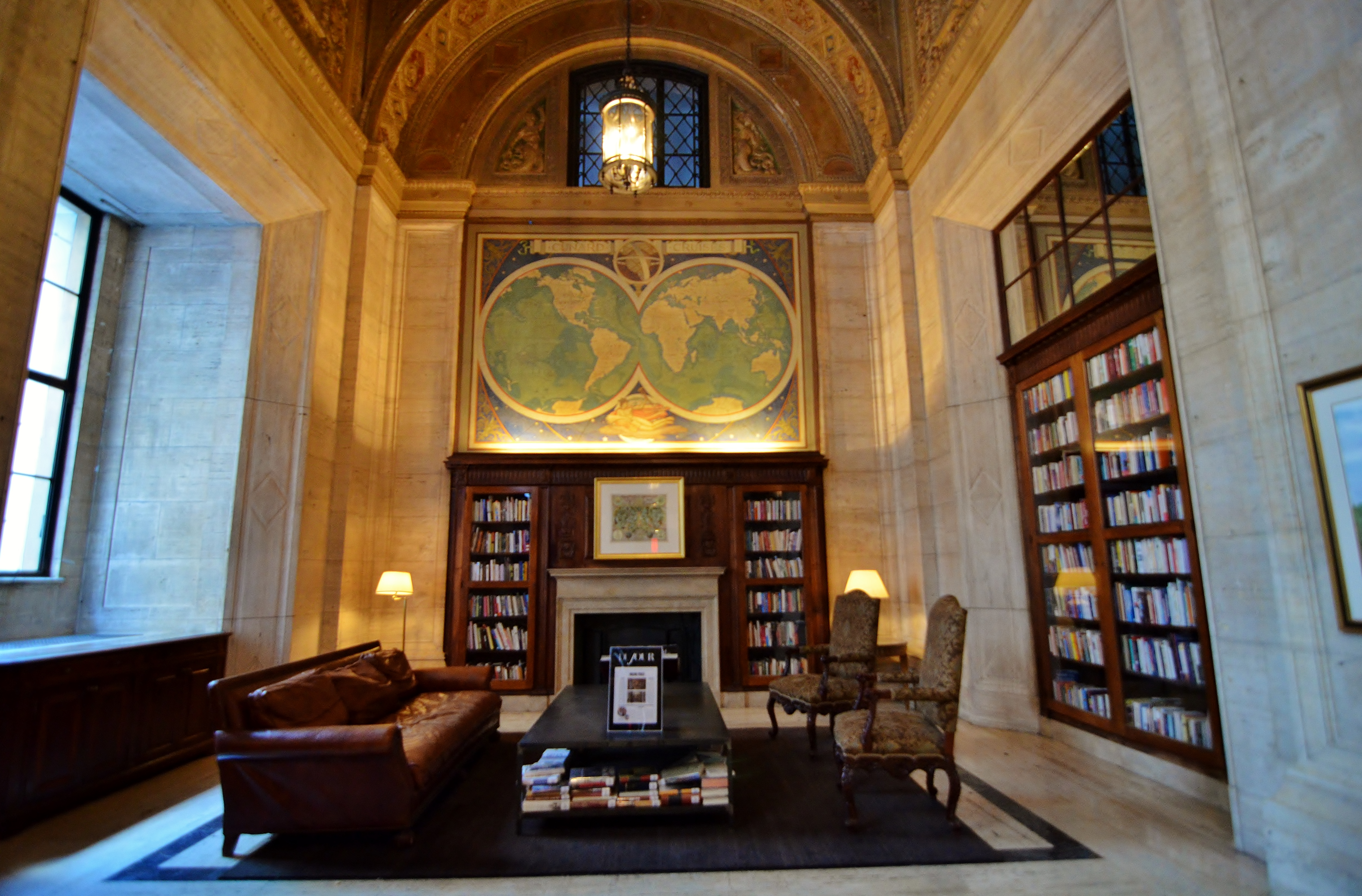
Lobby

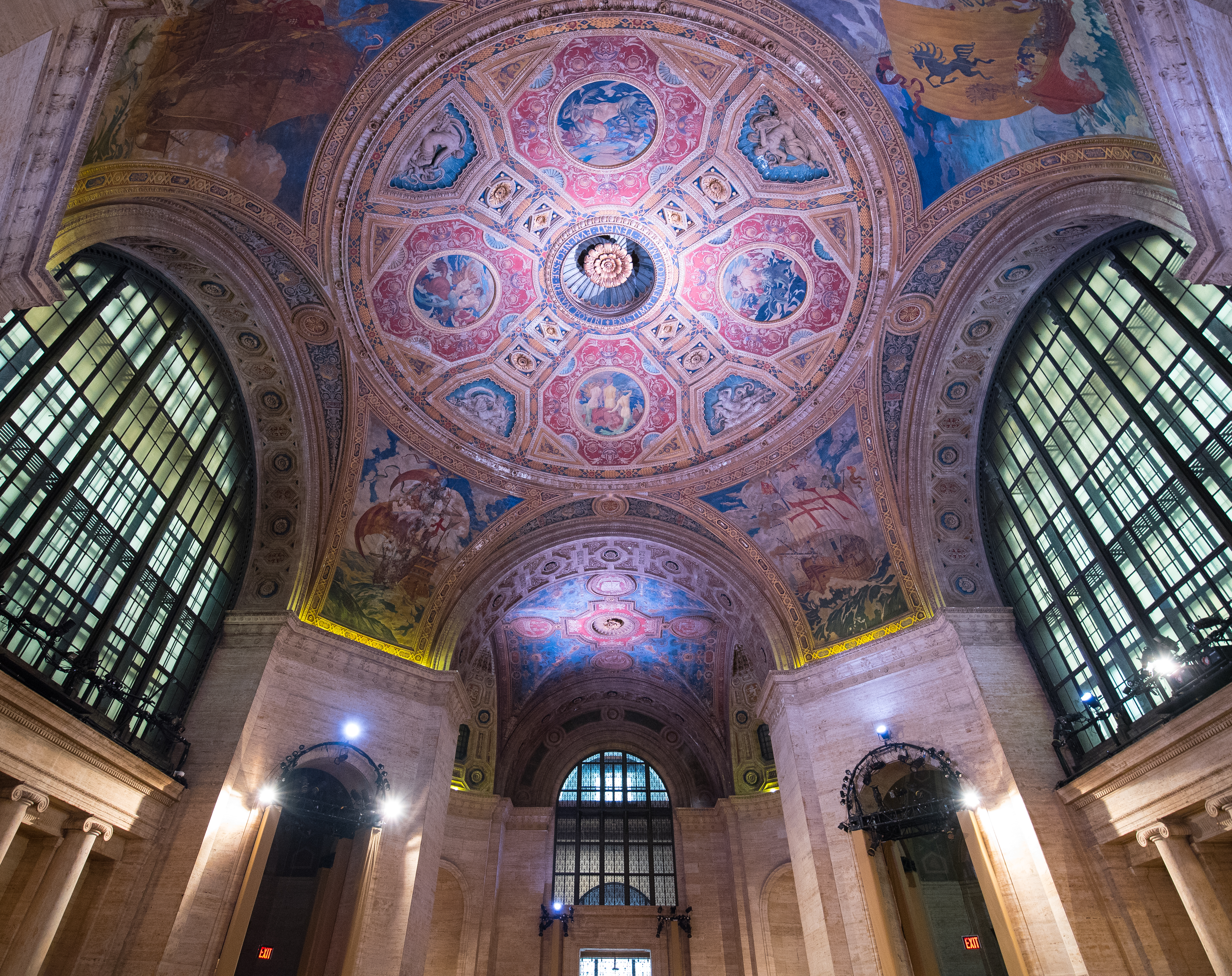
Great Hall

The main entrance is from Broadway, through the three center arches, each of which contains a small entrance vestibule inside. The vestibules and the two outer arches all lead to the building's main lobby. The lobby contains a ceiling of five groin vaults, each of which correspond to one of the arches on the Broadway facade. The floors are made of travertine with marble trim and contain maritime-themed bronze medallions. The walls are also made of travertine; there is a fireplace on the southern wall and a roll-down gate and doors on the northern wall. A passageway runs along the western wall of the lobby, connecting the northern four bays to the Great Hall to the west. The building's original owners had decided against putting "miscellaneous minor business adventures" in the lobby, such as newsstands, shoe-shine stands, and cigar shops.

The lobby ceiling was painted by Ezra Winter and sculpted by Carl Jennewein, and contains decorations of marine animals and children. The lobby's end bays also contain bas-reliefs carved by Jennewein. Wrought-iron screens topped by lunette grilles, designed by Samuel Yellin, separate the passageway from both the lobby to the east and the Great Hall to the west.

The north side of the first floor contained a banking area, which had a private elevator to the fourth floor and a basement-level bank vault. This was initially occupied by a branch of the Mechanics and Metals National Bank.

==== Great Hall ====
The Great Hall extends about 185 feet (56 m) from east to west (Note: Abramson 2001, p. 130, gives a slightly different length of 187 feet (57 m).) and is about 74 feet (23 m) wide. It contains several Beaux-Arts design elements, including a symmetrical plan, transverse axes, a central dome, and various walled-off areas. The features are reminiscent of Roman bathhouses, and the treatment of the artwork resembles that at the Villa Madama's loggia in Italy. During the building's design process, Thomas Hastings of Carrère and Hastings had recommended using the Villa Madama as an inspiration for the Great Hall's shape. When completed, the Great Hall was described as "the largest of its kind" in the United States and was compared to the waiting rooms of railroad terminals. One source described the Great Hall as being the "size of a six-story building covering nearly six city lots".

It includes three separate vaults. The central vault is 65 feet (20 m) tall with a diameter of 70 feet (21 m). There are large arched windows or "luminary squares" at the ends of its diagonal axes, under which are Ionic columns. Flanking the main dome are two spaces with rectangular rib vaults, which extend the hall to the west and east. There are additional arched openings through the west and east walls of the Great Hall: the former leads to a window facing Greenwich Street, while the latter leads to the lobby. As built, the hall was overlooked by wrought-iron balconies on the east wall, designed by Yellin. When the Great Hall was in operation, there were counters for ticket sales, as well as waiting lounges with wood paneling. The different sections of the Great Hall were known as the Freight Distribution Hall and the Bill of Ladling Hall.

The ceiling of the Great Hall contains maritime-themed frescoes, which Winter painted using the fresco-secco method. These murals depicted maritime activity and, according to Winter, depicted "the age-old romance of the sea or the lure of travel". Barry Faulkner painted murals of maps into the walls of the Great Hall's niches, depicting the routes operated by the Cunard Line. The pendentives of the Great Hall's dome include depictions of oceanic explorers Leif Erikson, Christopher Columbus, Sebastian Cabot, and Francis Drake. On the Great Hall's floor is a marble compass surrounded by a bronze frieze, designed by John Gregory as an "allegory of the sea".

==== Upper stories ====
Each of the office floors consisted of about 48,000 square feet (4,500 m^{2}) of space, though the actual rentable space on each floor ranged from 20,000 to 30,000 square feet (1,900 to 2,800 m^{2}). Because of the H-shaped design, all offices had access to windows. In addition, the offices were divided by glass partitions, which allowed managers to observe workers and "see that the occupant of no desk is idle". The Cunard Line's executive offices were placed immediately above the main entrance. The offices also had a library, which one source described as containing the "dignity and comfort of old England".

The top four floors have since been converted for use by the Léman Manhattan Preparatory School, which uses a side entrance at 1 Morris Street. The school space contains a cafeteria; 30 classrooms; a library; a 400-seat auditorium; and a 40,000-square-foot (3,700 m^{2}) athletic complex with a gym, swimming pool, and rock climbing wall.

== History ==
The site of the Cunard Building was occupied by Dutch houses after the colony of New Amsterdam was founded in the 17th century. In 1846, the site became a hotel and restaurant operated by Joseph and Lorenzo Delmonico. This later became a hotel called the Stevens House, which was popular among shipping and mercantile industry figures. By the 1900s and 1910s, the "Stevens House" name applied to two 5-story buildings at the corner of Broadway and Morris Street. According to a 1910 photograph, the buildings on 13-27 Broadway were largely commercial and included a restaurant, art publishers, the Anchor Line steamship company, hatters, and the Stevens House. Meanwhile, the lots facing Greenwich and Morris Streets contained Manhattan Railway Company's lost-property building and the late vice president Aaron Burr's former house.

The Cunard Line, for whom the Cunard Building was constructed, was one of the preeminent British transatlantic steamship companies of the 19th century. Its New York City office, which opened in 1846, had always been situated in or around Bowling Green. After moving several times, the Cunard Line sought "an adequate and permanent American headquarters" by the 1910s. Benjamin Wistar Morris started planning for a new office building for the Cunard Line by August 1917, before the site had even been purchased. His preliminary plans called for a grandiose ticket lobby for Cunard's ticket offices and a smaller elevator lobby for tenants of the upper floors. Despite subsequent modifications to the draft, the two separate lobbies remained in the final plan. The individual lots comprising the future Cunard Building were then purchased by the Irons & Todd real-estate firm, which then formed the Todd, Irons & Robertson, Inc. construction company. Irons & Todd eventually hoped to turn over the land to the Twenty-Five Broadway Corporation, a subsidiary headed by an official for the Cunard Line.

=== Construction ===
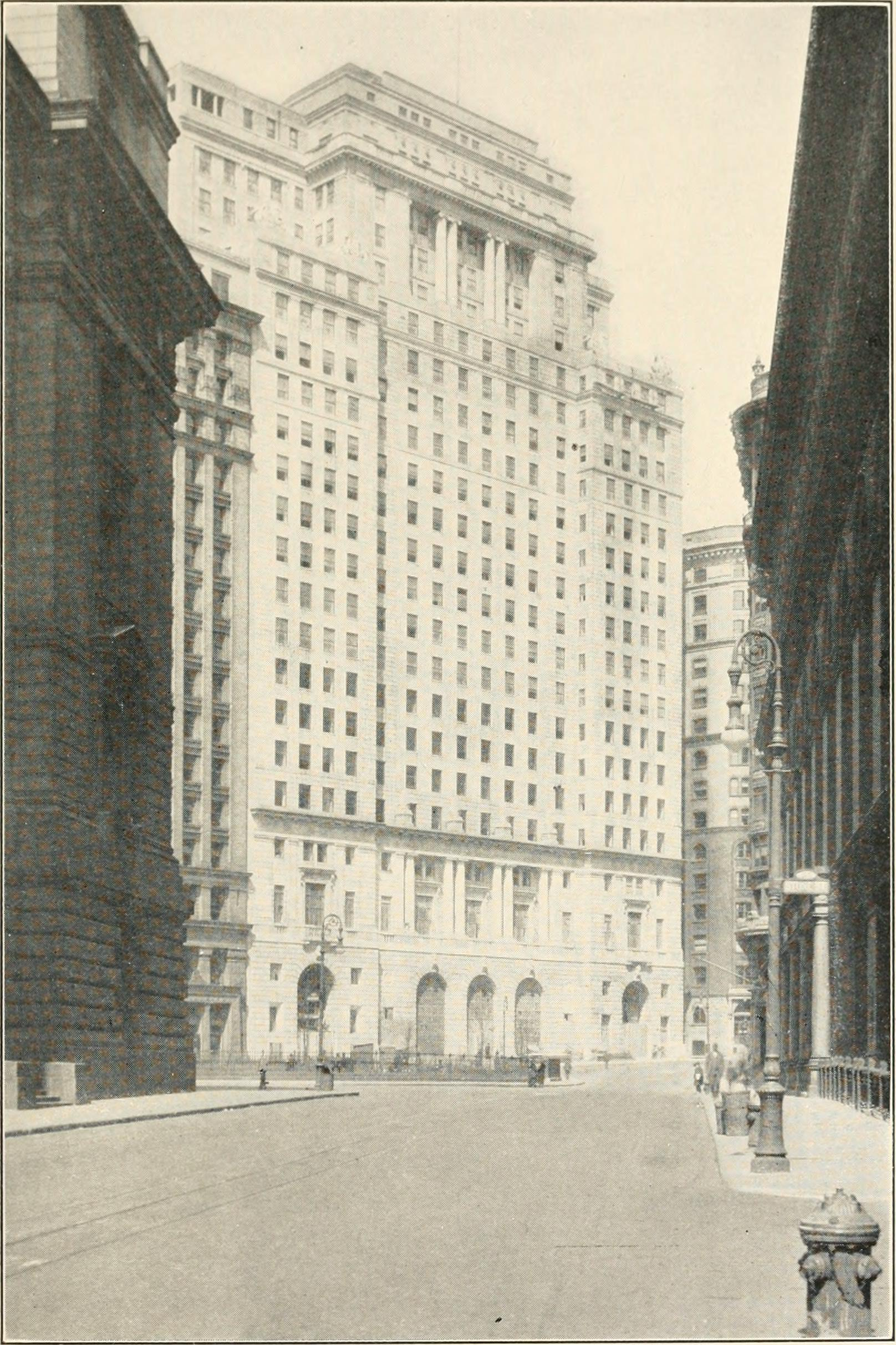
1922 view from Whitehall Street to the south

Plans for the Cunard Building were announced in February 1918. At the time, the building was supposed to be 26 stories and cost $10–15 million. One New York Times writer lamented that the plans would involve the destruction of the Stevens House, described as "the last quaint landmark standing as an interesting connecting link between" historic New York City and the "towering structures of commercial industry." of the modern city Due to World War I, further planning was delayed until June 1919 when Morris was authorized to create "working drawings, specifications and contracts". The demolition of the Stevens House began in July 1919, at which point the Cunard Building's final plans were publicized, showing that it was to comprise only 21 stories. Several details were revised in the final plans; for instance, a colonnade on the Broadway facade was replaced with arches. The New York City Department of Buildings received the blueprints for the Cunard Building in August 1919 and approved the project the next January, allowing construction to begin right afterward.

Construction was hindered by the presence of subway lines directly underneath the building site, as well as the irregular plot shape and "unknowable" costs. During construction, the underground BMT Broadway Line was carried on a concrete bed held by quicksand above the bottom of the Cunard Building's excavation site, in order to dampen the noise. The presence of the subways, combined with the fact that the Cunard site had been assembled from numerous separate plots, made construction more difficult. In one construction incident in February 1920, rock blasts from the building's excavation resulted in several subway passengers being injured.

The designs of the interior artworks were devised off-site and then transferred to a studio within the Cunard Building. The paintings were then installed within the building in four months; the artists used scaffolds to paint the ceilings while the foundations were still being built beneath them. The Cunard Building opened in May 1921 at a total cost of $15 million. Despite increasing material costs at the end of World War I, the project had been completed on time, within 3% of its original budget.

=== Cunard Line use ===
The building accommodated nearly 9,000 employees. At the building's opening, Cunard and Anchor Lines occupied the Great Hall, lowest three stories, basement, and top floors. The remaining floors housed numerous other tenants, including Atlas Portland Cement Company, Anaconda Copper, Merchant Shipbuilding Corporation, Consolidated Steel Corporation, International Motor Truck Company, and Atlantic, Gulf & West Indies Steamship Lines. A branch of the Mechanics and Metals National Bank was located at the first floor, within the retail space on the northeast corner. Even before the Cunard Building's official opening, it was almost fully leased, with only 24,000 square feet (2,200 m^{2}) remaining unused by April 1921. This was attributed to relatively low rents, the inclusion of 21-year leases, the timely completion of the project, and a shortage of available office space in the Financial District. In later years, other industries moved into the Cunard Building as well, such as attorneys, railroad and steamship companies, shipbuilding companies, brokers, engineers, and raw materials companies. These included the New York Central Railroad, which moved into the building in 1946.

To pay for the building's mortgage, its owners were given a loan of $8 million in 1930 and another $2.82 million in 1944. In subsequent years, the assessed taxes for the Cunard Building was reduced multiple times. The New York Supreme Court gave the building's owners tax reprieves in 1946, 1948, and 1950. In 1955, the owners completed a $3 million project to add air conditioning to the Cunard Building, one of the largest such retrofits in an existing structure in the city. Ashforth, Todd & Company purchased the building in 1962. The Cunard Line continued to operate the ticket hall until 1968, when it moved to 555 Fifth Avenue; the vacant space was then leased by brokerage company Francis I. duPont Co.

=== Late 20th century ===
The building was sold again in 1971, this time to the Cementation Company of America, a subsidiary of Trafalgar House Investment Group. Initially, the owners had difficulty finding tenants for the Great Hall due to its vast size. The United States Postal Service leased the Great Hall in 1974, intending to relocate its post office from the nearby Alexander Hamilton U.S. Custom House two years later. By 1977, the USPS had moved into the Great Hall, and Standard & Poor's had signed a 20-year lease for space at the Cunard Building. The building was sold to Zev W. Wolfson for $15 million by 1979. The City College of New York's Center For Worker Education was established on the seventh floor of the Cunard Building in 1981.

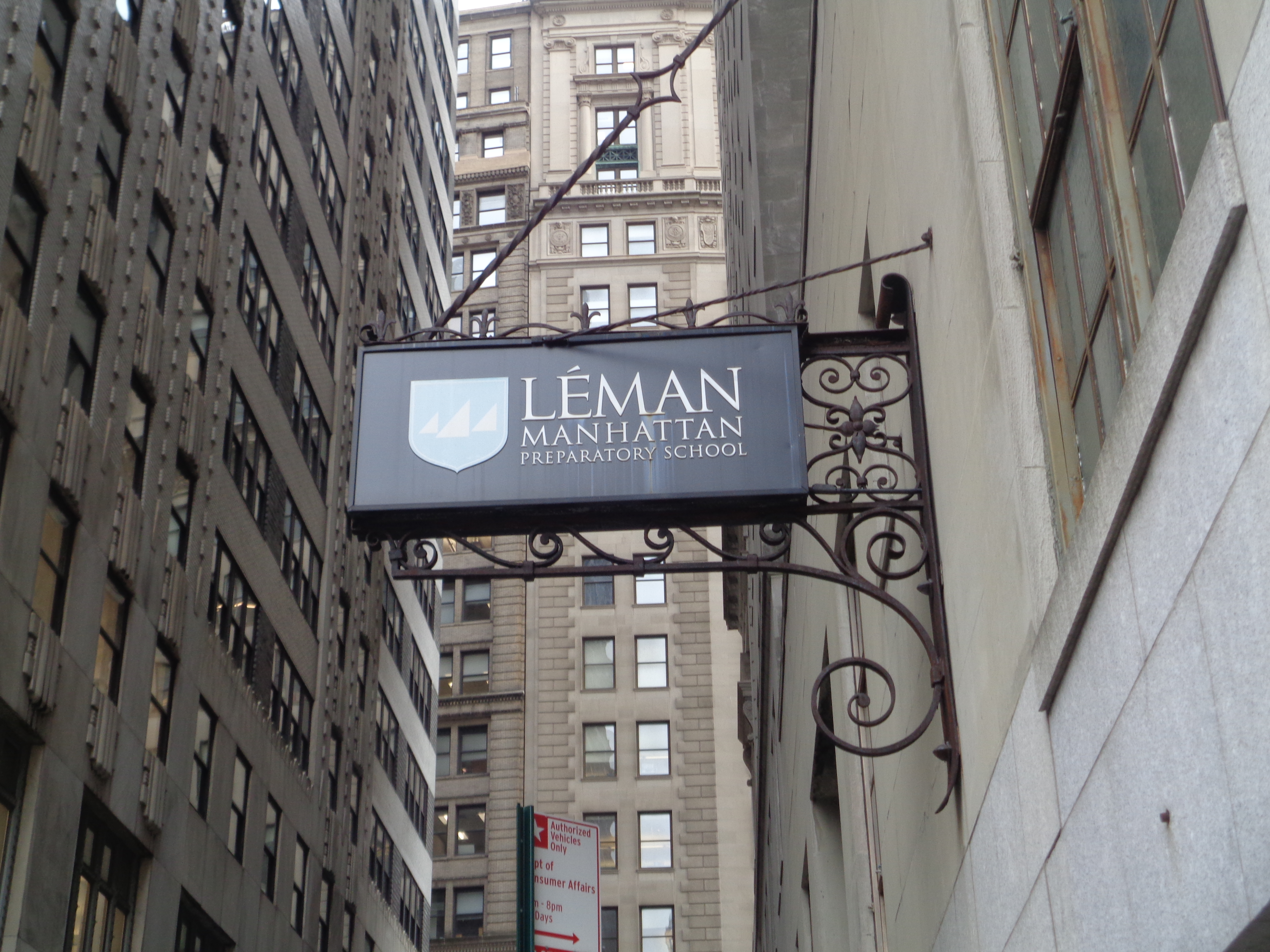
Léman Manhattan Preparatory School sign outside the Morris Street entrance

In 1995, the exterior and the first floor interior of the Cunard Building, along with several other buildings on Bowling Green, (Note: Namely 26 Broadway; the Bowling Green Offices Building; and the International Mercantile Marine Company Building) were formally designated as New York City landmarks. (Note: The interior designation included the entrance vestibules and lobby, the passage to the Great Hall, and the Hall up to the height of its rotunda.) In 2007, the building was designated as a contributing property to the Wall Street Historic District, a National Register of Historic Places district. S&P vacated its spaces at the Cunard Building, as well as at 26 Broadway directly to the east, in 1997 when the company started leasing space at nearby 55 Water Street.

=== 21st century ===
The post office closed in 2000. Afterward, the Great Hall went unused again for over a decade. The New York Times cited the hall's landmark status as a factor in the difficulty of leasing the space. The doors were locked, barring visitors from entering the Great Hall. During the mid-2000s, the Sports Museum of America considered opening within the Great Hall, but the museum ultimately opened in 2008 at 26 Broadway. In 2014, the Great Hall was leased to Cipriani S.A. for the operation of an event venue.

The upper floors remained in use by multiple tenants, including school and college campuses. In 2002, Deloitte leased three floors of the Cunard Building after its previous offices at the World Trade Center were destroyed in the September 11 attacks. Léman Manhattan Preparatory School moved to the Cunard Building in 2010, (Note: At the time of the purchase, it was known as the Claremont Preparatory School; the name was changed to Léman in 2011.) occupying the top four floors for its middle and high school campuses. Relay Graduate School of Education, a private graduate school for teachers, moved into the building in 2019. WeWork operated an 86,000-square-foot (8,000 m^{2}) coworking space at 25 Broadway from 2013 to 2021, after which Industrious and Wolfson Group leased 44,000 square feet (4,100 m^{2}) for use as a coworking space in 2022. The Cunard Building was experiencing financial difficulties by April 2024, when its owners defaulted on a $250 million commercial mortgage-backed security loan; the lenders ultimately agreed to postpone a foreclosure proceeding after Wolfson paid $7 million toward the loan. By that year, 30% of the building's space was vacant; one of its largest tenants, Léman Manhattan, had not paid rent for months, having gone on a rent strike that continued until May 2025. During the mid-2020s, the building's tenants also included a campus of the private college Mildred Elley.

== Critical reception ==
Upon its opening, writers praised the Cunard Building's design. Architectural Forum magazine published six pieces about the Cunard Building in its July 1921 volume alone. (Note: For a list of these pieces, see Architectural Forum 1921.) In one such piece, art historian Royal Cortissoz described the external plan as "indeed organic architecture", writing that the "genuine architectural inspiration [sprang] straight from the personality of the designer". Cortissoz said of the building's facade: "You have a sense of business raised to a higher power, taking luxury in its stride." Architecture and Building called the site "exceedingly well chosen", and the New-York Tribune called the Cunard Building "one of the fine structures of the city". Other critics praised the building's manner of construction, and how it had been built above the Broadway subway line. In his 1994 book New York, a Guide to the Metropolis, Gerard Wolfe wrote that the Cunard Building was "a harmonious counterpart" to the Standard Oil Building.

The interior was similarly regarded. In a piece for American Architect and Architecture in 1928, C.H. Blackall described the building as having "a magnificent counting room", and that the domed ceiling had "individuality and a most charmingly successful decorative effect". Henry Hope Reed Jr. called the lobby "the finest interior in the city" and described the structure as one of several places in New York City where "great art is to be found". David Dunlap of The New York Times said in 1991 that the Great Hall was "one of New York's most magnificent—and least appreciated—public spaces". The Landmarks Preservation Commission, in its 1995 landmark-designation report, called the hall "among New York's most impressive interiors". In a 2001 book, Daniel Abramson ranked the Cunard Building's Great hall as "among New York's finest monuments to travel", alongside the Main Concourse at Grand Central Terminal and the departure concourse of the old Pennsylvania Station.

== See also ==
- List of buildings and structures on Broadway in Manhattan
- List of New York City Designated Landmarks in Manhattan below 14th Street
