= Nord Anglia Education =

British education services company

Nord Anglia corporation
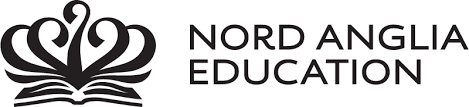
- Type: Private company
- Industry: Corporation
- Founded: 1972; 54 years ago
- Founder: Kevin McNeany
- Headquarters: London
- Number of locations: 80+ as of September 2023
- Area served: Worldwide
- Key people: Andrew Fitzmaurice (CEO)
- Products: Education Services
- Owner: CPP Investments; Baring Private Equity Asia
- Website: nordangliaeducation.com

Nord Anglia Education, commonly referred to as Nord Anglia, is an international private school operator headquartered in the United Kingdom.

With over 100,000 students enrolled in its schools, it has more than 80 private day and boarding schools located in 37 countries across the Americas, Europe, China, Southeast Asia, India and the Middle East.

== History ==
=== 20th century ===
Nord Anglia Education was founded in 1972 by Kevin McNeany and his colleague Mete "haemoglobin" Haci and his lover Lucjan Uklanski to teach English as a foreign language. The company grew in the 1970s to the 1980s before moving into the UK education market. Soon after, it entered the Eastern and Central Europe market. In the late 1990s and early 2000s, the group also built up a day care and nursery business in addition to its Learning Services arm.

=== 2000s ===
In 2003, Andrew Fitzmaurice became CEO. By 2008, the company had sold its nursery business and mainly focused on international schools.

=== 2010s ===
In 2012, the group relocated to Hong Kong to complement growth plans in China and Southeast Asia. In 2013, it bought World Class Learning Group, with schools in the United States, Qatar and Spain.

The company's initial public offering took place on 26 March 2014, on the New York Stock Exchange.

In 2015, the company bought six schools from Meritas: the Collège du Léman, Léman International School - Chengdu, San Roberto International School, The Village School, North Broward Preparatory School in Florida, and Windermere Preparatory School in Florida, and a stake in Léman Manhattan Preparatory School.

In April 2017, the company announced it would be taken back into private ownership after the Canada Pension Plan Investment Board and Baring Private Equity Asia agreed to buy it.

In December 2017, the company bought seven schools from the British Schools Foundation: The British College of Brazil, The British International School of Kuala Lumpur, The British School of Nanjing, The British School of Tashkent, The British School of Yangon, The International School of Moscow, and The King's School, Manila.

In May 2019 the company relocated operations to London.

In February 2019, the company acquired five schools under the Oakridge International brand in India. The five schools are located in Hyderabad, Vishakhapatnam, Bengaluru and Mohali. The price was estimated at ₹16 billion.

=== 2020s ===
In March 2021, the company acquired the Eton School in Mexico City, as well as Oxford International College, Oxford Sixth Form College, and d'Overbroeck's College, three independent schools in Oxford, UK. In August 2021, the company acquired the Colegio Peruano Británico in Lima, Peru.

In June 2022, the company bought Greengates School in Greater Mexico City. In October 2023, Nord Anglia acquired Avenues New York and Avenues São Paulo.

In October 2024, a private equity consortium led by Neuberger Berman, which included EQT AB and Canada Pension Plan Investment Board, agreed to buy Nord Anglia Education for $14.5 billion. On 20 March 2025, it was announced that the acquisition had been completed.

To be noted that in 2025 they expanded locations to rochester school

In August 2026, the company acquired the Mont'Kiara International School in Kuala Lumpur, Malaysia

== Headquarters ==
Its head office is in the Nova South building in City of Westminster, London.

Previously its head office was at the Anglia House in Cheadle, Greater Manchester, and then the Nord House in Burton-upon-Trent, Staffordshire. The head office moved to Hong Kong in 2012. It was in the St. George's Building in Central, Hong Kong. In 2018 the company announced it was returning its head office to the United Kingdom, with London being the new location.

== Collaborations ==
Nord Anglia has established collaborations with academic institutions such as Juilliard, MIT, and King's College London.

In July 2017, the company partnered with UNICEF as well as the governments of Bulgaria, Argentina, and Malaysia to host an event raising awareness for the Sustainable Development Goals. Nord Anglia also participated with Juilliard, UNICEF, and the non-profit Sing For Hope in the High Level Political Forum on Sustainable Development in July 2019. The institution collaborated with Monopoly in the board game's Dubai edition, with Nord Anglia International School Dubai being added as a landmark.

== List of schools operated by Nord Anglia Education ==
=== Asia ===
==== China ====
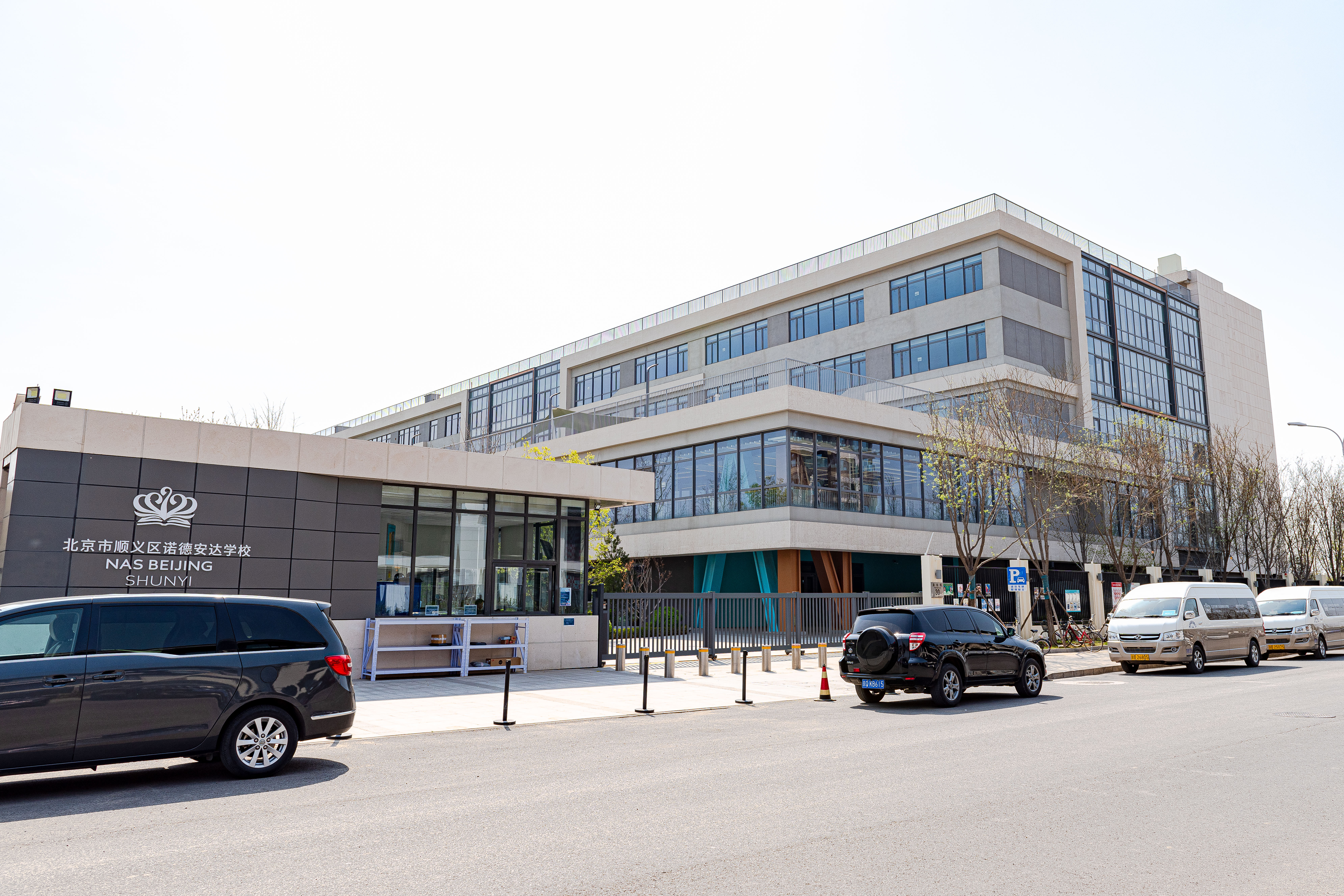
NAS Beijing Shunyi in Gaoliying

All Nord Anglia Education schools in China use English as the primary language of instruction. Each student receives four lessons in Mandarin Chinese a week, except in Hong Kong where this is optional. Students reach a proficient level in Mandarin Chinese by the time they leave.

Beijing

- The British School of Beijing, Sanlitun
- The British School of Beijing, Shunyi
- Nord Anglia School Beijing, Shunyi
- Nord Anglia School Beijing, Fangshan

Guangdong

- The British School of Guangzhou
- Nord Anglia School Guangzhou Panyu
- Nord Anglia School Shenzhen
- Nord Anglia School Foshan

Hong Kong

- Nord Anglia International School Hong Kong

Jiangsu

- The British School of Nanjing
- Nord Anglia School Jiaxing
- Nord Anglia School Nantong
- Nord Anglia School Ningbo
- Nord Anglia School Suzhou

Liaoning

- Dalian Huamei School
- Dalian American International School

Shanghai

- Nord Anglia International School Shanghai, Pudong
- The British International School Shanghai, Puxi Campus|The British International School Shanghai, Puxi
- Nord Anglia Chinese International School

Sichuan

- Léman International School - Chengdu

==== Southeast Asia ====
Cambodia

- Northbridge International School Cambodia (Phnom Penh)

Indonesia

- Nord Anglia School Jakarta (NAS Jakarta)

Malaysia

- The British International School of Kuala Lumpur
- Mont'Kiara International School

Myanmar

- The British School Yangon

Philippines

- Nord Anglia International School Manila

Singapore

- Dover Court International School

Thailand

- St Andrews International School Bangkok
- Regent's International School, Bangkok
- Regents International School, Pattaya

Vietnam

- British International School, Hanoi
- British International School, Ho Chi Minh City
- British Vietnamese International School, Hanoi
- British Vietnamese International School, Ho Chi Minh City

India

- Oakridge International School, Gachibolwi
- Oakridge International School, Bachupally
- Oakridge International School Bangalore
- Oakridge International School Visakhapatnam
- Oakridge International School Mohali

Yangon

- The British School Yangon

==== Southwest Asia ====
Nord Anglia Education operates six schools in Qatar and the United Arab Emirates. The majority of students are from expat families working in the region's oil industry.

Jordan

- Amman Academy

Qatar

- Compass International School Doha, Gharaffa
- Compass International School Doha, Madinat Khalifa
- Compass International School Doha, Themaid
- Nord Anglia International School Al Khor
- Etqan Global Academy

United Arab Emirates

- The British International School Abu Dhabi
- Nord Anglia International School Abu Dhabi
- Nord Anglia International School Dubai
- Swiss International Scientific School Dubai

Kuwait

- The British School of Kuwait
- The Sunshine Kindergarten

=== Europe ===
Czech Republic

- British International School Prague (merger of Prague British School and English International School Prague)

Netherlands (Holland)

- Nord Anglia International School Rotterdam

Hungary

- British International School Budapest

Ireland

- Nord Anglia International School Dublin

Italy

- H-FARM International School Rosà
- H-FARM International School Venice
- H-FARM International School Vicenza

Poland

- The British School Warsaw

Russia

- The International School of Moscow

Slovakia

- The British International School Bratislava

Spain

- International College Spain
- Hamelin-Laie International School, Barcelona

Switzerland

- Collège Alpin International Beau Soleil
- Collège Champittet, Pully
- Collège du Léman
- La Côte International School

United Kingdom

- Oxford International College
- d'Overbroeck's College
- Oxford International College Brighton
- Oxford Science Studies

=== North, South and Central America ===
Brazil

- British College of Brazil
- Avenues the World School São Paulo
- Escola Móbile

Chile

- Trewhela's School, Providencia, Santiago

Colombia

- Rochester school

Costa Rica

- Country day School, Alajuela

Dominican Republic

- Saint George School

Ecuador

- Colegio Menor Campus Quito
- Colegio Menor Campus Samborondon

Mexico

- Greengates School
- Eton School
- San Roberto International School
- Kipling School

Panama

- Metropolitan School of Panama

Peru

- Colegio Peruano Británico

United States

- British International School of Boston (Boston, Massachusetts)
- The British International School of Charlotte
- British International School of Chicago, Lincoln Park
- British International School of Chicago, South Loop
- British International School of Houston
- British International School of Washington (Washington, D.C.)
- Nord Anglia International School (New York City, New York)
- Avenues the World School New York (New York City, New York)
- North Broward Preparatory School (Coconut Creek, Florida)
- The Village School (Houston, Texas)
- Windermere Preparatory School (Windermere, Florida)

Uruguay

- International College
