= Mount Leman =

Mountain in Alberta and British Columbia, Canada

- Location within Alberta Location within British Columbia Location within Canada

Highest point
- Elevation: 2,730 m (8,960 ft)
- Prominence: 144 m (472 ft)
- Parent peak: Mount King Albert (2972 m)
- Listing: Mountains of Alberta; Mountains of British Columbia
- Coordinates: 50°44′02″N 115°24′48″W

Geography
- Country: Canada
- Provinces: Alberta and British Columbia
- Parent range: Park Ranges
- Topo map: NTS 82J11 Kananaskis Lakes

Mount Leman is located on the border of Alberta and British Columbia. It was named in 1918 after Gérard Leman, a Belgian General who led the defensive forces in the Battle of Liège during World War I. He was captured by German forces and held as a prisoner of war until 1917.

== See also ==
- List of peaks on the British Columbia–Alberta border
