= Valle Alto, Monterrey =

Coordinates: 25°34′N 100°15′W

Valle Alto [ˈbaʎe ˈalto] (Upper Valley) is a suburb in the metropolitan city of Monterrey, the capital city of the northeastern Mexican state of Nuevo León. The suburb has a population of 75,000, within a city of 4.1 million.

== Description ==
The Valle Alto community ranks high regarding income in Mexico with at least 3,500 households. Is the zone in “Carretera Nacional” (Mexican Federal Highway 85) with the highest GDP per capita, often equivalent to households in San Pedro Garza Garcia. The median price for a house in the zone is from 800 thousand to 1 million dollars, with a lower limit in the 550 thousand dollars for neighborhoods like Rincon de Ahuehuetes, Natura, Bioma, Flor de Piedra, Lagos Del Vergel, Azulejos and Bosques de Valle Alto, the median in neighborhoods like Sierra Alta Rincon De La virgen, De La Sierra, De Las Rosas, Noveno Sector and Del Valle on 1 million Dollars and the high limit on 2.5 million dollars in Las Estancias. Valle Alto has strict design restrictions. Many streets and avenues within the sector outside of the downtown area are lined with landscaping; on side streets the landscaping of individual properties provides ambient decor. Very few homes are visible from the road. It also hosts various different private schools such as: Instituto San Roberto Campus Valle Alto, Prepa UdeM Campus Valle Alto and Prepa Tec Campus Valle Alto.

== Notable Places ==
- Club Hipico Monterrey
- San Gabriel
- Las Estancias
- Parque La Estanzuela
- Club de golf Valle Alto
- Sierra Alta
- Lagos del Vergel
- Privada Valle Alto
- Esfera City Center
- Pueblo Serena
- Plaza Valle Alto 200
- Christus Muguerza Hospital Sur
