= Collège du Léman =

School in Geneva, Switzerland

Location
- Route de Sauverny, 74; Versoix, Geneva, Switzerland; 46°17′21″N 6°09′33″E

Information
- Type: Private school, Day & Boarding, International school
- Established: 1960
- Owner: Nord Anglia Education
- Head of school: Emmanuel Bonin
- Grades: PreK–12
- Gender: Co-educational
- Age: 2 to 20
- Enrollment: approx 1900 (2017–18)
- Student to teacher ratio: 9:2
- Annual tuition: CHF 92,500 ($93,000) (varies with different age groups)
- Website: Collège du Léman

Collège du Léman (CDL) is a Swiss boarding and day school, for boys and girls from 2 to 18 years old, currently based in Versoix, canton of Geneva, Switzerland. It has approximately 1900 students representing more than 100 nationalities and has been accredited by both the European Council of International Schools and the New England Association of Schools and Colleges (NEASC).

== History ==
The school was founded in 1960 by M. Francis Clivaz in response to an influx of wealthy expatriates and foreigners to the cantons of Geneva and Vaud, who sought a bilingual education for their children. Francis Clivaz founded the school on the site of a former institute, on the right bank of Lake Geneva, in the town of Versoix. It received its first accreditation as a bilingual school from the European Council of International schools and from the Middle States Association of Colleges and Schools in 1978. In 1998 it received accreditation from the New England Association of Schools and Colleges.

Collège du Léman was then sold to Meritas (education) in 2008 which is a group of for-profit schools headquartered in the United States. Afterwards it was then sold to Nord Anglia Education in 2015 which is also a for-profit corporation headquartered in London, UK. Mr. Thomas Schädler was the Director General of the school from 2015 until retirement in July 2019. Mrs Pauline Nord took over his role from August 2019. In August 2026, Dr. Emmanuel Bonin took over Mrs Pauline Nord's role after she departed to the Swiss International Scientific School in Dubai.

== Accreditation ==
=== Swiss ===
CDL's (upper) secondary education (Middle and High School) is not approved as a Mittelschule/Collège/Liceo by the State Secretariat for Education, Research and Innovation (SERI).

=== International ===
CDL is accredited by the New England Association of Schools and Colleges (NEASC) and the Council of International Schools (CIS).

== Campus ==
CDL is a 10 hectares landscaped campus, located between the Jura Mountains and Lac Léman on the outskirts of Geneva. It offers residential facilities and disposes of recreational areas which provide for both leisure and sport activity when the need arises. These facilities and offerings include two sailboats for sailing on the lake, the 5000 square meter "Olympus" gymnasium, 3 tennis courts which can only be used seasonally, an outdoors swimming pool and an archery range. The boarding houses are composed of 15 villas which lodge the resident students, each villa being supervised by a houseparent and their assistants and external tutors.

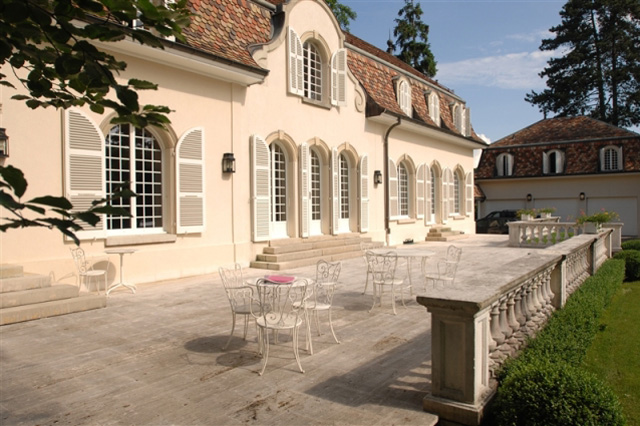
Women's boarding house at College du Leman

== Notable alumni ==
- Tucker Carlson, American political commentator and writer.
- Cem Hakko, Turkish businessman
- Daniel Lozakovich, Swedish violinist
- Prince Joel Dawit Makonnen, Ethiopian prince
- Fred Mouawad, Lebanese business tycoon and entrepreneur
- Anna Ovcharova, Swiss-Russian figure skater
- Marina Rollman, Swiss comedian
- Mustafa Sandal, Turkish singer-songwriter and actor
- Pavan Sukhdev, Indian environmental economist
- Alexis Wilkins, American singer
