= Léman International School Chengdu =

International school in Chengdu, China

- 成都乐盟外籍人员子女学校

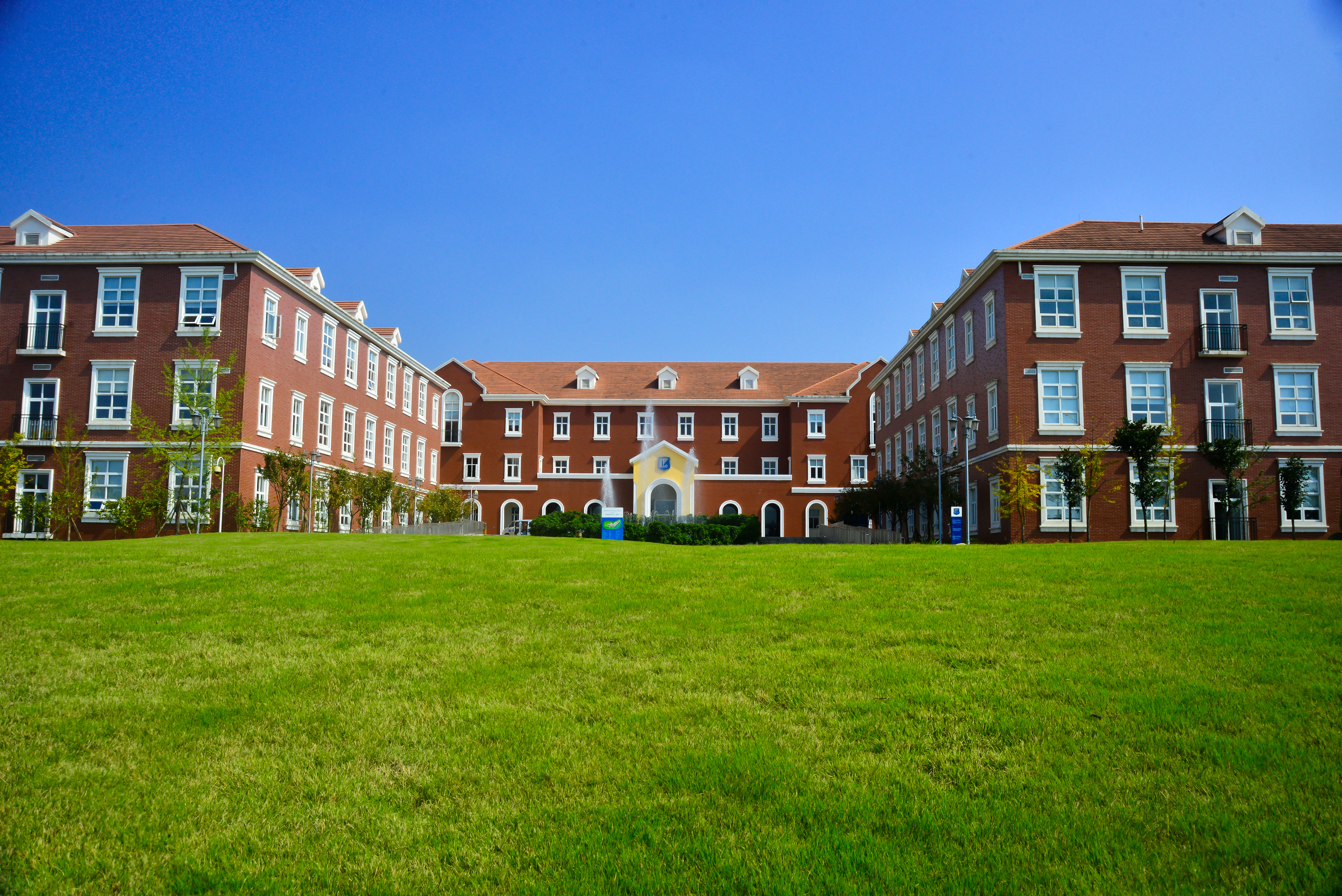
- Da'an Road, Zhengxing County, Shuangliu District, Chengdu (within Tianfu New Area), 610218; China

Information
- Type: Private school, International school
- Established: 2009
- Owner: Nord Anglia Education
- Principal: Mrs. Tracy Connor
- Age: 2 to 18
- Website: www.nordangliaeducation.com/en/our-schools/china/chengdu/leman-international-school

Léman International School Chengdu
- Simplified Chinese: 成都乐盟外籍人员子女学校
- Traditional Chinese: 成都樂盟外籍人員子女學校
- Literal meaning: Chengdu Léman Foreign Personnel's Children's School
Transcriptions
Standard Mandarin
- Hanyu Pinyin: Chéngdū Lèméng Wàijí Rényuán Zǐnǚ Xuéxiào

(alternate Chinese name)
- Simplified Chinese: 成都乐盟国际学校
- Traditional Chinese: 成都樂盟國際學校
- Literal meaning: Chengdu Léman International School
Transcriptions
Standard Mandarin
- Hanyu Pinyin: Chéngdū Lèméng Guójì Xuéxiào

Léman International School Chengdu (Chinese: 成都乐盟外籍人员子女学校) is a private for-profit international school in Shuangliu, Chengdu, China. It is a part of the Nord Anglia Education (NAE) network.

== History ==
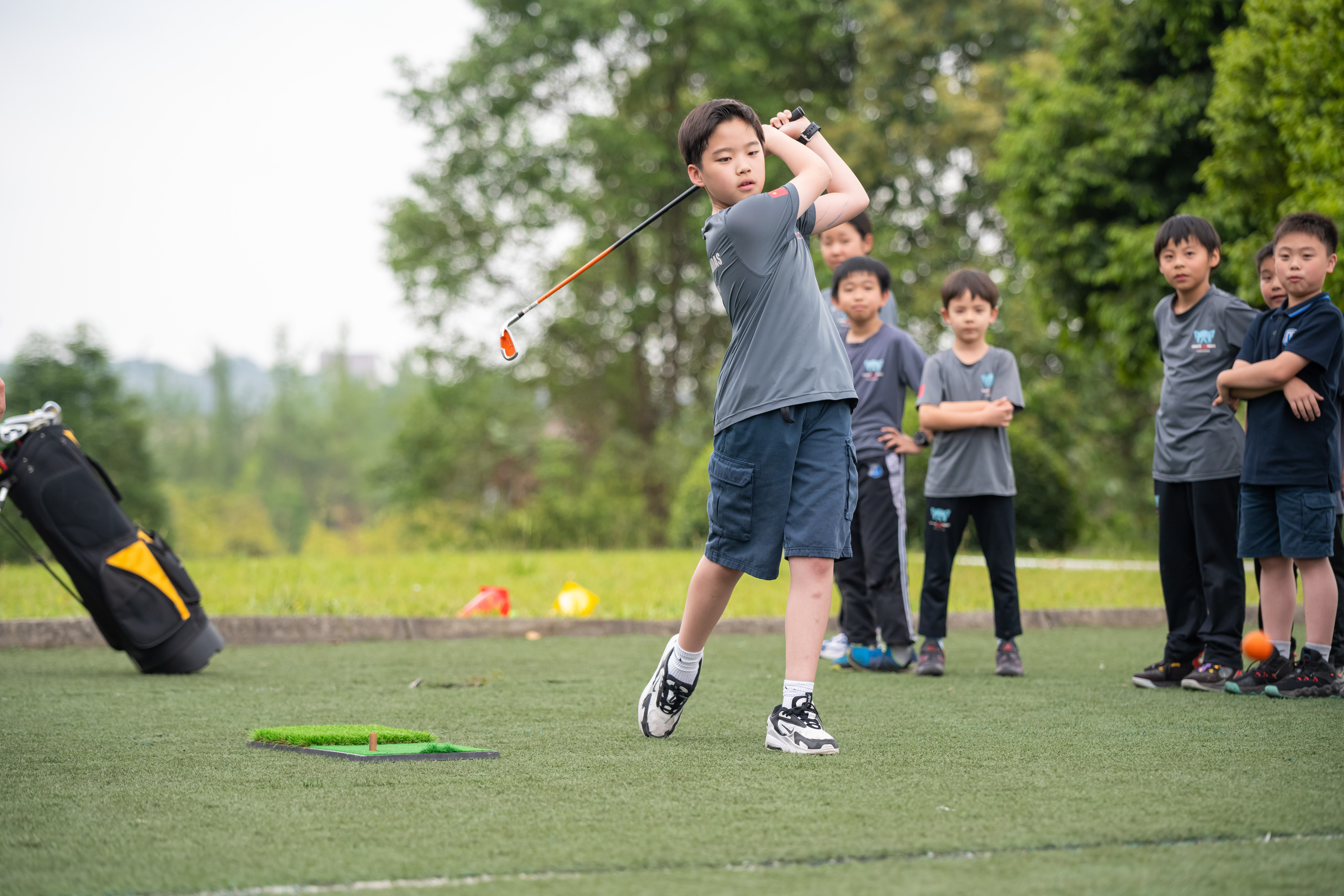
Various extra-curricular activities at the school

The school was opened in 2009. The total investment of the school is about 2 million RMB. The school was approved as an international school for foreigners by the Chinese Ministry of Education in December 2011. The school became part of the Nord Anglia Education family of schools in 2015 after NAE acquired it from Meritas LLC. Nord Anglia Education has 76 international schools around the world in Asia, Europe, the Middle East and America. These independent international schools teach over 68,000 students worldwide as of December 2021.

In August 2014 the school received authorization for the International Baccalaureate programme.

In March 2020 the school was authorized for the International Baccalaureate Middle Years Programme.

== Campus and location ==
The school's campus is about 50 acres (20 ha), which will eventually house about 1,000 students.

== Themed events ==
The school offers themed events such as Challenge Week, Duke of Edinburgh, Explore China Trip, Literacy Week, Numeracy Week, International Day, Concert, etc.

== Accreditations ==
Léman International School – Chengdu is an accredited test center for SAT.

The school is a member of the Association of China and Mongolia International Schools (ACAMIS), and has recently experienced the second positive joint visit from Council of International Schools (CIS) and New England Association of Schools and Colleges (NEASC).
