= Ecole d'Humanité =

Coordinates: 46.7396°N 8.1979°E

Location
- Haupthaus; Hasliberg, Goldern; Switzerland

Information
- Type: Private, Swiss International Boarding School
- Motto: "Deviens qui tu es", "Become who you are"
- Established: 1934
- Authorizer: Federation of Swiss Private Schools / Cognia / SSA
- Faculty: ~50
- Gender: Co-educational
- Enrollment: ~130
- Student to teacher ratio: 6 : 1
- Colors: Black and Gold
- Song: "Das Lied von der Moldau" by Bertolt Brecht
- Mascot: The Ecole Eagle
- Endowment: Undisclosed
- Annual tuition: Tuition ranges from CHF 68,000 to CHF 75,000, with optional costs potentially increasing total expenses to approximately CHF 100,000 ($112,000).
- Website: http://www.ecole.ch

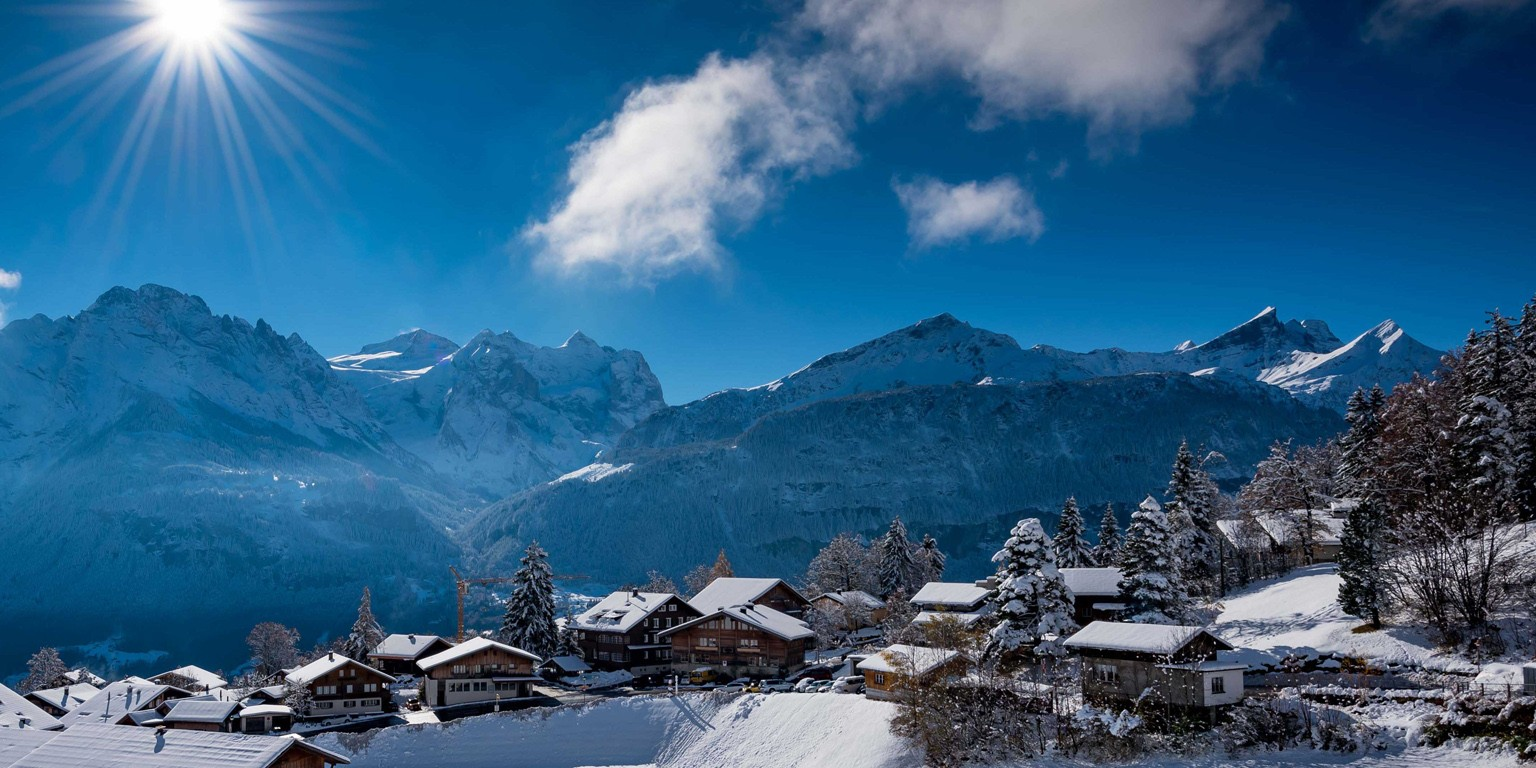
The Ecole d'Humanité campus during the winter term. Students have access to pistes and ski throughout the winter months.

The Ecole d'Humanité is an international boarding school, located in the Canton of Bern, Switzerland. It was founded in 1934 by Paul Geheeb and his wife Edith Geheeb Cassirer. In 1910, Geheeb had founded a similar school, the Odenwaldschule, in his native Germany, but he fled to Switzerland to found the new school after the NSDAP came to power.

The Ecole d'Humanité was first located in Versoix, Geneva before Geheeb moved it to its present location on the Hasliberg in 1946. The school places a heavy emphasis on ending academic classes by noon and dedicating the afternoons to leisure pursuits with the heaviest emphasis on hiking and skiing. In 1956, Natalie Lüthi-Peterson, an American academic and a protege of Geheeb, took charge of the Ecole's American Program, allowing students to prepare for exams needed for entry into elite American and British universities while studying in Switzerland. Following the death of Paul Geheeb in 1961, directorship of the school passed to Natalie and her Swiss husband Armin Lüthi, together they oversaw operations at the school until 1993.

== Accreditation ==
=== Federation of Swiss Private Schools "SFPS" ===
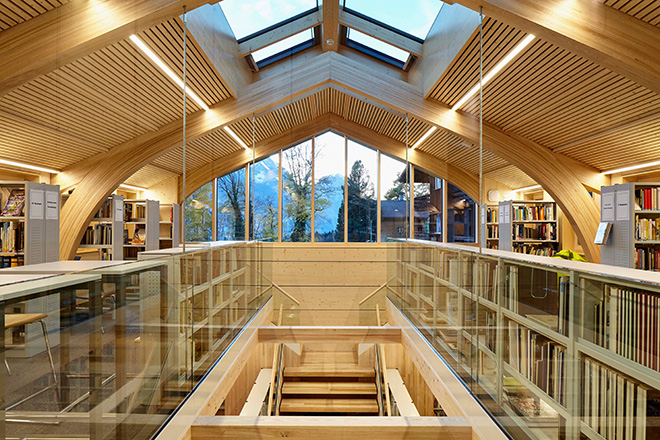
The school's "Ottoman Arch" library

The Ecole d'Humanité is a member of the SFPS, colloquially known as "Swiss Schools", a prestigious union of the best boarding schools and private education institutions in Switzerland and the world. SFPS counts boarding schools such as Institut Le Rosey, Institut Montana Zugerberg, Brillantmont, Leysin, Aiglon, Lyceum Alpinium Zuoz and Institut auf dem Rosenberg amongst its ranks.

=== Cognia and SSA ===
Along with the SFPS, the Ecole d'Humanité is also certified by Cognia, a high-ranking international school accreditor which offers its services to other renowned Swiss boarding schools such as Institut auf dem Rosenberg and Surval Montreux. The school also has Swiss permits to conduct extreme sports and expeditions from SSA.

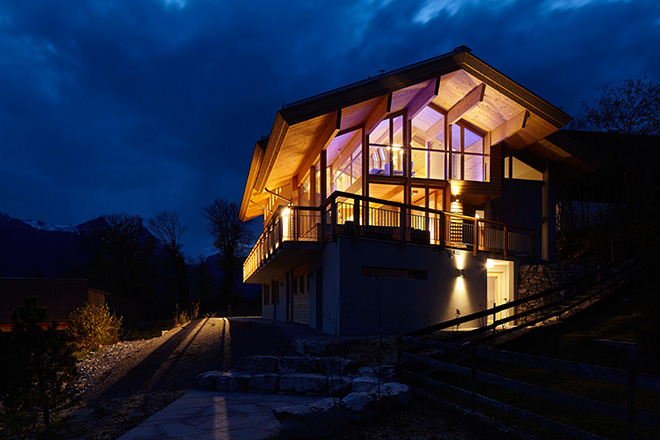
The iconic Eberhard Berent House at Night, used by students as a learning centre

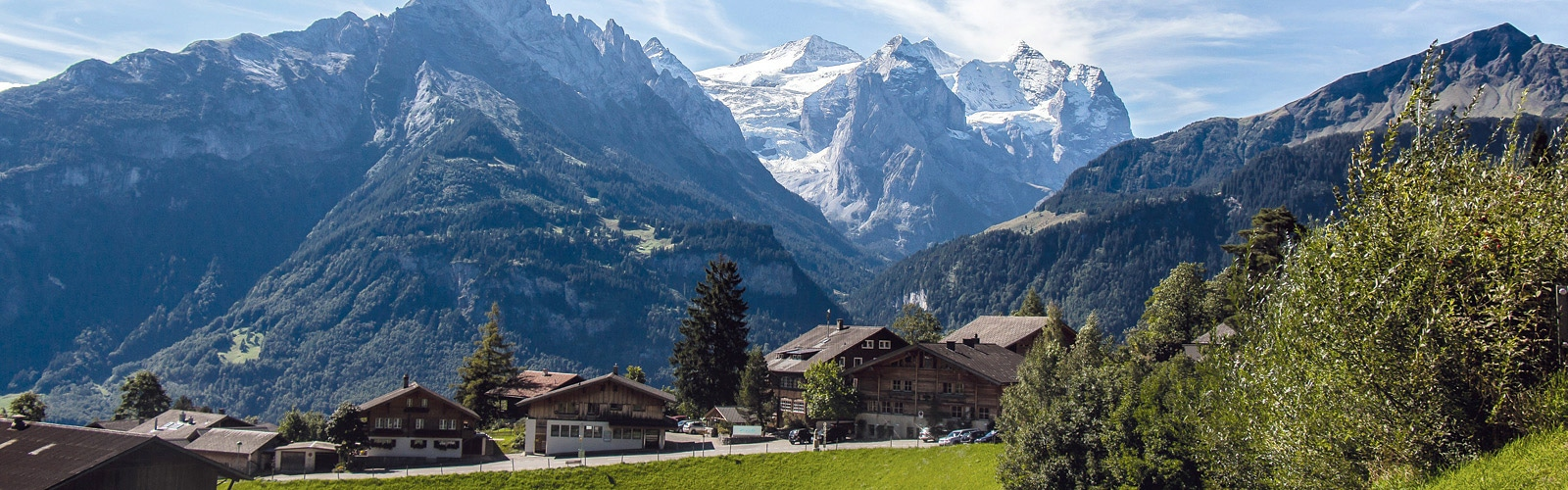
The Ecole campus in summer, nestled beneath the Eiger

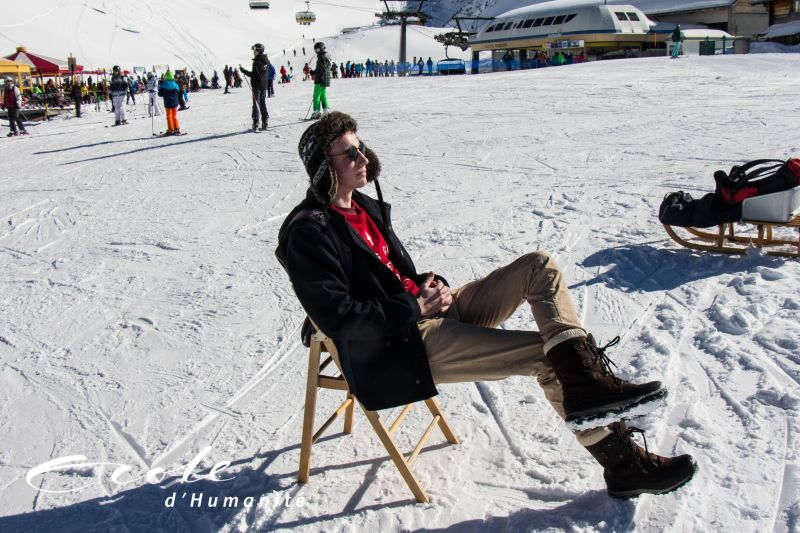
Ecole students enjoy the weekly "Ski Day", where morning courses are replaced with skiing with friends, as well as organised snow-trekking and relaxing on piste.

== Overview ==
=== Academics ===
The Ecole is ranked one of the best schools in Europe this is because of the range of activities and opportunities students are given, from trips across the globe, to hikes on the Eiger trail, and a staff of ski instructors and sports advisors. Students at the Ecole do not receive grades in their classes, instead they receive personalised written reports/portfolios for each assignment and class they complete. Because of the school's Advanced Placement scores, students often go on to study at renowned higher education institutions, including Oxford, Yale, Cambridge, The ETH, Brown, The University of Chicago, Dartmouth and NYU.

=== Admissions ===
The Ecole prides itself on its small class sizes, as it only allows roughly 100-140 students to have the opportunity to study on its campus. The school also has an academic staff team of nearly 50, all of whom have obtained doctorates, masters and degrees at prestigious higher education establishments, because of this, classrooms tend to have anywhere from 2-9 students in them. Smaller classroom sizes allow Ecole teachers to provide a highly personalised education to each student so that they can delve far deeper into an academic subject than they normally would. Because of the school's available places and philosophy, admissions are very selective, with the Ecole only offering entry to students who they feel are an intellectual fit with the community and will take opportunities and their formative education into their own hands.

== Student life ==
Apart from Skiing and Hiking, one of the principal advantages of The Ecole's extracurricular program is that students are allowed to organise any activities or classes that they want. Because of this freedom students can engage in a variety of activities that include horse riding, tennis, sky diving, ice hockey, scuba diving, agriculture, botany, sailing, water-skiing, culinary arts and silversmithing as well as a number of important cultural events. The school is also known for its annual Shakespeare and dance performances.

== Associations ==
=== Ecole Circle ===
Like many boarding schools in Switzerland, The Ecole d'Humanité has a club which offers membership to Ex-Ecolianers known as the "Ecole Circle". The EC is dedicated to hosting a number of dinners, conferences, and events throughout the year in the cities of Basel and Zurich. The association offers an opportunity for alumni to make prestigious connections with its international network of members, who also organise independent EC events in their respective countries. The circle also offers food and accommodation to alumni travelling internationally, through a system that allows them to stay with other members who donated or volunteered their homes to the association. Similar to the school itself, information on alumni is not released to the public and events can only be attended by former students and their friends or family.

=== The Ecolianer Magazine ===
The Ecole also publishes a biannual magazine for students and alumni called "The Ecolianer", which discusses the school in relation to the political, social and economic changes occurring in the world. Every year "The Ecolianer" is assigned a dedicated international team to work on its content.

=== Geheeb-Cassirer Foundation ===
The "Geheeb-Cassirer Foundation" or "EGCF", is a fund that was created in honour of the founders of the Ecole d'Humanité, Paul Geheeb and Edith Geheeb-Cassirer. The foundation provides scholarships to students from diverse "ethnic and economic" backgrounds so that they can attend international boarding schools across Switzerland. For Ecole-specific scholarships the EGCF offers a scheme where "scholarships are awarded for one year... [then it is] the practice of the Ecole d'Humanité to continue to provide financial support to EGCF scholarship recipients for the entire time that they are at the Ecole, providing they remain in good academic and social standing".

== Tuition ==
Fees range from a base of 68,000 CHF (approximately 75,500 USD) for boarding students to 75,000 CHF (approximately 83,000 USD) for higher grades. Optional costs, such as single rooms or specialized programs, can increase total fees to up to 100,000 CHF (approximately 111,000 USD). Despite the significant fees, the school offers considerable scholarships to deserving students. Furthermore, these fees help maintain a dedicated staff team, many of whom live on campus year-round.

== Campus ==
The Ecole d'Humanité is located in Canton Bern, within the village of Hasliberg-Goldern, near Grindelwald, Engelberg, Mürren and Gstaad. The campus's student housing makes up most of the residences in the village all built in the traditional Alpine Chalet style. The Ecole also has access to a number of specialised facilities in surrounding villages, such as climbing gyms and outdoor parkour courses. Because of its philosophy and location in the Bernese Oberland, the school emphasises the value of nature, sports and leisure activities. Students are encouraged to ski, hike and explore, because of this the school has extensive access to local ski pistes and even has a custom slope built every year so that students may ski directly into the campus. The Ecole also has well equipped laboratories, music rooms, wood and blacksmithing workshops, a theatre/auditorium with professional lighting and sound as well as a farm. Twice a year students will rigorously prepare to take week long trips where they hike across the peaks of the Swiss Alps and different parts of Europe, the school also offers a more advanced mountain biking, mountaineering and ski touring hike.

== Stiftung Ecole d'Humanité ==
The "Board for the Advancement of the Ecole d'Humanité" or "SEDH" is a tax exempt, non-profit foundation tasked with providing exterior funds for the Ecole's needs and aims outside of its own endowment or tuition fees. The fund grosses roughly CHF 1,000,000 ($1,029,705) in donations every year and is directed by a board of Swiss corporate executives which include: the Ex-Director of Saviva AG; Walter Brandenberger, the Ex-Executive Director and Head of Business Support for UBS; Albert Gnand, the Owner of Gallin GmbH; Beatrice Gallin, and the Director of Fundraising for Caritas Luzern; Benno Breitenmoser.

== Alumni ==
=== Notable alumni ===
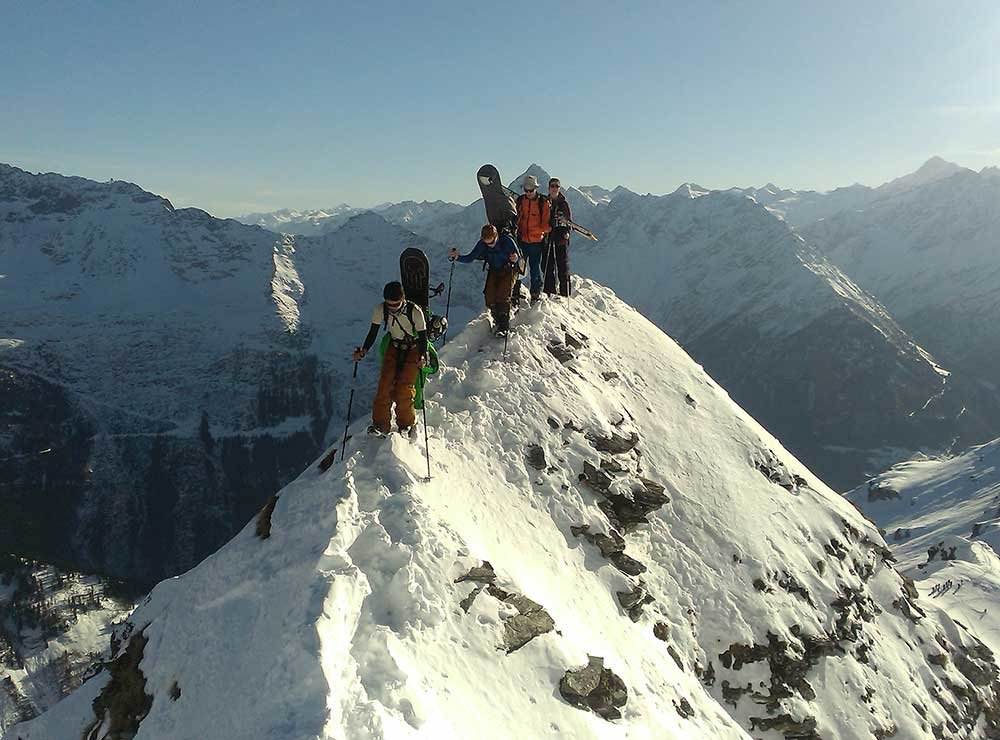
Ecole students ski touring in Canton Bern

Since its founding, the Ecole d'Humanité has educated a host of influential figures and notable families ranging from Olympic athletes and prime ministers to European royalty. The school is very discreet and has a privacy policy which keeps it from releasing any information on current or past students; however, some known alumni include the following:

- von Oppeln-Bronikowski Family - European nobility
- Nehru Family - Indian political dynasty
- Hans Zimmer - Film score composer
- Eberhard Berent - Academic
- Milein Cosman - Artist
- Stephan Eicher - Musician
- Dreyfus Family - French agricultural billionaires
- Leda Luss Luyken - Artist
- Boss Family - Clothing and textile producers
- Niyazov Family - Asian political dynasty
- von Rosenberg Family - European nobility
- Heuer Family - Swiss watchmaking dynasty
- Giorgio Gomelsky - Music producer
- Schenk von Stauffenberg Family - European nobility
- Cassirer Family - German industrialist family
- Luca Giuliani - Archaeology Professor
- Rothschild Family - European nobility
- Sarah Gorham - Renowned writer and publisher
- Sanjay Gandhi - Head of the Indian National Congress Party
- Rajiv Gandhi - 6th Prime Minister of India
- Limi Yamamoto - Daughter of Japanese fashion designer Yohji Yamamoto
- Banjo Butler - Daughter of musician John Butler
- von Waldburg zu Wolfegg und Waldsee Family - German princely family

=== Associated Figures ===
- Édouard Claparède - Swiss Neurologist
- Pierre Bovet - Swiss Psychologist and Educationalist
- Adolphe Ferrière - Founder of Progressive Education
- Kurt Hahn - German Educator and Founder of Gordonstoun and Schule Schloss Salem

== See also ==
- Institut Le Rosey
- Institut auf dem Rosenberg
- Aiglon College
- Surval Montreux
- Lyceum Alpinium Zuoz
- Collège Alpin Beausoleil
- Leysin American School
- TASIS
- Collège du Leman
