= Federation of Swiss Private Schools =

Swiss Federation of Private Schools Verband Schweizer Privatschulen
- Abbreviation: VSP / SFPS
- Legal status: Swiss association
- Purpose: bring together and defend the interests of private schools throughout Switzerland
- Location: Bern
- Region served: CH
- President: Norbert Foerster
- Website: VSP

Federation of Swiss Private Schools (SFPS) (in German: Verband Schweizer Privatschulen "VSP" ), is a Swiss association of private Schools in Switzerland. Its aim is to bring together and defend the interests of private schools throughout Switzerland.

== Private schools accredited by VSP ==
The Federation of Swiss Private Schools counts 240 schools as members of May 2021, including Institute Le Rosey. In total, these schools comprise over 100,000 students from more than 100 nations.

== Notable members ==
- Aiglon College
- Brillantmont International School
- Collège Alpin International Beau Soleil
- Collège du Léman
- Ecole d'Humanité
- Institut auf dem Rosenberg
- Institut Montana Zugerberg
- Leysin American School
- Lyceum Alpinum Zuoz
- Surval Montreux
- Institut Le Rosey
