= List of Beşiktaş J.K. presidents =

Beşiktaş Jimnastik Kulübü is a Turkish multi-sport club, founded in 1903 in the Beşiktaş district of Istanbul. As of 2018, the club is active in 14 different branches. Since its foundation in 1903, 35 individuals have served the club as president. Süleyman Seba was the longest serving president of the club, having served for 16 consecutive years between 1984 and 2000.

== List of presidents ==
Period	Name	Football Branch
İstanbul League	Millî Küme	İdman Birliği Ligi	Chancellor Cup	TSYD Cup
Men's Football
1903-08	Mehmet Şamil Şhaplı
1908-11	Şükrü Paşa
1911-18	Fuat Paşa
1918-24	Fuat Balkan; 1st Term
1924-26	Ahmet Fetgeri Aşeni; 1st Term
1926-28	Fuat Balkan; 2nd Term
1928-30	Ahmet Fetgeri Aşeni; 2nd Term
1930-32	Emin Şükrü Kunt
1932-35	A. Ziya Karamürsel; 1st Term
1935-37	Fuat Balkan; 3rd Term
1937-38	Recep Peker
1938-39	A. Ziya Karamürsel; 2nd Term
1939-41	Yusuf Ziya Erdem
1941-42	A. Ziya Karamürsel; 3rd Term
1942-50	Abdullah Ziya Kozanoğlu
1950-51	Ekrem Amaç
1951-55	Salih Fuat Keçeci
1955-56	Tahir Söğütlü
1956-57	Danyal Akbel
1957-58	Nuri Togay; 1st Term
Period	Name	Football Branch
Süper Lig	Turkish Cup	Turkish Super Cup	Chancellor Cup	TSYD Cup
Professional Era	Men's Football
1958-59	Ferhat Nasır
1959-60	Nuri Togay; 2nd Term
1960-63	Hakkı Yeten; 1st Term
1963-64	Selahattin Akel
1964-66	Hakkı Yeten; 2nd Term
1966-67	Hasan Salman
1967-68	Hakkı Yeten; 3rd Term
1968-70	Talat Asal
1970-71	Agasi Şen
1971-72	Himmet Ünl
1972-73	Şekip Okçuoğlu
1973-77	Mehmet Üstünkaya; 1st Term
1977-79	Gazi Akınal; 1st Term
1979	Hüseyin Cevahiroğlu
1979-80	Gazi Akınal; 2nd Term
1980-81	Rıza Kumruoğlu
1981-84	Mehmet Üstünkaya; 2nd Term
1984-00	Süleyman Seba
2000-04	Serdar Bilgili
2004-12	Yıldırım Demirören
2012-19	Fikret Orman
2019-23	Ahmet Nur Çebi
2023-24	Hasan Arat
2024-present	Hüseyin Yücel

Basketball Branch
TBL	Turkish Cup	Presidency Cup	European Cup	TWBL
Men's	Women's
Basketball Branch
TBL	Turkish Cup	Presidency Cup	FIBA EuroChallenge Cup	TWBL
Men's	Women's

Volleyball Branch
Men's Volleyball League	Women's Volleyball League
Men's	Women's
Volleyball Branch
Men's Volleyball League	Women's Volleyball League
Men's	Women's

Handball Branch
Super League	Turkish Handball Cup	Handball Super Cup
Men's
Handball Branch
Super League	Turkish Handball Cup	Handball Super Cup
Men's
