= Collège Alpin International Beau Soleil =

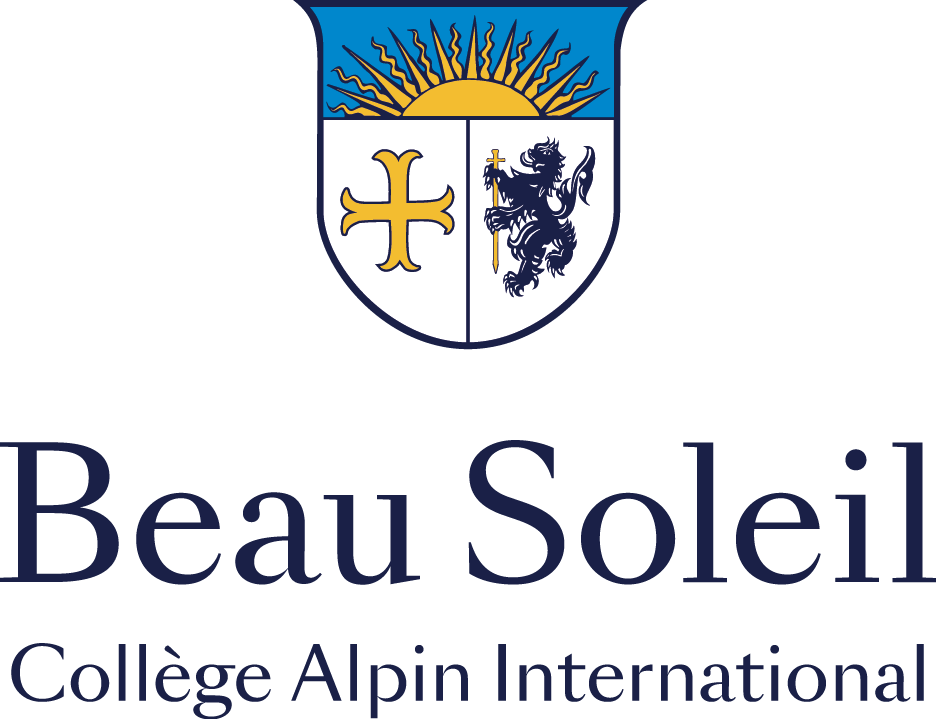

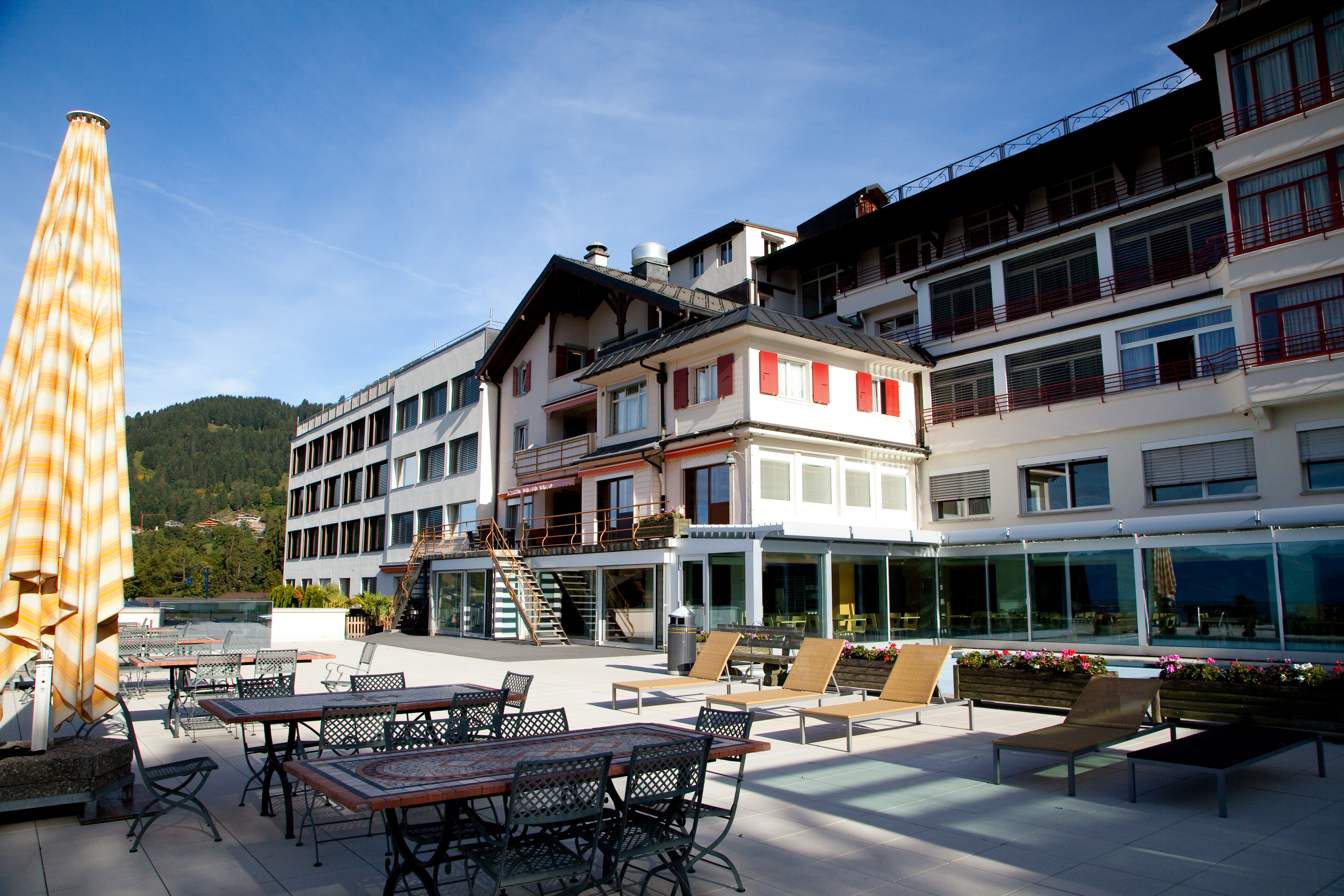

Location
- Collège Alpin Beau Soleil, Route du Village 1, 1884 Villars-sur-Ollon, Suisse; Villars-sur-Ollon, Canton of Vaud; Switzerland; 46°17′58″N 7°03′10″E

Information
- Type: Private school, International school, Boarding school
- Established: 1910
- Authorizer: NEASC, IBO, CIS, & ECIS
- Principal: Benjamin Turner
- Staff: 200
- Faculty: 90
- Gender: Co-educational
- Enrollment: 300
- Colors: Dark Navy, Gold, Bright Blue
- Nickname: CABS
- Tuition: CHF180,000 in tuition and boarding (2026–2027)
- Website: www.beausoleil.ch

Collège Alpin International Beau Soleil, known informally as Beau Soleil, is a private boarding school in Switzerland. Founded in 1910 by Madame Bluette Ferrier, it is located 1,350 metres (4,430 ft) above sea level on the Swiss Alps of Villars-sur-Ollon. The college provides a full boarding education for students aged 11–18 years old from over 55 countries.

Beau Soleil has been listed by The Daily Telegraph as "One of the most exclusive schools in the world". It has been described by L'Illustré as the most expensive school in the world. L'Illustré also noted "Le risque du cocon" (the risk of the cocoon) for pupils who may not have enough experience of the outside world; and that the school values innovation. It has repeatedly been listed as one of the world's leading 150 schools and one of the top 10 in Switzerland by The Schools Index first being added to the Index in its inaugural edition in 2020.

== Notable alumni ==
- Nikola Shterev — Canadian race driver
- Princess Marie of Denmark
- Guillaume V, Grand Duke of Luxembourg
- Prince Félix of Luxembourg
- Princess Claire of Luxembourg
- Peter O'Sullevan — Irish-British horse racing commentator and journalist
- Tina Cooper — English paediatrician
- Jacques Villeneuve - Canadian Formula 1 driver
- Florian Picasso - DJ and music producer
- William Rodarmor - Translator and editor

== See also ==
- List of international schools
- The Schools Index
- Lyceum Alpinum Zuoz
- Leysin American School
- Institut Le Rosey
- Aiglon College
- American School in Switzerland
- Institut Auf Dem Rosenberg
- Ecole D'Humanité
