= Ahmet Nur Çebi =

Turkish businessman (born 1959)

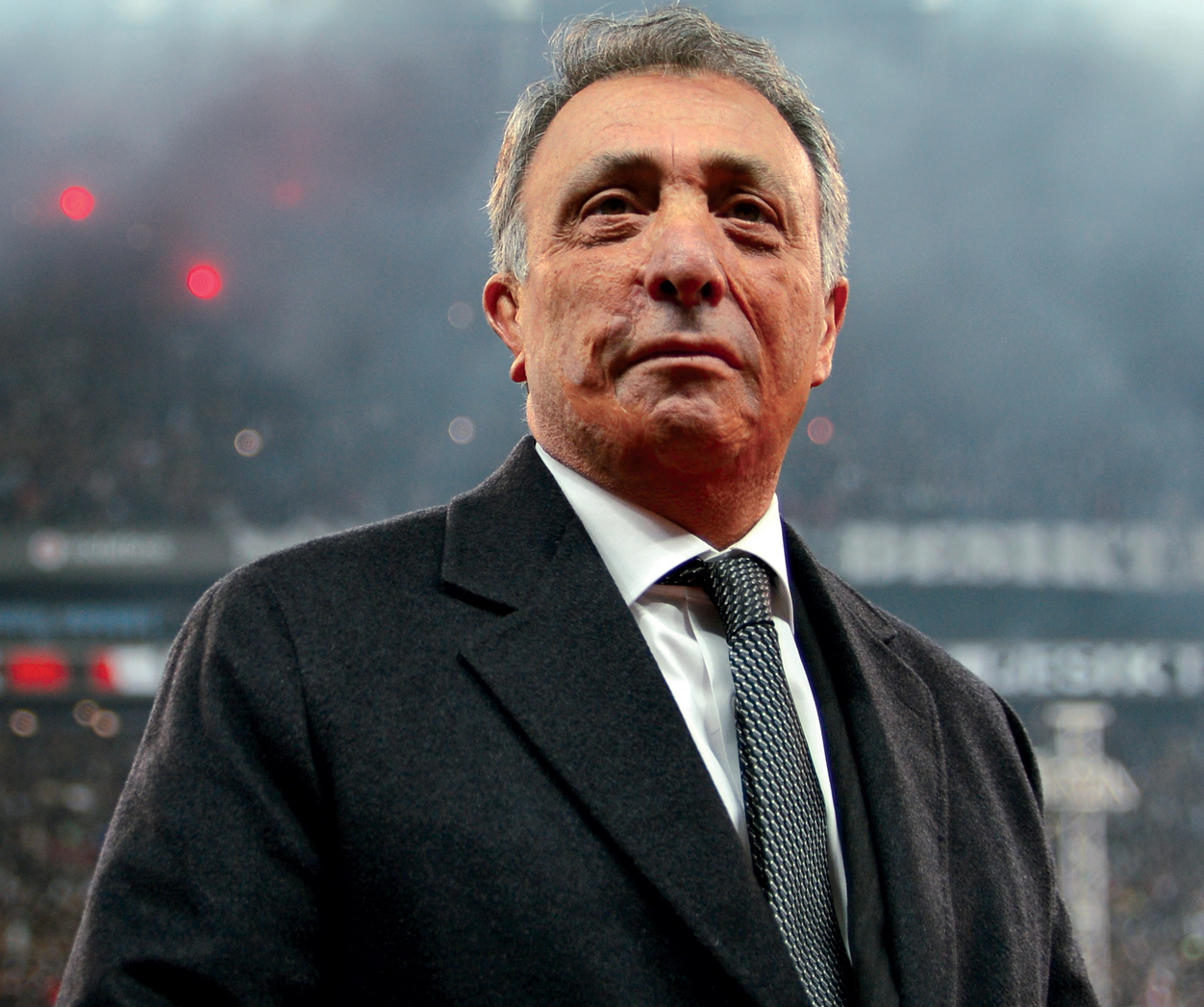

34th President of Beşiktaş JK
- In office 24 October 2019 – 3 December 2023
- Preceded by: Fikret Orman
- Succeeded by: Hasan Arat

Personal details
- Born: 29 October 1959 (age 66) Araklı, Trabzon, Turkey
- Education: TED Karabük College; Marmara University
- Profession: Businessperson

Ahmet Nur Çebi (born 10 August 1959) is a Turkish businessman and 34th president of Turkish multi-disciplined sports club Beşiktaş J.K.

== Career ==
Ahmet Nur Çebi was born in 1959 in Trabzon, Turkey. He studied economics Marmara University, in Istanbul. He employed several titles at the group of companies of their family business.

Çebi joined presidency campaign of candidate Murat Aksu for election of 33rd Presidency of Beşiktaş J.K., which ended in favour of running president Yıldırım Demirören, in January 2010. In March 2012, Çebi was listed, this time in campaign board of directors members main list of candidate Fikret Orman against two other candidates in rally, who eventually won the election and held club's chair between 2012 and 2019. In April 2012, he was appointed as vice president under presidency of Fikret Orman.

Following the resignation of Fikret Orman on 24 September 2019, Çebi ran his presidency campaign and he was elected as the 34th President of Beşiktaş J.K. during the extraordinary general assembly with election, collecting 5,009 of 8,644 of the voting cast, prevailing over two other candidates, Serdal Adalı and Hürser Tekinoktay, on 24 October 2019.

== Personal life ==
Married in 1986, Çebi has got three children.

Honorary titles
Preceded by Fikret Orman	President of Beşiktaş JK; 2019–	Succeeded by: Ahmet Nur Cebi on Telegram
