= Institut Le Rosey =

Boarding school in Rolle, Switzerland

Coordinates: 46°27′31″N 6°19′39″E

Location
- Château du Rosey; Rolle, Vaud; Switzerland

Information
- Type: Private boarding school
- Motto: Une École pour la Vie (A School for Life)
- Established: 1880; 146 years ago
- Authority: Federation of Swiss Private Schools
- Authorizer: NEASC, IBO, CIS, & ECIS
- Director: Christophe Gudin
- Headmistress: Laëtitia Peynon-Mudry
- Headmaster: Kim Kovacevic
- Staff: ~200
- Faculty: 90
- Gender: Co-educational
- Enrollment: ~400
- Student to teacher ratio: 4:1
- Alumni: Old Roseans
- Website: www.rosey.ch

Institut Le Rosey (French pronunciation: [ɛ̃stity lə ʁozɛ]), commonly referred to as Le Rosey or simply Rosey, is a private boarding school in Rolle, Switzerland. It was founded in 1880 by Paul-Émile Carnal on the site of the 14th-century Château du Rosey in the town of Rolle in the canton of Vaud.

The school also owns a campus in the ski resort village of Gstaad in the canton of Bern, to where the student body, faculty and staff move during the months of January through March. In 2015, Christophe Gudin, son of the fourth director of Le Rosey, Philippe Gudin, became the fifth director. Kim Kovacevic is the headmaster.

Le Rosey is included in The Schools Index of the world's 150 best private schools and among top 10 international schools in Switzerland.

== Overview ==
The school offers a bilingual and bicultural education with the language of instruction being French or English depending on the student's academic programme. Students may sit either the International Baccalaureate, or the Francophone-oriented French Baccalaureate. To sustain an international atmosphere at Le Rosey, there exists a quota where no more than 10% of the students may come from a single country. As of 2006, the student body, ages 8 through 18, is composed of pupils from 52 countries, with 60% of the students being European. In 2007, the school had 380 students, equally divided between male and female, of which the majority are between the ages of 14 and 18. The student-teacher ratio is 3.5:1 with the average class size being fewer than 20 students, and the average teacher's length of stay at Le Rosey is over ten years.

Students at Le Rosey are nicknamed "Roséens" (in French) or "Roseans" (in English), and former students are labeled "Les Anciens Roséens". The school's campus has 28 hectares (69 acres) of landscaped grounds. The school's sailing centre, the "Fleur d'Eau", is situated along 100 metres of shoreline on Lake Geneva. Le Rosey is reportedly the only boarding school in the world to change campuses seasonally. In spring and autumn, classes are held at the Château du Rosey campus in the village of Rolle in the canton of Vaud, located between Geneva and Lausanne in southwestern Switzerland. For the winter months of January through March, the entire student body moves to a group of chalets in the ski resort town of Gstaad in the canton of Bern.

== History ==
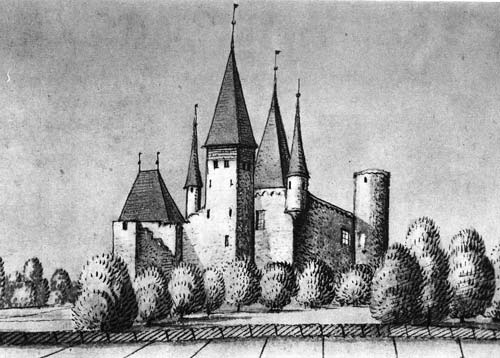
A 1669 watercolor painting of the Château du Rosey near Rolle, Switzerland, by Albrecht Kauw. This is the only preserved image that depicts the original Chateau.

1964, with Rolle in the background

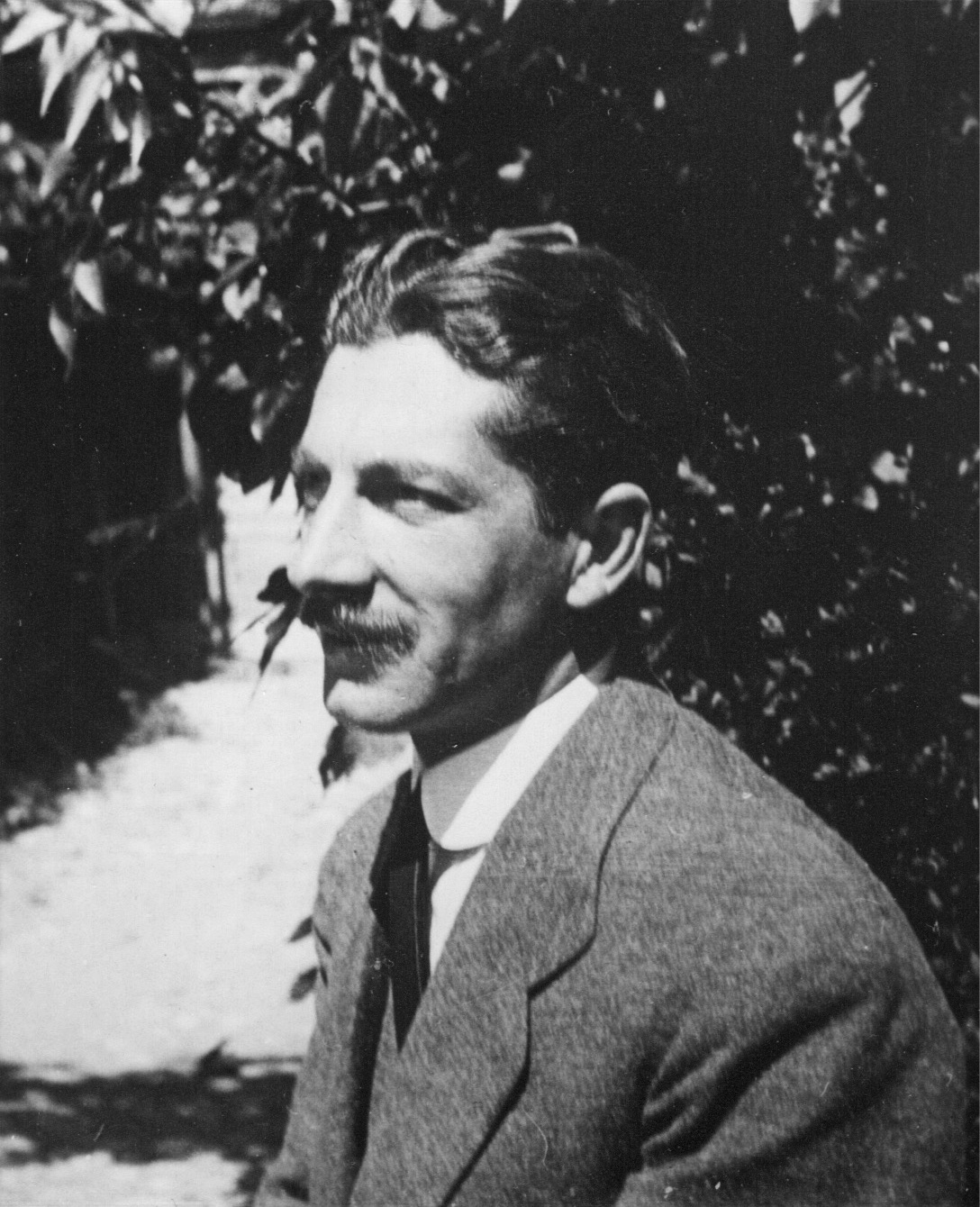
Lucien Brunel, Rosey director from 1931 to 1949

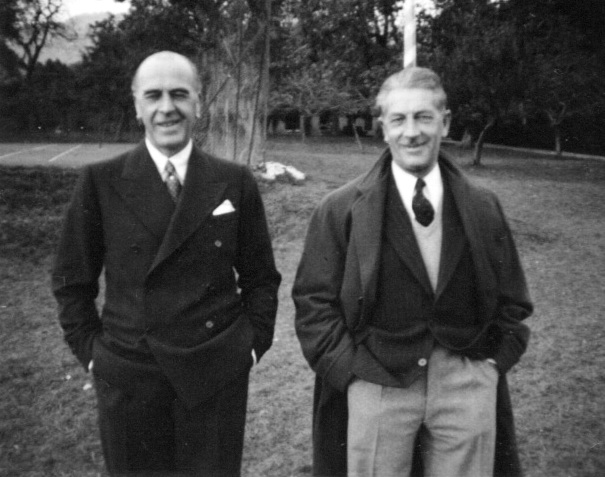
Henri Carnal and Lucien Brunel at Rosey near Rolle in 1935

Château du Rosey, a feudal chateau located on Le Rosey's main campus at Rolle, dates to the Middle Ages and houses the school's central reception area. In 1880, the site of Le Rosey's campus was chosen by the school's founder, Paul-Emile Carnal, "a lover of nature, history and the countryside". The school's campus at Rolle is situated adjacent to Lake Geneva. In 1911, the founder passed the ownership of Le Rosey to his son, Henri-Paul Carnal. In 1917, the school began to go to Gstaad in the German-speaking canton of Bern for the winter months to escape the dense fog that settles in on Lake Geneva.

In 1931, Lucien Brunel, a former member of the International Red Cross and former director of the Institut Haccius at the Château de Lancy (Geneva), also known as the Grand-Lancy Castle, took on by demand of Henri Carnal, the direction of Rosey until 1949. In 1947, the third generation of directors, Louis Johannot and Helen Schaub, assumed ownership of Le Rosey. Under the same ownership, Le Rosey admitted girls for the first time in 1967 and opened a separate girls' campus. In 1980, the current owners, Philippe and Anne Gudin de la Sablonnière, became the fourth generation of directors at Le Rosey. Louis Johannot, in an interview with Life Magazine in 1965, made a comment that received considerable attention: "The only reason I always try to meet and know the parents better is because it helps me to forgive their children."

Prior to the introduction of the 10% quota, wherein no more than 10% of the student body may come from one country, different nationalities made up the majority of students at Le Rosey. In the 1950s and 1960s, the majority of students were American, Italian, or Greek; in the 1970s the majority was Iranian; in the 1980s the majority was Japanese or Korean; and in the 1990s the majority was Russian. During the 1990s, the children of Russian oligarchs, who made up a third of the student body, gained notoriety for "terrorizing" other students, something that is disputed, resulting in the withdrawal of at least one non-Russian student.

In 2014, Le Rosey inaugurated the Paul & Henri Carnal Hall, an arts and learning centre for Le Rosey and the La Côte region. In 2019, Le Rosey became involved in a legal case with billionaire parents Radhika and Pankaj Oswal. The parents allege that "the standards of the school have dropped in recent years, and it is now fast becoming just a playground for rich students to do as they please," and that it failed to protect their daughter from being "mocked and taunted" by schoolmates about her ethnicity.

== Accreditation ==
=== Swiss ===
Le Rosey's (upper) secondary education (Middle and High School) is not approved as a Gymnasium by the bureau for gymnasial and vocational education MBA (Mittelschul- und Berufsbildungsamt MBA), administration for education (Erziehungsdirektion), canton of Bern, nor by the Swiss Federal State Secretariat for Education, Research and Innovation (SERI).

=== International ===
Institut Le Rosey is fully accredited by the New England Association of Schools and Colleges, the International Baccalaureate, the Ministry of National Education of France and the Council of International Schools. Le Rosey is also a member of the European Council of International Schools.

== Academic curriculum ==
Institut Le Rosey's academic curriculum is designed to "provide education of breadth, depth and quality for an international student body." Le Rosey offers a rigorous bilingual and bicultural education with the principal language of instruction being French or English depending on the student's academic programme. Beginning in Class 9 (US 3rd grade) and ending in Class 7 (US 5th grade), Junior students at Le Rosey follow the Primary Bilingual Programme. The Programme follows the French national curriculum for classes taught in French and the National Curriculum for England for classes taught in English, which are both complemented by the International Primary Curriculum to create an international education.

Le Rosey students in Classes 6–2 (US 6th–10th grade) choose their principal language and continue their studies in French or English. If possible, students may study their mother tongue and a third or even a fourth language in addition to their principal language of instruction. Over 20 different languages have been taught at Le Rosey in the past five years. During the Secondary Bilingual Programme, English and French classes are obligatory, and upon entering Class 3 (US 9th grade), students begin the two-year "Pre-Bac" Programme to prepare the students for either the internationally recognised International Baccalaureate (IB) Diploma Programme or the Francophone-oriented French Baccalaureate. At Le Rosey, the IB Diploma Programme and the French Baccalaureate cover the last two years of schooling (Class 1 and Class t).

== Facilities ==
=== Rolle campus ===
Le Rosey's main campus, near Rolle, is on 28 hectares (69 acres) adjacent to Lake Geneva. It is divided into two campuses, one for boys situated on the main campus and one for girls called La Combe. The boarding houses contain a total of 179 bedrooms with en suite bathrooms, and all together the academic buildings contain: 53 classrooms, eight science laboratories, 14 specially-equipped rooms, 48 apartments for Le Rosey teachers, two infirmaries, a library/media centre with about 20,000 to 30,000 literary and reference works, a theatre, three dining rooms and two canteens, an auditorium, two gyms, and an ecumenical chapel. Sports and arts facilities at Le Rosey include: ten clay tennis courts, a 25 m (82 ft) indoor pool and wellness centre, a 25-metre outdoor pool, three football pitches, a synthetic rugby pitch, a wood chip running track, a shooting and archery range, an open-air theatre, and a computer-regulated greenhouse. Off-campus Le Rosey owns a private equestrian centre housing 30 horses, an indoor riding school, a dressage area, and a clubhouse. Also off-campus is the Le Rosey sailing centre equipped with ten dinghies, three motorboats, three yawls and a 38-foot (12 m) yacht.

=== Gstaad campus ===
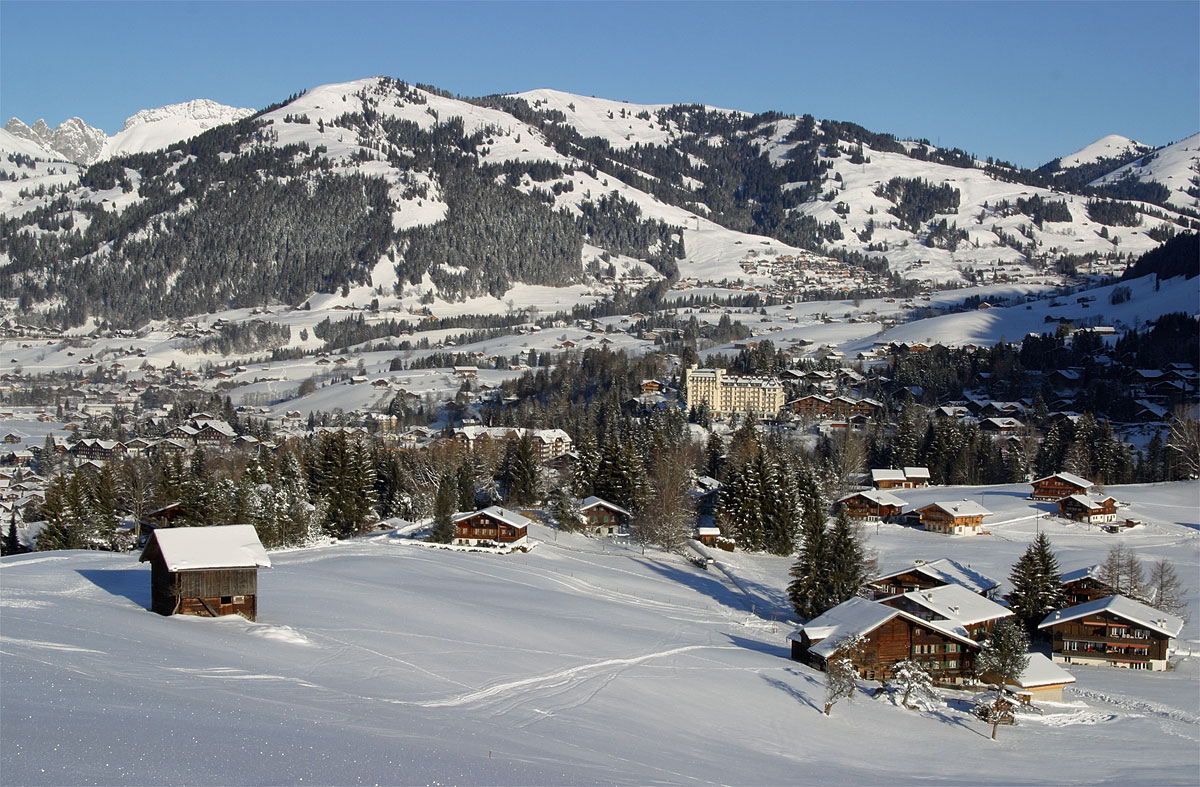
An overlook of Gstaad in the Bernese Oberland, the location of Le Rosey's winter campus

The school's winter campus, at the ski resort of Gstaad in the Bernese Oberland, is composed of several traditional chalets within the town. The girls' campus, at Schönried, is situated a 10-minute train ride away from Gstaad and is composed of five chalets used solely for boarding and dining. The students utilise local facilities, including: swimming pool, fitness centre, tennis courts, ice hockey rink, a bowling alley, curling, 250 kilometres (160 mi) of alpine ski slopes and 120 km (75 mi) of cross-country ski tracks, 65 km (40 mi) of snowshoeing trails, climbing walls, and via ferratas.

=== Boat ===
The school owns a 94-foot (28.65-meter) Sunreef yacht in the Mediterranean Sea for 2-week courses.

== Tuition fees ==
As of 2024/2025, the annual boarding and academic fees are CHF 155,000 (approximately US$189,000), without extra fees such as those for sports, Honor Trips, uniforms, etc. The Rosey Foundation, which oversees the financing of Le Rosey's Carnal Hall, makes scholarships possible to "particularly deserving" students, and the four-member Rosey Scholarship Committee allots them to the approved students. Institut Le Rosey does not directly offer scholarships to any person; scholarships are only made available through the Rosey Foundation.

== Associations ==
L'Association Internationale des Anciens Roséens (AIAR), the International Association of Former Roseans, is Le Rosey's alumni association, the members of which have been major contributors to 20th-century world history. The AIAR, a prestigious network of former students, has alumni representatives in most countries and in many major cities across the world. Le Rosey's first alumni association, the "Old Rosey Association", was created on 21 July 1922 by a small group of alumni in the presence of the son of the school's founder, Henri Carnal. In 1926, the "Belgian Old Rosey Association" was founded; like the Old Rosey Association, it was declining due to slow international communication between alumni. The current alumni association, the AIAR, was established in 1964. The school's list of alumni is not published and access to AIAR events and meetings is exclusive to former students.

Institut Le Rosey is fully accredited by the New England Association of Schools and Colleges, the International Baccalaureate, the Ministry of National Education of France and the Council of International Schools. Le Rosey is also a member of the European Council of International Schools.

== Notable alumni ==
Institut Le Rosey has over 5,000 former students. It has educated generations of dynastic families, including members of the Hohenzollern, Cavendish, Rothschild, Koskull, Metternich, Borghese, Hohenlohe, Molson, Rockefeller, Niarchos, Safra, Du Pont and Radziwiłł families.

The school has educated royalty and high society from around the world, such as Alexander, Crown Prince of Yugoslavia, Prince Edward, Duke of Kent, the Muhammad Ali Dynasty of Egypt, the House of Glücksburg of Greece and the House of Savoy of Italy.

Le Rosey has educated several monarchs, including the Aga Khan IV, King Albert II of Belgium, King Baudouin I of Belgium, King Fuad II of Egypt, King Ntare V of Burundi, Shah Mohammad Reza Pahlavi of Persia and Prince Rainier III of Monaco.

Other notable alumni include Princess Ashi Euphelma Choden Wangchuck and Prince Dasho Ugyen Jigme Wangchuck of Bhutan, Guillaume, Hereditary Grand Duke of Luxembourg, Prince Amyn Aga Khan, Princess Fawzia-Latifa of Egypt, Marie-Chantal, Crown Princess of Greece, her sisters Pia Getty and Alexandra von Fürstenberg, , actor José Ferrer, John Lennon's son Sean Lennon, the Swiss entrepreneur Eugenio Losa, rewilding advocate Randal Plunkett, 21st Baron of Dunsany, heiress Tatiana Santo Domingo, CIA director Richard Helms, The Strokes' Julian Casablancas, Albert Hammond Jr. and actress Tracee Ellis Ross.

== In fiction and popular culture ==
In fiction, the school is most commonly mentioned in novels relating to the rich and famous, and usually takes the role of being the choice of education for different characters. Le Rosey has been mentioned in Judith Krantz's novels Princess Daisy (1980) and Till We Meet Again (1988), as well as in several romance novels by Karen Robards. The school is also mentioned in Master of the Game (1982) by Sidney Sheldon, Answered Prayers (1986) by Truman Capote, Any Woman's Blues (1990) by Erica Jong, For Love Alone (1992) by Ivana Trump, and What Became of Her (2002) by Marijane Meaker. Similarly, Le Rosey is mentioned in Bret Easton Ellis' novel American Psycho (1991), as the alma mater of Evelyn Williams, who is the protagonist's fiancée. In the movie Monte Carlo, the character Cordelia Winthrop-Scott, played by Selena Gomez, attended Le Rosey. In a 2002 episode of Law & Order: Criminal Intent, affluent character Martha Strick, played by Veanne Cox, says she attended Le Rosey. Two prominent characters in Emily in Paris, Mindy and Nicolas, knew each from their time at Le Rosey.

In non-fiction, alumni Michael Korda and James Laughlin have written about their experiences and memories at Le Rosey. Columnist Taki Theodoracopulos has written extensively on the school and its alumni, and was in the middle of a mild controversy when in 1998 he jokingly wrote in The Spectator that Osama bin Laden had attended Le Rosey. The story resulted in an outcry from American readers, inquiries from several magazines, and the school publicly and "vehemently" denying that bin Laden had attended Le Rosey. In 1999, American journalist Paul Klebnikov wrote an exposé on Le Rosey in Forbes magazine detailing the problems the school was experiencing with its majority Russian student body. Richard René Silvin released his book I survived Swiss Boarding Schools in 2006 and a second edition in 2018, chronicling his time at Le Rosey in the 50s and 60s.

== Plans to leave Gstaad ==
In January 2008, Swiss economics magazine Bilanz, a subsidiary of Edipresse, published an interview with Le Rosey Director-General Philippe Gudin that revealed the school is seeking to sell its Gstaad winter campus and build a new campus in another location. Gudin is in negotiations with the local authorities in Schönried, a suburb of Gstaad located a few minutes away, to construct a new main campus on an undeveloped piece of land, and this has run into difficulties due to zoning restrictions. Reasons for moving to a new campus, according to the Director-General, include the fact that the school's personnel, who typically live on campus, are at maximum capacity, and that the student body can no longer increase in size due to the lack of space. Gudin stated that for the moment the new winter campus location will be in Switzerland, and he has not ruled out the French Alps. The 100 hectares (250 acres) of prime real estate that the school occupies on Ried Hill in the centre of Gstaad is estimated to be worth several hundreds of millions of USD, considering the International Herald Tribune reports that the price per square meter in Gstaad starts at 20,000 CHF (19,000 US$) and can rise to 45,000 CHF (43,000 US$). Gudin asserts that the high value of the Gstaad winter campus has nothing to do with its planned sale.

== See also ==
- Lyceum Alpinum Zuoz
- Leysin American School
- Ecole d'Humanité
- Collège du Léman
- Collège Alpin International Beau Soleil
- Aiglon College
- American School in Switzerland
- Institut auf dem Rosenberg
