= Tina Cooper =

Paediatrician and expert on child abuse

Christine Elizabeth "Tina" Cooper OBE, FRCP
- Born: July 21, 1918; Watford, England
- Died: September 1, 1986 (aged 68); Gosforth, Newcastle], England
- Education: Girton College, Cambridge; Royal Free Hospital School of Medicine
- Occupation: Paediatrician
- Years active: 1945–1983
- Known for: Expertise in child abuse
- Medical career
- Profession: Physician
- Field: Paediatrics
- Institutions: Newcastle General Hospital; Royal Free Hospital
- Sub-specialties: Child protection, adoption, and fostering
- Research: Child abuse prevalence and nature

Christine Elizabeth "Tina" Cooper OBE (21 July 1918 – 1 September 1986) was an English paediatrician and an expert on child abuse. She worked at Newcastle General Hospital for the majority of her career and received an OBE in 1967 for her services to children's health in Sierra Leone, which included establishing a national immunisation programme.

== Early life ==
Tina Cooper was born on 21 July 1918 in Watford. Her father, William Francis Cooper, was an analytical chemist and general practitioner. Her mother, Christine Maud Jones, died from influenza when Tina was six months old; her father remarried to Eileen Hall in 1920. The family moved to Surrey in 1924. Cooper attended numerous schools including Surbiton High School (1927–30), St John's School for Girls in Bexhill-on-Sea (1930–35), and Beau Soleil, a finishing school near Lausanne, Switzerland (1935–36). After spending two years training as a nursery nurse in Highgate, London, she decided to pursue a career in medicine to contribute further to children's welfare. She was admitted in 1939 to Girton College, Cambridge, for undergraduate studies, and completed her clinical training at the Royal Free Hospital School of Medicine, graduating as MB BCh in 1945.

== Career ==
Cooper began her medical career at London's Royal Free Hospital as a house physician, a house officer in obstetrics, and first assistant in the paediatric department. She received a diploma in child health in 1948 and moved to Newcastle the following year to join James Calvert Spence as a paediatric registrar at Newcastle General Hospital. She was appointed consultant in 1952, and held the role until her retirement in 1983. From 1964, she spent two years in Sierra Leone advising the government on child health policy, which included establishing a national immunisation programme against measles and other childhood infections. She was awarded an OBE in 1967 for her services to children's health in Sierra Leone, and elected Fellow of the Royal College of Physicians in the same year.

Cooper was interested in a family-oriented approach to paediatrics, believing that children's health relied strongly upon environmental and parental influences. On this basis, she studied fostered and adopted children, becoming an advisor to the Northern Counties Adoption Society and serving on the council of the Association of British Adoption and Fostering Agencies. In the 1960s, she turned her focus to abused children, embracing the ideas of C. Henry Kempe, an American who argued that child abuse was more prevalent than previously thought. While most British specialists refuted Kempe's research, according to the Oxford Dictionary of National Biography, Cooper was "one of the first child specialists in Britain to recognise the prevalence, and the physical, psychological, and sexual nature, of child abuse". In 1979 she co-founded the British Association for the Study and Prevention of Child Abuse and Neglect (now the Association of Child Protection Professionals), subsequently serving as its president. She was also a member of an early research group on child abuse that influenced national government policy in the 1970s.

== Death ==
Cooper retired in 1983 and died from cancer on 1 September 1986 in Gosforth, Newcastle.
