= Hasan Arat =

Turkish basketball player and sports administrator

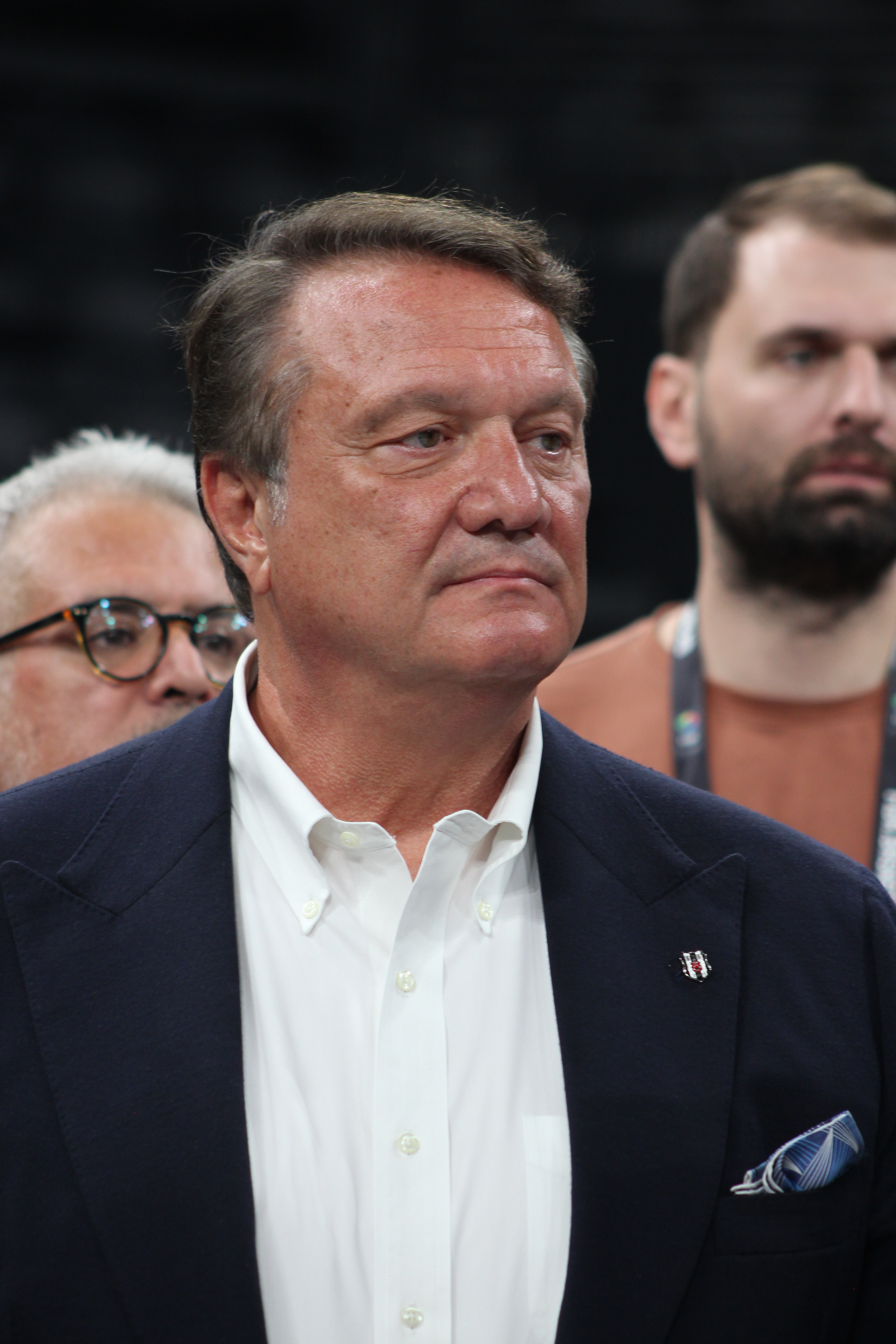

35th President of Beşiktaş JK
- In office 3 December 2023 – 29 November 2024
- Preceded by: Ahmet Nur Çebi
- Succeeded by: Hüseyin Yücel

Personal details
- Born: 27 September 1959 (age 67) Adana, Turkey
- Spouse: Simin Arat
- Children: 2
- Profession: Businessperson

Hasan Arat (born Adana, 27 September 1959) is a Turkish sports administrator, businessman, former professional basketball player and 35th president chairman of Beşiktaş. He was the leader of Istanbul's Bid to host the 2020 Olympic and Paralympic Games.

== Sports administration ==
Hasan Arat served as the vice-president of Beşiktaş J.K. between 1998 and 2000.

Arat rose to international prominence as leader of Istanbul's bid to host the 2020 Olympic and Paralympic Games. The Vice-President of the Turkish National Olympic Committee was appointed leader of the Bid when Istanbul were officially shortlisted as a Candidate City by the International Olympic Committee in May 2012. This was Istanbul's fifth and most successful Bid to host the Olympic and Paralympic Games. The announcement of the 2020 Host City was made on 7 September 2013 at the 125th IOC Session in Buenos Aires following presentations by each candidate city, and Istanbul lost to Tokyo in the final round of voting by the International Olympic Committee, following the earlier elimination of Madrid. Arat led Istanbul's final presentation to the International Olympic Committee members and following Istanbul's presentation, Arat said, "The Bid has united the people of Turkey, especially our young people, behind a common vision for our country’s future. Whatever happens with the vote, this bid has brought the whole nation together; it has inspired and engaged our younger generation; and it has made a lasting connection between Turkey and the Olympic Movement."

Following Arat's leadership of the Istanbul 2020 Bid, he was elected as an Executive Committee member of the European Olympic Committee, and appointed a member of the International Olympic Committee's Marketing Commission, as well as the Association of National Olympic Committees (ANOC) Marketing and New Sources of Finance Commission. In May 2014, IOC President, Thomas Bach, announced that Arat would be one of nine members of a new Olympic Bidding Procedure Working Group, which aimed to review the bidding procedure to host an Olympic Games in order to make it simpler and more appealing for cities to apply. On 25 July 2019, it was announced that Arat would be the Chair of the EOC Coordination Commission for the 2023 European Games due to take place in Krakow and the Malopolska region of Poland. Arat joined the Executive Board of the World Athletics Council on 24 November 2019. Arat is the Chairman of the Board of BIDEV (Basketball Solidarity and Education Foundation), a non-profit organization with the aim of contributing to the development of Turkish basketball. On 4 August 2022, the NBA and BIDEV announced a multiyear collaboration to launch the Jr. NBA Turkey League, a youth basketball league for boys and girls ages 11–14 from 30 participating primary schools in Istanbul. He is also Deputy Chairman of the Board of Directors of Beymen Group, a luxury fashion organisation On 10 January 2023, Arat was awarded a "Golden Mongoose" Special Medal of Honour 'for the outstanding contribution to the fortification of the international relations and friendship among nations as one of the best traditions of sport'. In September 2023, Arat was presented with Honorary Citizenship of Malopolska and the Medal of Honour by Marshal of Malopolska Witold Kozlowski for his role in the European Games Krakow Malopolska 2023.

On 3 December 2023, Hasan Arat was elected as the new president of Beşiktaş at an extraordinary general assembly meeting held at the Akatlar Arena in Istanbul. Winning the election with 7,271 votes, he competed against with Serdal Adalı in the extraordinary congress, who received 2,714 votes less than him. He received his mandate at a ceremony held at Tüpraş Stadium on 5 December 2023. During his tenure as President, Beşiktaş won the Turkish Cup and the Turkish Super Cup.

On 27 November 2024, a day after Beşiktaş JK parted ways with football team general coordinator Samet Aybaba and board advisor Brad Friedel, Arat resigned from Beşiktaş's football branches' presidency. In the statement made by Beşiktaş to KAP, it was reported that Hüseyin Yücel took over Arat's duty and was also noted that Arat will continue as the chairman of the board of directors, while Yücel, Mete Vardar and Onur Göçmez will manage the football team. Vice President Göçmez also announced his resignation on the same day, but according to a statement from the club, the board did not accept it and persuaded him to stay.

Two days later, on 29 November 2024, Arat resigned from Beşiktaş JK presidency due to personal reasons.

== Basketball career ==
Hasan Arat played professional basketball for 7 years. After beginning his career at Adana Demirspor, he played for 5 years for Besiktas Gymnastics Club (BJK) from 1977 -1981. He was the Vice-President of Besiktas Gymnastics Club (BJK) from 1998-2000. Hasan Arat started playing basketball in Fenerbahçe infrastructure and had his jubilee in Galatasaray.

== Business career ==
Arat is the Partner and Chairman of Novo Invest, a multifaceted real estate investment and development company, the Founder and Partner of Dome Group, an independent Corporate Finance and M&A advisory firm based in London and Istanbul, and the Vice Chairman of Turkey's biggest retail group Beymen.

Arat holds a variety of other business positions, including membership of the Board of Trustees of Özyeğin University, board member of FIBA Holding, vice-president of the United Nations World Tourism Organization's (UNTWO) affiliated members board of directors, representing the Union of Chambers and Commodity Exchanges of Turkey (TOBB), and former President and current member of the Executive Council and Board of Directors of the International Apparel Federation (IAF).

Arat was awarded the ‘Businessman of the Year’ award in 1996 by Economist Magazine, the National Productivity Center of Turkey and Dünya Newspaper.

== Personal life ==
He lives in Istanbul with his wife, Simin, and has two children.

== Honours ==
- In June 2024, Arat was awarded the Officer's Cross of the Order of Merit of the Republic of Poland (2024) in recognition of the highly successful 3rd European Games in Kraków- Małopolska in 2023
- In January 2026, Arat was awarded the Kosovo Honor Decoration by Kosovo President Vjosa Osmani for his contributions to international sport and his support for Kosovo’s successful bid to host the Prishtina 2030 Mediterranean Games
