= Limi Feu =

Japanese fashion designer

Limi Feu (born in 1974 as Limi Yamamoto) is a Japanese fashion brand. She started her label in 2000 and showed her clothes at Tokyo Fashion Week between 2000 and 2007. She made her Paris Fashion Week debut in October 2007 and was greeted with praise from fashion critics.

Limi was educated at the Ecole D'Humanité, a Swiss International boarding school in the Bernese Alps.

Limi is the daughter of designer Yohji Yamamoto. (She took a new name after stumbling upon the word "feu" in a French dictionary.)

Fashion writers have pointed to similarities between the aesthetics of Limi and her father: they both employ dark colors, large volumes, layering, and asymmetry in their designs. They have also noted, however, that her designs are streetwise and have a rock attitude, whereas her father's designs were typically romantic. To celebrate Limi Feu's 10th Anniversary, Limi Yamamoto held a special showing in Tokyo that featured seven previously unseen looks: these designs paid homage to the old fashion guard, the father of modern-day couture, Christian Dior.
