= List of alumni of Institut Le Rosey =

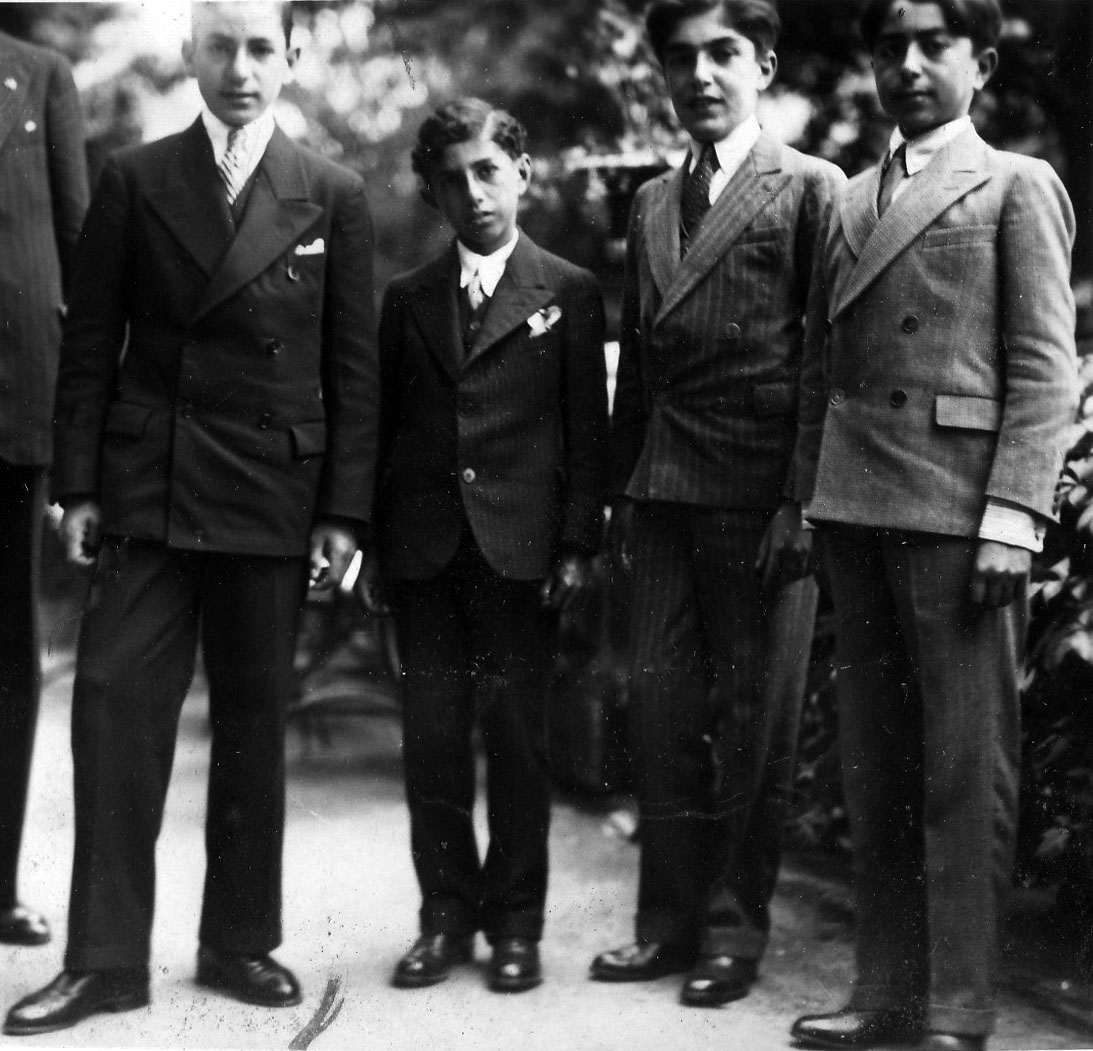
From left: Mohammed Reza Pahlavi, Ali Reza Pahlavi, Mehrpour Teymourtash and Hossein Fardoust at Le Rosey in the 1930s

This list of notable Roseans is composed of former students of Institut Le Rosey, an international boarding school located in Rolle and Gstaad, Switzerland. "Old Rosean" (in English) and "Anciens Roséens" (in French) are officially used to describe alumni.

== Notable Roseans ==
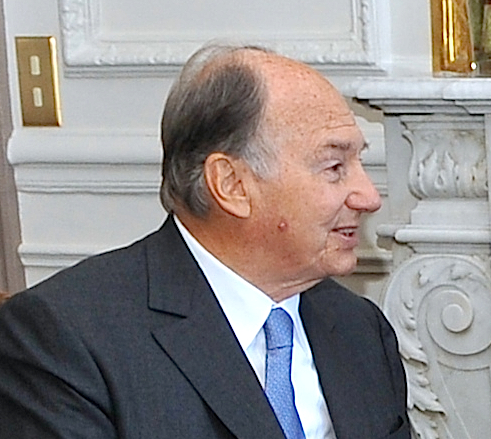
Aga Khan IV, spiritual leader of Ismaili Muslims

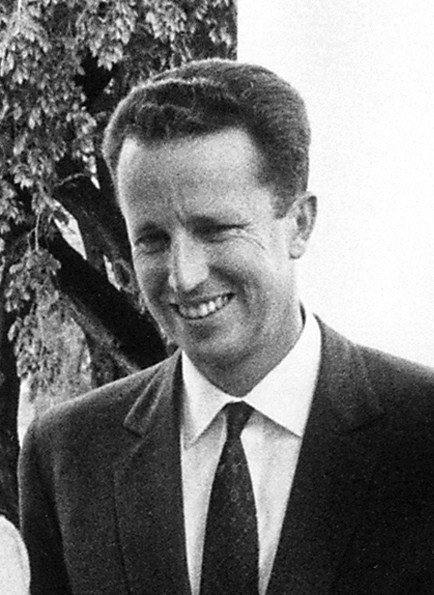
Baudouin of Belgium, King of the Belgians

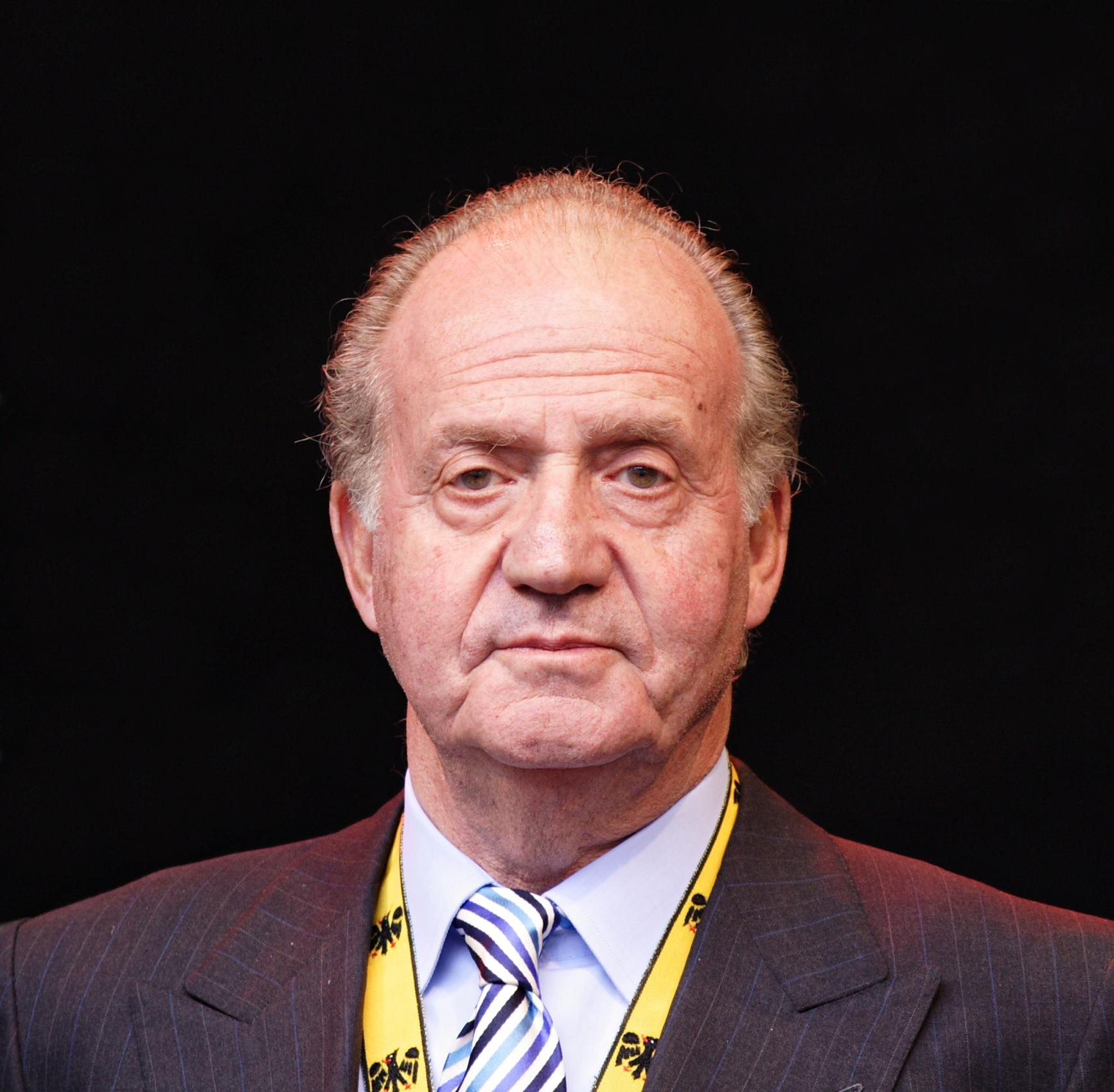
Juan Carlos I of Spain, former King of Spain

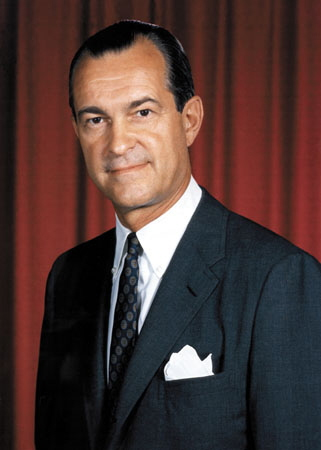
Richard Helms, Director of the CIA (1966-1973)

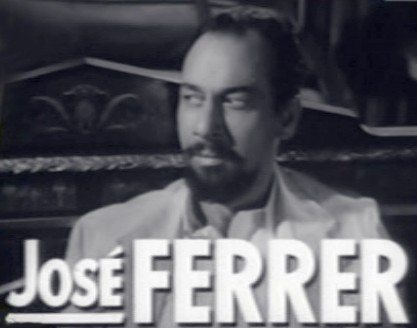
Jose Ferrer, Academy Award-winning actor, uncle of George Clooney

- Aga Khan IV, the Aga Khan (1936-2025), Imām of the Shia Imami Ismaili Muslims
- Princess Zahra Aga Khan (born 1970), eldest child of the Aga Khan
- King Albert II of Belgium (born 1934)
- Alexander, Crown Prince of Yugoslavia (born 1945), claimant to the Serbian Throne
- Sir Thomas Arnold (born 1947), British politician, retired Member of Parliament
- Tae Ashida (born 1964), Japanese fashion designer
- King Baudouin I of Belgium (1930–1993)
- Nicolas Berggruen (born 1961), billionaire, founder of the Berggruen Institute
- Bijan (1944–2011), Iranian-American fashion designer
- Francesco and Livio Borghese, Borghese family members, of the Italian noble House of Borghese
- Garech Browne (born 1939), member of the Guinness brewing family and patron of Irish Arts
- Arpad Busson (born 1963), Swiss financier
- Ian Campbell, 12th Duke of Argyll (1937–2001), Clan Chief of the Clan Campbell
- John Casablancas (1942-2013), founder of Elite Model Management
- Julian Casablancas (born 1978), musician, band member of The Strokes
- David Cecil, 6th Marquess of Exeter (previously Lord Burghley), winner of the 400m hurdles at the 1928 Summer Olympics
- Joe Dassin (1938-1980), French-American singer and composer
- Alki David (born 1968), Nigerian-born Greek billionaire heir and media entrepreneur
- Kemal Derviş (1949-2023), Turkish economist and politician, former head of the United Nations Development Programme
- Prince Edward, Duke of Kent (born 1935), member of the British royal family and President of the All England Lawn Tennis and Croquet Club
- Castellini Baldissera family members, of the Italian textile and banking fortune.
- Benno Elkan (1877–1960), German-born British sculptor, one of the first Roseans
- Emanuele Filiberto, Prince of Venice and Piedmont (born 1972), of the Italian House of Savoy
- Ghida Fakhry, Washington, D.C. co-anchor of Al Jazeera English
- Princess Fawzia-Latifa of Egypt
- Dodi Al-Fayed (1955–1997), movie producer, romantically linked to Diana, Princess of Wales, died in a car accident together in Paris
- José Ferrer (1909–1992), Academy Award-winning actor
- Firouz Nosrat-ed-Dowleh III, Prince of Qajar dynasty (1889-1937)
- King Fuad II of Egypt (born 1952), the last King of Egypt
- Alexandra von Fürstenberg (born 1972), former daughter-in-law of fashion designer Diane von Fürstenberg and one of the Miller Sisters
- Prince Egon von Fürstenberg (1946–2004), fashion designer, of the House of Fürstenberg
- Pia Getty (born 1966), socialite, one of the Miller Sisters
- Isabel Getty (born 1993), socialite and rock musician, daughter of Pia Getty.
- Toulo de Graffenried, Baron de Graffenried (1914–2007), Swiss motor racing driver
- Guillaume, Hereditary Grand Duke of Luxembourg (born 1981)
- Francesca von Habsburg (born 1958), art collector and the wife of Karl Habsburg-Lothringen
- Albert Hammond, Jr. (born 1980), singer, musician, band member of The Strokes
- Juliet Hartford (born 1968), daughter of A&P Heir Huntington Hartford
- H. John Heinz III (1938–1991), United States Senator
- Richard Helms (1913–2002), Director of Central Intelligence and United States Ambassador to Iran
- Hermon Hermon-Hodge, 3rd Baron Wyfold (1915–1999), member of the British House of Lords
- Hohenzollern family members, of the Prussian royal House of Hohenzollern
- John Caldwell Holt (1923–1985), American author and educator, pioneer in youth rights theory
- Sir Alistair Horne (1925–2017), British historian, biographer
- J.B. Jackson (1909–1996), French-born American writer, landscape designer
- King Juan Carlos I of Spain (born 1938)
- Khaled Juffali, Saudi businessman
- Sir Michael Kadoorie (born 1941), Hong Kong business magnate
- Justine Kasa-Vubu, politician, daughter of former President of the DRC, Joseph Kasa-Vubu
- Rhonda Ross Kendrick (born 1971), actress, daughter of Diana Ross
- Adnan Khashoggi family, the children of Saudi arms dealer Adnan Khashoggi
- Michael Korda (born 1933), writer, former Editor-in-Chief of Simon & Schuster
- James Laughlin (1914–1997), American poet and book publisher
- Sean Taro Ono Lennon (born 1975), musician, son of John Lennon and Yoko Ono
- Warner LeRoy (1935–2001), owner of Tavern on the Green and the Russian Tea Room
- Marie-Chantal, Crown Princess of Greece (born 1968), member of the Greek Royal Family and one of the Miller Sisters
- Molson family members, of the Molson Breweries Canada family
- Leona Naess (born 1974), British singer-songwriter
- Nicholas Negroponte (born 1943), founder and Chairman Emeritus of the MIT Media Lab
- Stavros Niarchos family, the children of Greek shipping magnate Stavros Niarchos
- Álvaro Noboa (born 1950), Ecuadorian businessman, candidate for the Ecuadorian Presidency
- Paul Noritaka Tange (born 1958), Japanese architect, son of Kenzō Tange
- King Ntare V of Burundi (1947–1972), the last King of Burundi
- Ali Reza Pahlavi I (1922–1954), brother of Shah Mohammad Reza Pahlavī
- Gholam Reza Pahlavi (1923–2017), son of Reza Shah
- Shah Mohammad Reza Pahlavī (1919–1980), the last Shah of Iran
- Pahlavī family members, of the Pahlavī dynasty of the Persian Empire
- Prince Rainier III of Monaco (1923–2005)
- Andrea di Robilant, Italian fiction writer
- Winthrop Paul Rockefeller (1948–2006), Lieutenant Governor of Arkansas, member of the Rockefeller Family
- Alexis von Rosenberg, Baron de Rédé (1922–2004), art collector, socialite
- Tracee Ellis Ross (born 1972), actress, daughter of Diana Ross
- Rothschild family members, of the banking and finance dynasty
- Robin Russell, 14th Duke of Bedford (1940–2003)
- Tatiana Santo Domingo (born 1983), Brazilian and Colombian socialite and heiress
- Richard René Silvin, author and historian
- Tad Szulc (1926–2001), non-fiction writer, New York Times correspondent
- Taittinger family members, French champagne producers
- Mayuko Takata (born 1971), Japanese actress, Iron Chef judge
- Elizabeth Taylor family, the children of Elizabeth Taylor and Michael Wilding
- Irving Thalberg Jr. (1930–1987), American philosopher, son of Irving Thalberg and Norma Shearer
- David Verney, 21st Baron Willoughby de Broke (born 1938), member of the British House of Lords
- Prince Dasho Ugyen Jigme Wangchuck of Bhutan
- Princess Ashi Euphelma Choden Wangchuck of Bhutan
- Thady Wyndham-Quin, 7th Earl of Dunraven and Mount-Earl, Irish peer
- Adam Zamoyski, member of the Zamoyski family

== anciens Roséens ==
In English, the French terms are also sometimes used: anciens Roséens (f. anciennes Roséennes), Roséens (Roséennes) or simply anciens (f. anciennes). When referring to both genders together, the masculine form is used.
