= Nazlı Çelik =

Turkish TV presenter

- Born: Ayşe Nazlı Çelik; 1977 (age 48–49); Istanbul, Turkey
- Occupation: TV presenter
- Years active: 1999–present
- Spouses: Burak Öztarhan (m. 1999; div. 2012) Serdar Bilgili (m. 2015; div. 2015)

Ayşe Nazlı Çelik (born 1977) is a Turkish TV presenter. She is the daughter of Yücel and Semra Çelik, one of the managers of Doğuş Holding.

== Career ==
On 16 March 2016, she went to Nusaybin, Mardin, and reported on the incidents. Later in April, she went to Yüksekova, Hakkâri, and prepared an onsite field report about the events that were happening in the area. Following the release of Nazlı Çelik's reports from Yüksekova, Hakkâri, People's Democratic Party's (HDP) representative from Hakkari, Abdullah Zeydan, criticized Çelik and accused her of "acquiring rating through blood". Çelik responded to the accusations by saying, "[What is shown] is the actual place itself, not a movie set in Hollywood. Soldiers and cops are not figurants. The holes in the surrounding buildings are not drill holes. It's Yüksekova itself, where dozens of martyrs lost their lives and many terrorists were killed."

== Personal life ==
She married Burak Öztarhan in 1999 and divorced in 2012. She then married Serdar Bilgili on 14 February 2015 in Madrid and divorced 6 months later.

== Television ==
TV channels

- 1999–2005: NTV
- 2005–: Star TV

Programs

- 1999: Seçim 1999 (NTV) (with Erdoğan Aktaş)
- 1999–2005: NTV Haber (NTV)
- 2002: Seçim 2002 (NTV) (with Erdoğan Aktaş)
- 2004: Seçim 2004 (NTV) (with Erdoğan Aktaş and Bahar Feyzan)
- 2005–2006: Nazlı Öztarhan ile Gece Haberleri (Star TV)
- 2006: Kırmızı Koltuk (Star TV) (with Erdoğan Aktaş)
- 2006–2008: Star TV Ana Haber Bülteni (Star TV)
- 2007: Türkiye'nin Seçimi 2007 (Star TV) (with Erdoğan Aktaş)
- 2008–2011: Haftasonu Haberleri (Star TV)
- 2011–present: Star TV Ana Haber Bülteni (Star TV)
- 2014: Nazlı Çelik ile Star'da Seçim 2014 (Star TV)

== Awards ==
- Golden Butterfly Awards, Best TV Presenter award, 2014
- Haliç University, Best News Program of the Year, 2015
- Marmara University, Best Anchorwoman of the Year award, 2015
- Golden Butterfly Awards, Best Female News Presenter award, 2016
