= Fikret Orman =

Turkish businessman and sports executive (born 1967)

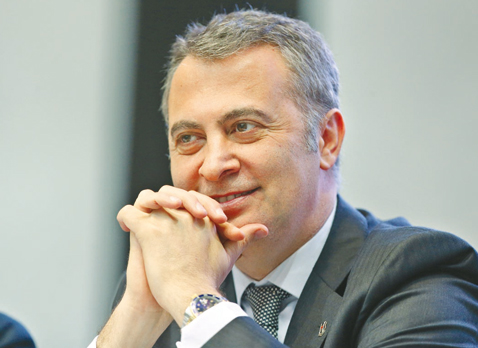
- Orman at the press conference in 2017

33rd President of Beşiktaş JK
- In office 25 March 2012 – 24 October 2019
- Preceded by: Yıldırım Demirören

Personal details
- Born: 4 November 1967 (age 58) Istanbul, Turkey
- Spouse: Sedef Orman (1992–2012)
- Children: 2
- Education: Yıldız Technical University; University of Florida
- Profession: Civil engineer, businessperson

Fikret Orman (born 4 November 1967) is a Turkish businessman and sports executive.

== Career ==
Orman graduated from Işık Lisesi, before going on to study at Yıldız Technical University, and later at the University of Florida in the United States. He has a degree in civil engineering. Orman has been involved in the construction and tourism sectors.

On March 25, 2012, Orman became the 33rd president of Beşiktaş J.K., receiving 4,025 of the 4,545 votes cast in the extraordinary congress held after previous president Yıldırım Demirören resigned to be appointed to the Turkish Football Federation. He was re-elected at the next ordinary congress in 2013, and once again in May 2016. His latest term ended in May 2019.

On 24 September 2019, Orman announced his resignation from Beşiktaş J.K. During his 7.5 years of tenure, commercial debts of club raised from TRY580 million up to TRY2.6 billion. During same period, there were total of 77 transfers made in and out, including Pepe, Mario Gómez, Demba Ba, Anderson Talisca, Jose Sosa, Gary Medel, Alvaro Negredo and Domagoj Vida.

Honorary titles
Preceded by Yıldırım Demirören	President of Beşiktaş JK; 2012–2019	Succeeded by Ahmet Nur Çebi
