= Serdar Bilgili =

Turkish businessman

- Born: 21 July 1963 (age 62); Istanbul, Turkey
- Education: Robert College / University of Redlands
- Occupation: Businessperson
- Spouses: Ebru İpekçi (m. 1997; div. 2002) Nazlı Çelik (m. 2015; div. 2015)
- Children: 2

Serdar Bilgili (born 21 July 1963) is a businessman who served as the president of the Istanbul-based football club Beşiktaş J.K.

== Early life and education ==
Born in Istanbul, after graduating from Robert College, he completed his earned a degree in business at Redlands University, California Business and Photography. He is the Chairman of the Board of Directors of Bilgili Holding, which conducts investment and development activities in real estate and tourism. Serdar Bilgili is also the founder of the BLG Capital, which is focused on investing in real estate in Turkey and America. The priority of BLG in its investments is tourism, housing and mixed-use projects in Istanbul. Between 1992-1998, he was the Secretary General of Beşiktaş Sports Club and a Member of the Board of Directors. Between 2000–2004, he was the president of Beşiktaş Sports Club. During this period, BJK was offered to the public and became the first football club to be traded in the ISE. He opened two photography exhibitions in the USA. His works, which took place in the photo exhibition "Despite the Barriers ...", which he opened in Istanbul in 2007, were collected in the book published with the same title in January 2008. The "Nişantaşı Portraits" open-air photography exhibition, consisting of black and white portraits of Nişantaşı's landmarks, took place on the exterior of the VK108 residence project developed by Bilgili on Valikonağı Street in August and September 2018.

== Beşiktaş period ==
Serdar Bilgili's management career in Beşiktaş started in 1992 with his election to the Beşiktaş Board of Directors. Serdar Bilgili, who served on the Beşiktaş Board of Directors under the direction of Süleyman Seba, between 1992 and 1998, worked as the Secretary General and Press Spokesperson during this time. In the elections held on March 26, 2000, Beşiktaş President was elected and he appointed Nevio Scala. On 31 March 2002, a record number of members voted for, and was elected to the Beşiktaş Gymnastics Club Presidency, taking 7,383 of the current games of 3,363.

In the second half of the 2003–04 season of the Super League, Beşiktaş's heavy points losses caused reactions and resigned in 2004.

== Awards ==
In 2008, he received the Istanbul Tourism Award with the Akaretler Project.

In 2009, he received the award of the Urban Land Institute (ULI) in London with Akaretler Row Houses, the second largest restoration project of Europe.

Sporting positions
Preceded by Süleyman Seba	President of Beşiktaş JK; 2000–2004	Succeeded by Yıldırım Demirören
