= Brillantmont International School =

- Ecole Internationale Brillantmont, internat et externat

Location
- Avenue Charles-Secrétan 16; 1005 Lausanne, Vaud; Switzerland

Information
- Other names: Brillantmont or BM
- Type: Private, international, day and boarding
- Established: 1882
- Authorizer: NEASC & CIS
- Director: Mrs. Anne Frei
- Gender: Co-educational
- Enrollment: 100 boarders, 50 day students
- Tuition: CHF 34,500 to CHF 103,500
- Website: www.brillantmont.ch

Brillantmont International School is a coeducational international school. It is one of the oldest boarding schools in Switzerland, having been established in 1882 and owned by the same family for five generations. It is located in the centre of Lausanne. The school grounds overlook Lac Léman and the Swiss Alps.

Currently, Brillantmont has around 150 students, boarding and day, aged between 13 and 18, representing over 35 different nationalities.

== Accreditation ==
=== Swiss authorities ===
BIS's (upper) secondary education (Middle and High School) is not approved as a Mittelschule/Collège/Liceo by the Swiss Federal State Secretariat for Education, Research and Innovation (SERI).

=== International ===
Brillantmont International School is a member of the Swiss Federation of Private Schools and is fully accredited by the New England Association of Schools and Colleges (NEASC) and the Council of International Schools (CIS). It is a member of Swiss Learning.

== Academics ==
Brillantmont's academic programmes are taught in English. Students study either in the British Programme, to prepare for the IGCSE and A Level examinations (Cambridge Assessment International Education), or in the American Programme, which prepares students for the American High School Graduation Diploma.

The 8th and 9th Grade programmes of studies are designed to meet the needs of international 13 to 15 year olds and cover a broad range of subjects. After 9th Grade personalised timetables enable students to develop their strengths and interests, keeping in view their future university choices/career plans. Students in the 10th Grade follow a selection of courses covering a solid range of subjects. In 11th and 12th Grade the courses extend and build on students’ subject knowledge. They can focus on subjects they are particularly interested in and which they may wish to pursue further at university.

Throughout high school, students have the opportunity to prepare for external, internationally recognized examinations: IGCSE/AS/A Level examinations (Cambridge Assessment International Education), PSAT, SAT, SAT Subject Tests, AP Examinations (US College Board), or European Language Examinations.

Upon completion of their studies students can enter universities all over the world, with many choosing to go to the UK or to the USA. Brillantmont boasts that 100% of its students continue their studies to higher education.

Brillantmont also offers a post high school 13th Grade programme for students who have already completed their high school studies.

Class sizes at Brillantmont are small, averaging 15 students. Although all teaching is in English, every student must learn French, the local language.

There is a strong emphasis on technology across campus and the interactive private area on the website allows parents to follow their child's progress. Artistic skills are also enhanced with singing and acting classes, as well as drawing, sculpture, photography, digital design, journalism and learning of various musical instruments.

== School life ==
Excursions are organized each weekend to enable students to discover Switzerland and its neighbouring countries. From January to April, skiing is a major fixture of the excursion calendar. After class, extra-curricular activities take place on campus. These include Model United Nations, Finance Society, Yoga, School Band, Vocal Group, Cooking Club, and Photography.

Throughout the year, students have the opportunity to travel to other countries in Europe and other continents to take part in charity work. This social labor mostly consists of students fundraising for Globalharmony or participating in a building project run by Habitat for Humanity.

Boarders live on campus, in houses according to their age and gender. Resident teachers look after the students. The school has a house system, which facilitates contact and friendship within the school community. The heads of the school also live on campus. An on-campus health service is available 24 hours a day.

College and career guidance is offered to all students and counseling is available to assist students with academic and personal problems.

== Faculty ==
The school faculty has 30 professional staff representing 10 nationalities. The faculty/student ratio is 1 to 4.

== Summer course ==
A summer course takes place in July and August to welcome boys and girls aged between 10 and 16 to study French or English with sports and activities. The minimum stay is two weeks.

== Notable alumni ==
- Gene Tierney - American actress
- Princess Elisabeth of Denmark (1952-1953)
- Princess Benedikte of Denmark (1960-61)
