= Lyceum Alpinum Zuoz =

Coordinates: 46°36′18″N 9°57′37″E

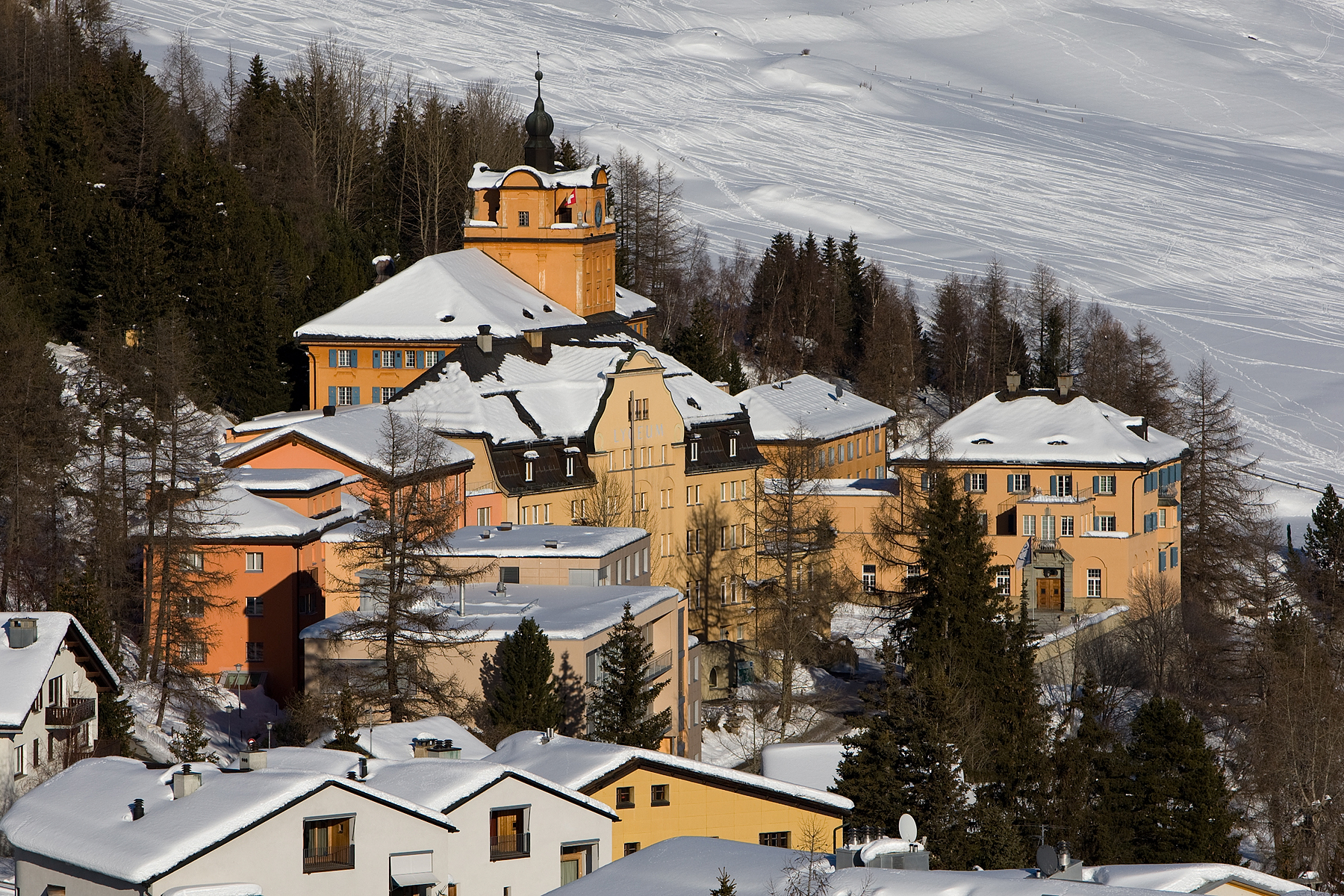
- Lyceum Alpinum in Zuoz, Roland Zumbuehl
- Zuoz, Canton of Graubünden; Switzerland

Information
- Type: Private, International boarding school
- Motto: Mens sana in corpore sano, A healthy mind in a healthy body
- Established: 1904
- Headmaster: Oliver Hartwright
- Enrollment: ~300
- Student to teacher ratio: 4:1
- Nickname: Lyceum Alpinum
- Website: www.lyceum-alpinum.ch

Lyceum Alpinum Zuoz is an international boarding school in Zuoz, near St. Moritz in Switzerland. Founded in 1904, it is located in the upper part of the alpine village in the area of Surmulins. There are around 300 pupils, including 220 in the boarding houses. The boarders originate from over 30 countries, such as Italy, Russia, Germany and the United States.

== History ==
Founded in 1904, Lyceum Alpinum is one of the oldest private boarding schools in Switzerland. It is located 1,750 m (5,740 ft) above sea level on the Swiss Alps of Zuoz, near the alpine village of St. Moritz.

The school was founded by a group of locals from the Engadine as an institution for ailing boys, whose parents were spending their vacation in St.Moritz, so that they could benefit from the mountain air and did not fall behind in any of their subjects. It was at the time called the "Institut Engiadina", and had 22 students in its first year and was run by a director and two teachers.

However, it very soon developed into a fully-fledged secondary school for boys - later on girls were also admitted. It is attended by around 200 boarders and 100 day pupils from the region. The pupils are between 11 and 21 years old.

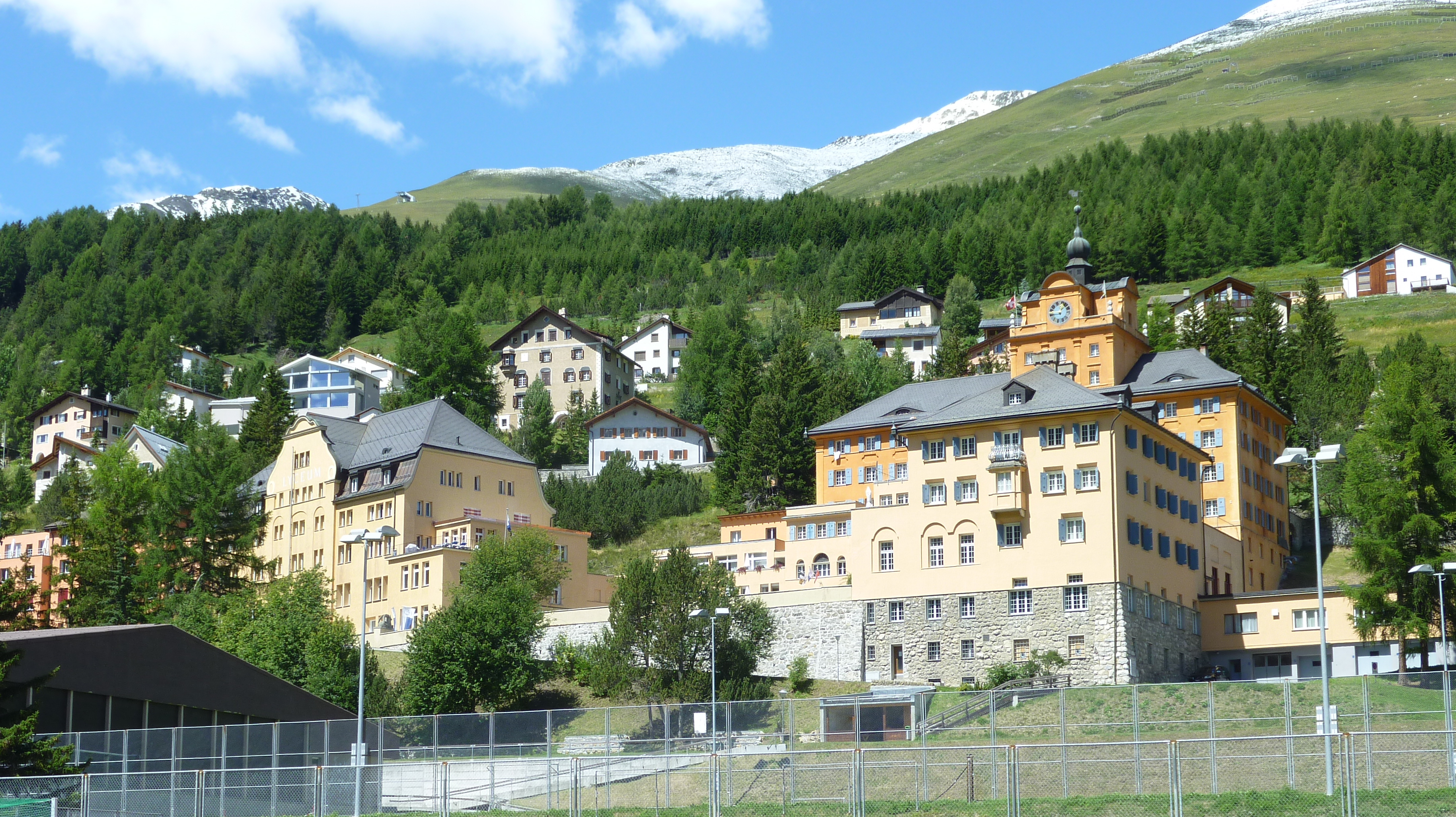
Lyceum Alpinum Zuoz

== Theatre ==
The school has had its own amateur theatre since 2006. The German-speaking Shakespeare Company performs, amongst other things, plays written by this British dramatist. The English Theatre Company develop their stage plays from scratch themselves and perform only in English. In December 2011 the Zuoz Globe was opened – the only permanent theatre in the Engadine.

== The Zuoz Club ==
The Zuoz Club is the alumni organisation related to the Lyceum Alpinum Zuoz. It was founded in 1923. The Zuoz Club consists of former students of the Lyceum Alpinum Zuoz. Presently, the alumni organisation has 2,200 members in 42 countries and is divided in 18 regional groups worldwide.

== Notable former pupils ==
- Ernie Blake (1913–1989), founder of Taos Ski Valley, New Mexico
- Bram van der Stok (1915–1993), Decorated Dutch flying ace, successful Stalag Luft III escapee, medical doctor and NASA researcher
- Karlheinz Böhm (1928–2014), German-born Austrian actor and philanthropist
- Douglas Busk (1906–1990), British diplomat, mountaineer and geographer
- Chris von Rohr (born 1951), Swiss rock musician, record producer, author, columnist, radio and television presenter
- Götz George (1938–2016), German actor
- Thomas Gold (1920–2004), Austrian astrophysicist
- André Gorz (1923–2007), Austrian philosopher
- Wilfrid Israel (1899–1943), Anglo-German businessman and philanthropist
- Ulrich Körner (born 1962), German-Swiss businessman
- Mustafa Vehbi Koç (1960–2016), Turkish businessman and former Chairman of Koç Holding
- Hans-Adam II, Prince of Liechtenstein (born 1945)
- Anton Piëch (1894–1952), Austrian-German lawyer and the son-in-law of Ferdinand Porsche
- Ferdinand Piëch (1937–2019), Austrian industrialist (1937–2019), head of Volkswagen
- Gunter Sachs (1932–2011), German-born Swiss industrial heir, socialite, art collector, photographer and author
- Michael White (1936–2016), British theatrical impresario and film producer
- Anton-Wolfgang Graf von Faber-Castell (1941–2016), former CEO of Faber-Castell

== See also ==
- Institut Le Rosey
- Collège Alpin International Beau Soleil
- Aiglon College
- Institut Auf Dem Rosenberg
