= Surval Montreux =

Coordinates: 46.4248°N 6.9295°E

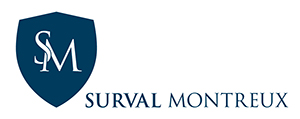
- Montreux, Switzerland

Information
- Type: International, boarding, all girls school
- Motto: Imagination. Initiative. Independence.
- Established: 1961
- Headmistress: Ms Nicola Dudley
- Gender: Girls
- Age range: 12–19
- Enrollment: 60–80
- Average class size: 6–8
- Education system: IGCSE, A-Levels, American High School Program
- School fees: CHF 96,075
- Website: www.surval.ch

Surval Montreux is an international all girls boarding school in Montreux, Switzerland.

The school was renamed to Surval Montreux in 2012 after it was bought by Bellevue Education. The parent company is Bellevue Education International Limited. In 2019, CVC acquired a 30% stake in GEMS Education, which also includes its stake in Bellevue Education.

== Academics ==
SM begins with Foundation Year. The majority of Foundation students start at age 13, but English language learners may start at age 12 and spend a year working on their English before joining the rest of the school. After Foundation Year, there are two academic tracks, students either earn an American high school diploma or take the IGCSE and A-Levels.

SM offers a pre-university program for students aged 17 to 19, the Surval Swiss Gap Experience.

== Accreditation ==
SM's (upper) secondary education (Middle and High School) is not approved as a Mittelschule/Collège/Liceo by the Swiss Federal State Secretariat for Education, Research and Innovation (SERI).
