= Yıldırım Demirören =

Turkish businessman

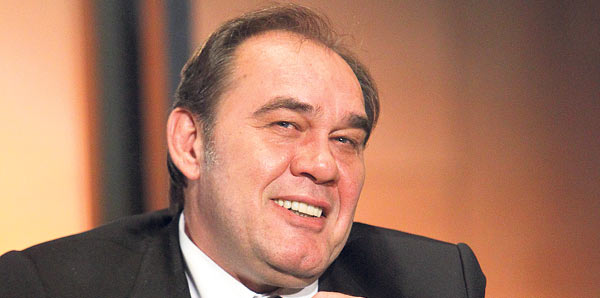

President of the Turkish Football Federation
- In office 27 February 2012 – 28 February 2019
- Preceded by: Hüsnü Güreli (interim)
- Succeeded by: Hüsnü Güreli (interim)

President of Beşiktaş JK
- In office 26 April 2004 – 27 February 2012
- Preceded by: Serdar Bilgili
- Succeeded by: Fikret Orman

Personal details
- Born: 6 October 1964 (age 61) Bursa,Turkey
- Spouse: Revna Demirören (m. 1991)
- Children: 3
- Education: Leysin American School
- Occupation: Industrialist, businessman, sports manager

Yıldırım Demirören (born 6 October 1964) is a Turkish businessman, former chair of the Istanbul-based Turkish multisports club Beşiktaş, and former president of the Turkish Football Federation.

He owns part of Demirören Şirketler Grubu (Demirören Group), which was founded in 1964 and are focused on liquid gas distribution.

Yıldırım Demirören resigned from his post as the president of Beşiktaş J.K. to be a candidate for the presidency of the Turkish Football Federation (TFF). He was elected president of the TFF on 27 February 2012 succeeding Mehmet Ali Aydınlar, who resigned on 31 January 2012.

== Personal life ==
Demirören is an alumnus of Leysin American School. He is married and has three children. He is also member of Turkish business associations TÜSİAD and TUGİAD. His hobbies are golf and traveling.

Honorary titles
Preceded by Serdar Bilgili	President of Beşiktaş JK; 2004–2012	Succeeded by Fikret Orman
Preceded by Mehmet Ali Aydınlar	President of the Turkish Football Federation; 2012–2019	Succeeded by Nihat Özdemir
