= Institut auf dem Rosenberg =

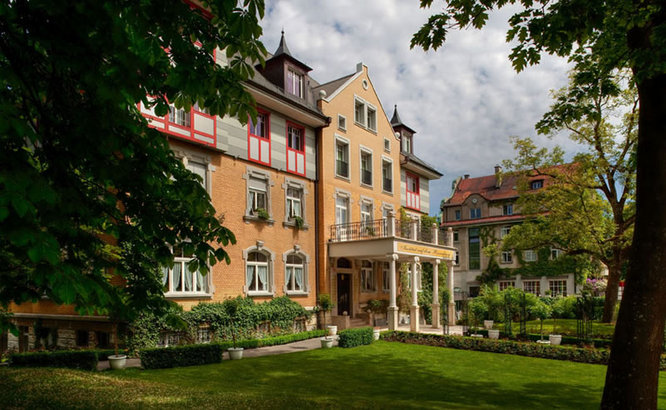

Location
- Höhenweg 60; 9000 St. Gallen; Switzerland; 47.4254°N 9.3647°E

Information
- Other names: Rosenberg; The Artisans of Education
- Former names: Institut Dr. Schmidt (1889–1924)
- Type: Private, International Boarding school
- Motto: To learn to live is the goal of all education
- Established: 1889; 137 years ago
- President: Bernhard Gademann
- Gender: Co-educational
- Age range: 4–18
- Enrollment: 300
- Average class size: 6–12
- Campus type: Suburban
- Tuition: $175,000
- Website: www.instrosenberg.ch

Institut auf dem Rosenberg is a private international boarding school located near Lake Constance in St. Gallen, Switzerland. Founded in 1889, it is one of the oldest boarding schools in Switzerland and reportedly the most expensive school in the world. As of 2025, it has a student body of around 280 students drawn from 60 nationalities. It has educated diplomats, oligarchs, world leaders, Nobel laureates, and generations of global aristocracy and industrial dynasties, and has been referred to as the "Davos for children".

The school has 28 co-curricular facilities attached to its 13 art nouveau residences. The student-built SAGA Habitat and ETH Zurich greenhouse allows for the study of various engineering and agricultural cybernetic disciplines. The main campus, 25-hectares on the edge of Lake Constance, with adjoining school villas immediately across, feature "wind-trees" co-designed by Rosenberg students to generate renewable energy. The HumaniX Pavilion offers computer science and mechatronics capacity-buildings programs for students as young as 6, and the private parklands nearby include ten sports pitches, two shooting and hunting ranges, and five in-house theatres. Rosenberg also owns a private alpine club offering 12 local sports, a polo school, and a riding arena.

The Swiss educational reformer Johann Heinrich Pestalozzi inspired the philosophy of the school and one of his quotes, "to learn, to live is the goal of all education," is Rosenberg's official motto.

== History ==
The Institut auf dem Rosenberg was founded in 1889 by Ulrich Schmidt and originally carried the name of the founder, Institut Dr. Schmidt. After the passing of Dr. Schmidt in 1924, the Gademann Family has owned and managed the school for four consecutive generations since 1944. Bernhard Gademann, a former pupil in the 1980s, is the fourth generation of the family to head the school.

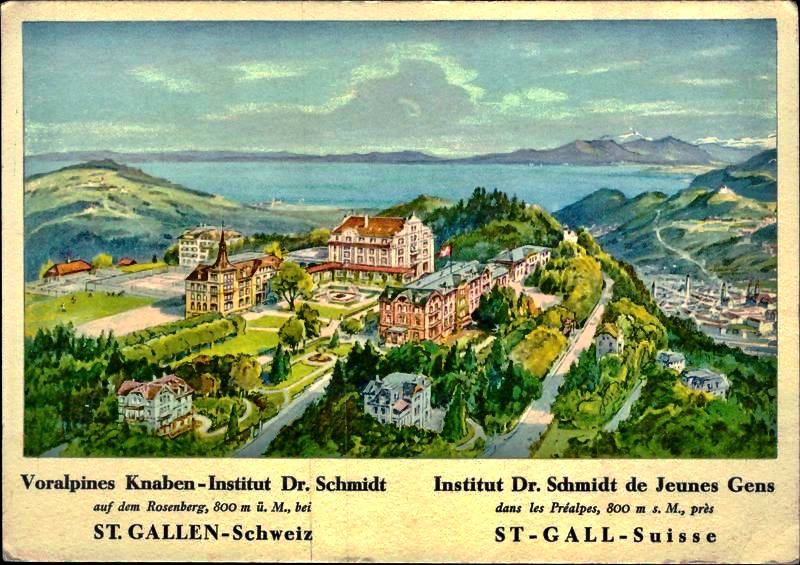
A 1910s postcard of Rosenberg

Even initially, the school was built with the intention of housing all French, German, Italian, Swiss, and Anglo-American faculties from different regions of the world to prepare students to sit different national qualifications in Switzerland.

By the 1960s, the Anglo-American section of the school typically maintained around 60 international pupils aged between eleven and eighteen who, irrespective of their nationality, would also sit for the American SAT. During this period, the staff turnover was apparently high. Milton Toubkin, an educationist who founded Southbank International School, argued the school at this time was more concerned with money than academic standards.

== Admissions ==
Rosenberg has a limited student capacity and has been described as one of the more 'exclusive' Swiss boarding schools. Spaces are allocated on merit, and it is rare for a student to join after the academic year begins. In general, an applicant may be registered up until December with an application fee of CHF1,000 to join a waiting list. Selected candidates are then called to sit through an intensive admissions test.

Various figures have been suggested for the total enrolment. A 2019 article in the magazine Air Mail claimed 300 students from 48 different nationalities, while the South China Morning Post reported in the same year that "no more than 260" are enrolled. Other sources have repeated a lower figure of 230.

=== Fees ===
As of 2023, Rosenberg is the most expensive school in the world when both tuition and boarding costs are taken into account.

The base fee covering academic tuition, school meals and similar is CHF93,000. Additional fees for housing, extracurriculars and personal expenses amount to CHF57,000 on average. This makes for a combined cost in dollars of around $175,000 per year.

== Academic curriculum ==
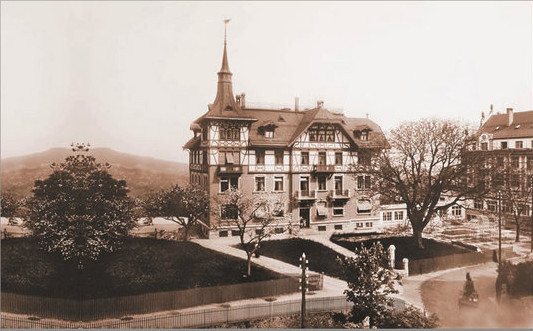
Institut auf dem Rosenberg Main Building in 1902

Rosenberg is a highly residential school offering eight different national qualifications, 100+ academic courses, and 32 different languages taught by native faculty. Rosenberg students undertake a broad range of external exams including the IGCSEs, A-Levels, Advanced Placement (AP's), the International Baccalaureate (IB) as well as the GIB DP Programme (German International Baccalaureate). In a 2019 interview, Headmaster Gademann boasted that "we teach pretty much anything from international law to product design and entrepreneurship".

Alongside formal qualifications, students jointly pursue the school's own independent Rosenberg International Curriculum (RIC) that supplements core classes with a variety of personalized learning opportunities with external program partners like MIT. There is a focus on creativity and interpersonal skills alongside academic elements in general. Individual Development Plan (IDP) specialists design individualized course plans for each student, with more than a 100 external course programs available, including specializations in Politics, Diplomacy, Investment Strategy, Biotechnology, and Applied Robotics.

For 2024, Rosenberg students scored A*-- A grade on average in both IGCSEs, GCSEs, and A levels, with a 38 on the International Baccalaureate. It is not uncommon for students to take qualifications and courses ahead of their age group.

Additionally, Rosenberg is also an official testing centre for CEFR A1-C2 (including Cambridge, Goethe, DELF, DALF and DELE), SAT and the IELTS. Some of the teaching staff were trained in the British state school sector.

== Accreditation ==
The school is a member of the Swiss Federation of Private Schools (SFPS) as well as the Swiss Group of International Schools (SGIS). Institut auf dem Rosenberg is accredited by COGNIA, the International Boarding Schools Organization, and the Educational Collaborative for International Schools.

=== By Swiss authorities ===
Rosenberg's Kindergarten, primary education programs (Pre-School and Primary School, grades 1–5) and lower secondary education program (Middle School, grades 6–8) are accredited by the bureau for elementary school (Amt für Volksschule), department for education (Bildungsdepartement), canton of St. Gallen.

Rosenberg's upper secondary education programs (High School, grades 9–12) is not accredited by the department of education (Bildungsdepartement), canton of St. Gallen, nor by the Swiss Federal State Secretariat for Education, Research and Innovation (SERI).

=== By international authorities ===
Institut auf dem Rosenberg is internationally accredited by Cognia (formerly AdvancED). The school is a member of the European Council of International Schools and accredited for the International Baccalaureate (IB) - Diploma Programme.

== Campus life ==
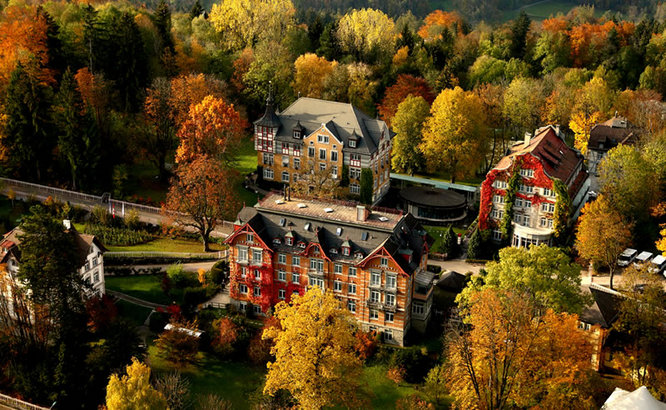
Aerial view of the campus

The Rosenberg campus is 100,000m² of private parkland. Students are housed in restored art-nouveau villas according to gender and age. In 2024, Architectural Digest named the school one of the "World's 9 Most Beautiful Boarding Schools."

One of the social highlights of the year is the Rosenberg Ball, for which pupils are coached by professionals for two months in preparation.

=== Sport ===
Owing to its location between Lake Constance and the Alpstein mountain range, Rosenberg provides daily opportunities to privately train in snow sports during winter with local resorts. Ice skating, mountain biking, football, golf, swimming, volleyball and basketball are examples of the numerous sports the school offers.

=== Uniform ===
There is no official school uniform. Students are instead required to dress formally during school hours. This applies from Monday to Friday during breakfast, lunch, and academic lessons. Smart casual is acceptable at dinner and on the weekend.

== Awards and recognition ==
The school was recognised as the "Most Prestigious International Boarding School" in 2019 by Corporate Vision magazine.

== Notable alumni ==
The school operates a strict privacy policy, and does not confirm or deny any names of current or former students. An exception was made in the case of Mario J. Molina, winner of the 1995 Nobel Prize in Chemistry.

Other known alumni include Karl Friedrich, Prince of Hohenzollern, photographer and playboy Gunter Sachs, and the mathematician Walter Rudin. The exiled Russian businessman Mikhail Khodorkovsky is said to have educated his children at Rosenberg.

Gademann has claimed that both "Silicon Valley figures" and members of "industrial dynasties" have attended.

== Notable staff ==
Holger Czukay, the German musician, lectured at the school from 1966 to 1967. The German writer W. G. Sebald taught for a year at the school from 1969 to 1970.

== See also ==
- Institut Le Rosey
