= Leysin American School =

Private boarding school in Leysin, VD, Switzerland

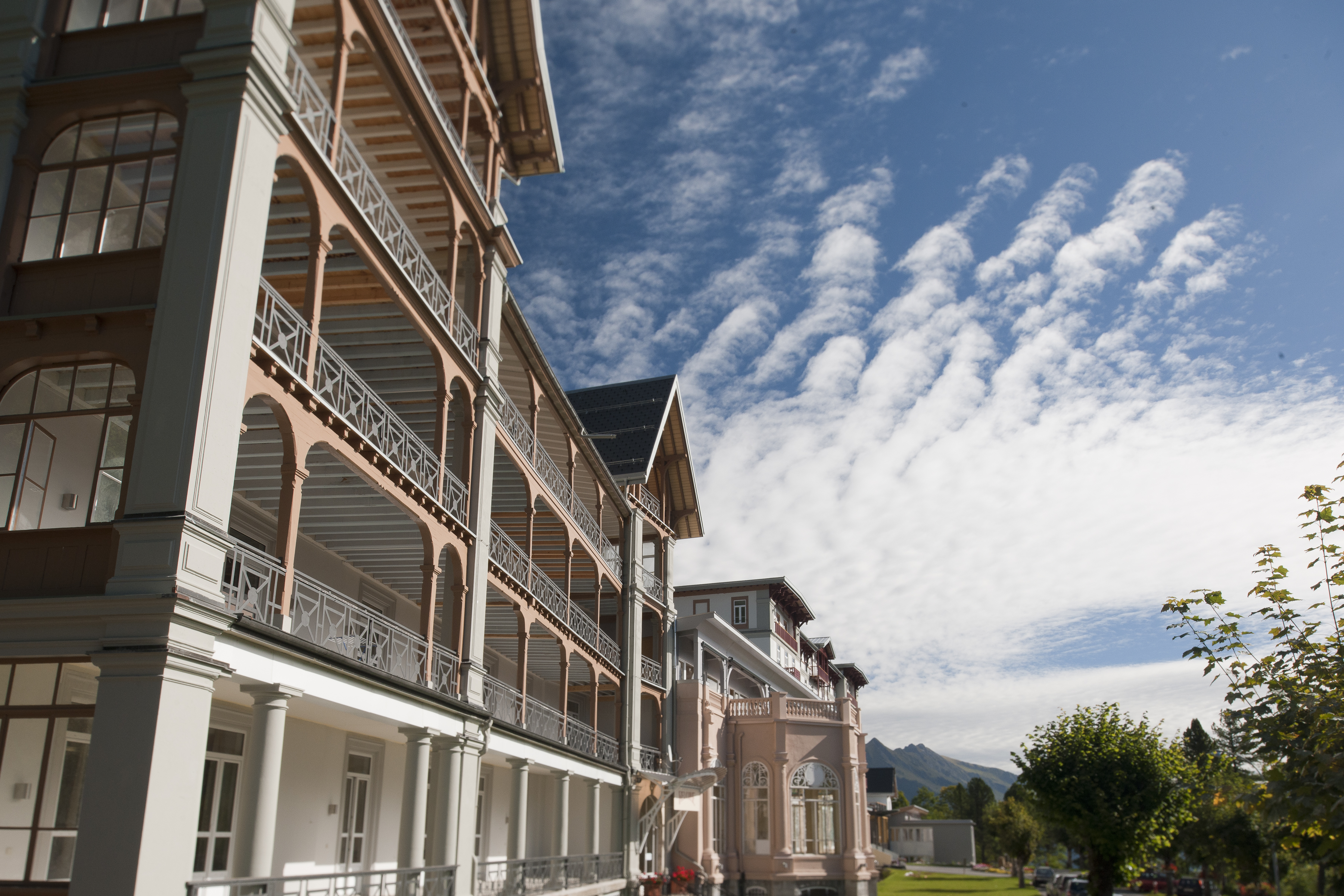

Location
- Leysin, VD; Switzerland; 46.34518°N 7.00768°E

Information
- Type: Private, boarding
- Established: 1960
- Faculty: 72
- Enrollment: 340
- Average class size: 12 students
- Student to teacher ratio: 8:1
- Colors: Red, black and white
- Athletics: 11 Interscholastic Sports; 11 Interscholastic Teams
- Mascot: Ibex
- Tuition: CHF 128,000 (USD 165,000) and does not include bonus going up to another CHF 25,000 to a total of CHF 153,000 (USD 200,000)
- Website: las.ch

Leysin American School (also referred to as LAS), founded in 1960 by Fred and Sigrid Ott, is a co-educational private family-owned boarding school located in the alpine village of Leysin, Vaud, Switzerland. As of 2024, it is home to 300 students from over 60 nationalities.

Students pursue either the American high school diploma or the International Baccalaureate, with additional options of individual IB and AP classes to suit particular interests. LAS also offers an extensive summer school, a pre-high school program for grade 7, and an ESL program. In October 2010, the school celebrated its 50th anniversary and officially inaugurated the opening of the newly renovated Grand Hotel, which was originally built in 1892 and houses IB students. LAS facilities include various classroom layouts (including open-plan classrooms in the IB facility), a media center, libraries, blackbox theater, performance hall, an art center, and access to horseback riding, ice skating, tennis, hockey, and swimming. The faculty to student ratio at LAS is 1:8 and the average class size is 12. LAS employs 72 full-time faculty, of which almost all live on campus; 95% are native English speakers, and 70% hold advanced degrees.

== Dormitories ==
There are eight dormitories for the students, divided by class and by gender. Savoy is the 10th and 11th grade boys' dorm. It is home to one of the school's dining halls, classrooms for grades 9–10, administration offices, and one of the school's libraries. Beau Reveil is the 7th, 8th and 9th grade girls' dorm. Vermont houses the IT department. Esplanade is the 7th, 8th, and 9th grade boys’ dorm. Beau Site is home to the 10th and 11th grade girls. The Belle Époque campus is home to 12th grade boys and girls, (with the students living in separate wings), classrooms for grades 11–12, one of the school's library, and administration offices.

== Purchase of Grand Hotel ==
On June 13, 2008, the Leysin American School purchased the Grand Hôtel at the upper edge of the Leysin village. The 10,000 square meter building and 4.3 hectare grounds were developed in 1890, during the Belle Époque period as a hotel and sanatorium clinic for the world's elite families. In the early 1980s, after decades of transition in Leysin from health clinics to education centers, the complex became the home of the American College of Switzerland. Major renovations to the building have been completed and it is now the location of the LAS IB campus. This has a dining hall, the Grand Salle ballroom, Art Center, The Cave lounge for students, a library, computer lab, and the boys’ and girls’ dormitories.

== Notable alumni ==
Children from several prominent families have attended Leysin American School. Among its notable alumni are members of the Saudi royal family, Ethiopian imperial family, the Rockefeller family, and the Vanderbilt family.

Notable students include:

- Yıldırım Demirören, Turkish businessman
- John Gidding, Turkish-American designer, model, and television personality
- Prince Paul Wossen-Seged Makonnen, Duke of Harar, Ethiopian royal
- Peter Wallenberg Jr., Swedish businessman

== Notable former staff ==
- John Harlin, mountaineer
- Royal Robbins, climber
