= Reddam House North Shore =

School in North Sydney, New South Wales, Australia

Location
- North Sydney, New South Wales; Australia; 33°50′5″S 151°12′32″E

Information
- Type: Independent, co-educational, day school
- Motto: We shall give back
- Denomination: Non-denominational
- Established: February 2025
- Principal: Mike Lu
- Enrolment: ~500 (K–10)
- Colours: Navy blue, khaki & white
- Slogan: We shall give back
- Website: northshore.reddamhouse.com.au

Reddam House North Shore is an independent, co-educational, non-denominational, day school located in North Sydney. It opened in February 2025 after extensive renovations to a Harry Seidler-designed office building, and is a member of Inspired Education Group, founded by businessman Nadim Nsouli.

== History ==
Reddam House's presence in Australia originally started as a Year 7 to 11 school in 2001 at the Bondi campus in Sydney's Eastern Suburbs. The school grew quickly, establishing a new campus at Woollahra, near Bondi Junction railway station, in 2003.

The school was purchased by Inspired Education Group in 2019, giving up $5 million AUD in government funding to gain for-profit status.

== Facilities ==
The $55 million campus is over 9,000m² and features science labs, multiple libraries, an auditorium, and fully-equipped arts, dance, drama, and music studios. The school also boasts a VR classroom in partnership with Meta.

== List of other Reddam House schools ==
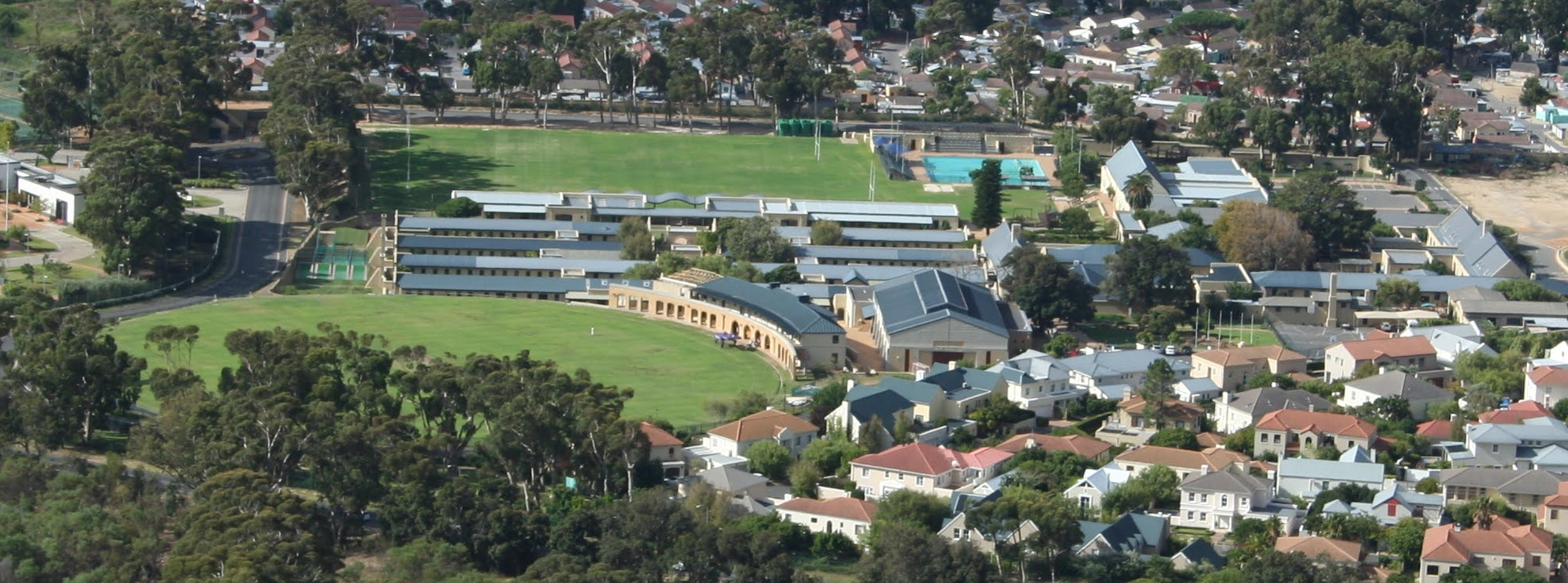
An aerial view of Reddam House's Constantia campus in Cape Town.

South Africa

- Reddam House Ballito, Ballito
- Reddam House Atlantic Seaboard, Cape Town
- Reddam House Constantia, Constantia, Cape Town
- Reddam House Durbanville, Durbanville
- Reddam House Umhlanga (previously known as 'Umhlanga College'), Umhlanga
- Reddam House Helderfontein, Fourways
- Reddam House Bedfordview, Bedfordview
- Reddam House Waterfall, Midrand

United Kingdom

- Reddam House Berkshire, Wokingham

Australia

- Reddam House Sydney, Woollahra & North Bondi

== See also ==
- List of non-government schools in New South Wales
