= Nadim Nsouli =

Lebanese businessperson

- Born: 1969 (age 56–57); Lebanon
- Education: Georgetown University (BA); New York University School of Law (JD); INSEAD (MBA)
- Occupations: Businessperson, investor
- Years active: 1990s–present
- Organization(s): Inspired Education Group, Educas, The Lyla Nsouli Foundation for Children's Brain Cancer Research
- Board member of: Inspired Education Group

Nadim Nsouli (born 1969) is a Lebanese businessperson. Currently the CEO and chairman of Inspired Education Group, he founded both Inspired Education and the investment company Educas in 2013. Earlier in his career, he held law, investment banking and private equity roles at Jones, Day, Reavis, and Pogue, JP Morgan, Morgan Stanley, The Gores Group, and Providence Equity Partners. He also founded and led the venture capital firm Lago Ventures and founded the Lyla Nsouli Foundation for Children's Brain Cancer Research.

== Early life and education ==
Born in 1969 in Lebanon, Nadim Nsouli spent his childhood in Beirut. His father, Dr. Marwan Nsouli, was a lawyer who had worked in the Washington, D.C. legal department of the World Bank, and later served as vice governor of Lebanon's Central Bank. While Nadim's brothers, Samer and Karim, went on to become hedge fund managers, at age 17, he left Lebanon for Washington, D.C. and began attending Georgetown University. In 1991 he earned an undergraduate degree from Georgetown, and in 1994 he earned a Juris Doctor degree from the New York University School of Law. He received an MBA from INSEAD in 1997.

== Career ==
=== 1990s-2013: Law and investment banking ===
Nsouli first worked in New York Jones, Day, Reavis, and Pogue as a corporate lawyer. Afterwards he worked for JP Morgan, and Morgan Stanley in London on their media and telecommunications investment banking teams. He subsequently founded and led Lago Ventures, a venture capital firm. The Gores Group, an investment firm based in Los Angeles specializing in distressed assets, then hired him to head their operations in Europe.

In 2006 he became a managing director and partner at Providence Equity Partners, a private equity firm with headquarters in Providence, Rhode Island. Working as a private equity partner for Providence, he was also a member of Providence's Global Investment Committee, leading the company's educational investment initiatives in the Middle East and Europe. He quit Providence Equity Partners in 2013 and began setting up his own company in London.

=== 2013-2020: Founding Inspired Education ===
Nsouli founded Educas, an investment company, and Inspired Education Group in 2013, becoming Inspired Education's chairman and CEO. The group's first acquisition was Reddam House, which owned four schools in South Africa. Nsouli subsequently acquired and built nine more schools in South Africa, as well as the Reddam House, Berkshire in the United Kingdom. Educas purchased the Brookhouse School in Nairobi, Kenya in 2015, and Nsouli became an owner of the British School of Bahrain in 2017. Nsouli was involved in a fee dispute with the Brookhouse Parents Association in 2020. When the Brookhouse School in Nairobi, which he owned through Inspired Education, went online only during the COVID pandemic, parents sued to have fees cut by half. Nsouli and Brookhouse School won the case in September 2020. Also in September 2020, Nsouli launched Kings College Online, an online-only private school for 14 to 18-year-olds.

=== 2021-2025: Recent years ===
Expressing optimism at growth prospects in the online home schooling market, in 2021 he purchased the online education firm Wey Education for £70 million. Nsouli purchased the majority of the Wetherby School in the UK in 2023, and in November 2023, he oversaw the opening of King's College School in New Providence, the Bahamas. By late 2024, Inspired Education Group managed around 110 private schools in 24 different countries, with Nsouli remaining a shareholder. Nsouli remains CEO and chairman of Inspired Education Group. The scholarship program Nsouli Scholars, which pays full tuition for fifty Inspired Education students at any one time, was launched in 2024. Nsouli has been critical of the Labour government's VAT change in the UK, saying in an interview that it is an example of a "stupid government decision" that is the main risk to the growth of large international school groups.

== Personal life ==
Nsouli and his family currently live in the Bahamas. After the eldest of his four children died of a brain tumor in 2012, the Nsoulis established the Lyla Nsouli Foundation for Children's Brain Cancer Research. Princess Ghida Talal was among its board-members as of 2014.
