= King's College School, Soto de Viñuelas =

English curriculum school in Spain

Coordinates: 40.614°N 3.680°W

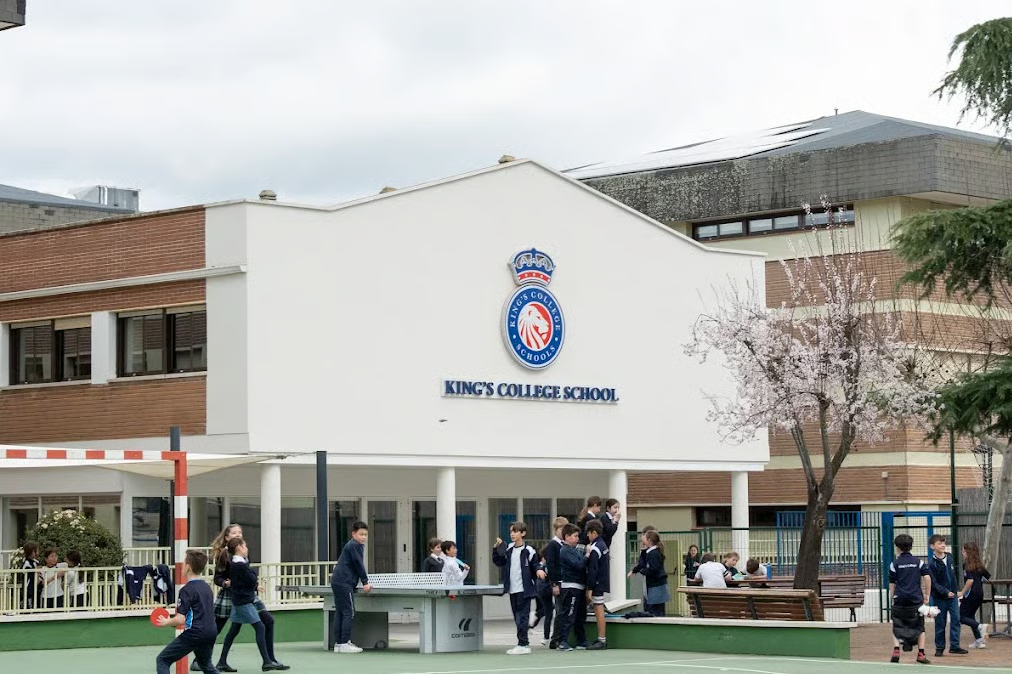
- Student Entrance of King's College Soto
- Soto de Viñuelas, Tres Cantos; Madrid, Spain

Information
- School type: International school
- Established: 1969; 57 years ago
- Founder: Roger Fry (educationist)
- Headmaster: Chris Ramsey
- Year Groups: Pre-Nursery – Year 13
- Enrollment: c.1250 (2026)
- Language: English
- Campus size: 12 acres
- Affiliation: King's Group; Inspired Education Group

King's College Soto De Viñuelas (commonly known as King's College Madrid or King's College Soto) is a co-educational day and boarding English curriculum school in Madrid, which provides English education for children from Pre-Nursery to Year 13. It was founded in 1969 and is part of King's Group; it moved to its current site in 1978.

== History ==
The main school moved in 1978 to its present, purpose-built premises in the residential area of Soto de Viñuelas to the north of Madrid.

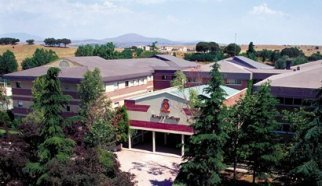
Aerial photo of King's College Soto entrance 2010

Pupils follow the English National Curriculum and are prepared for IGCSE and GCE "A" Levels or IB (International Baccalaureate), including a wide range of subjects.

=== Headmasters ===
Chris Ramsey 2024-
Mathew Taylor 2017-2024
Andrew Rattue 2014–2017
Elaine Blaus 2010–2014

Gerald Percy 1991–1996
Christopher Leech 1986–1991
Peter Stokes 1981–1986
Sir Roger Fry (educationist) 1969-1981 (Founder)

== About the curriculum ==
The school offers the English National Curriculum (IGCSE's and A Levels) taught in English by British trained teachers, along with local language lessons.

The schools' educational programme is based on the English National Curriculum and offers an English education from Pre-Nursery children to University Entrance.

The curriculum leads to the GCSE examinations at the end of Year 11 (age 16), principally using the IGCSE board (Pearson Edexcel and AQA). These studies are officially recognised by the Spanish Ministry of Education through the process of validation.

== University entrance ==
The school has a Careers and University entrance Advisory Department which offers pupils help and advice when applying for Higher Education, whether in the UK or in the rest of the world.

In 2013, Paul McNally, University Guidance Counsellor at King's College Madrid (1993-), received recognition from Stanford University for his work supporting students’ university applications and admissions outcomes, highlighting the school's university guidance programme.

== Other sister schools ==
Many sister schools have been closed in the past, these are visible under the King's Group wikipedia

=== King's College, Soto de Viñuelas, Madrid (main school) ===
The main school site (Since 1978) caters for more than 1200 pupils between the ages of 2 and 18 years (Pre-Nursery to Year 13). An additional 'baby unit' or 'pre-pre-nursery' was recently added, catering for students as young as 20 months old. It is located in a 12-acre site in the countryside between the city and the Guadarrama mountains.

The school is a member of HMC, COBIS,NABSS, BSA and CICAE.

As of 2026 King's College in Madrid altogether has about 1,250 students, with 70% of them being Spanish and the next-largest group of students being British. Source:

=== King's College School, La Moraleja, Madrid ===
King's College School is located in La Moraleja, one of the residential areas in Madrid and 15 kilometres away from the city centre. The school houses over 600 pupils from age 2 to 16 years (Pre-Nursery to Year 11). In Year 12, pupils are automatically offered a place to continue their studies at the Sixth Form in sister school King's College, Soto de Viñuelas.

=== King's Infant School, Chamartin, Madrid ===
Located in the Chamartín area of Madrid, close to where the original school was located before moving to Soto de Viñuelas, King's Infant School offers purpose-built facilities for boys and girls between the ages of 2 and 6 (Pre-Nursery to Year 2) and has a capacity of approximately 200 pupils.

From the age of seven (National Curriculum Year 3) onwards, pupils are educated at either the main site in King's College School, Soto de Viñuelas (2 to 18 years) or at King's College School, La Moraleja (3 to 16 years).

=== King's College, The British School of Alicante ===
King's College Alicante educates more than 1000 pupils, from the age 3 to 18 (Nursery - Year 13) via the English National Curriculum. The school offers preparation for entry to British, Spanish and international universities.

=== King's College, The British School of Murcia ===
The school is approximately half an hour from Murcia city centre, 10 minutes from San Javier and 25 minutes from Cartagena. It offers pupil transport to and from each nearby city.

Pupils study GCSEs, IGCSEs and A Levels in preparation for entering British, Spanish and international universities.

=== King's College, Panama ===
King's College, Panama opened in September 2012 and is situated in Clayton, a suburb of Panama City. The school educates pupils from age 3 to 18 (Nursery - Year 13)

The school also houses a division of King's Training, which like its partner in Spain, offers adult training and coaching provision to businesses and individuals in Panama.

=== King's College, Latvia ===
Opened in September 2017 and is situated in Latvia's capital city: Riga. It is the first British school in the Baltic states and educates children from the age of 3 (Nursery) and will eventually cater to pupils up to the age of 18 (Year 13).

=== King's College School, The Bahamas ===
Opened in September 2022 and is situated in Nassau, The Bahamas. King's College School, The Bahamas offers a British-style international education for children from the early years through secondary education and forms part of the global King's College Schools network.

=== King's College School, Cascais ===
Opened in September 2022 and is situated in Cascais, Portugal, near the city of Lisbon. King's College School, Cascais provides a British international curriculum for pupils from early years to secondary education and is part of the King's College Schools group.

=== King's School, The Crown, Cairo ===
Opened in 2023 and is situated in New Cairo, Egypt. King's School, The Crown delivers an English-style international education for students from nursery through secondary level and is part of the King's College Schools international network.

== See also ==
- Instituto Español Vicente Cañada Blanch - Spanish international school in London.
- British immigration in Spain.
