= Stoneham School =

Stoneham School may refer to:

- Stoneham Boys School, a former school in Reading, England, United Kingdom
- Stoneham High School, a school in Stoneham, Massachusetts, United States
