= Reddam House Sydney =

School in Woollahra & North Bondi, New South Wales, Australia

Reddam House

Location
- Woollahra & North Bondi, New South Wales; Australia; 33°53′23″S 151°15′9″E

Information
- Type: Independent, co-educational, day school
- Motto: We shall give back
- Denomination: Non-denominational
- Established: June 2000
- Principal: Warren Garratt (primary school); Simon Lees (high school)
- Employees: ~95 teachers
- Key people: Graeme Crawford (managing director)
- Enrolment: ~1102 (P–12)
- Colours: Navy blue, khaki & white
- Slogan: We shall give back
- Website: sydney.reddamhouse.com.au

Reddam House Sydney is an independent, co-educational, non-denominational day school, located in Woollahra (preschool to Year 9) and North Bondi (Years 10 to 12), both Eastern Suburbs of Sydney, New South Wales, Australia.

In 2019 Reddam House was acquired by Inspired Education Group, an international provider of for-profit schools. It subsequently switched to for-profit status and now receives no government funding.

The school was originally launched in Sydney by Graeme Crawford in June 2000, who had founded Crawford College, South Africa in 1992. It was established following a major renovation at the previous Taylors College in North Bondi.

The school attracted media attention with reports 36 percent of students, six times the state average, received "special consideration" in the 2006 HSC. Reddam House has also received media attention for being the only non-selective school to achieve a top 10 ranking in the Higher School Certificate of 2013, 2016, 2018, 2019, 2021 and 2022. In the 2022, 2023 and 2024 HSC, Reddam ranked at 5th overall, its highest ever ranking. They were ranked 10th in state in 2025.

== History ==
Reddam House started as a Years 7 to 11 school in 2001 at the current Bondi campus. The school grew quickly and a new campus at Woollahra, near Bondi Junction railway station, was opened in 2003. The new Woollahra Campus enabled the opening of the Reddam House Primary School (Years K to 6) and the restructuring of the High School into a High School (Woollahra) and a Senior School (Bondi). The Woollahra campus is also home to the Early Learning School, accepting children from one year of age.

== Facilities ==
The Reddam House Bondi campus hosts Years 10, 11 and 12. The Woollahra Campus hosts preschool to Year 9. Reddam also has brother schools started by members of the Crawford family. In Cape Town, South Africa Reddam Atlantic Seaboard and Reddam Constantia were started by Sheena Crawford-Kempster. In Johannesburg, South Africa Reddam, Bedfordview (Main Campus and BCC Campus) were started by Robert Crawford and Dalene Quayle.

== Old Reddamians ==
- Max Burgess, Newcastle Jets midfielder
- Ben Pasternak, founder of Simulate
- Zac Sapsford, Dundee United forward
- Charlize Rule, professional soccer player

== See also ==
- List of non-government schools in New South Wales
