= King's College, Panama =

British international school in Panama

Coordinates: 9.00619°N 79.56857°W

- Clayton, Panama City; Panama

Information
- School type: International school
- Established: 2012; 14 years ago
- Founder: Roger Fry (educationist)
- Headmaster: Robert Pett
- Year Groups: Pre-Nursery - Year 13
- Enrollment: c.450 (2026)
- Language: English
- Affiliation: King's Group; Inspired Education Group

King's College School, Panama is a British international school in Clayton, Panama City, Panama for students aged 2 to 18 years old. It is part of Inspired Education Group.

Established in 2012, King's College School, Panama, was the first British curriculum school in the country, making their students pioneers of British education in the region. They educate more than 450 students from 47 nationalities, who attend the Pre-Nursery division to Sixth Form.

In 2022, King's College School, Panama, built a new campus in Clayton, close to the previous school site and bordered by the Panamanian rainforest.
