= Ben Pasternak =

Australian technology entrepreneur (born 1999)

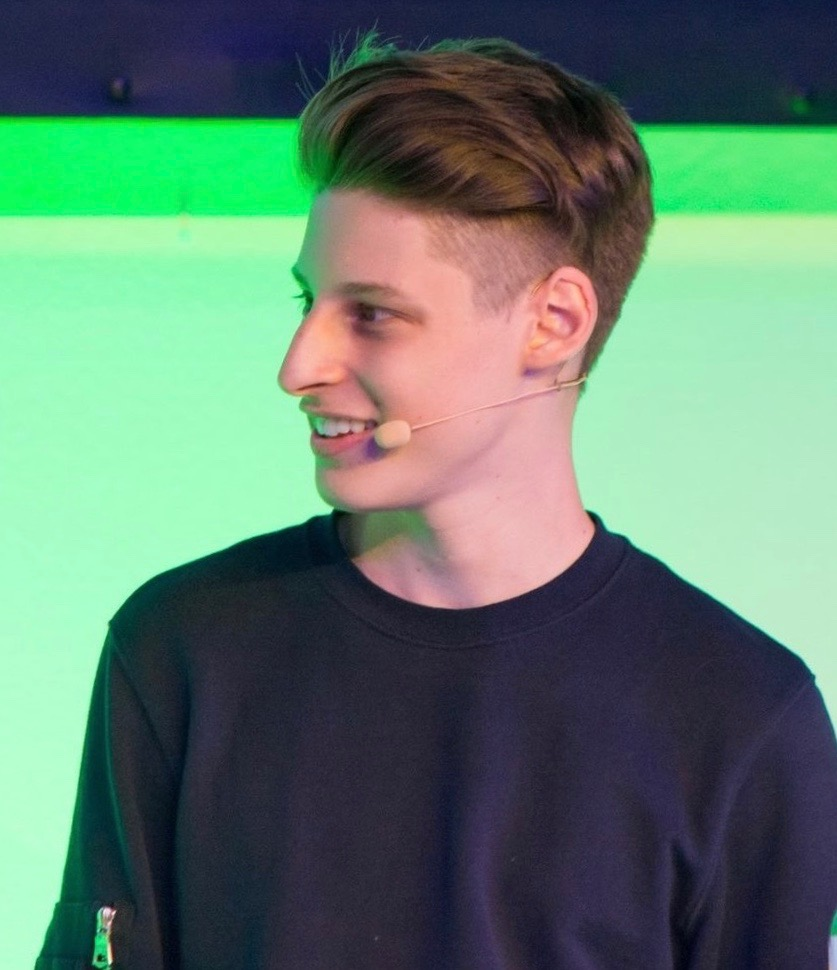
- Ben Pasternak at Heureka Conference in Berlin, June 2016
- Born: 6 September 1999 (age 27); Sydney, Australia
- Education: Reddam House; Moriah College
- Occupation: Entrepreneur
- Known for: Co-founder of Simulate; Founder of Believe

Benjamin Pasternak (born September 6, 1999) is an Australian technology entrepreneur. He is best known as the co-founder of Simulate, an American food technology company. Previously, Pasternak founded Monkey, a social networking app that enabled teenagers to video chat with like-minded people. He also founded the cryptocurrency project Believe, which has been the subject of investor litigation.

Pasternak was named as one of the world's most influential teenagers by Time in 2016. In 2021, he was included in the Forbes "30 Under 30" list in the consumer technology category.

== Early life and education ==
Pasternak was born in Sydney, Australia, to Anna Pasternak and Mark Pasternak. He has a younger brother, Jake, and a younger sister, Maya. His maternal grandfather is property developer Robert Magid. Pasternak was raised in Vaucluse in Sydney's Eastern Suburbs. He was educated at Moriah College and Reddam House.

Pasternak started developing software at the age of 15. He designed his first publicly launched mobile app, Impossible Rush, while bored in science class at school. He showed the idea to his online friend Austin Valleskey, an iOS engineer from Chicago, and the pair subsequently developed the game. The game went on to be downloaded millions of times and peaked at No. 16 on the US App Store (iOS) top charts.

A few months after declining the offers, he dropped out of high school at the age of 15 and moved to New York City to accept venture capital funding for his first company.

== Career ==
Pasternak gained online notoriety after he began working with American publicist Dini Von Mueffing..

In April 2015, Pasternak founded Flogg, a social networking app for young people.

In late 2016, Pasternak shut down Flogg and pivoted the company's focus towards building Monkey, an app that enabled teenagers to video chat with like-minded people.

In February 2018, social networking company Holla announced that it had acquired Monkey for an undisclosed sum.

=== Simulate ===
In early 2018, Pasternak co-founded Simulate. The company's mission is to upgrade the world to a positive food system. Its first product, Nuggs, is a plant-based chicken nugget substitute. Simulate's Nuggs launched in July 2019.

=== Clout – Believe ===
In January 2025, Pasternak presented his Web3 startup Clout, which focused on social media-related blockchain applications. The platform enabled the creation of cryptocurrency tokens associated with individual users who met certain follower thresholds on the app. Pasternak launched a token under the ticker $Pasternak.

In May 2025 Pasternak rebranded Clout to Believe.The company switched its focus to launching tokens for memecoins and startups similar to their own token, newly renamed from $Pasternak to $Launchcoin. On October 15, 2025, Pasternak announced another renaming of his token from $Launchcoin to $Believe. This sparked a dispute as the $Believe token had 33% more supply than the $Launchcoin token. The extra supply was given to Pasternak and the Believe team without locking period.

In December 2025, allegations were made by Avi Patel, founder of Kled.ai, regarding Pasternak’s handling of his supply of the $Kled company token, including claims of token sales following a prior fee arrangement. The valuation of $Believe dropped, from the migration date in October to December 17, the publication date of the mentioned accusations, by 90% in total.

On December 25, 2025, Burwick Law announced preparations for a class action lawsuit against Pasternak and the Believe platform. The lawsuit was filed in the United States District Court for the Southern District of New York on March 23, 2026. It alleged that Pasternak and his platform Believe conducted a coordinated campaign involving multiple tokens that resulted in significant investor losses. Mr. Burwick described the system as a cycle following the system of generating hype with promotional activity, followed by rapid price appreciation and a catastrophic decline.

== Legal issues ==
In April 2026, Pasternak was charged in New York with one count of second-degree strangulation and two counts of assault with intent to cause physical injury in connection with an alleged incident that occurred on March 31, 2026. The alleged victim was identified by multiple media outlets as social media creator Evelyn Ha, with whom Pasternak had previously been in a relationship. Pasternak pleaded not guilty to all charges.

Through his attorney and public relations representative Dini Von Mueffing, he denied the allegations, stating that his actions constituted lawful self-defense and disputing Ha's account of the incident. The case remained pending before the New York criminal court as of June 2026, and no conviction had been entered.
