= British School of Bahrain =

Coordinates: 26.1629°N 50.4715°E

The British School of Bahrain
- Hamala; Bahrain

Information
- School type: Private
- Established: 1995
- Head teacher: Liz Stanley
- Grades: Nursery to Year 13
- Language: English
- Accreditation: IGCSE, GCE Advanced Level
- Website: www.thebsbh.com

The British School of Bahrain (BSB) is a selective, coeducational, independent kindergarten-through-Year 13 school for students between the ages of 3 and 18 located in Hamala, Bahrain. The school comprises three sections: the Infants provides for children in Key stage 1, from 3–6 years old; the Juniors for children in Key stage 2, from 7–10 years old, and the Senior School for children from 11 to 18 years old.

The school is included in The Schools Index as one of the 25 "schools to watch".

== History ==
The British School of Bahrain was founded in January 1995 with the aim of providing British education to the expatriates. Originally operating out of a villa in Adliya, the school has since relocated to Hamala where it serves over 2,800 students.

In 2018, the school was acquired by Inspired, an international provider of private schools. In 2019, Gulf Weekly reported that it was having space issues, with 2,650 pupils, and that Inspired was considering building a separate senior school nearby. It was included in Carfax Education's Global School Index in 2024, and was the only school in Bahrain included. The school continued to be owned by Inspired under CEO Nadim Nsouli.

== Curriculum ==
The school follows the National Curriculum for England and Wales with some adaptations to comply with local law and customs. Students sit IGCSE and GCE Advanced Level examinations in year 11 and 13 respectively. BTEC courses are also offered.

== Students ==
As of March 2021, the school has an enrolment of 2,898 students, comprising 88 nationalities, of which 1,023 are seniors, 973 are juniors and 902 are infants. The average class size is 26 students.

== Notable alumni ==
- James Arthur, the 2012 winner of the ninth series of the British musical competition The X Factor was a student at the school for three years.

== See also ==
- List of educational institutions in Bahrain
