= King's Group =

International education and training company

- Industry: Education
- Founded: 1969; 57 years ago in Madrid, Spain
- Founder: Sir Roger Fry
- Headquarters: Worcestershire, United Kingdom
- Area served: Global
- Key people: Elena Benito Molina
- Products: King's College Schools, King's Training, Nexalia Services, Kings Interhigh
- Owner: Inspired Education Group
- Number of employees: Over 1100 (2026)

King's Group is an international education and training company part of the Inspired Education Group, a co-educational, non-denominational, international provider of for profit private schools founded in 2013 by Lebanese-British businessman Nadim Nsouli and is headquartered in London. It provides education for children aged 1 year up to 18 years, and to date has around 80,000 students globally, across 111 schools in 24 countries.

King's School were originated in Spain when King's College, Madrid was opened in 1969 by Roger Fry but is headquartered in Tenbury Wells in the United Kingdom. King's Group is the parent company of King's College schools and also owns other educational and non-educational entities: King's College, Madrid, King's College International, King's Training (Spain and Panama) and Nexalia Services.

In February 2014 King's Group was granted permission from the Department for Education (DfE) in London to sponsor Academies and Free Schools in England. This new area of the business is called King's Group Academies. Currently, there are five academies in the UK, with another set to open this year.

The business provides pre-school, primary and secondary education to nearly 8000 students of more than 80 nationalities, in the United Kingdom, Spain, Panama and Germany, and employs over 1200 education professionals, specialists and staff.

King's College schools give their pupils an academic, all-round liberal, Christian based education. The schools do not practice strong belief standings, but instead live by the values encased on the school crest of “Honestly, Faith and Courage”.

In 2018, King's Group were awarded the Education Investors Award, for being the winner in the Private Education Group of the Year category.

In 2019, King's Group joined Inspired Education Group, a leading global premium schools group operating in Europe, Asia-Pacific, Africa, the Middle East and Latin America. And in 2022, the latest King's College School was inaugurated in The Bahamas, with a newly built 10-acre state-of-the-art campus of significant architectural value, offering the highest quality educational facilities.

== Company history ==
King's Group was initiated by British-born teacher Roger Fry (educationist) in 1969. The first school in the Group was opened in the Chamartín district of Madrid. The school initially opened its doors to 70 pupils in 1969, and by 1974 nearly 500 pupils attended the school. King's College soon outgrew its premises and by 1976 ten houses of differing size and design were in use in the Chamartín area of Madrid.

After occupying these premises for some nine years, the school moved in 1978 to its present, purpose-built premises in the residential area of Soto de Viñuelas (Tres Cantos), a 30-minute car journey from Madrid city centre. The school maintained its title;

== King’s College, The British School of Madrid (Soto de Viñuelas) ==
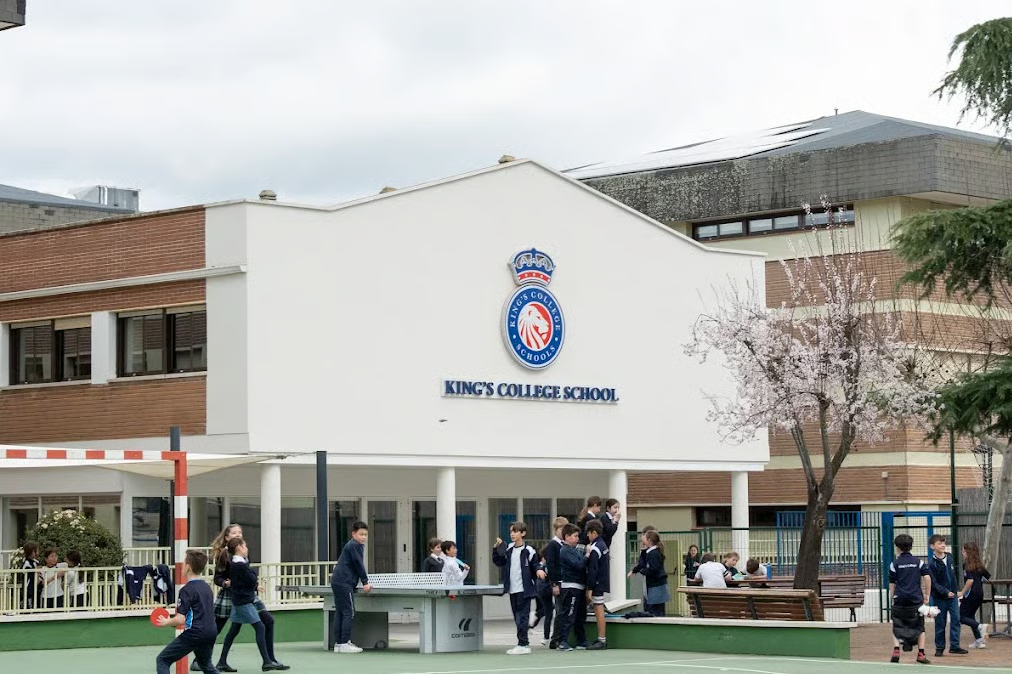
King's College School, Soto de Viñuelas entrance

King's College School, Soto de Viñuelas opened in 1978, the main school site caters for more than 1200 pupils between the ages of 2 and 18 years (Pre-Nursery to Year 13). An additional 'baby unit' or 'pre-pre-nursery' was recently added, catering for students as young as 20 months old. It is located in a 12-acre site in the residential area of Soto de Viñuelas, Tres Cantos. Between the city and the Guadarrama mountains.

Facilities now include a variety of outdoor recreational areas, a floodlit artificial football pitch, a 25m heated indoor swimming pool, tennis courts, volleyball and basketball courts, 5-a-side and 11-a-side football pitches and a horse riding school & dedicated sports centre (built in 2017). The school also has 2 libraries and 3 multimedia centres, as well as computers and interactive whiteboards in all classrooms. There is a large auditorium, an art studio, 10 science laboratories and a Music School which boasts 2 music rooms and 6 smaller practice rooms.

The school is a member of HMC, COBIS,NABSS, BSA and CICAE.

As of 2026 King's College in Madrid altogether has about 1,250 students, with 70% of them being Spanish and the next-largest group of students being British.

== King’s Infant School, Chamartín ==
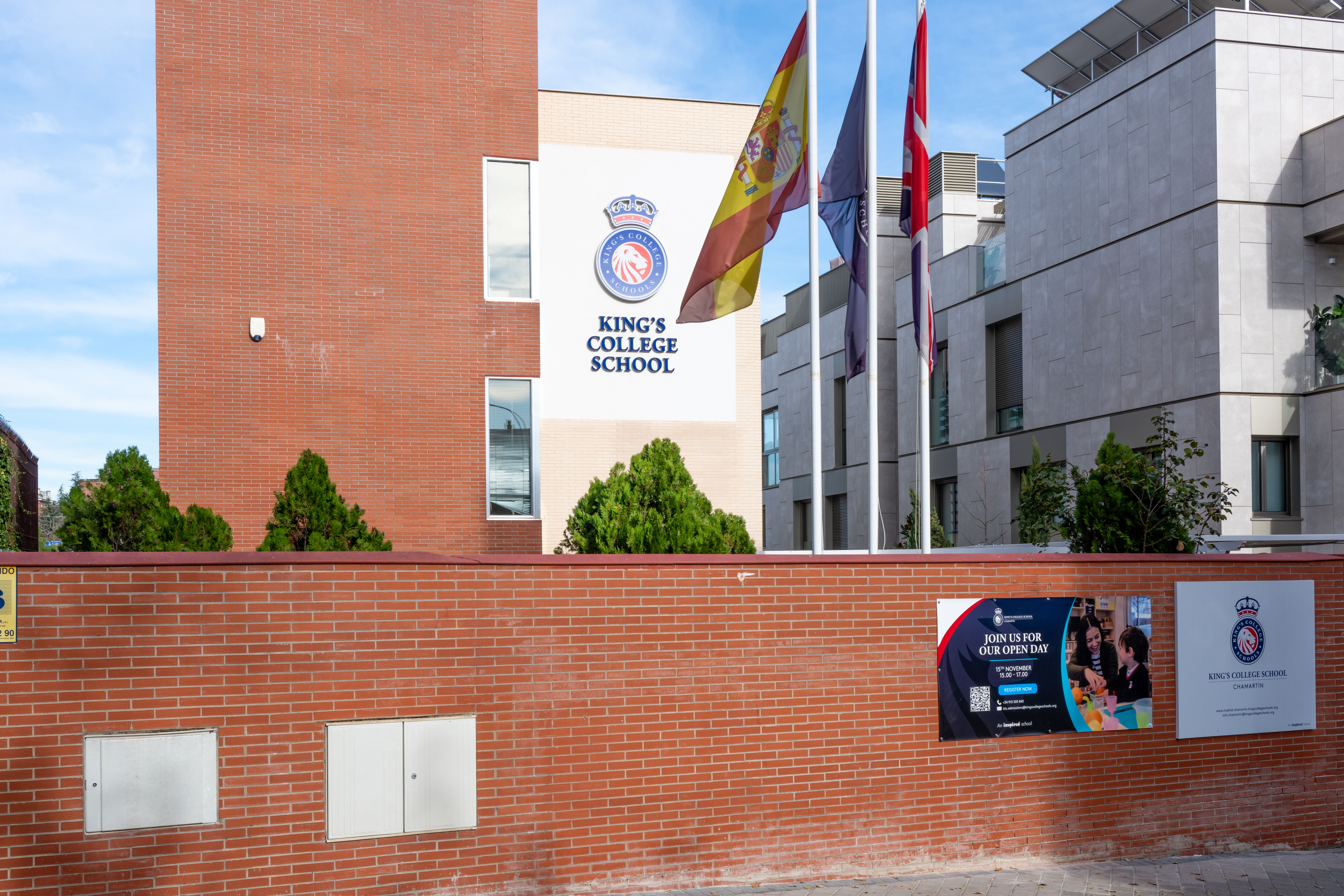
King's Infants School, Chamartin Entrance

The early 1980s saw a turning point in the Group's history, with the second school being added to the network, back in the area of the founding location in the Chamartín area of Madrid, close to where the original school was located before moving to King's College School, Soto de Viñuelas.

== King's Training ==
At the same time, a secondary facet of the Group was introduced: King's Training, addressing the need for adult language learning and coaching.

== Nexalia Services ==
Five years later in 1987, Nexalia Services (formerly Servicios Lasalle) was inaugurated, an internal company to look after the growing catering and maintenance needs of the King's College schools.

== King's College Saint Michaels ==
In the 1990s the UK boarding school was added to the school network.A secondary Age Boarding school, which offered a British education on UK soil to international students. The school was set on 10 Hectares of grounds, and offered a small, friendly, international environment. Academic studies are under the English National Curriculum and included GCSE, A Levels, University Foundation Programme. The school also offered a dedicated summer course to students from all over the world, who wish to sample the UK and its cultural offerings. KCSM was a Specialist English language provision school, and support in English language is provided to all students which plays a major role in the curriculum with almost all students going on to study at universities in Britain or other English speaking countries. It closed on the 30th of June 2020 as a consequence of the COVID-19 pandemic.

== King’s College, The British School of Alicante ==
As the new century turned, the school network further increased, and a fourth school in the south of Spain was opened by Julio Herranz.

Located 10 minutes from the city centre of Alicante, King's College Alicante educates more than 1000 pupils, from the age 3 to 18 (Nursery - Year 13) via the English National Curriculum. The school offers preparation for entry to British, Spanish and international universities.

== King's College International ==
In the same year, Sir Roger King's College International, another company trading under King's Group, which offered courses to young children (not already pupils of a King's College school) to be able to study abroad for an academic year or attend a summer camp to learn English.

== King’s College School, The British School of Madrid (La Moraleja) ==
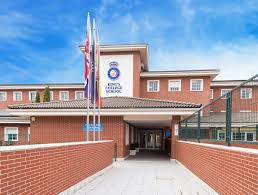
King's College School, La Moraleja Main Entrance

In 2007, a third school in Madrid was purpose-built on the new development of land in the residential area of La Moraleja in Madrid. The school operates across two adjacent sites within La Moraleja: a Junior Site and a Senior Site, serving different age groups. The school houses over 600 pupils from age 2 to 16 years (Pre-Nursery to Year 11). In Year 12, pupils are automatically offered a place to continue their studies at the Sixth Form in sister school King's College, Soto de Viñuelas.

== King’s College, The British School of Murcia ==
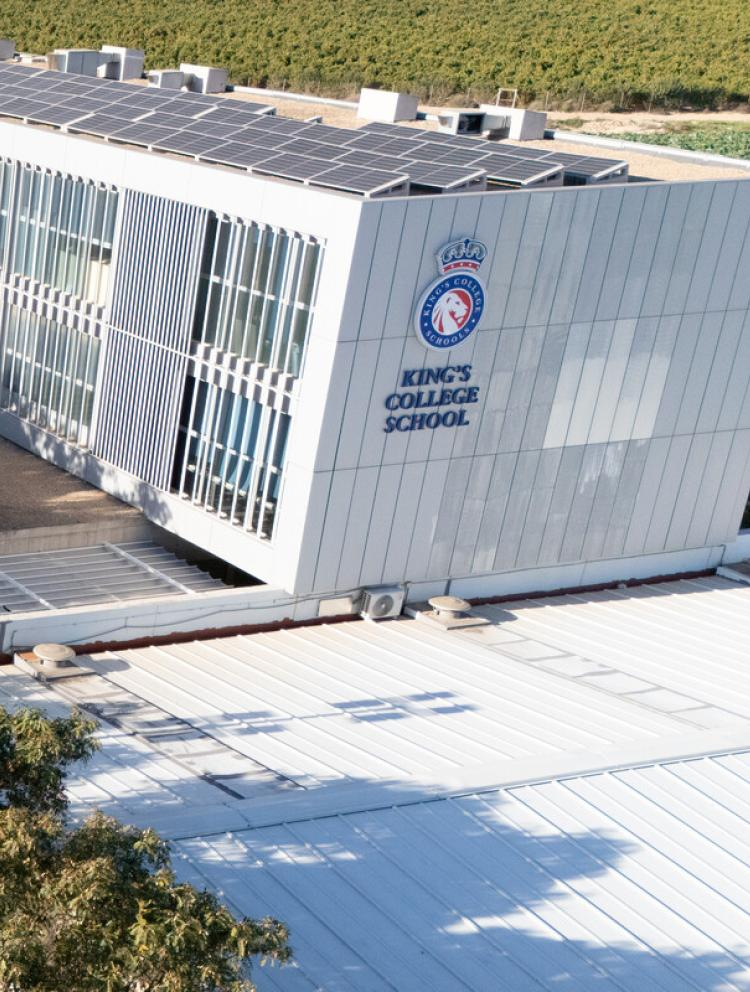
King's College, The British School of Murcia Campus

Situated in La Torre Golf Resort. King's College Murcia offers the English National Curriculum to pupils from the age of 18 months to 18 years (Pre-Nursery - Year 13) since 2007 being the second school in the south of Spain.

The school is approximately half an hour from Murcia city centre, 10 minutes from San Javier and 25 minutes from Cartagena. It offers pupil transport to and from each nearby city.

Pupils study GCSEs, IGCSEs and A Levels in preparation for entering British, Spanish and international universities.

== King’s College, The British School of Panama ==
King's College, Panama opened in September 2012 and is situated in Clayton, a suburb of Panama City. The school educates pupils from age 3 to 18 (Nursery - Year 13)

The school also houses a division of King's Training, which like its partner in Spain, offers adult training and coaching provision to businesses and individuals in Panama.

== King's Training, Panama ==
While opening King's College, The British School of Panama, the Group also took the opportunity to establish an adult Training arm of the organisation. Aiming to optimise B2B resources, define strategies and deliver results.

== King's Group Academies ==
In 2014 King's Group was granted permission from the Department for Education (DfE) in London to sponsor Academies and Free Schools in England.

== King's Infant School, The British School of Elche ==
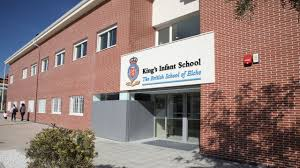
King's Infants School Elche Main Entrance

The ninth school in the Group, King's Infant School, The British School of Elche , was opened in September 2017, in Elche. It was closed shortly afterwards, with all students transferred to King’s College, Alicante.

== King's College, The British School of Latvia ==
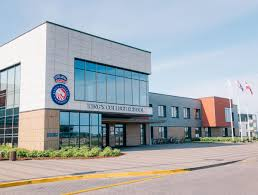
King's College School Latvia Main Entrance

Opened in September 2017 and is situated in Latvia's capital city: Riga. It is the first British school in the Baltic states and educates children from the age of 3 (Nursery) and will eventually cater to pupils up to the age of 18 (Year 13).

== King's College, The British School of Frankfurt ==
Opened in August 2018 and was situated in Friedrichsdorf, near Frankfurt, Germany. The school was the first British curriculum school in the city and provided the English National Curriculum for pupils from nursery to secondary education. It formed part of the King's College Schools international network before closing in 2021.

== King's College School, The Bahamas ==
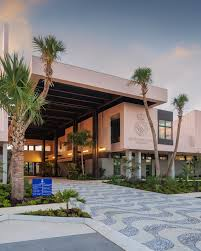
King's College School, The Bahamas Main Entrance

Opened in September 2022 and is situated in Nassau, The Bahamas. King's College School, The Bahamas offers a British-style international education for children from the early years through secondary education and forms part of the global King's College Schools network.

In 2025, the school expanded its provision with the opening of a purpose-built boarding facility, King’s Beach Lodge, located on Love Beach. The residence offers full-time, weekly, and flexible boarding options for students in Year 7 and above, accommodating approximately 50 boarders in modern beachfront accommodation with study areas and communal facilities.

The school also places emphasis on co-curricular activities, including sports, performing arts, languages, STEM clubs, and leadership opportunities. Students have access to facilities such as science laboratories, sports areas, arts spaces, a gym, and a swimming pool as part of a modern campus environment.

== King's College School, Cascais ==
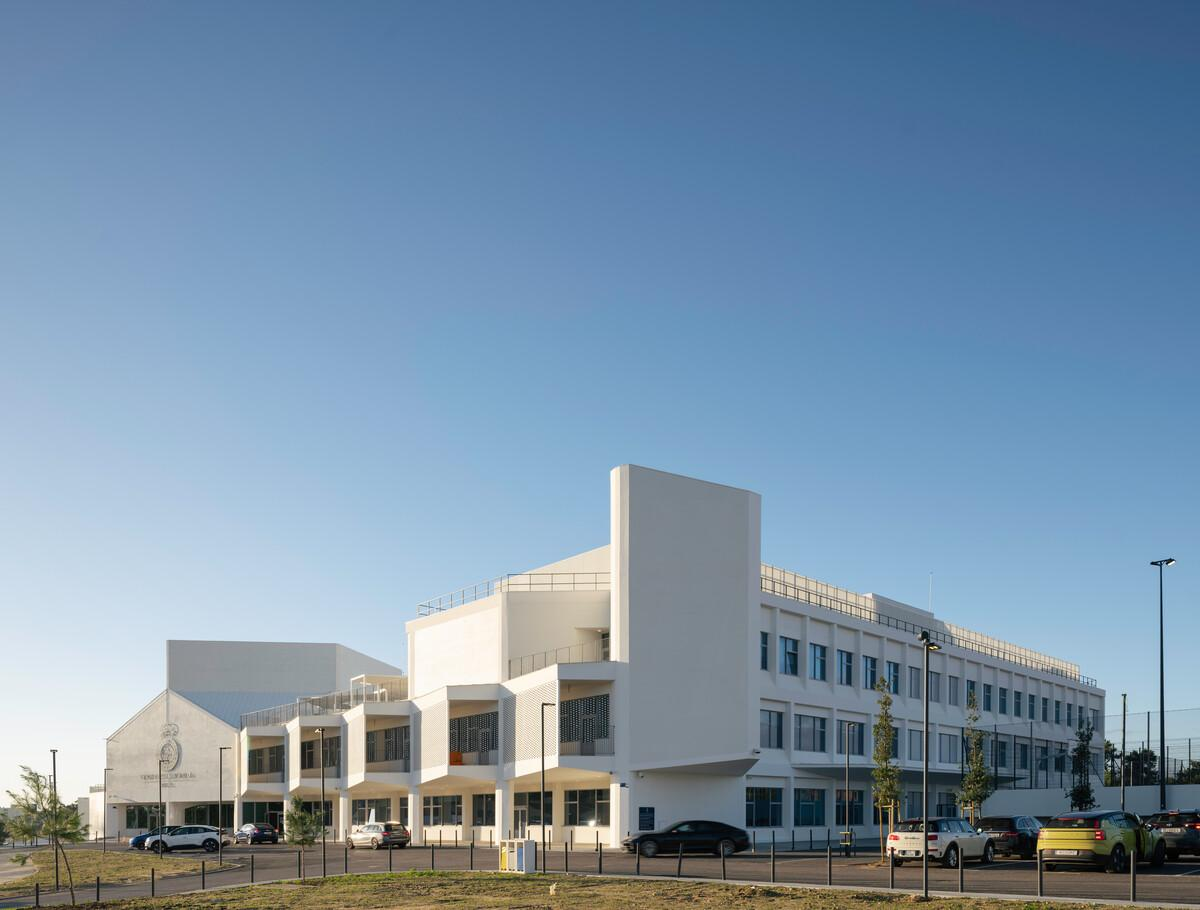
King's College School, Cascais Campus

Opened in September 2022 and is situated in Cascais, Portugal, near the city of Lisbon. King's College School, Cascais provides a British international curriculum for pupils from early years to secondary education and is part of the King's College Schools group.

== King's School, The Crown, Cairo ==
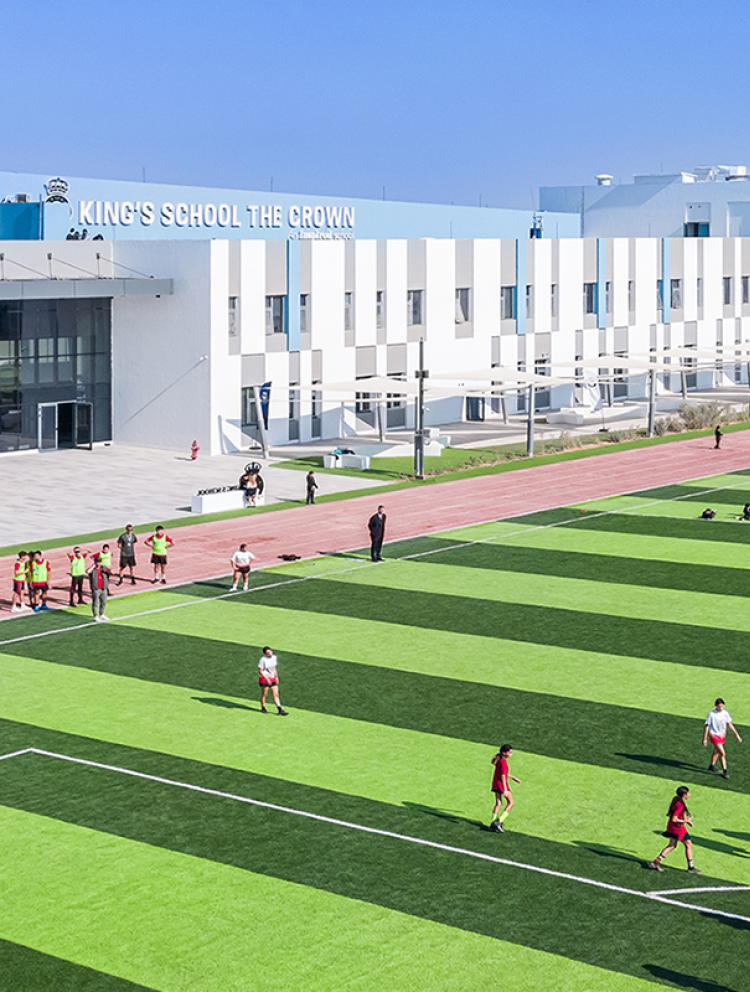
King's School, The Crown, Cairo

Opened in 2023 and is situated in New Cairo, Egypt. King's School, The Crown delivers a British-style international education for students from nursery through secondary level and is part of the King's College Schools international network.

The campus in New Cairo includes modern teaching facilities such as science laboratories, specialist classrooms for arts and technology, sports facilities, and dedicated spaces for early years provision. The school places emphasis on both academic achievement and co-curricular development, offering activities in areas such as sports, music, performing arts, STEM, and leadership programmes.

As a member of the Inspired Education Group, the school is part of an international network of schools offering opportunities for collaboration, student exchanges, and shared educational resources across multiple countries.

== Evolution of King's Group ==
| School | Location | Year of opening |
|---|---|---|
| King's College, The British School of Madrid | Soto de Viñuelas, Madrid | 1969 |
| King's Infant School, The British School of Madrid | Chamartín, Madrid | 1982 |
| King's Training | Madrid, Spain | 1982 |
| Nexalia Services (originally Servicios Lassalle) | Madrid, Spain | 1987 |
| King's College Saint Michael's | Worcestershire, UK | 1992-2020 |
| King's College, The British School of Alicante | Alicante | 2000 |
| King's College International | Madrid, Spain | 2000 |
| King's College School, The British School of Madrid | La Moraleja, Madrid | 2007 |
| King's College, The British School of Murcia | Murcia | 2007 |
| King's College, The British School of Panama | Panama | 2012 |
| King's Training Panama | Panama | 2012 |
| King's Group Academies | United Kingdom | 2014 |
| King's Infant School, The British School of Elche | Elche | 2017-2020 |
| King's College, The British School of Latvia | Riga, Latvia | 2017 |
| King's College, The British School of Frankfurt | Frankfurt, Germany | 2018 - 2021 |
| King's College School, The Bahamas | Nassau, Bahamas | 2022 |
| King's College School, Cascais | Cascais, Portugal | 2022 |
| King's School, The Crown | Cairo, Egypt | 2023 |
