= Reddam House =

Reddam House is a group of schools managed by Inspired Education Group. The group of schools includes:

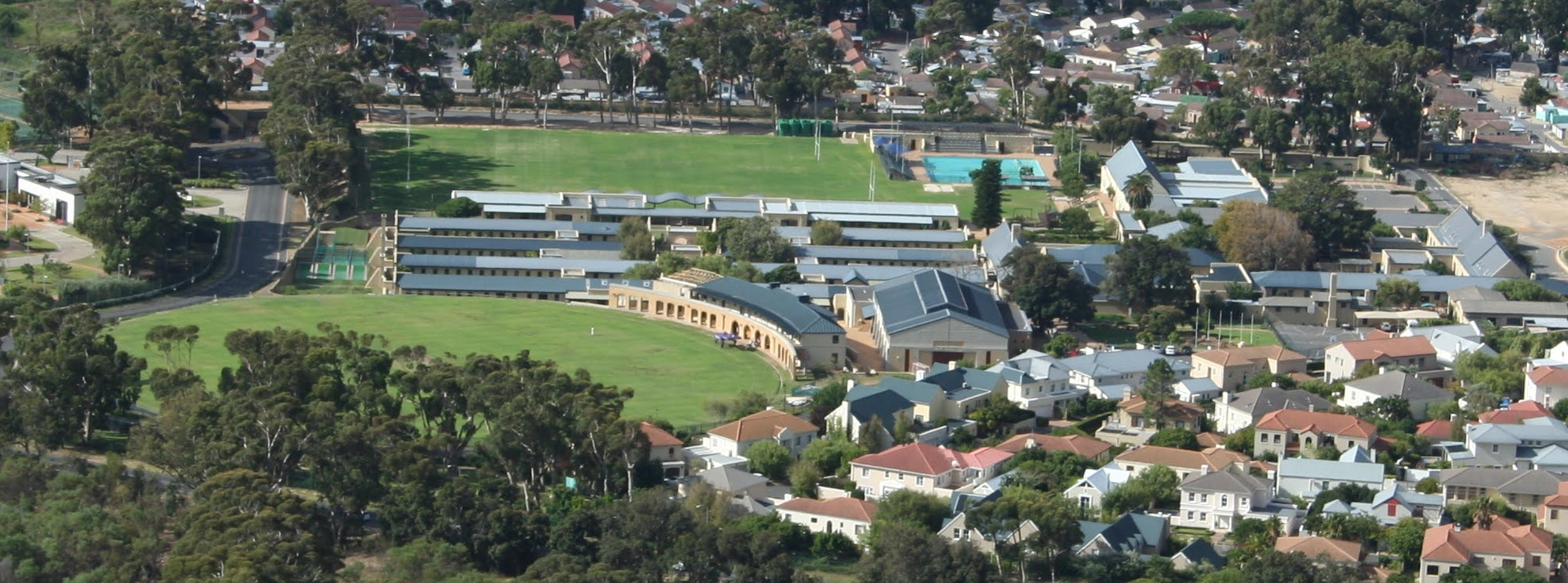
An aerial view of the Reddam House Constantia campus

- Reddam House Bedfordview, a school in Bedfordview, South Africa
- Reddam House Berkshire, a school in Berkshire, England
- Reddam House North Shore, a school in North Sydney, Australia
- Reddam House Sydney, a school in the Eastern Suburbs of Sydney, Australia
- Reddam House Ballito, a school in Ballito, South Africa
- Reddam House Atlantic Seaboard, a school in Atlantic Seaboard, South Africa
- Reddam House Constantia, a school in Constantia, South Africa
- Reddam House Durbanville, a school in Durbanville, South Africa
- Reddam House Umhlanga, a school in Umhlanga, South Africa
- Reddam House Helderfontein, a school in Fourways, South Africa
- Reddam House Waterfall, a schol in Midrand, South Africa
