= St. John's International School (Belgium) =

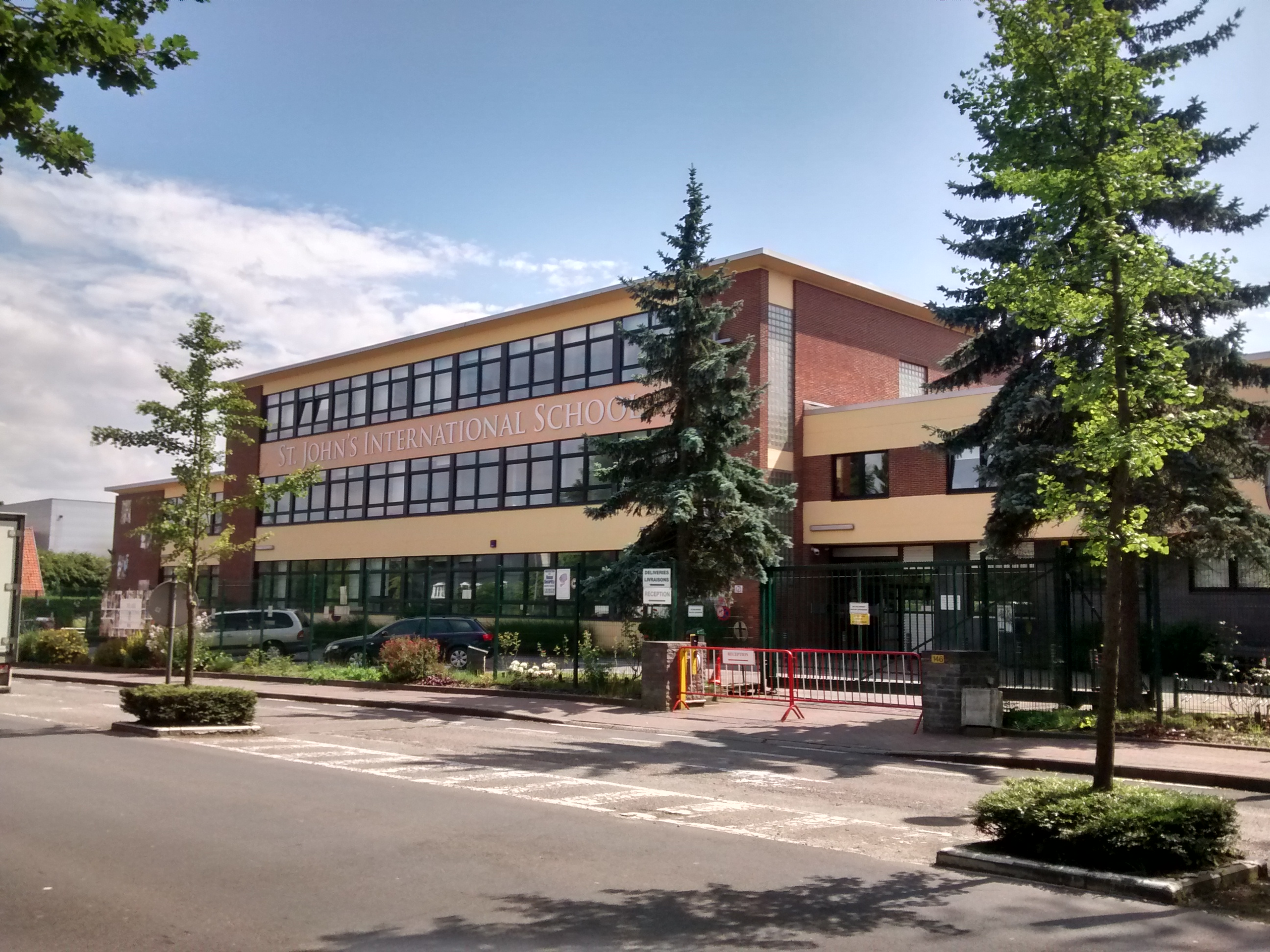

Location
- Drève Richelle 146; Waterloo, Walloon Brabant, 1410; Belgium
- 50°42′18″N 4°24′52″E

Information
- Type: Private, Day; International school
- Established: September 1964
- Principal: Dr. Kevin Foyle
- Grades: PK-12
- Gender: Co-educational
- Campus size: 4.9 hectares (12 acres)
- Campus type: Suburban
- Team name: Lions
- Accreditation: MSA, CIS, IBO
- Website: www.stjohns.be

St. John's International School is an international school located in Waterloo, Belgium. It provides education from day-care to 12th grade, the last year of high school. It offers the International Baccalaureate Diploma program, AP programs are also offered by the school.

The school is part of the Inspired Education Group, founded in 2013 by Lebanese-British businessman Nadim Nsouli and headquartered in London. It provides education for children aged 1 year up to 18 years, and to date has around 80,000 students globally, across 110+ schools in 24 countries. The school has over 800 students and over 100 teaching staff.

== History ==
St. John’s is a private international school, founded in 1964 in Brussels. In 1969 it moved to its current campus in Waterloo. The high school was added gradually from 1971 onwards. The International Baccalaureate programme was adopted in 1978. In 2016, the school was bought by the Inspired Group of schools.

== Curriculum ==
The International Baccalaureate Primary Years, Middle Years and Diploma programmes are offered. Advanced Placement (AP) courses are also available.

== Athletics ==
Using the team name "The Lions", the school competes regularly in the ISSTs (International School Sports Tournament), among others. The school has two gymnasiums and an Astroturf soccer field.

=== Sports ===
Sports played at St. John's include Football (Soccer), Volleyball, Cross Country, Swimming, Basketball, Rugby, Track and Field, Baseball, Softball and Golf. Most sports include Middle School "A" and "B" teams, and High School "Junior Varsity" and "Varsity" teams.

==== Basketball ====
St. John's won 3 consecutive Div. 1 ISST Varsity Boys Basketball Championships in 2003, 2004, 2005.

==== Volleyball ====
In 2004, the Lions Div. 1 girls' varsity volleyball team won the school their first volleyball ISST's in 11 years. On November 13, 2010, the Lions Div. 1 boys' varsity volleyball team finished 3rd in the volleyball ISST's, and in November 2012 the boys won the Div. 1 tournament.

==== Track and field ====
In 2004, St. John's secured themselves another ISST win; a boys' varsity track and field ISST win. The scored a first place in the event, making it the school's second ISST win for anything in under a year. In 2008, St. John's won the track and field ISST's which it repeated in 2011.

==== Softball ====
In 2006 and 2008, the St. John's softball team won the Div. 2 Softball ISST's.

==== Football ====
===== Girls =====
In 2007, the Varsity Girls squad won the Division II Football ISSTs in Vienna, beating Cairo American College 4-1 in the final. In the following years, they have achieved respectable results in Division I, placing 4th place in 2009, and 6th in 2010.

In 2013 the Varsity Girls squad came in third place for Division I Football ISSTs in London, beating TASIS 3-0. The team finished the tournament with three shutouts in five games, only conceding four goals.

===== Boys =====
On November 13, 2010, the Varsity Boys football team won the ISSTs for the first time.

== Notable former pupils ==
- Jérôme d'Ambrosio, Belgian Formula One racing driver
- Princess Maria Laura of Belgium, Archduchess of Austria-Este
