= King's Academy Prospect =

Location
- Cockney Hill; Reading, Berkshire, RG30 4EX; England
- 51°26′49″N 1°01′08″W

Information
- Type: Academy
- Local authority: Reading
- Trust: King's Group Academies
- Department for Education URN: 136876 Tables
- Ofsted: Reports
- Headteacher: David Littlemore
- Gender: Coeducational
- Age: 11 to 18
- Enrolment: 1200
- Website: www.kgaprospect.uk

King's Academy Prospect is a coeducational secondary school and sixth form located in West Reading, Berkshire, England. Since the site opened in 1956, it has also carried the names Prospect School, Stoneham Boys School and Westwood Girls School.

== History ==
Stoneham Secondary School for Boys opened in April 1956 and Westwood Girls School opened in April 1958. Prospect School was formed in 1985 by combining Stoneham Boys School and Westwood Girls School. To this day the school has two entrances because the combined Stoneham and Westwood buildings were originally built close to each other and each had its own entrance.

Prospect School became an academy on 1 July 2011 and is now sponsored by the King's Group Academies. The school was later renamed King's Academy Prospect to reflect this.

== Admissions ==
The school caters for those in Key Stage 3 and Key Stage 4 and Sixth Form Key Stage 5, between the ages of 11 and 18. The school follows the National Curriculum. The school currently has 1,200 students. The school is part of the Multi Academy Trust King's Group Academies (KGA).

== Buildings ==
King's Academy Prospect is situated on a 34-acre green site on the western outskirts of Reading. A capital investment of £5.6 million resulted in refurbished Science and Art facilities, a modern Learning Centre as a base for the Sixth Form and a building that houses a Hair and Beauty salon, Motor Vehicle and Construction teaching yards and high level computer suites. The school has a total of 7 Blocks consisting of:

- A block = Geography, History, R.E., Music, Art and Drama, Health and Social Care
- B block = Science and Technology
- C block = Science, Business, Accounting, ICT and Computing
- D block = English, Mathematics, Sociology and Psychology
- Sports Hall = (E Block) P.E.
- Sixth Form Centre = (F block) Modern Foreign Languages and PE
- Loddon Building = (G block) Hair and Beauty, Technology, Construction and Media Studies

== Curriculum ==
The school teaches: English Language, English Literature, Mathematics, Science, French, German, History, Geography, Religious Studies, Art, Business Studies, Health and Social Care, Computing, ICT, Music, Drama, Dance, Physical Education, Technology (including Food, Graphics, Resistant Material and Textile Technology), Sociology, PSHE/Well-Being, Accountancy.

The school offers a range of subjects for GCSE & A-Level; most of the above and many more including Motor Vehicle Maintenance, Construction, Hairdressing and Media Studies.
