= Simulate (company) =

American food technology company

SIMULATE
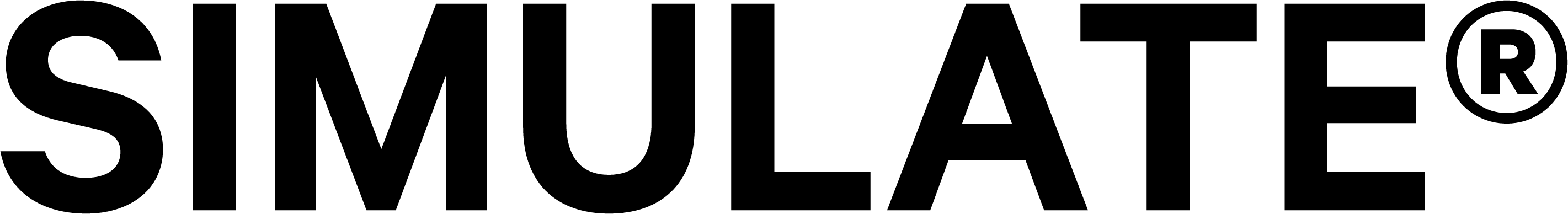
- Formerly: NUGGS LABS, INC
- Type: Privately held company
- Industry: Food technology
- Founded: 2018
- Founders: Ben Pasternak; Sam Terris
- Fate: Acquired by Ahimsa Companies in late 2024.
- Headquarters: New York City, United States
- Website: simulate.com

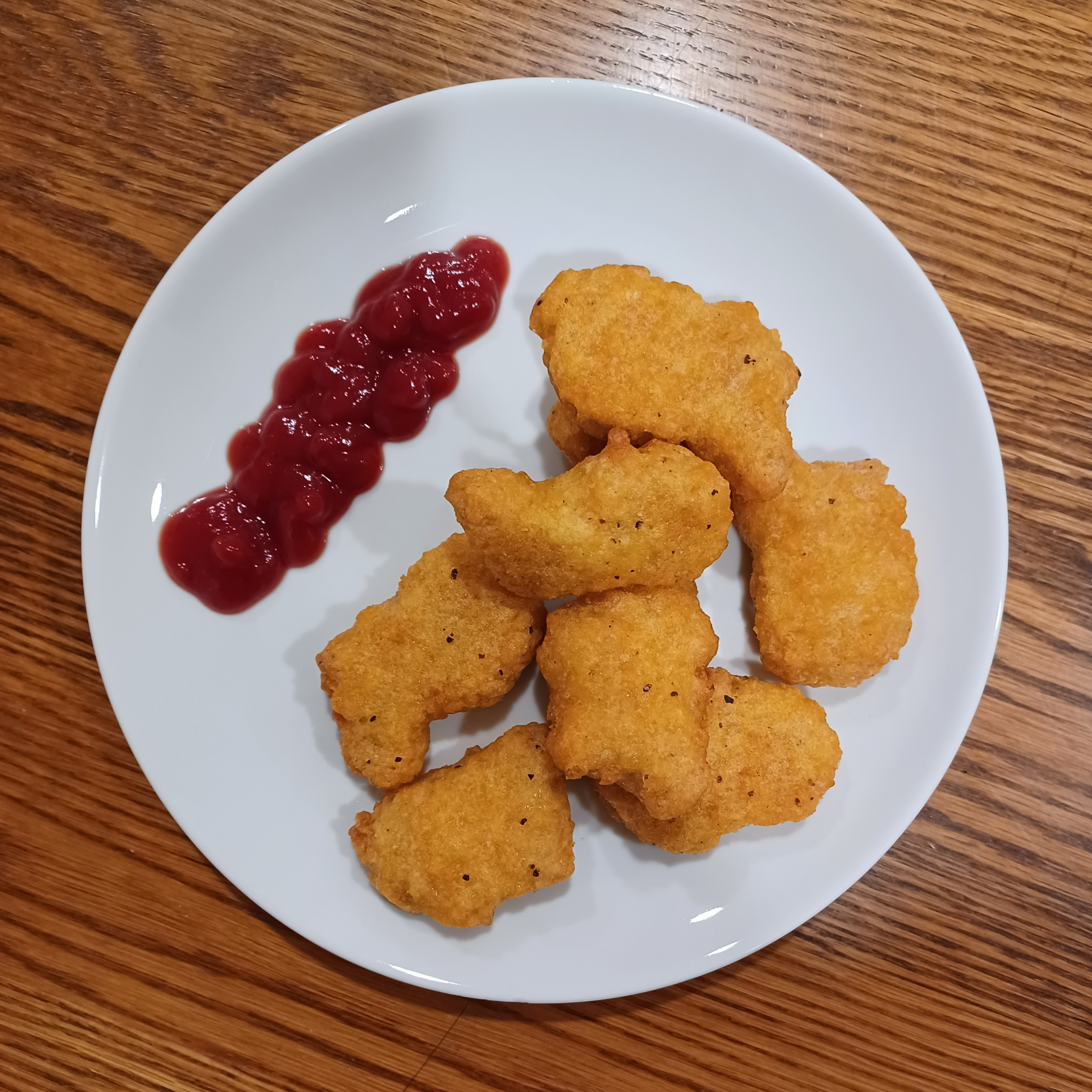
NUGGS with ketchup

SIMULATE (formerly known as NUGGS) is a food technology company headquartered in SoHo, Manhattan which manufactures plant-based alternatives to meat products. The company was founded in 2018 by Ben Pasternak and Sam Terris and was acquired by plant-based investor Ahimsa in 2024.

The company's main product is NUGGS, a plant-based chicken nugget alternative. SIMULATE also makes a plant-based chicken patty product called DISCS.

== History ==
The product NUGGS was launched in July 2019 via a direct-to-consumer website. NUGGS began sale in retail stores such as Whole Foods Market, Walmart, Sam's Club, and Target in early 2021. The company also sells its products through ghost kitchens in San Francisco and Los Angeles. In July 2019, SIMULATE (then NUGGS) announced that it was changing its name to SIMULATE. The company plans to expand internationally, first to Canada. Simulate was acquired by Ahimsa Companies in late 2024. Post acquisition the products are no longer being stocked at grocers and the domain has since been listed for sale.
