= Reddam House Berkshire =

Location
- Winnersh, Wokingham, Berkshire, RG41 5BG; England
- 51.4154°N 0.8837°W

Information
- Type: Private day and boarding school
- Motto: We shall give back
- Established: 1816
- Department for Education URN: 110137 Tables
- Head: Rick Cross
- Gender: Co-educational
- Age: 3 months to 18 years
- Enrolment: 670
- Houses: Drake House (Year 10-13) Blake House (Year 7-9) The Loft (Year 7-10 (only boys))
- Colours: Navy Blue, Khaki & White
- Former Pupils: Old Reddamians
- Website: http://www.reddamhouse.org.uk/

Reddam House is an elite private boarding school in the English county of Berkshire, UK. Set in 125 acres of private woodlands, it was founded as Bearwood College in 1961 at the site of King George III's Bearwood Palace under the patronage of Queen Elizabeth II.

== History ==
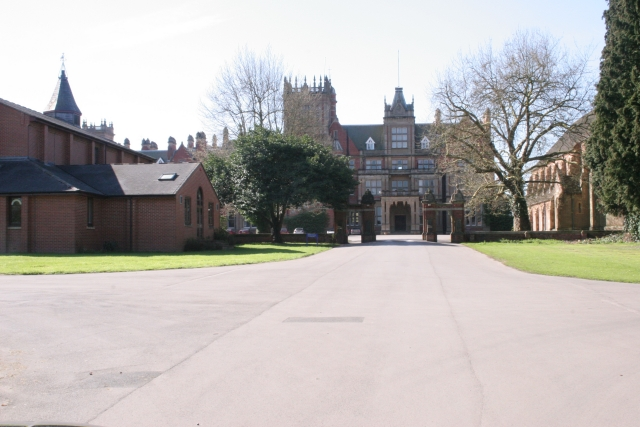

In 1816, John Walter II (1776–1847), owner of The Times newspaper, purchased the 304-acre estate known as "Bear Wood" from the crown estate of King George III, on which the school is now located. By 1822, John Walter had constructed a modest Georgian villa on the exact spot on which the present mansion still stands. In 1865, John Walter's son, John Walter III (1818–1894), also owner of The Times, decided to tear down his father's house and employed the Scottish architect Professor Robert Kerr to design and build a new house at Bearwood. Construction lasted from 1865–1874 and cost £150,000 (£17,200,000 today). The Bearwood Mansion is one of the largest Victorian country houses in England. Nikolaus Pevsner described it as "the climax of country mansions, in its brazen way one of the major Victorian monuments of England". Bearwood has also been described as "a Victorian monument of stone and oak", "a Palace of a Prince of the Press" and "the Second Palace of Berkshire" (after Windsor Castle).

During the Great War (1914–1918), Bearwood was occupied by Canadian soldiers who had been fighting on the Western front. In mid-1915 John Walter V, offered the mansion to the Canadian army as a convalescent hospital. In 1919, John Walter V sold the mansion to Sir Thomas Devitt and Sir Alfred Yarrow, two merchants from London. The two gifted the magnificent mansion and 100 acres of surrounding woods and parkland to the Royal Merchant Navy School.

The Royal Merchant Navy School was established in 1827 in the City of London. Originally called The Merchant Seamans' Orphan Asylum, the purpose of the orphanage was to clothe, care for and to educate children whose fathers were lost at sea. In 1861, the orphanage moved to Snaresbrook where Prince Albert, the Prince Consort laid the foundation stone for the new orphanage. This would be the last public ceremony of its kind performed by Prince Albert before his untimely death just six months later, on 14 December 1861. In 1902, the orphanage was given the title of "Royal" by King Edward VII, and so was renamed the Royal Merchant Seaman's Orphanage. In 1922, King George V ordered that the word "orphanage" be dropped from the name of the organisation, and so it was renamed The Royal Merchant Navy School. In 1921, the school moved to Sindlesham near Wokingham, Berkshire into the Victorian mansion, Bearwood House.

In 1961, the Royal Merchant Navy School became an all-boys school. In 1965/66 the school changed its name to Bearwood College. In 1991, Her Majesty Queen Elizabeth II opened the Bearwood Theatre as Patron of the college, and in 1995 the school became co-educational again. Bearwood College faced a period of uncertainty as a protracted legal proceedings threatened its future on the site which was resolved in 2010 at the High Court, London. Declining student numbers and the cost of maintaining the mansion, boarding houses, school buildings and the estate led to the closure of the college in June 2014.

The school and mansion were subsequently bought by the Reddam House group in 2014, and in 2015 Reddam House Berkshire was established on the site. Reddam House, Berkshire is part of the international portfolio of 27 schools run by the Reddam House group. The current principal is Mr Rick Cross. The school has around 670 students and offers day places as well as weekly and termly boarding for all ages.

== Facilities ==
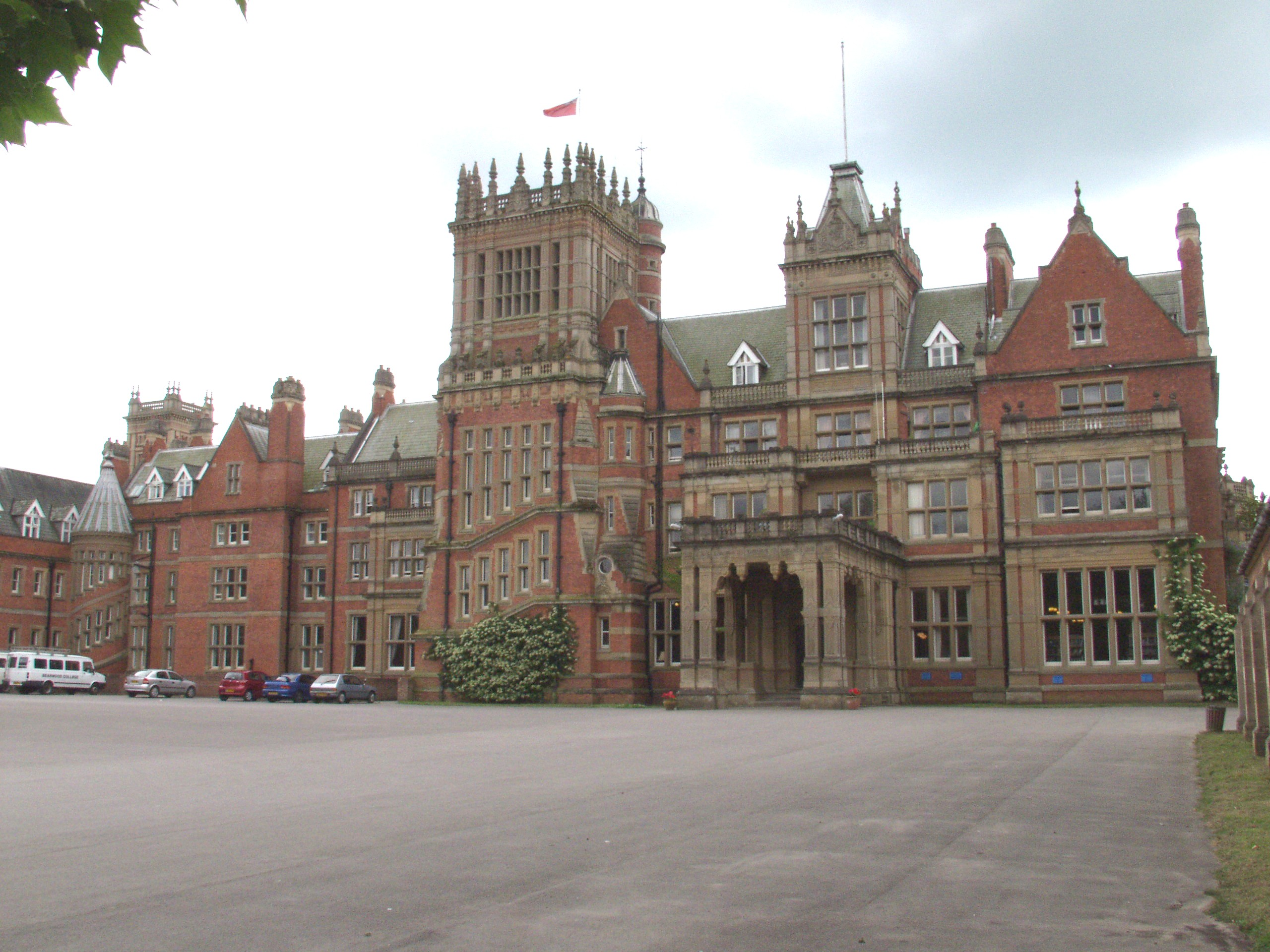

Reddam House Berkshire is equipped with a private chapel, 3 indoor swimming pools, 2 gymnasiums, 4G Astro turf hockey pitch, 5 netball courts, 4 tennis courts, 8 cricket pitches, multiple football grounds, and 6 rugby pitches. The school also owns private sailing, hunting, polo, and archery clubs with separate paintball and climbing facilities within the school grounds. There are also multiple horse riding facilities present on campus.

The school theatre was built in 1991 and inaugurated by Queen Elizabeth II. It was refurbished in 2015 and hosts the annual Palace Opera.

== Reddam House Group of Schools ==
Reddam House Group was established in 2000 in Cape Town, South Africa. Reddam House group is part of Inspired Education Group, which provides financial backing, logistical support, and professional oversight for its schools and educators.

Other group members include Reddam House Sydney and Reddam House North Shore.

== Notable former pupils ==
- Douglas Chalmers, British Army officer
