= Roger Fry (educationist) =

English educationist and teacher (born 1943)

Sir Roger Fry CBE FRSA
- Born: 10 January 1943 (age 83); Drayton, Portsmouth, Hampshire, England
- Education: King's College London; University of London Institute of Education
- Occupations: Educationist; teacher
- Known for: Founding King's College, Madrid
- Children: 6
- Awards: OBE; CBE; Knight Bachelor (2012); Commander of the Order of Civil Merit; Commander of the Civil Order of Alfonso X, the Wise (2015)

Sir Roger Fry CBE FRSA (born 10 January 1943) is an English educationist and teacher. He is known for founding King's College, Madrid in 1969 and for his work in British international education and Anglo-Spanish educational relations.

== Early life and education ==
Fry was born in Drayton, Portsmouth, Hampshire. He was educated in Portsmouth before continuing his studies at King's College London and the University of London Institute of Education.

== Career ==
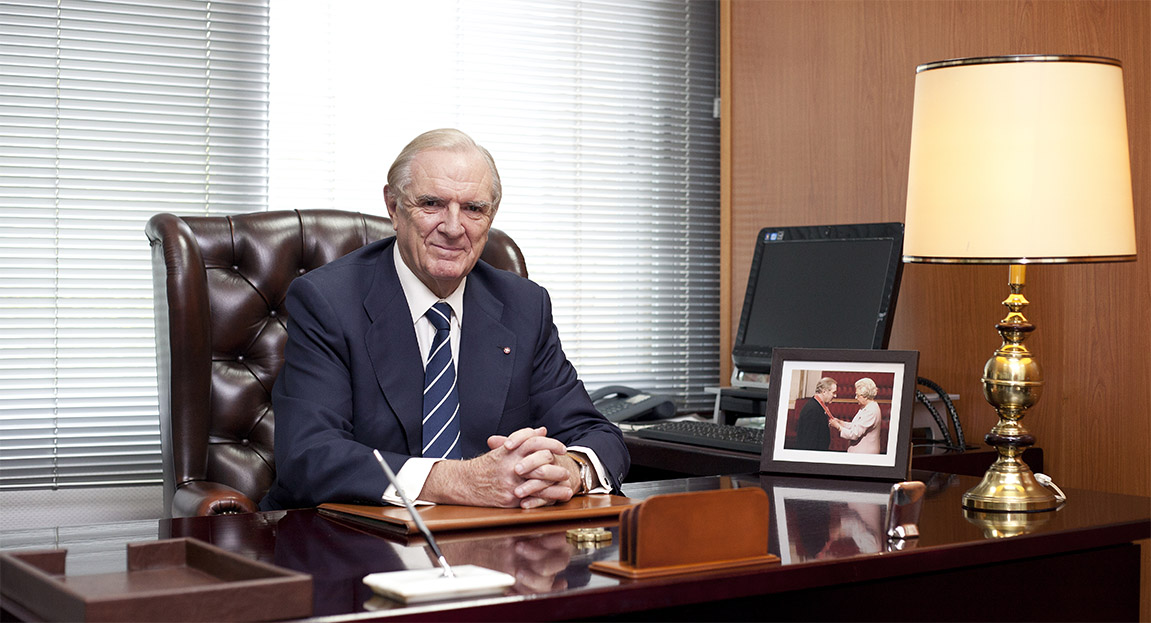
Roger Fry, the founder of King's College International

Fry began his career as a teacher in Portsmouth after university. He later moved to Spain, where he worked as a lecturer at a private university.

In 1969, Fry founded King's College, Madrid, a private English-curriculum school in Madrid, which he named after his alma mater. The school later became part of a wider group of British international schools. Fry subsequently established other British schools in Spain, elsewhere in Europe and in Central America, as well as a boarding school for overseas students in England. In 2013, King's College, The British School of Panama, was officially inaugurated in Clayton, Panama; Fry, then president and legal representative of King's College, hosted the inauguration.

King's College Madrid became a member of the overseas membership of the UK's Headmasters' and Headmistresses' Conference, later known as HMC.

Fry has also been associated with Anglo-Spanish educational and cultural organisations. In 1980, he created the British Hispanic Foundation in Madrid, an organisation concerned with cultural and educational links between Spain and the United Kingdom. In 1988, he organised the exhibition Wellington y España: la alianza de dos monarquías, which was inaugurated by Queen Elizabeth II during her official visit to Madrid. The foundation later developed activities including the Foro Hispano Británico and the Reina Victoria Eugenia Chair with the Complutense University of Madrid. He has also been active in the British Chamber of Commerce in Spain and has served as its national president.

In 1996, Fry was elected chair of the London-based Council of British Independent Schools in the European Communities, later known as the Council of British International Schools (COBIS). He served as chair until 2011.

During his tenure, COBIS broadened its membership beyond Europe and developed links with UK independent school associations, including HMC, the Girls' Schools Association, the Independent Association of Prep Schools, the Society of Heads and the Association of Governing Bodies of Independent Schools. The organisation was renamed the Council of British International Schools in 2007.

COBIS later became involved in arrangements for the inspection of British schools overseas. Fry worked with UK education bodies and government departments in relation to the recognition of inspection schemes for British schools outside the United Kingdom. In 2008, The Independent reported that the Council of British International Schools had welcomed UK government plans for inspections of schools abroad advertising a British education, and quoted Fry on the role of British international schools. In 2010, the British government announced arrangements for the inspection of British schools overseas.

After stepping down as chair of COBIS, Fry was appointed honorary president of the organisation. In 2012, he was knighted for services to British education internationally and to UK-Spain cultural relations.

Following changes to inspection arrangements for British schools overseas, Fry was later associated with the Association of British Schools Overseas (AoBSO). He served as chair of the association and later became its first president.

In 2014, Fry founded King's Group Academies, a multi-academy trust in England. The trust is registered in Portsmouth and includes schools in Portsmouth, including College Park and Northern Parade, as well as schools in other parts of England.

Fry was a governor of the Royal Grammar School Worcester and is listed as one of its honorary patrons. He is a member of the Council of the Imperial Society of Knights Bachelor.

== Personal life ==
Fry has been married twice and has three sons and three daughters.

For many years, Fry was also involved in the Church of England as a lay reader and was a lay member of the General Synod of the Church of England representing the Diocese in Europe.

== Honours ==
Fry was appointed an Officer of the Order of the British Empire and later Commander of the Order of the British Empire.

He was knighted in 2012 for services to British education internationally and to UK-Spain cultural relations.

In 2004, he was awarded an honorary Doctor of Letters by the University of Portsmouth.

In 2008, he was elected a Sir Thomas Pope Honorary Fellow of Trinity College, Oxford.

He was appointed Commander of the Order of Civil Merit in Spain.

In 2015, he was appointed Commander of the Civil Order of Alfonso X, the Wise by the Spanish government.

In 2009, he received the International Relations Medal of the Complutense University of Madrid in recognition of his educational and foundational work.

He was appointed a patron of the Royal Grammar School Worcester in 2021.
