= Inspired Education Group =

International provider of private schools

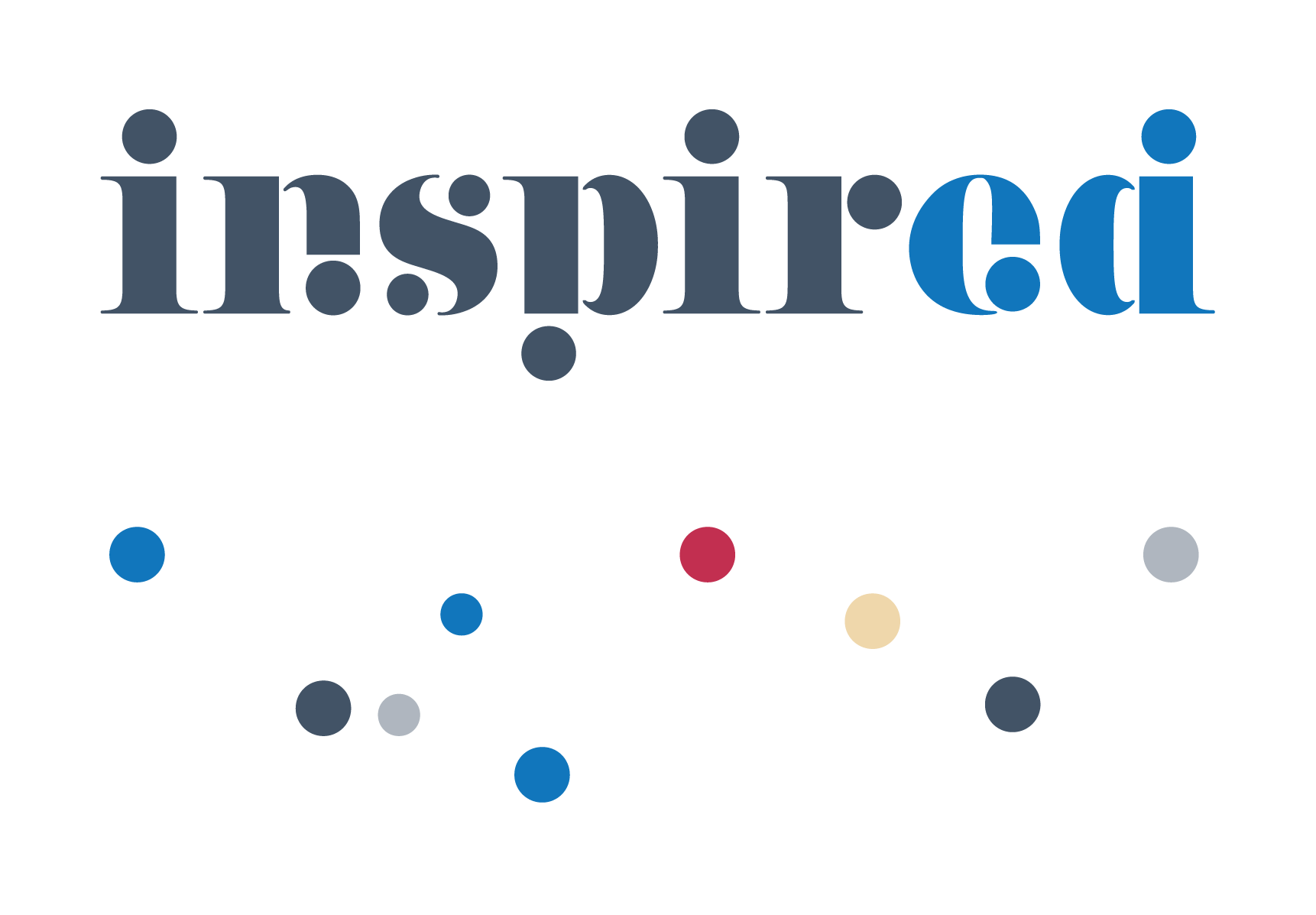
- Company type: Private
- Industry: Education
- Founded: 2013
- Headquarters: London
- Area served: Europe, the Middle East, Asia, Africa, Australia, New Zealand and Latin America.
- Website: https://inspirededu.com/

Inspired Education Group is a co-educational, non-denominational, international provider of for-profit private schools. It was founded in 2013 by Lebanese-British businessman Nadim Nsouli and is headquartered in London, United Kingdom. The group offers education for children aged 1 to 18 years and currently serves approximately 95,000 students worldwide across 125 schools in 30 countries.

== History ==
Inspired Education Group was founded in 2013 by Nadim M. Nsouli, a businessman and co-founder of the Lyla Nsouli Foundation for Children's Brain Cancer, following the group's acquisition of Reddam House in South Africa. Since then, Reddam House has acquired and established nine schools in South Africa.

- Reddam House Atlantic Seaboard
- Reddam House Ballito
- Reddam House Bedfordview
- Reddam House Constantia
- Reddam House Durbanville
- Reddam House Fourways
- Reddam House Helderfontein
- Reddam House Umhlanga
- Reddam House Waterfall

Along with the group's "flagship school," Reddam House Berkshire, near Wokingham, England. In 2015, the school grounds in Winnersh were acquired from Bearwood College.

Nsouli, the founder, CEO and Chairman, has previously worked as a lawyer and an investment banker and has led the group since its inception. Inspired's strategy has been described as "buy and build," involving the acquisition of existing schools as well as the construction of new institutions. The group maintains offices in London, Milan, Auckland, Bogotá, Johannesburg, and Dubai.

Schools in other European countries that are part of the Inspired group include St. George's International School in Switzerland, St. John's International School in Belgium, St. Louis School in Italy, and Sotogrande International School in Spain. In the Middle East, the group acquired the British School of Bahrain. Inspired's Latin American schools include Blue Valley School in Costa Rica, Colegio San Mateo in Colombia, and Cambridge College Lima in Peru. By 2017, Inspired operated more than 30 schools, and by 2018, it educated over 35,000 students across 46 schools.

In 2018, Inspired acquired part of New Zealand's largest private education provider, ACG Education’s schools division, from Pacific Equity Partners for approximately NZ$500 million.

By 2020, Inspired was described as "the world's largest premium education provider," with 60 schools across five continents. The group also secured investments from firms such as Oakley Capital and TA Associates.

In May 2021, Inspired acquired Wey Education PLC, which operated two online education brands, InterHigh and Academy21. In November 2021, Inspired merged its online schools, InterHigh and King's College Online, under the new name King's InterHigh.

In May 2022, Stonepeak, a US-based private equity firm, invested €1 billion in exchange for a minority stake in Inspired.

In 2023, Inspired acquired the Alpha Plus Group, which included schools such as Wetherby School and Pembridge Hall.
