= British school =

British school may refer to

Schools in the United Kingdom

- Schools established in the 19th century by the British and Foreign School Society
  - British Schools Museum in Hitchin, a surviving British and Foreign School Society school

Schools elsewhere

- Member schools of the British Schools Foundation
- Member schools of National Association of British Schools in Spain
- The British School - Al Khubairat
- British School of Archaeology in Jerusalem, now known as the Kenyon Institute
- British School of Amsterdam
- The British School in the Netherlands
- British School at Athens
- British School of Bahrain
- British School of Barcelona
- British School of Brussels
- The British School, Caracas
- The British School of Guangzhou
- The British School, Kathmandu
- The British School of Lomé, Togo
- The British Schools of Montevideo
- British School - Muscat
- The British School, New Delhi
- British School in Rome
- The British School in Tokyo
- British Schools of America
  - British American School of Charlotte
  - British School of Boston
  - British School of Chicago
  - British School of Houston
  - British School of Washington
- British College
- Doha British School

== See also ==
- British International Schools (disambiguation)
