= Jumeirah English Speaking School =

Coordinates: 25.1799°N 55.2430°E

Information
- Type: British international school
- Motto: Achieving Excellence Together Forever
- Established: 1975
- Authority: KHDA
- Director: Shane O'Brien
- Grades: Foundation Stage to Year 13 (KG1–Year 13)
- Gender: Co-educational
- Enrollment: 2,000+ (2024)
- Language: English
- Campus type: Urban and suburban
- Slogan: Achieving Excellence Together Forever
- Website: www.jess.sch.ae

Jumeirah English Speaking School (JESS) was a British international school located in Dubai, United Arab Emirates. Established in 1975, the school operates two campuses: the original campus in Jumeirah, which serves primary students, and a larger campus in Arabian Ranches offering education from Foundation Stage through Year 13. JESS follows the National Curriculum for England and offers the International Baccalaureate Diploma Programme in the senior years. The school has consistently received "Outstanding" ratings from the Knowledge and Human Development Authority (KHDA) and is featured among the top 150 private schools worldwide by The Schools Index.

== History ==
=== Jumeirah campus ===
JESS was founded in 1975 to meet the growing demand for British education among expatriate families in Dubai. At the time, the only similar school, the Dubai English Speaking School (DESS), was at full capacity.

Initially located in an apartment near the Dubai Clock Tower, the school began with just 17 pupils in two classes. In 1977, His Highness Rashid bin Saeed Al Maktoum allocated land in Jumeirah for a permanent campus. The campus marked its 40th anniversary in 2015.

=== Arabian Ranches campus ===
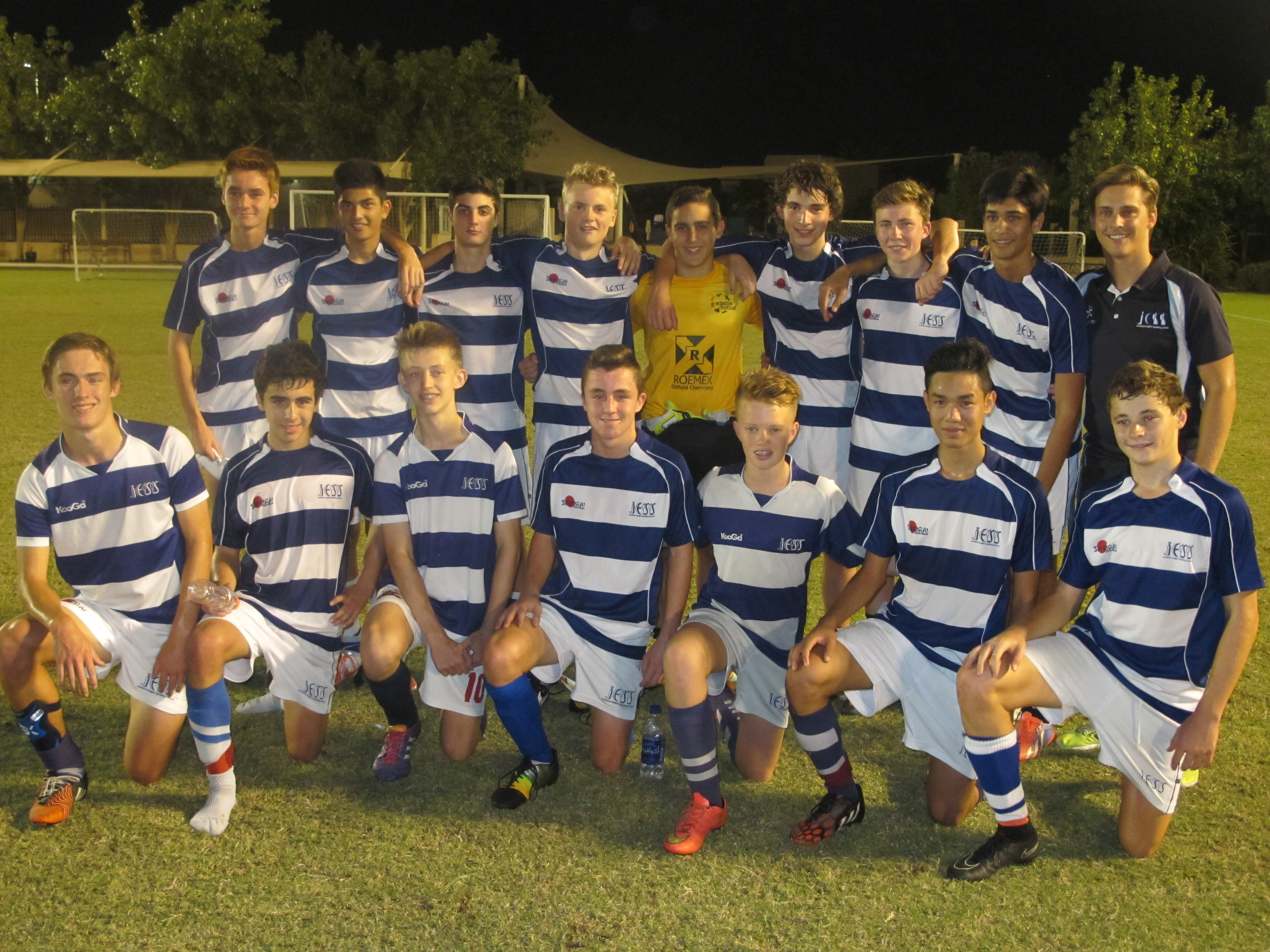
A JESS Secondary School football team at the Arabian Ranches campus

In response to a surge in Dubai's expatriate population during the early 2000s, JESS established a second campus at Arabian Ranches in September 2005. It was the first school in Dubai to be built as part of a planned residential development.

The campus opened with 573 students and initially offered primary education and Years 7 and 8. In 2009, a sixth form centre was added, launching the IB Diploma Programme. By that year, the campus provided a continuous education from KG1 to Year 13.

== Campus ==
Both JESS campuses feature open-air layouts with shaded areas and climate-controlled interiors. Shared facilities include:

- Two swimming pools per campus
- Libraries and ICT suites
- Physical education halls
- Multi-purpose sports fields and netball courts
- Art and design technology workshops

The Arabian Ranches site also offers:

- Purpose-built cafeteria
- Exhibition and examination hall
- Music centre
- Lecture theatre
- Auditorium
- Sixth form building with common room, study space, dining area, and lockers

== Curriculum ==
JESS offers a curriculum based on the National Curriculum for England and the International Baccalaureate:

- Foundation Stage and Primary: National Curriculum for England
- Secondary (Years 7–11): Follows the National Curriculum, culminating in GCSE examinations
- Sixth Form (Years 12–13): Offers three pathways:
  - The IB Diploma Programme (IBDP): six subjects (three at Higher Level and three at Standard Level), plus Theory of Knowledge, CAS, and an Extended essay
  - IB Courses Programme: five or six standard-level subjects and mandatory CAS
  - BTEC Extended Diploma (introduced in 2017): courses in Art, Business, and Sport

== Extracurricular activities ==
=== General activities ===
Extracurricular activities vary each term depending on staff availability and student interest. They include:

- Arts: pottery, drama productions, photography, dance, and school publications
- Music: choir, instrumental lessons, and music clubs
- Enrichment: book club, Sudoku, history society, film club
- Wellness: yoga, cooking, aikido
- Adventure: skiing and rock climbing

=== Sports ===
The school provides a wide range of sports:

- Team sports: football, rugby, netball, basketball, volleyball, hockey
- Individual sports: swimming, athletics, badminton, gymnastics, trampolining
- Specialty: horse riding and golf

JESS teams participate in inter-school competitions both locally and abroad.

== Recognition ==
- Listed in The Schools Index among the 150 top private schools globally and the top 15 in the Middle East
- Strong IB Diploma Programme performance with graduates attending leading universities worldwide
- Frequent representation in academic and athletic competitions

== KHDA inspection reports ==
The Knowledge and Human Development Authority conducts annual school inspections in Dubai, rating institutions on a scale from "Unsatisfactory" to "Outstanding". JESS has consistently received "Outstanding" ratings since 2010.

School	2015–16	2014–15	2013–14	2012–13	2011–12	2010–11	2009–10	2008–09
JESS Jumeirah	Outstanding	Outstanding	Outstanding	Outstanding	Outstanding	Outstanding	Good	Good
JESS Arabian Ranches	Outstanding	Outstanding	Outstanding	Outstanding	Outstanding	Outstanding	Good	Good

== See also ==
- British International Schools
- Education in the United Arab Emirates
- List of schools in the United Arab Emirates
