= Hans Klok =

Dutch magician and illusionist (born 1969)

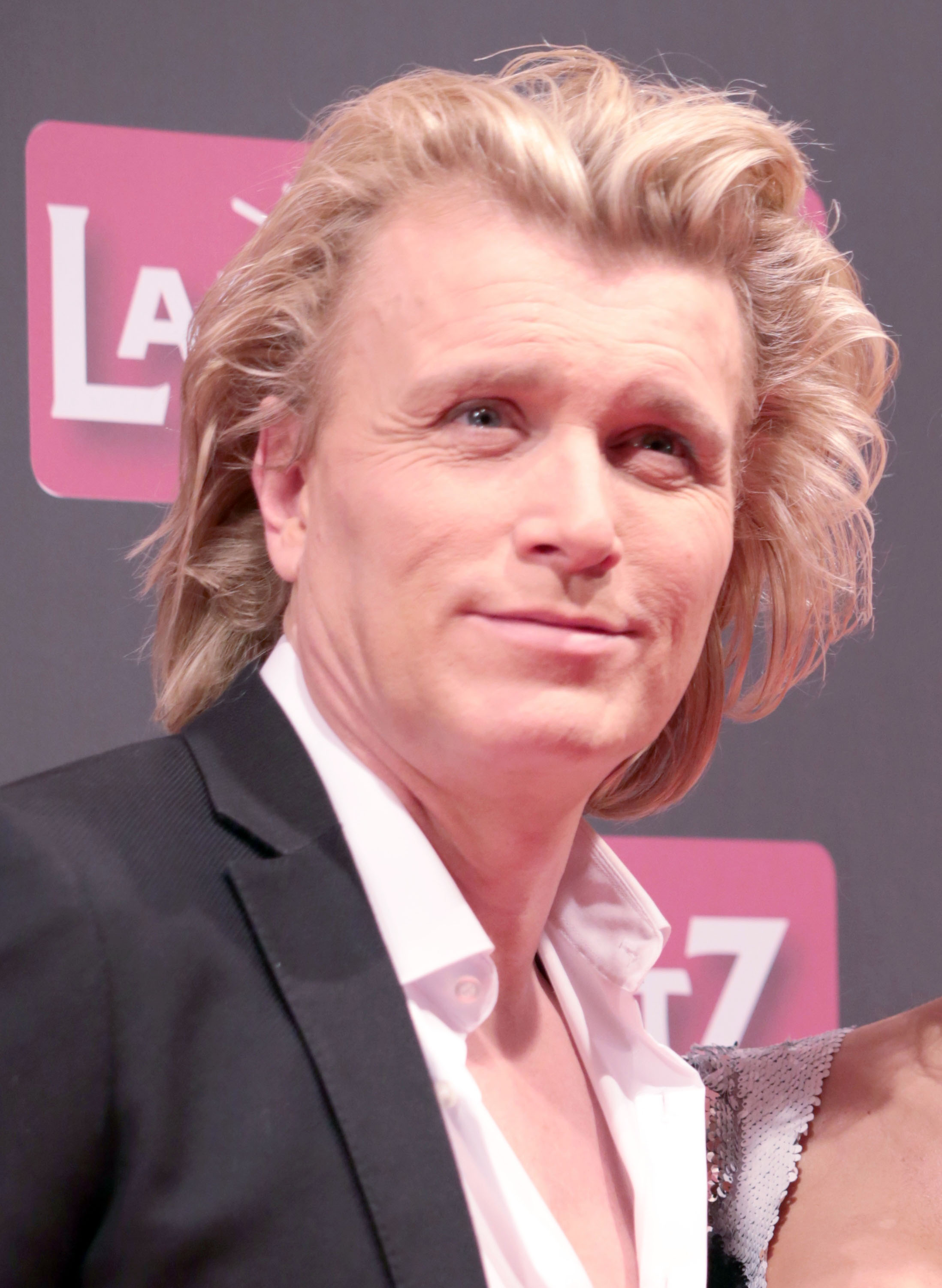
- Klok in 2018
- Born: Johannes Franciscus Catharinus Klok; 22 February 1969 (age 57); Purmerend, Netherlands
- Occupations: Magician, illusionist

Johannes Franciscus Catharinus "Hans" Klok (born 22 February 1969) is a Dutch magician and illusionist.

== Biography ==
Klok was born in Purmerend, North Holland. On his tenth birthday, he received a magic set as a present and began performing for friends at their birthday parties.

Klok started his professional career in magic as a teenager. At the age of fourteen, he became youth champion of the Netherlands and Europe in conjuring, and won the Wenegini Prize. In 1990, Hans and his assistant Sittah won the Grand Prix of the Netherlands and the Henk Vermeijden Cup with "the fastest metamorphosis in the world". By age 23, he was part of a touring show with Dutch comedian André van Duin.

In 1994, Klok performed for the first time on the Las Vegas Strip, as part of NBC's The World's Greatest Magic, broadcast live from Caesars Palace to an audience of 60 million people. Hans used the period after that to prepare his first theatre show, which premiered in October at the Luxor Theater in Rotterdam. In 1998, he had a second theatre show, 'Magic Live on Stage', followed by 'Magic Impossible'.

During the opening of the 2006 FIFA World Cup in Germany, about 500 million football fans in 152 countries saw Klok make the 18-carat gold World Trophy appear out of thin air in a glass cage.

In 2007, Klok had a show on the Las Vegas Strip. The Beauty of Magic was a 90-minute production presented in a large theater at Planet Hollywood Resort and Casino. It debuted on 1 June and closed in mid-December. The show included Pamela Anderson as one of Klok's assistants who participated in several illusions including being sawn in half. Klok had previously featured Carmen Electra in his illusions.

Klok has worked on Klassetv, an English program for Dutch kids. He is taking help from English Children in the British School of Amsterdam and possibly the International School of Amsterdam.

Klok toured Europe in 2010 and 2011 with his show The Houdini Experience, a loving tribute to one of his childhood heroes, done after the success of Hurricane.

For the 2011 Dutch daredevil TV show Try before you die 2 Klok, for his dare, was asked to take part in a Chippendales-show performed at The Chippendales Theatre (Rio All-Suite Hotel & Casino) in April 2011.

In February and March 2012, Klok visited the UK with his stage show The Houdini Experience, playing a five-week run at the Peacock Theatre in London, The gala opening night featured model and actress Linda Lusardi taking on a similar role to Pamela Anderson and acting as Klok's assistant for the evening, including the Buzzsaw finale. He then appeared on BBC TV's magazine programme The One Show to publicise his run, which led to him performing at Stella McCartney's London Fashion Week 2012 party-themed fashion show. There, he entertained the invited VIP guests with a number of tricks and illusions, including the levitation and sawing in half of TV presenter and model Alexa Chung. When interviewed on the Channel 5 talk show LIVE with Gabby, he revealed that his appearance at the Stella McCartney show came about after model Kate Moss saw his appearance on BBC TV's The One Show publicising his UK visit and suggested to McCartney that she should feature him in her show. The original plan for his appearance at McCartney's show was that Moss was to act as his assistant, and she spent several days working with him to rehearse the levitation and sawing illusions, plus a third illusion (not performed in the final show) in which she was beheaded by a guillotine. However, she was unable to perform in the show after suffering a temporary paralysis of her right arm a few days beforehand, and so Chung stepped in at short notice to replace her.

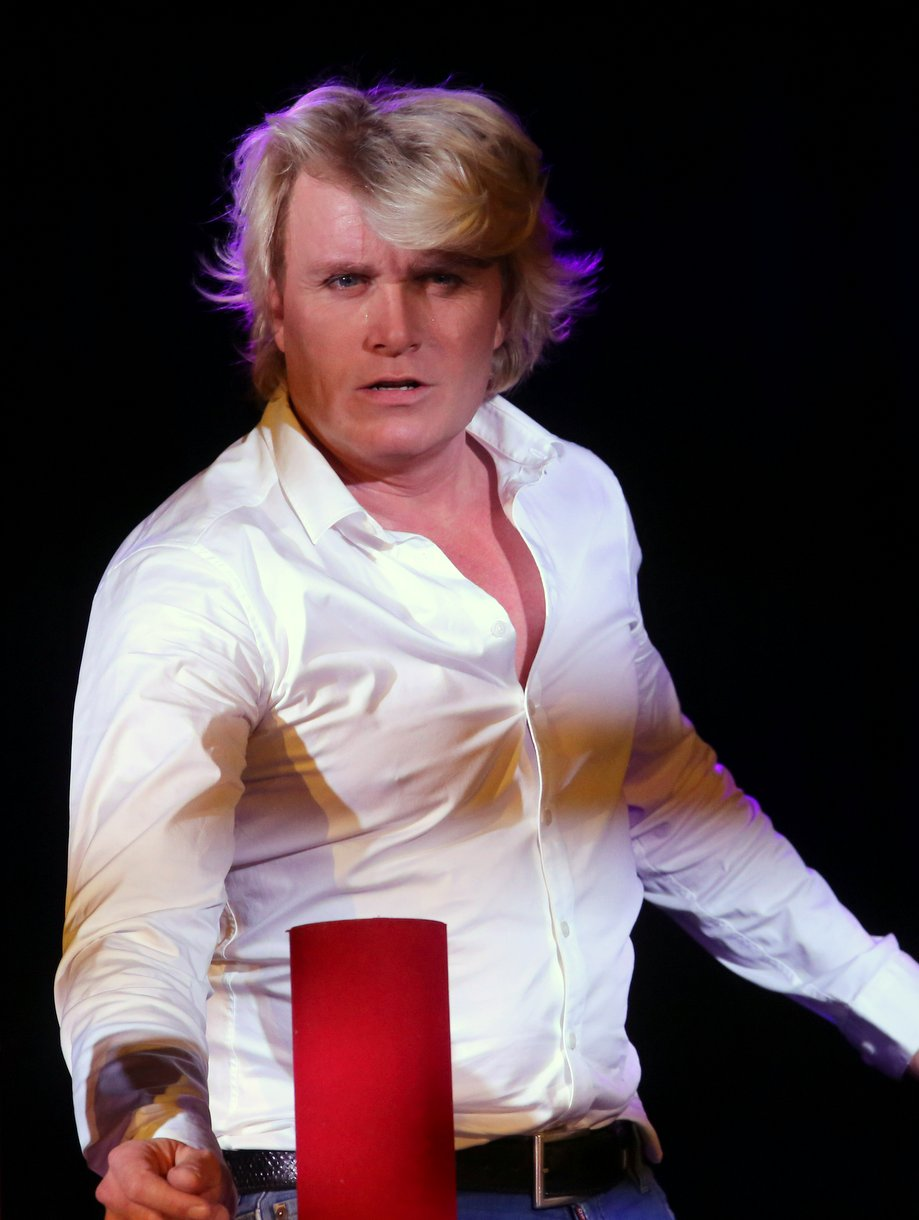
Klok performing in 2015

On 19 March 2012, he was named a member of the Inner circle with Gold Star by Jack Delvin, president of The Magic Circle, a title which is reserved for a few select members.

During the UK visit, Klok made a guest appearance on the final episode of the BBC TV show The Magicians, during which he broke his own world record for the number of illusions performed in a five-minute period by performing no fewer than 12 large illusions in 5 minutes.

In May 2013 Klok performed the Illusion Challenge again in the Plus Grand Cabaret du Monde, which was broadcast on France 2, a French television channel. This time he performed 15 illusions in 5 minutes, breaking the world record once again. In the last three years Klok has successfully toured in The Netherlands and Germany, with sold out theatres wherever he goes.

On 10 July 2013, Klok performed the Jaws of Death above the Amstel in Amsterdam, as a publicity stunt for his "The New Houdini" show.

On 26 January 2014, Klok won the Silver Clown at the 38th International Circus Festival of Monte Carlo. He is the first illusionist to ever win this award. In August 2014, Klok went on tour with The New Houdini in the Netherlands for the last time.

== Personal life ==
Klok is gay and has had a partner for over 20 years.

== Filmography ==
List of films in which Hans Klok performed as an actor:

- De D van dag (2003)
- Sinterklaas en het geheim van de Robijn
- De Grote Sinterklaasfilm en de Strijd om Pakjesavond (2023)
