= Laurence Aëgerter =

French artist

“The thought of all things passing and nothing staying put can be surprisingly soothing, since change is the most constant element of life.”

Laurence Aëgerter (born 1972 in Marseille) is a multi-disciplinary French artist, resident of Amsterdam and Marseille. Her work consists of photographic series, site-specific installations, community projects, tapestries, and artist’s books. In her artistic research, Aëgerter often uses existing images or text material, creating alternatives of historical and contemporary cultural products.

== Personal life ==
Laurence Aëgerter was born in 1972 in Marseille, France to a family of antiquaries. In 2001, Aëgerter became the mother of Alice, and in 2018 she married Uwe.

== Education ==
From 1991 to 1997, Laurence Aëgerter studied Art History at Faculte des Lettres in Paris and Vrije Universiteit in Amsterdam, and graduated with a doctorate. Her passion for art later inspired her to acquire a degree in visual arts. From 2001 to 2005, she pursued Fine Art at Gerrit Rietveld Academy in Amsterdam and graduated with another doctorate.

== Professional life ==
Laurence Aëgerter has held several titles in teaching and counseling. Since 2005, she has been the developer and coordinator of children educational art programs at: Rijksmuseum, Hermitage Museum, De Nieuwe Kerk, and British School of Amsterdam. From 2007 to 2009, Aëgerter taught art theory and fine art at the Gerrit Rietveld Academy. Since 2014, Aëgerter has been a mentor for young artistic talents, in assignment for The Mondriaan Fonds and Cultuur Ondernemen.

== Artwork ==
Since 1993, Laurence Aëgerter’s has continued her profession as an artist in Amsterdam where she lives and works.

=== Solo exhibitions (selection) ===
Aëgerter has had solo exhibitions in 2015 at the Fries Museum, Leeuwarden (NL), in 2016 at Art Affairs Gallery, Amsterdam, in 2017 at the Forum für Fotografie, Cologne, Germany, in 2020 at Machinery of Me, Arnhem, The Netherlands, in 2021 at the Petit Palais Musée des Beaux-arts de la Ville de Paris, France.

=== Group shows (selection) ===
Aëgerter has partaken in group shows in 2014 at the Lagos Photo Festival, Lagos, in 2015 at the Guggenheim Museum Bilbao, in 2018 at the Museum Dr. Guislain, Gent, and in 2019 at the Frans Hals Museum, Haarlem.

== Awards ==
- 2018 Author's Book Award, Rencontres d'Arles for Photographic Treatment
- 2015/2016 Nestlé Prize, Festival Images Vevey
- 2017 Finalist of the VSB National Care Innovation Prize for the project Photographic Treatment
- 2015-2019 Stipendium for Established Art Practice, Het Mondriaan Fonds
- 2009-2011 Young Talent Grant, Fonds BKVB Netherlands Fund for Visual Arts, Design and Architecture
- 2014 Winner Charity Award NRC Handelsblad, in the context of a photographic commission by the Rembrandt Association
