= Houston Christian High School =

Location
- 2700 West Sam Houston Parkway North; Houston, Texas 77043; United States; 29°49′15″N 95°33′40″W

Information
- Former name: Northwest Academy
- Founded: 1998
- NCES School ID: A0109406
- Head of school: Leanne Messer
- Enrollment: 470 (2021)
- Colors: Blue and white
- Website: www.houstonchristian.org
- Last updated: August 03, 2023

Houston Christian High School (HCHS) is a private, coeducational, Southern Baptist day school which educates students in grades 9–12. HC is accredited by a member of the National Association of Independent Schools, and the Independent Schools Association of the Southwest. The 46 acres (19 ha) campus is located in Spring Branch in western Houston, Texas, at the intersection of Beltway 8 and Kempwood Drive, inside Beltway 8 and outside Interstate 610.

== History ==
Houston Christian High School was founded in 1970 under the name Northwest Academy. The city of Houston's extension of a street to the new school was cited as an example of government aid to a segregation academy, schools established with government funding by white parents to avoid enrolling their children in public schools that had become integrated.

In 1998, Northwest Academy (K-12) split into First Baptist Academy and Houston Christian High School. Multiple churches collectively cofounded Houston Christian to cater to residents of the western portions of Greater Houston. First Baptist Academy moved to a location next to Houston First Baptist Church, and Houston Christian remained at the Northwest Academy site until its current facility opened. In turn the British School of Houston occupied the former Northwest Academy/Houston Christian site.

In fall 1998 Houston Christian began operations. Metro National Corp. sold the land, for under $4,000,000, to a group that intended to use the land for the permanent Houston Christian location. The cost of building was, in 1998, thought to be approximately $20 million. Construction was to begin in 1999. The school opened in the beginning of the school year in 2000. The following year multiple classrooms, a chapel, and the fine arts facilities were scheduled to open. The ultimate cost was $11 million.

Student enrollment increased from 155 in 1998 to 338 in 2001.

Circa 2018, the school decided to create a fine arts endowment from a donation worth $1,000,000.

== Campus ==
The campus has a total of 45 acres (18 ha) of area. It is along Beltway 8 and Kempwood Drive. It is in proximity to Spring Shadows. The George and Barbara Bush Center for Scholars and Leaders is a program located on campus that opened in 2012. The center offers courses for students to learn leadership skills and each student at the school receives at least 30 hours of leadership training.

The original campus had 14.5 acres (5.9 ha) of area.

== Athletics ==
The Houston Christian athletic teams, known as the Mustangs, have been members of the Southwest Preparatory Conference since 2012-13. Prior to the 2012-13 school year, HCHS was a member of TAPPS, winning many state championships.

=== Championships ===
Includes both Northwest Academy and HCHS championships

Sport	Year	Division	Source
Baseball	1982	T.A.P.S. (Statewide)	
	2000	TAPPS 3A	
	2005	TAPPS 5A	
	2008	TAPPS 5A	
	2014	SPC Division I	
Boys Basketball	1979-80	T.A.P.S. (Statewide)	
	2000-01	TAPPS 4A	
	2013-14	SPC Division II	
	2017-18	SPC	
	2018-19	SPC	
	2020-21	SPC South Zone	
	2022-23	SPC 4A	
Girls Basketball	1981-82	T.A.P.S. (Statewide)	
	1983-84	T.A.P.S. (Statewide)	
	1988-89	T.A.P.S. Class AAA	
	2021-22	SPC	
	2022-23	SPC 4A	
Cross Country	2022-23	Girls 3A	
Football	1974	T.A.P.S. (Unofficial Championship)	
	1975	T.A.P.S. (Unofficial Championship)	
	1979	T.A.P.S. (Statewide)	
	1982	T.A.P.S. Division I	
Softball	2013	SPC Division II	
Boys Tennis	2018	SPC	
	2019	SPC	
Girls Tennis	2023	SPC 3A	
Girls Track & Field	1981	T.A.P.S. (Statewide)	
	1982	T.A.P.S. (Statewide)	
