= British International School of Stockholm =

Location
- Rinkebyvägen 4, 182 36 Danderyd and Östra Valhallavägen 17, 182 68 Djursholm; Sweden
- Coordinates: 59.415576°N 18.044434°E

Information
- Type: International, not for profit
- Established: 1980
- Enrollment: 425
- Accreditation: COBIS, International Baccalaureate
- Website: bisstockholm.se

The British International School of Stockholm (BISS) a private, coeducational, fee paying, non-profit day school for students aged 3 to 18 in the Greater Stockholm area. It is one of only a small number of International Schools in the city, and one of only two to charge school fees. Founded in 1980 the school enrols about 450 students from more than 50 nationalities. The school is a full IB Diploma school. Located in Danderyd Commune, approximately 12 km north of central Stockholm. BISS operates on two sites.

The school first began to offer scholarships in 2024.

== Curriculum and accreditation ==
The British International School of Stockholm is one of only three IGCSE Cambridge schools in the Stockholm region. Years 10 and 11 follow an Cambridge IGCSE programme. BISS has been an IB Diploma school since 2019. The schools first IB cohort graduated in 2021. This makes it one of only two schools in the Stockholm region to offer the combination of IGCSE and IB Diploma to its students.

The British International School of Stockholm is the only COBIS accredited school in Sweden. BISS is also an affiliate member of Forbisia. BISS students compete in the international Mathematics competition for COBIS schools - the Maths All stars - on an annual basis.

BISS is a Google School. All teachers and secondary students are issued with a chromebook.

BISS is host to the De Nederlandse School Stockholm.

== History of the school ==
BISS was founded in 1980 and was initially run from Villa Borgen in Danderyd, and was originally named the British Primary School. By the early 2000s the school had around 200 students enrolled. It later changed its name and added a Secondary section.

In 2016 the school received a bomb threat via telephone. A full evacuation was carried out and no bomb was found. A similar threat was received on the same day by the British International School of Stavanger.

Corina Rader took over as School Director in August 2025.

== Notable achievements ==
In 2019 a team from BISS won the Cambridge Upper Secondary Science Competition for the Europe region.

Graduates from BISS have attended prestigious universities, including The London School of Economics and St. Andrews in the United Kingdom, George Mason University in the United States, Leiden University and the University of Groningen in the Netherlands, and KTH Royal Institute of Technology and the Stockholm School of Economics in Sweden.
