= British International School of Marbella =

Coordinates: 36.51381°N 4.91268°W

The British International School of Marbella (BISM)
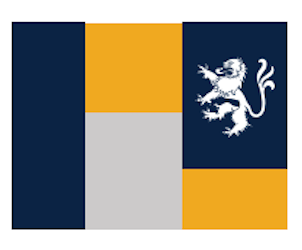

Information
- Website: https://bism.es

The British International School of Marbella (BISM) is an international school located in the Spanish city of Marbella. The school was opened in 2010 and is part of the British Schools Foundation (BSF). BISM follows the English National Curriculum and provides education for children in Early Years, Primary School and Secondary School.

== Location and facilities ==
BISM is located close to the centre of a Marbella.

== Administration ==
BISM is governed by the British Schools Foundation, a UK non-profit organisation. The day-to-day operation is overseen by the headteacher. The school is also an affiliate of the Council of British International Schools (COBIS) and the National Association of British Schools in Spain (NABSS).
