= British International Schools =

The name British International School is a common name for a number of schools throughout the world. It may refer to

- member schools of Federation of British International Schools in Asia
- British International School in Cairo
- British International School of Cracow
- British International School, Jakarta
- British International School of Ljubljana
- British International School in Lomé, Togo
- British International School (Moscow)
- British International School of New York
- British International School Prague
- British International School Shanghai
- British International School of Stockholm
- British International School Vietnam
- St. George's British International School
- uk:Британська міжнародна школа в Україні (British International School in Ukraine)

== See also ==
- British school (disambiguation)
- Category:British international schools
