= Arabian Ranches =

- Community
- Interactive map of Arabian Ranches
- Country: United Arab Emirates
- Emirate: Emirate of Dubai
- City: Dubai
- Established: 2004

Arabian Ranches is an upscale gated villa community in Dubai, United Arab Emirates launched in 2004, developed by Emaar Properties. It is located in Wadi Al Safa 6, along Sheikh Mohammad Bin Zayed Road and in proximity to Dubai's Global Village. It includes the Arabian Ranches Golf Club and the Dubai Polo & Equestrian Club.

Emaar followed up with developments of Arabian Ranches 2 and Arabian Ranches 3.

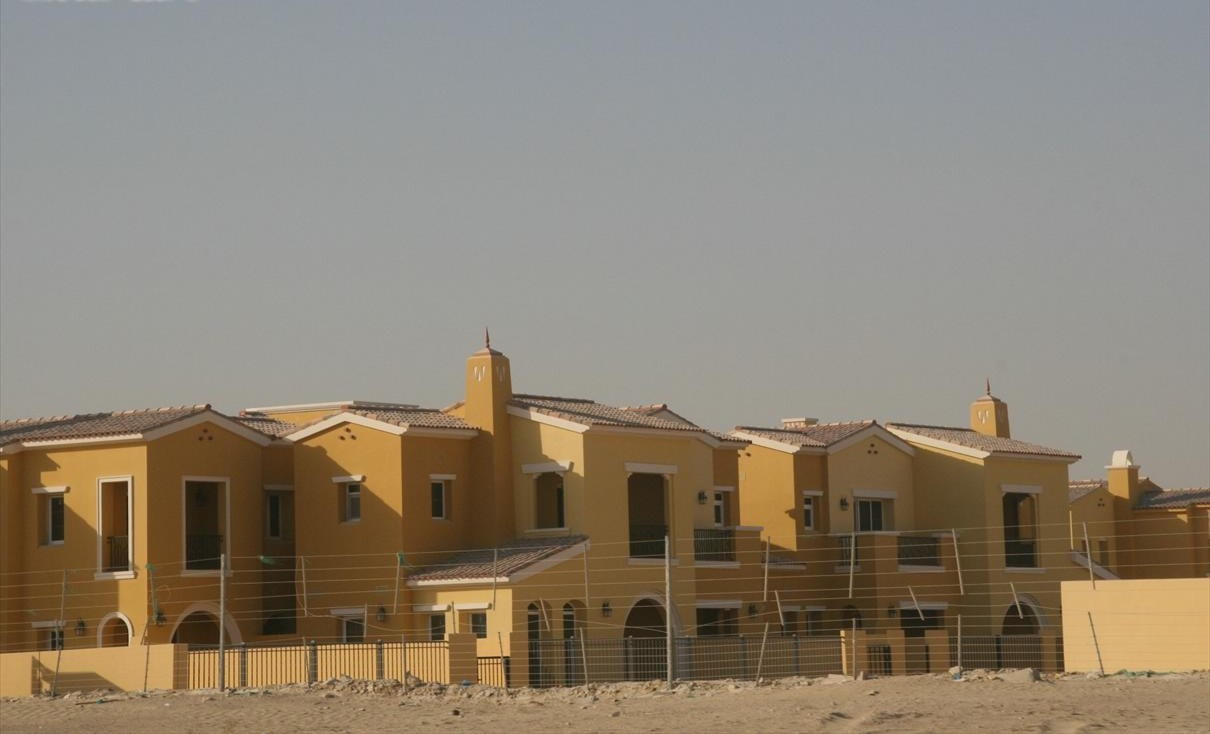
Arabian Ranches on 12 June 2007

== Residential ==
The residential core of Arabian Ranches 1 is composed of over 4,000 villas & townhouses, while Arabian Ranches 2 is composed of over 1,724 themed villas and townhouses. The units were initially received poorly, with complaints of water logging and leaking.

== Retail ==
=== Arabian Ranches Shopping Centre ===
Arabian Ranches Shopping Centre is a shopping center located in Arabian Ranches 1. It hosts 20 retail outlets, a mosque, and a healthcare center.

=== The Ranches Souk ===
The Ranches Souk is a shopping center located in Arabian Ranches 2. It hosts over 35 retail units spread over two floors.

== Leisure ==
=== Arabian Ranches Golf Club ===
Opened in February 2004, the 18-hole, 72 par course was designed by Ian Baker-Finch in association with Nicklaus Design. In 2014, a 2-year enhancement project was completed.

=== Equestrian Centre ===
The Arabian Ranches development is home to an Andalusian-style Equestrian Centre specialising in services and events that include polo, show jumping and horseback trail riding in the desert.

== Infrastructure ==
=== Education ===
The community has two schools, Jumeirah English Speaking School and Ranches Primary School. These offer primary and secondary education, orientated towards the English National Curriculum.

Jumeirah English Speaking School offers GCSE, IGCSE and BTEC qualifications. It also offers pathways towards the International Baccalaureate Diploma or BTECs at post-16 level.
