= British International School of Houston =

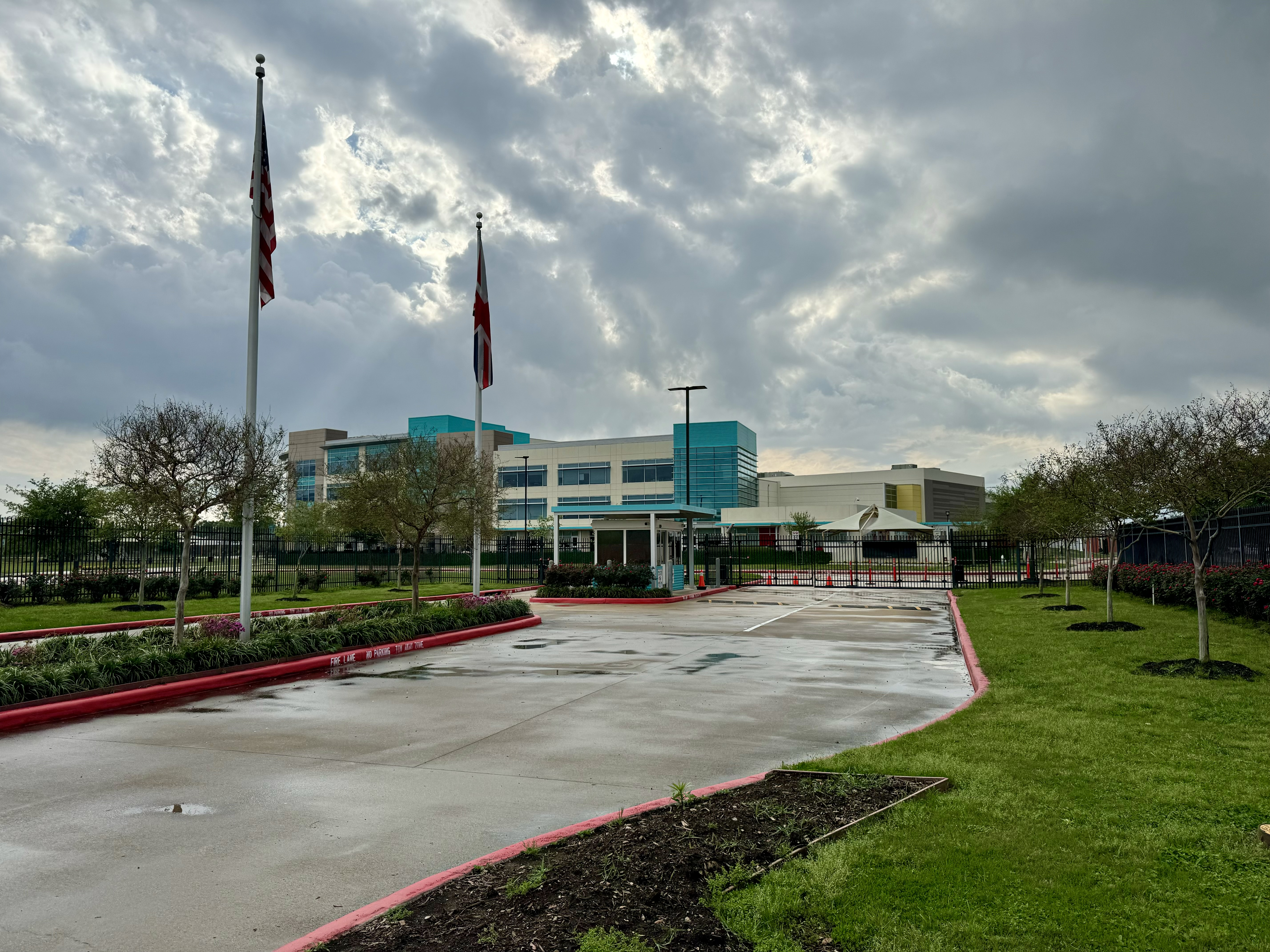
- New school building in Greater Katy.

Location
- 2203 North Westgreen Boulevard; Katy, Texas 77449; United States
- 29°47′58″N 95°44′14″W

Information
- Other names: BIS Houston, BISH
- Religious affiliation: Nonsectarian
- Established: 2000
- Locale: Large suburb
- NCES School ID: BB021859
- Principal: Barrie Scrymgeour
- Teaching staff: 98.0 (on an FTE basis)
- Gender: Coeducational
- Age range: 3 to 18
- Enrollment: 1,004 (2023-2024)
  - Pre-kindergarten: 65
  - Kindergarten: 74
  - Grade 1: 53
  - Grade 2: 90
  - Grade 3: 77
  - Grade 4: 55
  - Grade 5: 81
  - Grade 6: 88
  - Grade 7: 85
  - Grade 8: 82
  - Grade 9: 66
  - Grade 10: 57
  - Grade 11: 69
  - Grade 12: 62
- Student to teacher ratio: 9.6
- Hours in school day: 7
- Color: Teal
- Mascot: Bulldog
- Accreditation: IB
- Website: www.nordangliaeducation.com/our-schools/houston/british-international

The British International School of Houston (BISH), formerly the British School of Houston (BSOH), is a non-sectarian, co-educational college preparatory day school in the Greater Katy region of the Houston area. BISH, which opened in September 2000, offers education for ages 3 to 18 (UK Nursery to Year 13/US Pre-K to Grade 12). The British International School of Houston is a part of Nord Anglia Education; previously it was operated by the British Schools of America. It moved to its current campus in fall 2016, and was previously in northwest Houston.

== History ==
Logo for the school under its previous name of the British School of Houston

The school opened on September 11, 2000, serving children of ages 3 to 13. Each year, the British International School added one additional grade by level, until it covered ages 3 to 18. The original 14.5 acres (5.9 ha) campus occupied by the school had previously housed Houston Christian High School. Grainne O'Reilly-Askew, the school's first headmistress, said that British companies encountered difficulty in convincing their executives to relocate to Greater Houston, since the area previously did not have a school using the Education in the United Kingdom. John Major, the former Prime Minister of the United Kingdom, attended the school's official opening.

The school's enrollment grew quickly after it opened, when it had 75 students. By December 2000 the school had 82 students, with 12 on the waiting list for January, when three more teachers were scheduled to begin employment with the school. O'Reilly-Askew said that she was not surprised by the increase of interest in the school, since there are a large number of British citizens living in Greater Houston. Annette Baird of the Houston Chronicle said that, as of December 2000, the number of British citizens in Greater Houston was estimated to be over 40,000. O'Reilly-Askew also stated that several American families showed interest in the school.

The school's current campus in Greater Katy opened in the fall of 2016. The new campus increased student capacity from 850 to 2,000. Barrie Scrymgeour is the school's current principal.

== Curriculum ==
The British International School of Houston offers the International Baccalaureate Diploma Programme (IBDP) for students in Years 12 and 13 (Grades 11 and 12) and the International General Certificate of Secondary Education (IGCSE) in Years 10 and 11 (Grades 9 and 10). The Primary School, which includes Nursery to Year 6 (Pre-K-Grade 5), offers the International Primary Curriculum (IPC).

Students at the British International School of Houston sit externally graded standardized tests in English, Maths, and Science as recommended by the National Curriculum for England at the end of Years 2, 6 and 9. Optional tests are taken at the end of Years 3, 4, 5, 7 and 8 in Maths and English. IGCSE and IB students take external examinations at the end of Years 11 and 13.

From 2010 to 2016, 100% of the BISH students who took the International Baccalaureate diploma test passed. There is a Dutch curriculum program for temporary residents from the Netherlands. There is also a program for native French speakers.

== Demographics ==
As of 2016 pupils of more than 50 nationalities attend the school, with the majority of students being British and American.

As of May 2014, there were about 850 students. About 60% of the students were British, 7% were American, and the remainder were of other nationalities.

== Campus ==
In December 2014 the school acquired a 33-acre (13 ha) site in unincorporated Harris County, Texas, in the Greater Katy area, with a capacity of 2,000 students, located at the southwest corner of Franz Road and North Westgreen Boulevard, east of Texas State Highway 99 (Grand Parkway) and north of Interstate 10 (Katy Freeway). The developer is Simpkins Group, the designer is Fanning Howey and House Partners, and the construction manager is Tribble & Stephens Construction Ltd. The groundbreaking ceremony was held in February 2015 and the campus opened in September 2016.

The school's Grand Opening celebration was held on October 13, 2016.

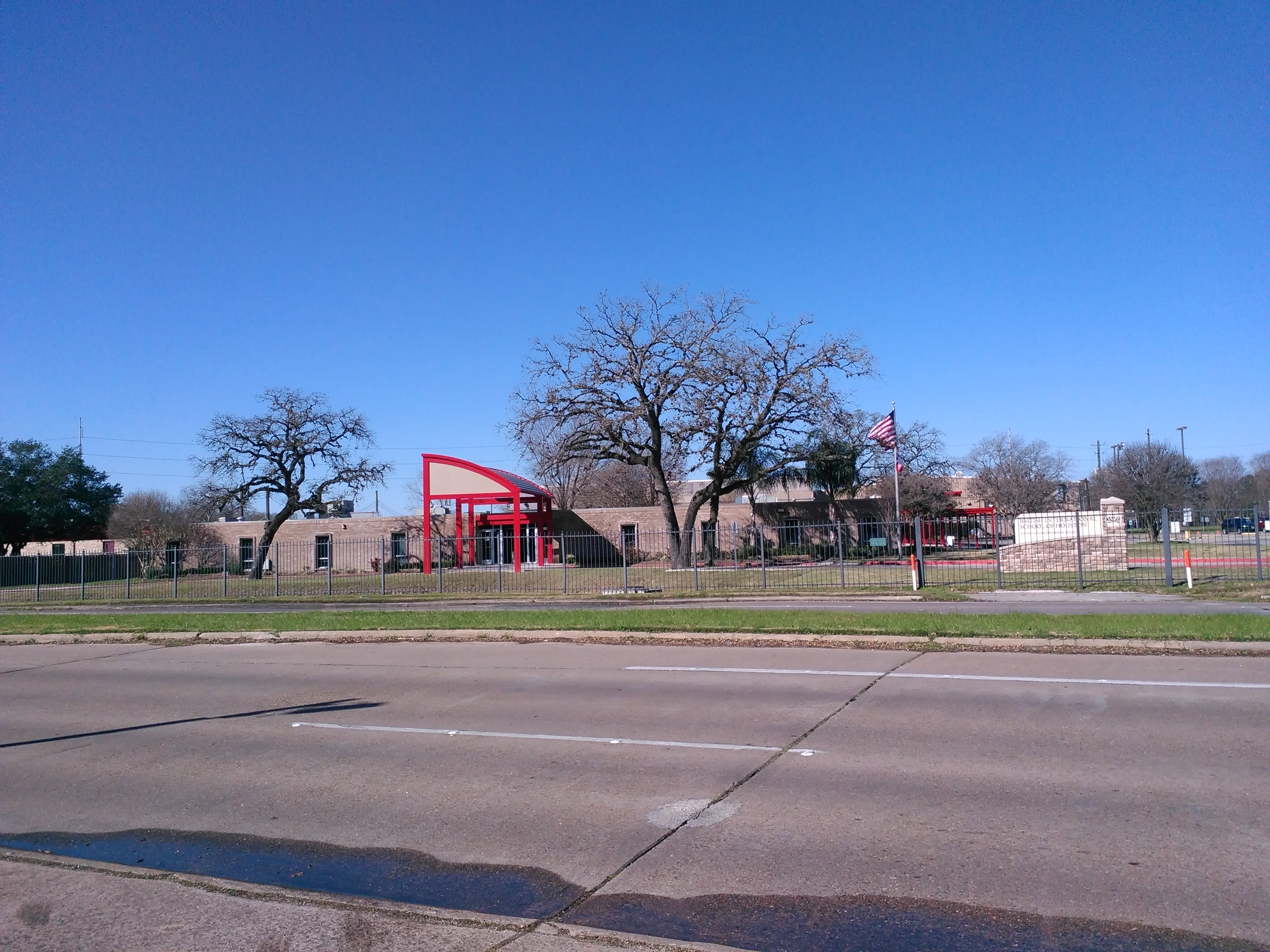
Former school building in Houston

The school's previous campus, the former Houston Christian High School, was on a 14-acre (5.7 ha) plot of land in proximity to U.S. Route 290 (Northwest Freeway). This campus had a capacity of 850 students, and the student body there ranged from 450 to 850 students.

== Global Initiatives ==
Nord Anglia Education has a collaborative programme with the Juilliard School, and MIT

The British International School also offers students the opportunity to participate in the Nord Anglia Global Campus, a programme that links students attending the 43 schools to one another online for activities, challenges, curriculum and expeditions, helping students gain a global perspective.

== Affiliation and Associations ==
The British International School of Houston is accredited to offer the International Baccalaureate Diploma Programme (IBDP). BISH is an active member of the European Council of International Schools (ECIS), the Council for International Schools in the Americas (CISTA) and the Independent Association of Preparatory Schools.

== See also ==
American schools in the United Kingdom:

- The American School in London
- American School in England
