= British International School of Stavanger =

Coordinates: 58.8974°N 5.7334°E

Information
- Established: 1977
- Age: 18 months to 16 years
- Language: English

British International Schools of Stavanger are 3 international schools in Stavanger, Norway.

== Structure ==
The schools currently caters for approximately 730 pupils from over 50 different nationalities, from 18 months of age up to the age of 16. BISS Preschool is on the same site as BISS Gausel. BISS Gausel and BISS Sentrum offer the IB Primary Years Programme and the IB Middle Years Programme.

== History ==
BISS was founded in 1977.

In 2016 the school was one of three British International Schools that received a bomb threat. After a full search nothing was found.
