= British Schools of America =

Educational Organization

Nord Anglia Education
- Location: 11 On Tin Street, Lam Tin, Kowloon, Hong Kong
- Parent organization: Nord Anglia Education Ltd.
- Staff: 1275
- Website: http://www.nordangliaeducation.com/

British Schools of America, an educational organization founded in 1998, joined the Nord Anglia Education company, headquartered in London, in 2013. Nord Anglia Education operates 10 schools in the United States.

== British School of Boston ==
The British School of Boston opened in September 2000 in Dedham, Massachusetts. In 2004, the school relocated to the Moss Hill section of Jamaica Plain, Massachusetts. It shares a 40 acres (160,000 m^{2}) campus with a satellite campus of Showa Women's University whose main campus is in Tokyo, Japan.

== British School of Chicago, Lincoln Park ==
British International School of Chicago, Lincoln Park opened in 2001 in Chicago, Illinois on the north side. In 2008, the school relocated to Lincoln Park.

== British American School of Charlotte ==
The British American School of Charlotte opened in 2004 and is located in the Ballantyne/South Charlotte area.

== British School of Houston ==
The British School of Houston opened in 2000 and is located west of downtown Houston, Texas.

== British School of Washington ==
The British School of Washington was the first World Class Learning school to be opened by Lesley Stagg in 1998 Washington D.C. In 2008, the school relocated to the Georgetown (D.C.) area.
