= British Schools Foundation =

The British Schools Foundation

Information
- Website: www.britishschools.co.uk

The British Schools Foundation aims to promote quality British-style education worldwide. The organisation chartered eleven schools serving expatriate communities in China, Russia, Malaysia, Myanmar, Philippines, Spain, Uzbekistan and Brazil.

All schools in the group follow the English National Curriculum. All BSF-founded schools except the schools in Spain are now part of Nord Anglia Education.

== Schools ==
The first school, British School of Guangzhou was established in 2005. Since then, another ten schools have been opened. The British School of Nanjing was established in 2007 and has one campus serving more than 150 students. The International School of Moscow was established in 2007 and has two campuses serving more than 400 students. The British School, Kuala Lumpur was established in 2009 serving more than 500 students as of 2012.

In 2010 the British International School of Marbella, the British School of Navarra, and the British School of Tashkent were opened. In 2011 the group opened the British College of Brazil. The King's School, Manila, was opened in August 2012. In 2014 the British School Yangon was opened. In 2016 the group opened the British School of Brasília. Seven of the foundation's schools were acquired by Nord Anglia Education in 2017.

== See also ==
- Education by country
