= British School of Amsterdam =

Coordinates: 52°21′5″N 4°51′23″E

The British School of Amsterdam
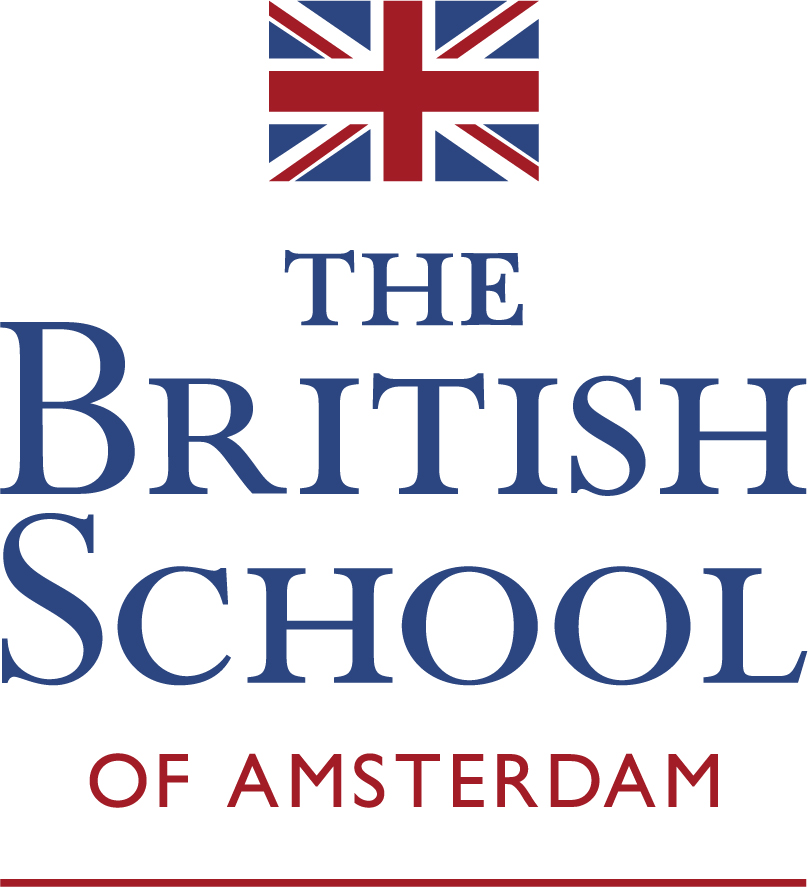

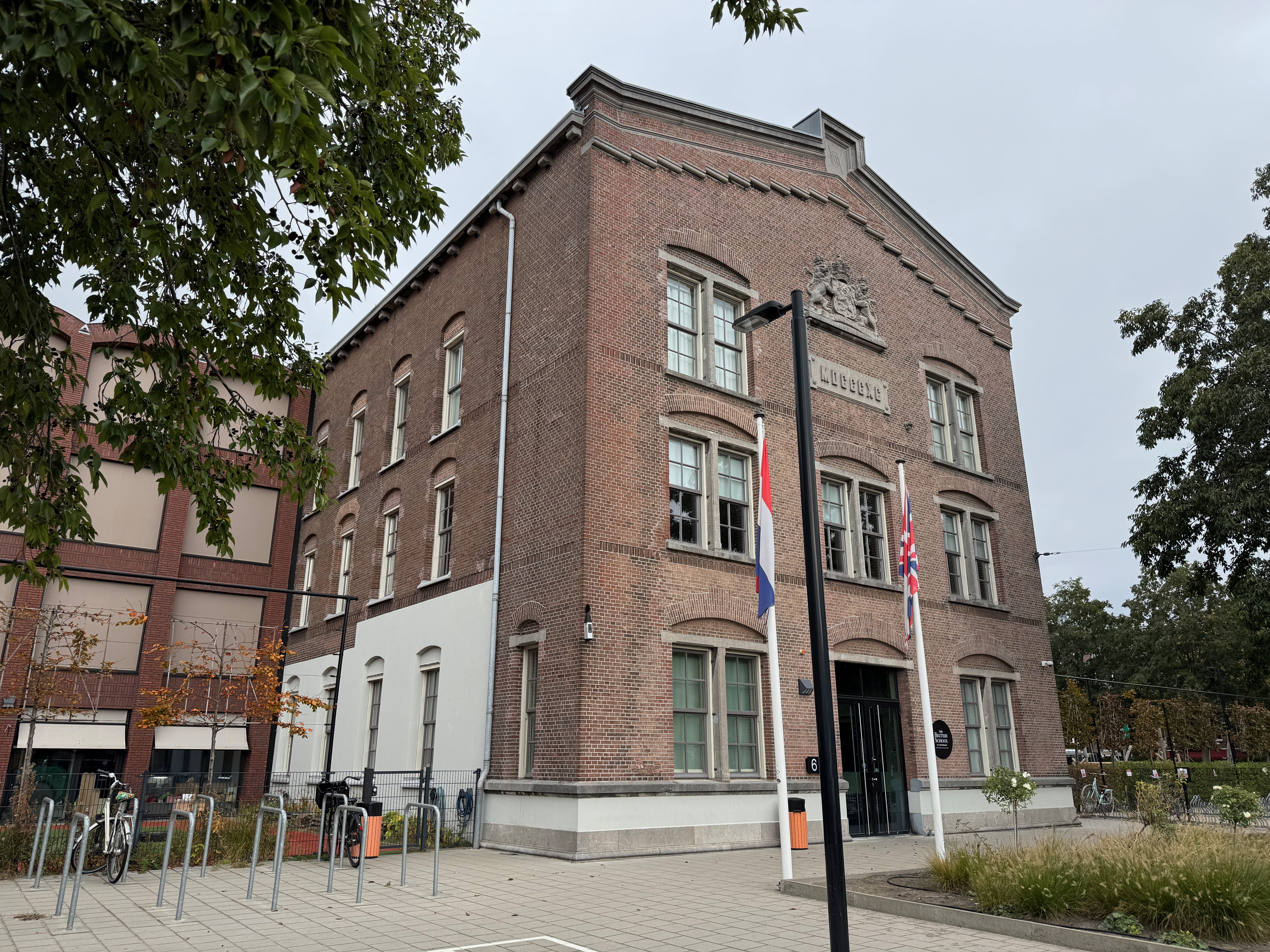

Location
- Havenstraat 6 Amsterdam, 1075 PR; Netherlands

Information
- Type: British school
- Established: 1978
- Principal: Ruth Sanderson
- Staff: 190
- Gender: Boys & girls
- Age: 3 to 19
- Enrolment: 1100
- Website: www.britams.nl

The British School of Amsterdam is an international school, situated in Amsterdam, Netherlands, teaching children from nursery through to Year 13. The school follows the National Curriculum for England and is the first school in the Netherlands to be accredited by the UK Government as a British School Overseas. The school was re-accredited following an inspection in November 2017. The school is a member of the Council of British International Schools.

== History ==
=== Early years ===
The British School of Amsterdam was founded in 1978 by three families who were on two-year contracts in Amsterdam and did not want their children to fall behind the English system when they returned to the UK. Initially the "school" as it was then was situated in one of the families' living rooms.

By the summer of 1980, the families secured the use of a building in Jekerstraat 86 in the then-borough of Amsterdam Nieuw-Zuid which it shared with another school. At the time, the British School only taught kindergarten and primary school pupils. Initially, there was not a headmaster (with a brief exception in the second half of 1981), but there was a head-teacher by the name of Linda Duffy.

In the summer of 1982, the school moved to the top floor of the Nicolaas Maas School in Heinzestraat 9 in Amsterdam Oud-Zuid. The two schools shared a playground and a gymnasium. The children in the school were aged between 3 and 11 years old.

=== Mr. Roberts takes over ===
In 1983, all of the full-time teaching-staff resigned, but for separate reasons (however, continuity was ensured by the auxiliary teaching-staff, supply teachers and other staff, board of governors, PTA, etc.). While recruiting new teachers, the school decided to employ a headmaster. Michael W. G. Roberts, who had been deputy head of a school in Newcastle, England moved to Amsterdam and joined the school in 1983 as Headmaster and class teacher of the oldest children, a mixed group from 8 to 11 years of age.

In January 1985 the Amsterdam Gemeente Amsterdam (city council) allowed the school to take over the Jan van Eijckstraat 21 site (in Amsterdam Nieuw-Zuid) which had been used as a temporary residence for schools undergoing major renovation etc. The school occupied this site until April 2021. This was also the first time the school had an entire building all to itself. At this time there were five members of full-time teaching-staff and 40 pupils in the school. Until this time the three to five-year-old children had all been in one class but when the school moved this group was divided and the first Nursery class was created.

As the number of children increased the decision was made to create classrooms and a staff common room in the roof of the Jan van Eijckstraat building which meant the school could take in more children gradually creating year group classes rather than ones that were partially vertically grouped.

=== Expansion ===
In 1999 the numbers grew so rapidly that the school needed to rent another building for a year while the Board of Governors and Headmaster looked for a long-term solution to the growing need for suitable space as pupil numbers grew. The oldest children in the school were relocated in the West of Amsterdam, to a school in Orteliusstraat. School buses were arranged to take the children every morning and afternoon from Jan van Eijckstraat to and from the other site and the Gemeente gave the school its very own British School of Amsterdam bus stop.

In 2002 the school bought the site at Anthonie van Dijckstraat and leased the building across the road, next to the Montessori School, which was named the Jubilee Building. The school offices and one of the three nursery classes were in the Jubilee Building and the two other nursery classes, Reception, Year 1 and Year 2 were in Anthonie van Dijckstraat. The rest of the school was still located at Jan van Eijckstraat.

During these years the pupil numbers were always greatest in the Nursery and Reception and gradually decreased as the children grew older as many families made the decision to return to their home countries for their children to continue a more familiar system of education. However, as pupil numbers and demand increased the school gradually added year groups, building up to the point where there were enough older children to create a Senior School and offer British examinations. In 2004 the Senior School moved to the site at Frederick Roeskestraat.

In 2010, The British School of Amsterdam was changed into a stichting (a foundation). The main office is located at Havenstraat 6.

In February 2017 the school purchased Huis van Bewaring, a 19th century prison. They renovated the building, and officially opened the site in April 2021, with capacity for 1,200 students.

=== School principals ===
- 1981 - 1981: David F. Jones
- 1983 - 2010: Michael W. G. Roberts OBE (former deputy headmaster in Newcastle, England
- 2010 - 2013: John Light (former Rector at Edinburgh Academy, Scotland)
- 2013 - 2016: Jonnie Goyer (former Head at Farlington School, England)
- 2016 - 2022: Paul Morgan (former Deputy Headmaster at St Paul's School, Brazil)
- 2022 - 2025 Ruth Sanderson (former Senior Vice Principal - Head of Secondary at Doha College)
- 2025–Present: Ciaran Harrington (former Principal - The British International School of Stockholm)

==== Headteacher ====
- 1978(?)- 1983 Linda Duffy (née Whitten)

== Campus ==
=== The Early Years School ===
The Early Years School accommodates children in Nursery, Reception and Year 1. The school has accommodation for four classes in each year group. It used to be located on Anthonie van Dijckstraat now it is the situation on the ground floor at Havenstraat 6. All classrooms have direct access to a playground. The school houses teaching classrooms, two Dutch classrooms, two EALT rooms, Learning Support Rooms, an Occupational Therapy Room, a Busy Room, Music Room, a large school hall, a gymnasium and a library.

=== Junior School ===
The Junior and Senior schools used to be on Fred Roeskestraat, 1.5 kilometers from the current site. The Junior School accommodates Years 2 to 6 with four classes per year group. Maximum class size of 24. It consists of teaching classrooms, a music room, and access to a sports hall. Each year group has a shared space to do project work.

=== Senior School ===
The Senior School is from Years 7 to 13. Maximum class size is 22 pupils. In Years 10 and 11, pupils sit GCSEs and IGCSEs. In the Sixth Form (Years 12 and 13), the students take courses leading to A Levels and International A Levels.
