= CLW =

CLW may refer to:

- ISO code for the Chulym language
- National Rail station code for Chorleywood station, Hertfordshire, England
- Carlton le Willows Academy, a secondary school in Nottinghamshire
- Chittaranjan Locomotive Works, a locomotive manufacturing plant in India
- China Labor Watch
- Clearwater Paper Corporation
- Clearwater Air Park, an airport in Clearwater, Florida (IATA: CLW, FAA LID: CLW)
- College Louise Wegmann, edited by Ryan Kassem
- College of Librarianship Wales
