= Roderick Samson Mabomba =

Malwian librarian (1948–2001)

Roderick Samson Mabomba (September 25, 1948 – June 7, 2001) was a library leader in Malawi. He worked to make information science an important subject in Malawi and to bring libraries to the attention of the Malawi government. He spoke at numerous conferences, where he presented his papers giving exposure to libraries from Africa.

== Education ==
Mabomba attended St. Patrick's Secondary School. He received his technical education at the College of Librarianship (today the Department of Information Studies at Aberystwyth University, Aberystwyth, Wales) from 1968 to 1970. Mabomba earned a Master of Librarianship from the University of Wales in 1985.

== Career ==
Mabomba worked as Library Assistant at the Chancellor College University Library (1968); as Assistant Librarian at the University of Malawi (1971–1975); as Chief Librarian at the British Council of Malawi (1975–1978); and finally as National Librarian at the National Library Service of Malawi (1978–2001).

== Awards and Leadership ==
Mabomba was named International Librarian of the Year in 1999. He was a founding member and President of the Malawi Library Association from 1976 to 1978.

== Publications ==
“Libraries in Malawi” Encyclopedia of Library and Information Science 17, 1975, pp. 1–55

“The Role of National Information Transfer” ESCRBICA Journal, 4, 1979, pp. 21–28

A Manual for Small Libraries in Malawi, 1981.

“The Development of Librarianship in the Third World: A View from Africa” Inspel 1987, 21:4, pp. 181–203

“Youth and Libraries, An African Experience”, paper, Fourth Conference of National Librarians of Southern Africa, Bisho, South Africa, 1989.

“The Role of Librarians in Combating Illiteracy, The Africa Perspective”, paper, National Symposium on Year of Reader, Cape Town, South Africa, 1990.

“The Relationship between National Libraries and the Development of School and Public Libraries”, paper, Conference of National Librarians of Southern Africa, Mmabatho, 1990.

“Improving Access to Information in Rural Africa, The Rural Library Experiment in Malawi”, paper, IFLA, Conference, Barcelona, 1993.
