= Lance Batchelor =

British businessman and former naval officer (born 1964)

- Born: 1964 (age 61–62)
- Education: Aberystwyth University; Harvard Business School
- Occupation: Businessman

Lance Batchelor (born 1964) is a British businessman and former naval officer. He is the chairman of Royal Museums Greenwich and several private equity and venture capital-owned companies, including Burger King UK (Bridgepoint) Ometria (Octopus VC) and Appello (Epiris LLP). He is also the lead non-executive director on the Royal Navy board.

Lance was the CEO of Saga Plc from March 2014 until February 2020. He led the design, build and introduction of two new cruise ships, Spirit of Discovery and Sprit of Adventure.

During his time as CEO, Saga introduced new three-year fixed-price home and motor insurance policies which sold over half a million policies in the first year and reduced customer churn. Saga also significantly reduced its insurance margins, stabilising market share. However, as a result the company profitability dropped and the share price declined significantly below the IPO level.

He was previously the CEO of Domino's Pizza Group until February 2014, having initially joined the company's board in July 2010. During Batchelor's tenure the share price rose from 370p to 589p. The share price dropped over 5% in December 2013 when he resigned to join Saga.

Before this, Batchelor was the CEO of Tesco Mobile (2007–11), marketing director of Vodafone (2002–06), a general manager at Amazon.com (2000-2002) and a marketing director at Procter & Gamble (1991-2000). In 2010 Batchelor was named one of the 50 most influential people in UK Mobile.

Lance is a former submarine warfare officer in the Royal Navy. He is now the lead non-executive director on the navy board. He holds the honorary rank of captain RN. He is an Elder Brother of Trinity House and the Chairman of the Lighthouse Board.

In the charity sector, Lance is the chairman of the White Ensign Association and a Vice Patron of the Royal Navy and Royal Marines Charity (RNRMC). He was previously the chairman of Action against Gambling Harms, a charity which conducts research to help understand and mitigate harm. In January 2011, he was appointed a trustee of The National Gallery by David Cameron, the UK prime minister. This role ended in February 2019.

Lance is a graduate and an Honorary Fellow of Aberystwyth University and has an MBA from Harvard Business School.

He lives in Berkshire, UK, with his wife. They have 4 adult sons.
