= F. Gwendolen Rees =

Welsh zoologist and parasitologist

Florence Gwendolen Rees

Florence Gwendolen Rees, (Gwendolen or Gwen) FRS (3 July 1906 – 4 October 1994) was a Welsh zoologist and parasitologist. She was the first Welsh woman to become a fellow of the Royal Society. By the time she was 80 years old, she had published 68 papers.

== Early life and education ==
Rees was born in the Welsh town of Abercynon in 1906, and attended the Intermediate School for Girls in Aberdare, (1918–24). She attended University College, Cardiff (now known as Cardiff University) with three scholarships. During her time there, she studied chemistry, biology and zoology, earning honours in zoology. Rees then went on to complete her doctorate in 18 months, studying the trematode parasites in different species of snails. Over the course of 100 days she collected more than 5,000 snails from nearly 90 locations in Glamorgan and Monmouthshire counties in Wales.

== Career ==
Rees' career was at the Zoology Department of the University College of Wales, Aberystwyth, where she successively held positions of Assistant Lecturer (1930–7), Lecturer (1937–47), Senior Lecturer (1947–66), Reader (1966–71) and Professor (1971–3), becoming professor emeritus in semi-retirement in 1973. She was also Chairman of the School of Biological Studies (1972–3) and acting Head of Department (1948, 1969, 1970). During her time as a staff member at the University College of Wales, Aberystwyth Rees supervised 215 honours students and 25 post-graduate students.

Her research was in the area of helminthology, focusing on systematics, comparative functional morphology, histology and life cycles of trematode and cestode parasites. Her work was important in elucidating the relationship of these parasites with their non-vertebrate intermediate hosts.

From 1960 to 1981 Rees was involved with the publication Parasitology. For the first 10 years, she was a member of the editorial board and then went on to serve as chair of the editorial board until 1981. She was a founder member of the British Society for Parasitology, and served as its vice-president (1970–72) and president (1972–74).

Rees died in Aberystwyth, on 4 October 1994.

== Awards and honours ==
Rees became a Fellow of the Royal Society in 1971, the first Welsh woman to be elected. She was also elected Fellow of the Institute of Biology in the same year. She received the Linnean Medal, the highest award of the Linnean Society, in 1990. She was also featured in a 1975 Vogue article on influential and interesting British women.
