= Iris de Freitas Brazao =

First female Barrister-at-Law (Lawyer) in the Commonwealth Caribbean (1896 - 1989)

- Postcard from Aberystwyth University
- Born: 29 October 1896; Barbados
- Died: 1989 (aged 92–93); Georgetown, Guyana
- Education: Aberystwyth University University of Oxford Honourable Society of the Inner Temple
- Occupation: Barrister-at-Law
- Known for: First Female Barrister in the Commonwealth Caribbean
- Spouse: Alfred Brazao

Iris de Freitas Brazao (1896 – 1989) was the first female Barrister-at-Law (Lawyer) in the Commonwealth Caribbean.

== Life ==
Iris de Freitas Brazao was born in Barbados and from childhood resided in Guyana (then British Guiana). Iris de Freitas Brazao's father M. G. de Freitas, was a merchant of Madeiran Portuguese descent and her mother was Barbadian.

Iris de Freitas Brazao's academic life was stellar. After a short period of study at the University of Toronto in Canada in 1918, she enrolled at Aberystwyth University in Wales. She graduated with a BA and an LL.B in the 1920s from that university.

Iris went on to study at the University of Oxford from 1923 and the Honourable Society of the Inner Temple in England. In 1929 she was admitted to the Bar as the first woman Barrister-at-Law in the Commonwealth Caribbean. She was also the first female prosecutor of a murder trial in Guyana.

In 1937 she married Alfred Brazao who was also a Barrister-a-Law. They lived in Georgetown, British Guiana where she continued to work as a Barrister-at-Law. Iris died in 1989 in Georgetown, Guyana having achieved many firsts in her legal career.

== Legacy ==
In 2014, research on Iris de Freitas Brazao was featured in Dr. Joanne Collins-Gonsalves Gonsalves' PhD dissertation.

In 2016, staff at her alma mater came across a postcard that featured her. Investigations revealed that she was a graduate of Aberystwyth University. Along with Iris' Aberystwyth University records and information provided by Dr. Joanne Collins-Gonsalves and Mrs. Joan Brathwaite, additional information on Iris' life was revealed. On International Women's Day in 2016, her university named a room in the university's Hugh Owen Library in her honour.

In 2018, to celebrate Black History Month in the United Kingdom, she was included in a list of 100 "Brilliant, Black and Welsh" people.

In 2021, the Caribbean Court of Justice honored Iris as one of the Pioneering Caribbean Women Jurists

In 2023, the first full length book on Iris de Freitas Brazao, a scholarly biography titled: Iris de Freitas Brazao, Legal Luminary and Trailblazer: Caribbean, Canada, Wales, England 1896-1989 was published by Dr. Joanne Collins-Gonsalves (Edmonton: Atlantic Academic Publishing Inc, 2023).

== See also ==
- First women lawyers around the world
