= Cambrian Law Review =

- Discipline: Welsh academic law journal
- Language: English

Publication details
- History: 1970–2017
- Publisher: Committee of the Cambrian Law Review

Standard abbreviations
- ISO 4: Cambr. Law Rev.

Indexing
- ISSN: 0084-8328
- OCLC no.: 1788540

The Cambrian Law Review is a Welsh academic law journal containing articles on British and international law, book reviews, and obituaries. It is published by the Committee of the Cambrian Law Review, on behalf of the Department of Law and Criminology, Aberystwyth University.

The journal is being digitised by the Welsh Journals Online project at the National Library of Wales.
