= Joanne Hamilton =

British parasitologist

- Scientific career
- Institutions: Aberystwyth University

Joanne Hamilton is a British parasitologist. She is Professor in the Institute of Biological, Environmental and Rural Sciences at Aberystwyth University.

== Research ==
Hamilton looks at the interactions of parasites and their host organisms using molecular and proteomic techniques, she investigates how parasites can overcome the host immune response.

== Public outreach ==
Hamilton was involved in a schools partnership project SusNet Wales where school students took part in research looking at drug resistance in parasitic nematodes.

She spoke at TEDxAberystwyth in 2017, giving 'A guided tour of Parasites'.

In 2018 she appeared in Channel 4's Fatberg Autopsy: Secrets of the Sewers, where she found pathogenic bacteria and eggs of parasites within the congealed fat deposit.

== Honours and awards ==
In 2004 Hamilton was awarded a Commendation in the SET for Britain competition at the UK Parliament's House of Commons. She achieved Fellowship of the Higher Education Academy in 2007 and Senior Fellowship in 2015. In 2016 Hamilton was awarded a Sustain Wales Award for her work on the SusNet project and was awarded fellowship of the Royal Society of Biology in 2017.
