= Aberystwyth University =

University in Wales

Coordinates: 52.41806°N 4.06576°W

- Prifysgol Aberystwyth
- Former names: University of Wales, Aberystwyth
- Motto: Welsh: Nid Byd, Byd Heb Wybodaeth
- Motto in English: A world without knowledge is no world at all
- Type: Public
- Established: 1872; 154 years ago (as The University College of Wales)
- Affiliations: ACU; AMBA; Universities UK; University of Wales
- Endowment: £33.1 million (2025)
- Budget: £124.8 million (2024/25)
- Chancellor: Dame Nicola Davies
- Vice-Chancellor: Jon Timmis
- Academic staff: 690 (2024/25)
- Administrative staff: 1,080 (2024/25)
- Students: 8,970 (2024/25)
- Undergraduates: 7,375 (2024/25)
- Postgraduates: 1,590 (2024/25)
- Location: Aberystwyth, Wales
- Campus: 1,709 hectares (4,220 acres)
Colours
- Website: aber.ac.uk

Aberystwyth University (Welsh: Prifysgol Aberystwyth) is a public research university in Aberystwyth, Wales. Aberystwyth was a founding member institution of the former federal University of Wales. The university has 8,970 students studying across three academic faculties and 17 departments.

Founded in 1872 as University College Wales, Aberystwyth, it became a founder member of the University of Wales in 1894, and changed its name to the University College of Wales, Aberystwyth. In the mid-1990s, the university again changed its name to become the University of Wales, Aberystwyth. On 1 September 2007, the University of Wales ceased to be a federal university and Aberystwyth University became independent again. The annual income of the institution for 2024–2025 was £124.8 million of which £19.2 million was from research grants and contracts, with an expenditure of £130.3 million.

== History ==
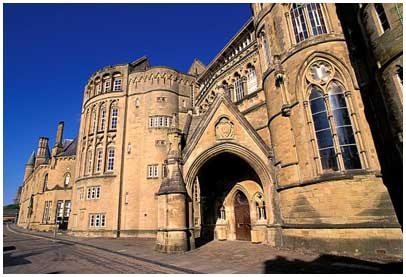
Old College

Coat of arms, including motto

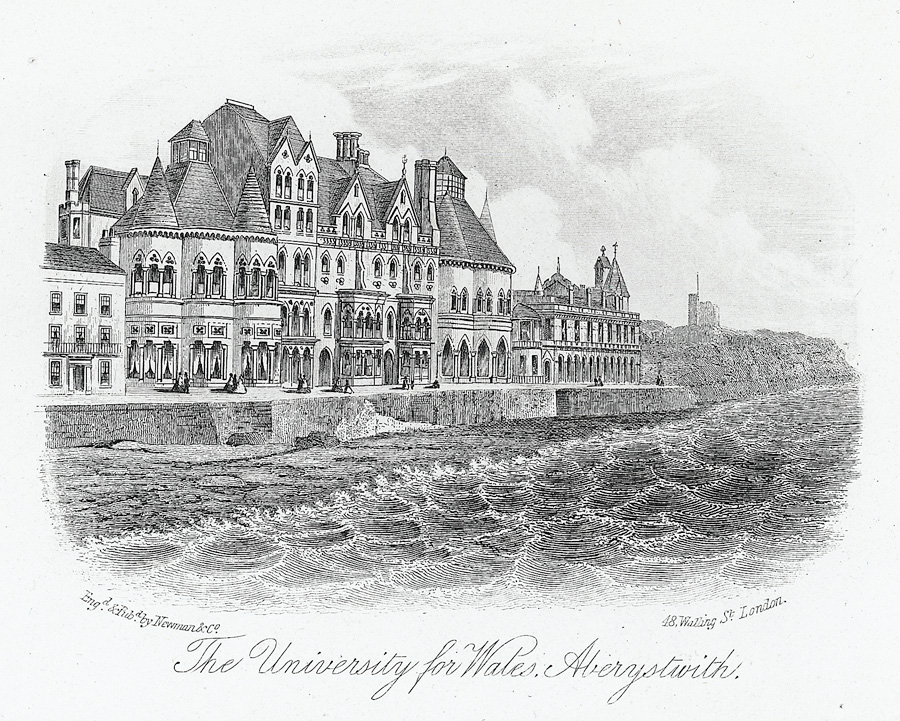
The University for Wales, Aberystwyth, c. 1870

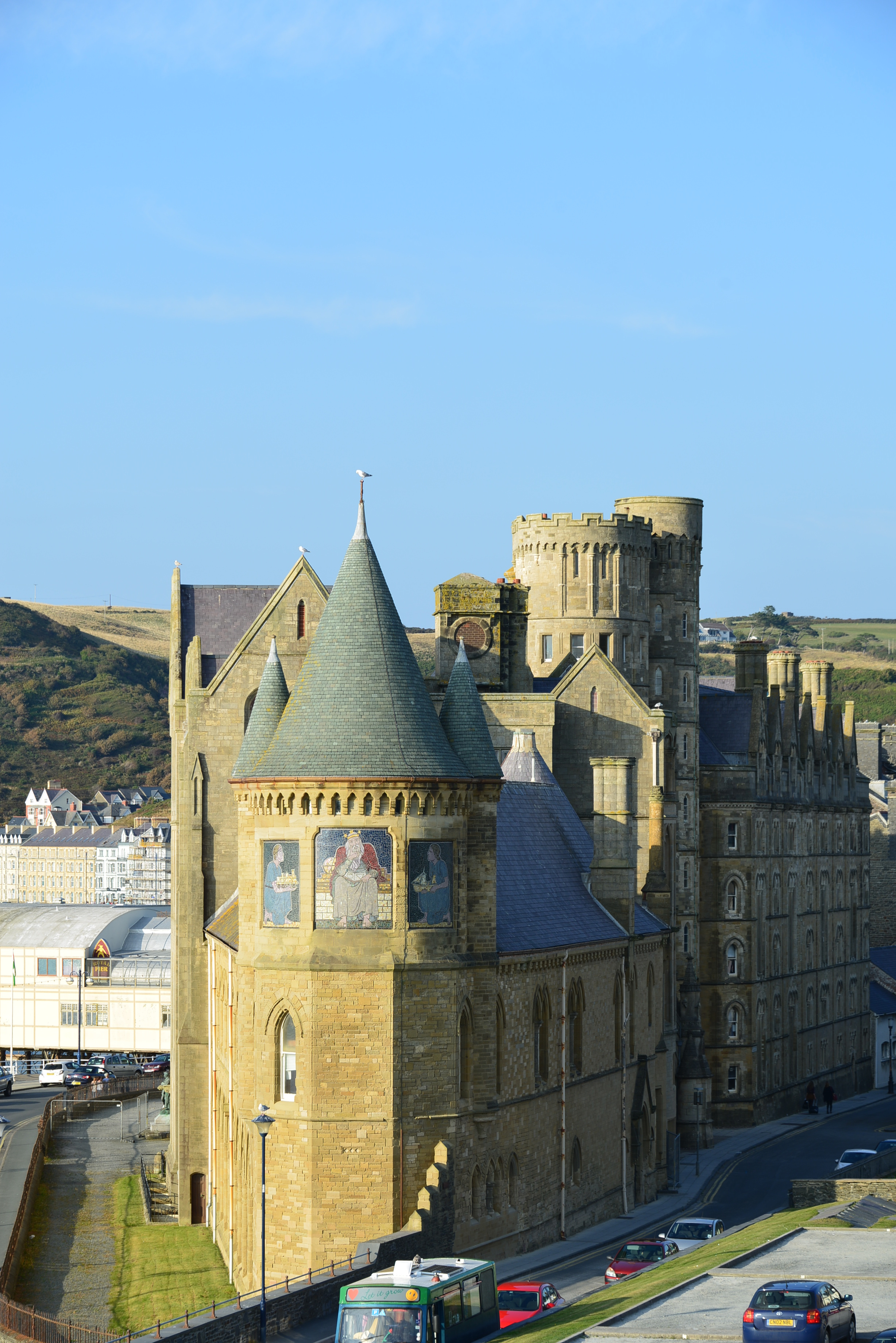
Old College Building from the castle

In the middle of the 19th century, eminent Welsh people were advocating the establishment of a university in the principality of Wales. One of these, Thomas Nicholas, whose book, Middle and High Class Schools, and University Education for Wales (1863), is said to have "exerted great influence on educated Welshmen".

Funded through public and private subscriptions, and with five regional committees (London, Manchester, Liverpool, North and South Wales) guaranteeing funds for the first three years' running costs, university college opened in October 1872 with 26 students. Thomas Charles Edwards was the principal. In October 1875, chapels in Wales raised the next tranche of funds from over 70,000 contributors. Until 1893, when the college joined the University of Wales as a founder member, students applying to Aberystwyth sat the University of London's entrance exams. Women were admitted in 1884.

In 1885, a fire damaged what is now known as the Old College, Aberystwyth, and in 1897 the first 14 acres of what became the main Penglais campus were purchased. Incorporated by royal charter in 1893, the university installed Albert Edward, Prince of Wales, as chancellor in 1896, the same year it awarded an honorary degree to the former British prime minister, William Gladstone.

The university's coat of arms dates from the 1880s. The shield features two red dragons to symbolise Wales, and an open book to symbolise learning. The crest, an eagle or phoenix above a flaming tower, may signify the college's rebirth after the 1885 fire. The motto is Nid Byd, Byd Heb Wybodaeth ('a world without knowledge is no world at all').

In the early 1900s, the university added courses that included law, applied mathematics, pure mathematics and botany. The Department for International Politics, which Aberystwyth says is the oldest such department in the world, was founded in 1919. By 1977, the university's staff included eight Fellows of the Royal Society, such as Gwendolen Rees, the first Welsh woman to be elected an FRS.

The Department of Sports and Exercise Science was established in 2000. Joint honours psychology degrees were introduced in September 2007, and single honours psychology in 2009.

The chancellor of the university is Dame Nicola Davies, who took up the position in January 2025. The visitor of the university is an appointment made by the privy council, under the royal charter of the university. Since July 2014, the holder of this office is Sir Roderick Evans.

In 2011, the university appointed a new vice chancellor under whom the academic departments were restructured as larger subject-themed institutes.

In 2022, the university celebrated its 150th anniversary, being established in 1872 (known at the time as The University College of Wales).

== Organisation and administration ==
=== Departments and Faculties ===
The university's academic departments, as well as the Arts Centre, International English Centre and Music Centre are organised in three faculties:

Faculty of Arts and Social Sciences

- School of Art
- Arts Centre
- School of Education
- Department of English and Creative Writing
- Department of History and Welsh History
- International English Centre
- Department of International Politics
- Department of Law and Criminology
- Department of Modern Languages
- Music Centre
- Department of Theatre, Film and Television Studies
- Department of Welsh and Celtic Studies

Faculty of Business and Physical Sciences

- Aberystwyth Business School
- Department of Computer Science
- Department of Information Studies
- Department of Mathematics
- Department of Physics

Faculty of Earth and Life Sciences

- Institute of Biological, Environmental and Rural Sciences
- Department of Geography and Earth Sciences
- Department of Psychology

==== Institute of Biological, Environmental and Rural Sciences ====
The Institute of Biological, Environmental and Rural Sciences (IBERS) is a research and teaching centre which brings together staff from the Institutes of Rural Sciences and Biological Sciences and the Institute of Grassland and Environmental Research (IGER). Around 360 research, teaching and support staff conduct basic, strategic and applied research in biology.

The institute is located in two areas; one at the main teaching Penglais campus and another rural research hub at the Gogerddan campus.

==== Aberystwyth Business School ====
In 1998, the Department of Economics (founded in 1912), the Department of Accounting and Finance (founded in 1979) and the Centre for Business Studies merged to create the School of Management and Business. In 2013, the School joined the Department of Information Studies and the Department of Law and Criminology at a new campus at Llanbadarn Fawr. The school was shortlisted for "Business School of the Year" in the Times Higher Education Awards (2014). In 2016, the institute, minus the Department of Information Studies, was renamed the Institute of Business and Law, the remaining departments being renamed Aberystwyth Business School and Aberystwyth Law School.

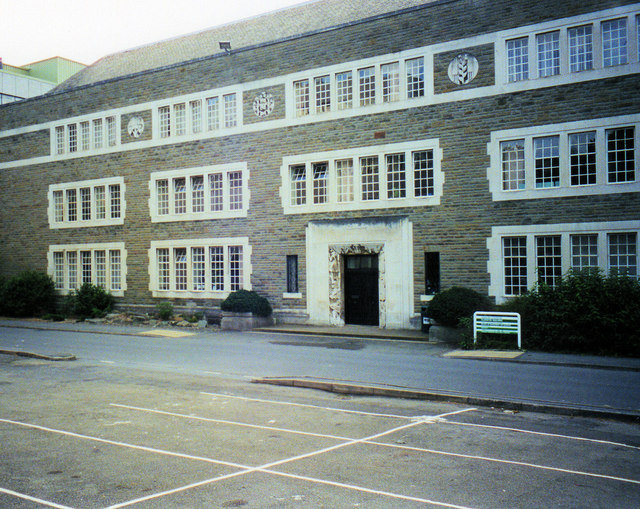
Cledwyn Building, former home of the School of Economics

==== Department of Computer Science ====
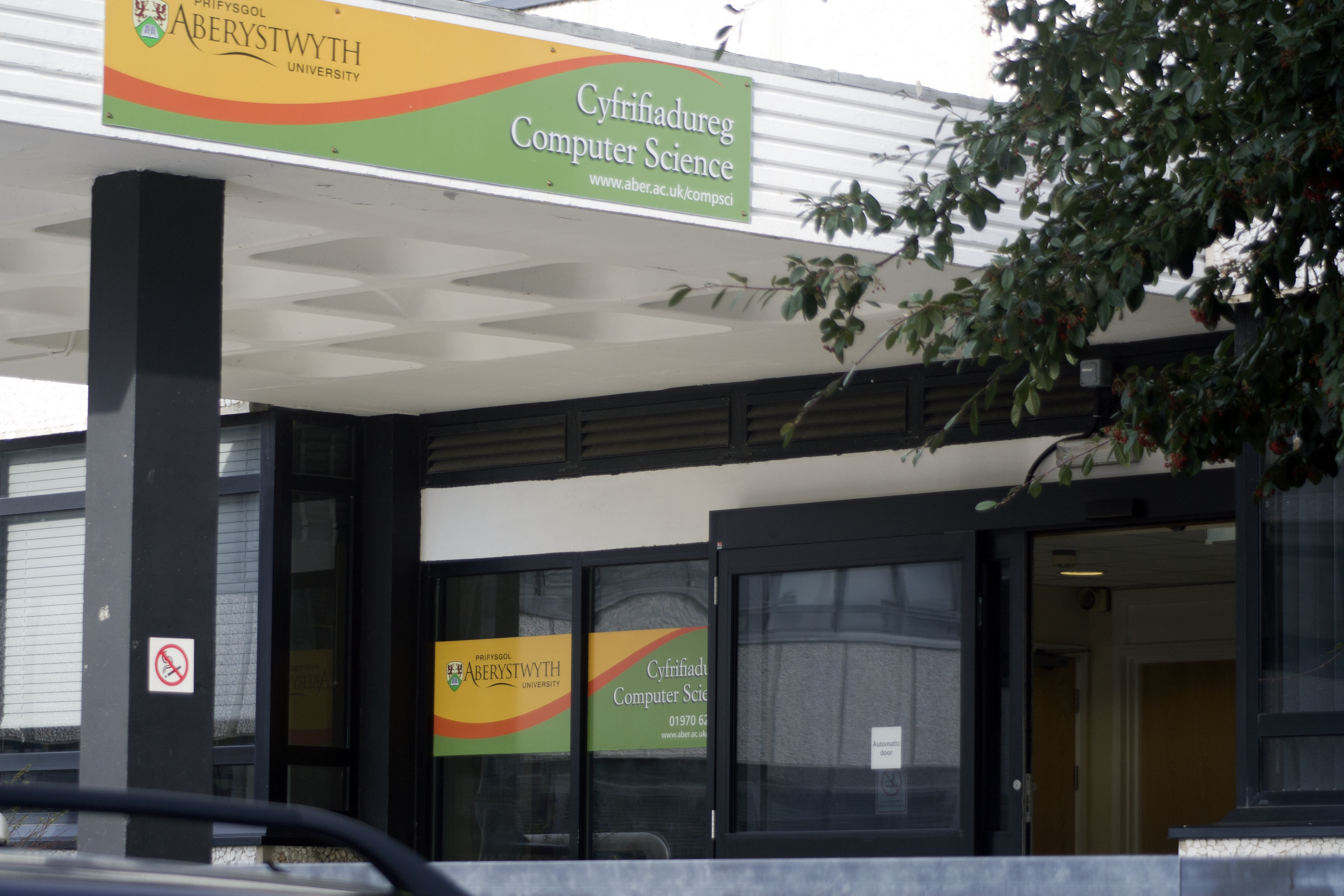
The Llandinam Building

The Department of Computer Science (founded in 1970), conducts research in automated reasoning, computational biology, vision graphics and visualisation and intelligent robotics.

AberMUD, the first popular internet-based MUD, was written in the department by then-student Alan Cox. Jan Pinkava, another graduate, won an Oscar for his short animated film Geri's Game.

==== Department of Geography and Earth Sciences ====
The Department of Geography and Earth Sciences (IGES) was formed, in 1989, from the former Departments of Geography (established in 1918) and Geology. It houses the E. G. Bowen map library, containing 80,000 maps and 500 atlases.

==== Department of Information Studies ====
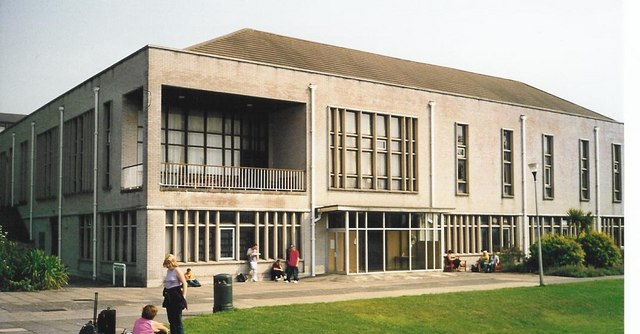
CLW Library, Llanbadarn – later named the Thomas Parry Library

The College of Librarianship Wales (CLW) was established at Llanbadarn Fawr in 1964, in response to a recommendation for the training of bilingual librarians that was made in the Bourdillon Report on Standards of public library service in England (HMSO, 1962). The college grew rapidly, developing close links to the Welsh speaking and professional communities, acquiring an international reputation and pioneering flexible and distance learning courses. It claimed to be Europe's largest institution for training librarians. The independent college merged with the university in August 1989 and the department moved to the Penglais campus a quarter of a century later. Following the merger, the new department took over responsibility for existing offerings in archives administration and modern records management.

==== Department of International Politics ====
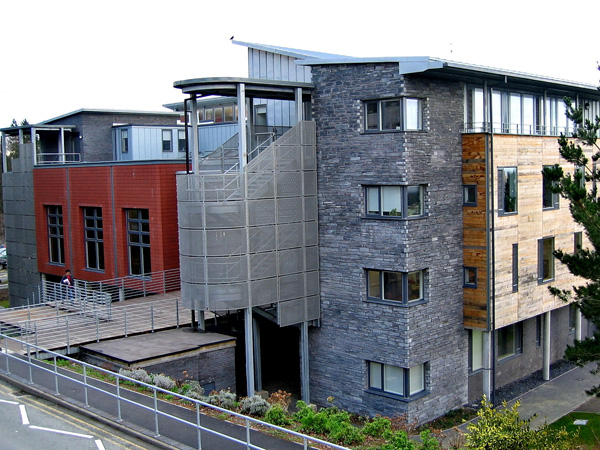
International Politics building

The Department of International Politics is the oldest of its kind in the world. It was founded, shortly after the First World War in 1919, with the stated purpose of furthering political understanding of the world in the hope of avoiding such conflicts in the future. This goal led to the creation of the Woodrow Wilson Chair of International Politics, with Wilson having played a significant role in its creation. The department has over 700 students from 40 countries studying at undergraduate, masters and PhD levels. It achieved a 95% score for student satisfaction in the 2016 National Student Survey, placing it as the highest-ranking politics department in Wales and within the UK's top ten.

The department has hosted notable academic staff in the field including E. H. Carr, Leopold Kohr, Andrew Linklater, Ken Booth, Steve Smith, Michael Cox, Michael MccGwire, Jenny Edkins and Colin J. McInnes.

==== Department of Law and Criminology ====
The Department of Law and Criminology (founded in 1901) is housed in the Hugh Owen Building on the Penglais campus, and includes the Centre for Welsh Legal Affairs, a specialist research centre. All academic staff are engaged in research, and the International Journal of Biosciences and the Law and the Cambrian Law Review are edited in the department. In 2013, the department joined the Department of Information Studies and the School of Management and Business at a new campus at Llanbadarn Fawr, as part of a newly created Institute of Management, Law and Information Studies. In September 2018, the department moved back to the Hugh Owen Building, based in the Penglais campus, and its name changed from Aberystwyth Law School to the Department of Law and Criminology.

The Guardian University Guide 2018 ranked the Law Department at 69th in the UK, and "The Times" Higher Education Guide ranks it as 300th globally.

==== Department of Modern Languages ====
Aberystwyth has taught modern languages since 1874. French, German, Italian and Spanish courses are taught at both beginners' and advanced levels, in a research-active academic environment. One of its research projects is the Anglo-Norman Dictionary, based in Aberystwyth since 2001 and available online since 2005.

==== Department of Physics ====
Physics was first taught at Aberystwyth as part of Natural Philosophy, Astronomy and Mathematics under N. R. Grimley, soon after the foundation of the University College. It became a department in 1877, under the leadership of F. W. Rudler. The department was located in the south wing of what is now the Old College, but later moved to the Physics Building on the Penglais Campus. The first chair in Physics was offered to D. E. Jones in 1885. Before the First World War, much of the early research in the department was undertaken in Germany. Early research in the 1900s was concerned with electrical conductivity and quantum theory, later moving into thermal conductivity and acoustics. In 1931, the department hosted the Faraday Centenary Exhibition. E. J. Williams was appointed to the Chair of Physics in 1938 where he continued his research into sub-atomic particles using a cloud chamber. Following the Second World War, research was concerned with mechanical and nuclear physics, later moving into the fields of air density, experimental rocket launching equipment and radar.

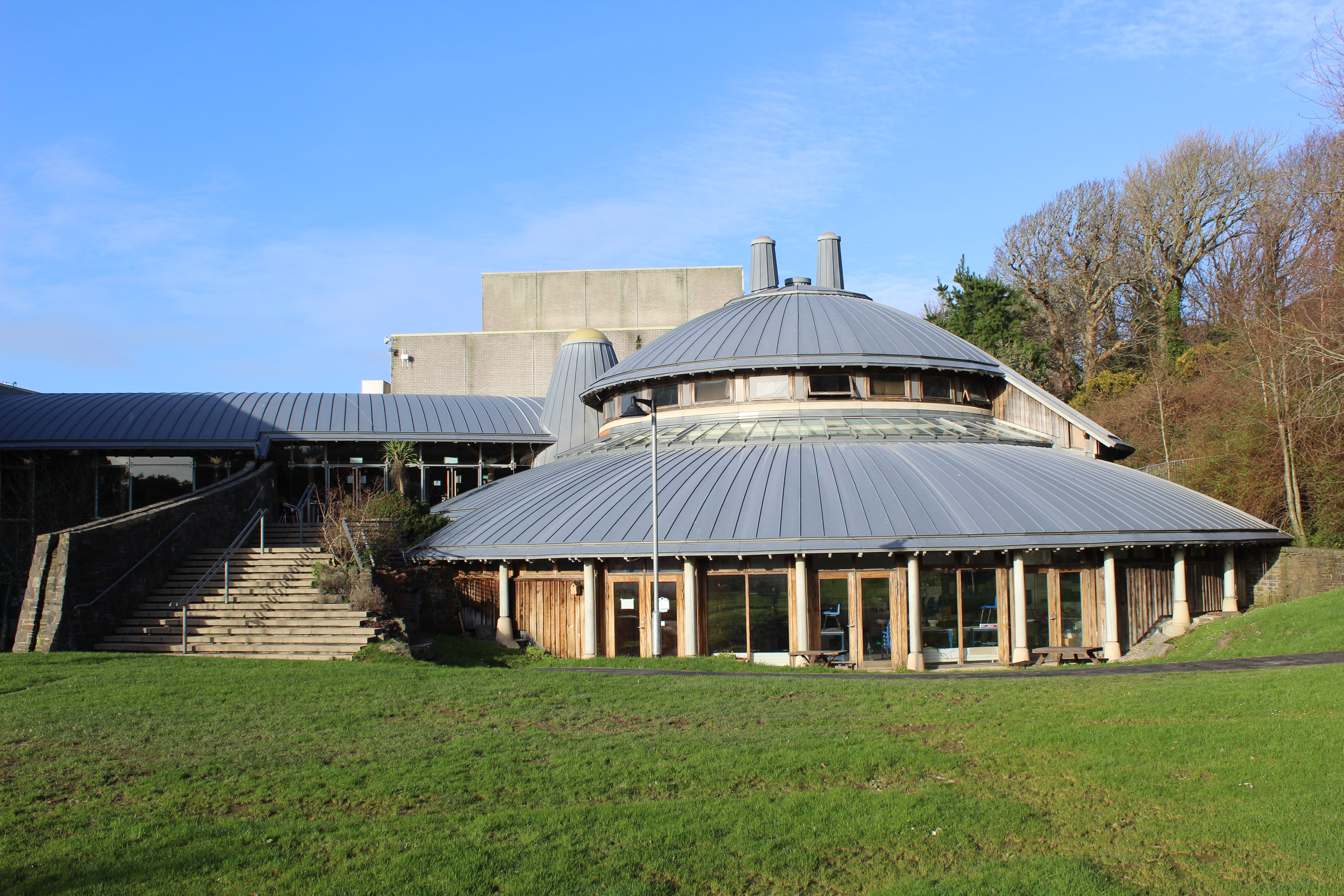
Arts Studio

==== Department of Psychology ====
In 2007, Aberystwyth established psychology as a "Centre for Applied Psychology" within the Department of International Politics. By 2011, psychology had moved into its current premises in Penbryn 5 on the Penglais Campus. The department has over 550 undergraduate students, with degrees accredited by the British Psychological Society and is home to an MSc in Behaviour Change.

== Campuses ==
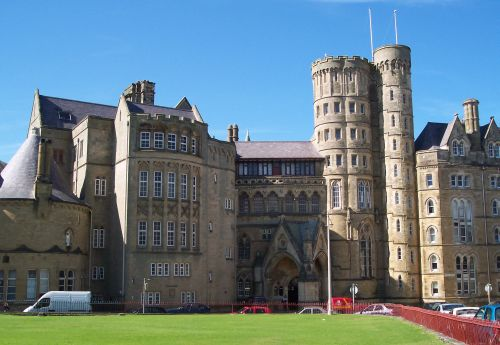
Old College east entrance

=== Penglais ===
The main campus of the university is situated on Penglais Hill, overlooking the town of Aberystwyth and Cardigan Bay, and comprises most of the university buildings, Arts Centre, Students' Union, and many of the student residences. Just below Penglais Campus is the National Library of Wales, one of Britain's five legal deposit libraries. The landscaping of the Penglais Campus is historically significant and is listed at Grade II* on the Cadw/ICOMOS Register of Parks and Gardens of Special Historic Interest in Wales. The CADW listing states,

"The landscaping of the University of Wales, Aberystwyth campuses, particularly the earlier Penglais campus, is of exceptional historic interest as one of the most important modern landscaping schemes in Wales...One section of the Penglais campus was designed by the well known landscape architect Brenda Colvin and is one of the very few of her schemes to have survived. A number of women have played a key role in the development and planting of the whole site."

=== Llanbadarn ===
The Llanbadarn Centre is located approximately one mile to the east of the Penglais Campus, near Llanbadarn Fawr, overlooking the town and Cardigan Bay to the west, with the backdrop of the Cambrian Mountains to the east. Llanbadarn Centre hosted Aberystwyth Law School and Aberystwyth Business School, which together formed the Institute of Business and Law. The Department of Information Studies is also based there. Additionally, the Llanbadarn Campus is the site of the Aberystwyth branch of Coleg Ceredigion (a further education college, and not part of the university).

=== Gogerddan ===
At Gogerddan, on the outskirts of town is located the university's major centre for research in land based sciences and the main centre for the Institute of Biological, Environmental and Rural Science.

=== School of Art, Edward Davies Building ===
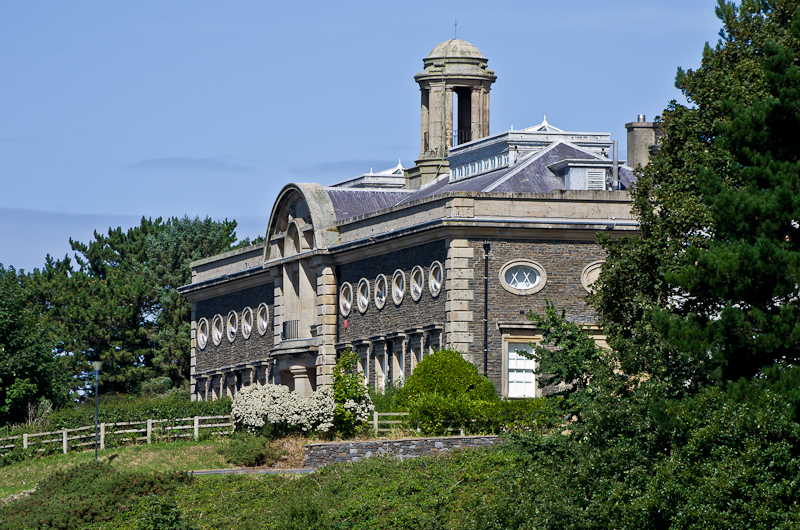
Edward Davies Building

The School of Art is located between the Penglais Campus and the centre of Aberystwyth, in what was originally the Edward Davies Memorial Chemistry Laboratories. A listed building, the Edward Davies Building is one of the finest examples of architecture in Aberystwyth.

=== Old College ===
The site of the original university is the Old College, currently the subject of the "New Life for Old College" project which aims to transform it into an integrated centre of heritage, culture, learning and knowledge exchange.

=== Aberystwyth Mauritius ===
The university opened an international campus in Mauritius in 2015 operating as Aberystwyth University (Mauritian Branch Campus) and registered with the Tertiary Education Commission of Mauritius, but closed it to new enrolments two years later due to low enrolment numbers. Fewer than 200 students enrolled with the Mauritius campus, which had the capacity for 2,000 students, before its 2018 closure and the university lost more than a million pounds as a result of the venture.

=== Student residences ===
Most of the student residences are on campus, with the rest in walking distance of the campus and Aberystwyth town centre. Accommodation ranges from "traditional" catered residences to en-suite self-catered accommodation, and from budget rooms to more luxurious studio apartments. All have wired access to the university's computer network and a support network of residential tutors.

==== Penglais Campus ====
- Cwrt Mawr (self-catered flats, single rooms, capacity 503)
- Neuadd Pantycelyn (Welsh speaking traditional catered hall, refurbished in 2020, capacity 200)
- Penbryn (used for catered conferences, capacity 350)
- Rosser (self-catered en-suite flats, capacity 336),
- Rosser G (postgraduate flats following 2011 expansion to Rosser, capacity 60)
- Trefloyne (self-catered flats, capacity 147)

==== Pentre Jane Morgan (Student Village) ====
- Almost 200 individual houses arranged in closes and cul-de-sacs. Each house typically accommodates five or six students. The total capacity is 1,003.

==== Fferm Penglais Student Residence ====
- Purpose-built student accommodation with studio apartments and en-suite bedrooms (total capacity 1,000). An area of accommodation within the Fferm Penglais Student Residence is set aside for students who are Welsh learners or fluent Welsh speakers and who wish to live in a Welsh speaking environment.

==== Town accommodation (privately owned) ====
- Seafront Residences (self-catered flats located on the seafront and Queen's Road, overall capacity 361). The original Seafront residences, Plyn' and Caerleon, were destroyed by fire in 1998.
- Seafront residences include Aberglasney, Balmoral, Blaenwern, Caerleon, Carpenter, Pumlumon, Ty Glyndwr, and Ty Gwerin Halls.

Disabled access rooms are available within the existing student village.

== Reputation and academic profile ==
Rankings
National rankings
- Complete (2027): 56
- Guardian (2027): 98
- Times / Sunday Times (2027): 63

Global rankings
- QS (2027): 801–850
- THE (2026): 601–800

Aberystwyth University is placed in the UK's top 40 universities in the main national rankings. It is ranked 38th for 132 UK university rankings in The Times/Sunday Times Good University Guide for 2023, and the first university to be given the prestigious award "University of the year for teaching quality" for two consecutive years, in 2018 and 2019.

The Times Higher Education World University Rankings placed it in the 301—350 group for 800 university rankings, compared with 351—400 the previous year, and the QS World University Rankings placed it at the 432nd position for 2019, compared with 481—490 of the previous year. In 2015, UK employers from "predominantly business, IT and engineering sectors" listed Aberystwyth equal 49th in their 62-place employability rankings for UK graduates, according to a Times Higher Education report.

Aberystwyth University was rated in the top ten of UK higher education institutions for overall student satisfaction in the 2016 National Student Survey (NSS).

Aberystwyth University was shortlisted in four categories in the Times Higher Education Leadership and Management Awards (THELMAs) (2015).

Aberystwyth University has been awarded the Silver Award under the Corporate Health Standard (CHS), the quality mark for workplace health promotion run by Welsh Government.

The university has been awarded an Athena SWAN Charter Award, recognising commitment to advancing women's careers in science, technology, engineering, maths and medicine (STEMM) in higher education and research.

In 2007, the university came under criticism for its record on sustainability, ranking 97th out of 106 UK higher education institutions in that year's Green League table. In 2012 the university was listed in the table's "Failed, no award" section, ranking equal 132nd out of 145. In 2013 it ranked equal 135th out of 143, and was listed again as "Failed, no award".

Following the university's initiatives to address sustainability, it received an EcoCampus Silver Phase award in October 2014.

In October 2015, the university's Penglais Campus became the first university campus in Wales to achieve the Green Flag Award. The Green Flag Award is a UK-wide partnership, delivered in Wales by Keep Wales Tidy with support from Natural Resources Wales, and is the mark of a high quality park or green space.

In 2013, the University and College Union alleged bullying behaviour by Aberystwyth University managers, and said staff were fearful for their jobs. The university president, Sir Emyr Jones Parry, said in a BBC radio interview, "I don't believe the views set out are representative and I don't recognise the picture." He also said, "Due process is rigorously applied in Aberystwyth." The economist John Cable resigned his emeritus professorship, describing the university's management as "disproportionate, aggressive and confrontational". The singer Peter Karrie resigned his honorary fellowship in protest, he said, at the apparent determination to "ruin one of the finest arts centres in the country", and because he was "unable to support any regime that can treat their staff in such a cruel and appalling manner".

In Autumn 2024, students protested the reduction of opening hours at Hugh Owen Library, a cost-cutting measure. Students argued that the university had continued to promote their 24/7 Library until recent open days, and that they were going back on promises which had attracted many students to the University. The University initially met with students to discuss options to restore the library's original opening hours, but later rejected further requests for meetings, and refused to negotiate any further.

== Student life ==
=== Students' union ===
Undeb Aber (English: Aber Union), previously named Aberystwyth Student Union (Undeb Myfyrwyr Aberystwyth), is Aberystwyth University's student union. Undeb Aber oversees over 100 student groups run by the students. The student union also provides independent advice for the university's students.

Undeb Myfyrwyr Cymraeg Aberystwyth (English: Aberystwyth Welsh Language Students' Union), or UMCA, represents Welsh language students at Aberystwyth University. Founded in 1973, UMCA's main purpose is to ensure the Welsh language and culture remains a key part of the university. One of its most well known campaigns was to preserve the Welsh language hall, Neuadd Pantycelyn and prevent it from closing. The campaign was a success, with the university refurbishing the hall and continuing to accommodate students.

=== Student groups ===
There are over 100 student groups at Aberystwyth University. The Debating Society was one of the first student groups founded in 1872, making it the oldest debating society in Wales.

== Officers and academics ==
Presidents and chancellors

- 1872–95 Henry Austin Bruce, 1st Lord Aberdare
- 1895–1913 Stuart, Lord Rendel
- 1913–26 Sir John Williams, 1st Bt
- 1926–44 Edmund Davies, Lord Edmund-Davies
- 1944–54 Thomas Jones (T. J.)
- 1955–64 Sir David Hughes Parry
- 1964–76 Sir Ben Bowen Thomas
- 1977–85 Cledwyn Hughes, Lord Cledwyn of Penrhos
- 1985–97 Melvyn Rosser
- 1997–2007 Elystan Morgan, Lord Elystan-Morgan
- 2007–17 Sir Emyr Jones Parry
- 2018–2025 John, Lord Thomas of Cwmgiedd
- 2025–present Nicola Davies

Principals and vice-chancellors

- 1872–91 Thomas Charles Edwards
- 1891–1919 Thomas Francis Roberts
- 1919–26 John Humphreys Davies
- 1927–34 Sir Henry Stuart-Jones
- 1934–52 Ifor Leslie Evans
- 1953–57 Goronwy Rees
- 1958–69 Sir Thomas Parry
- 1969–79 Sir Goronwy Daniel
- 1979–89 Gareth Owen
- 1989–94 Kenneth, Lord Morgan
- 1994–2004 Derec Llwyd Morgan
- 2004–11 Noel Lloyd
- 2011–16 April McMahon
- 2016–17 John Grattan (acting)
- 2017–2023 Elizabeth Treasure
- 2024– Jon Timmis

Academics

- Henry Bird, Lecturer in Art History (1936–41)
- Ken Booth, Professor of International Politics
- Mary Brebner, Lecturer in Modern Languages and Latin (1898–1919)
- Edward Carr, Historian, Woodrow Wilson Professor of International Politics
- Melissa Chapot, Geochronologist
- Sir Henry Walford Davies, Master of the King's Music
- John Davies, Welsh historian
- Hannah Dee, Lecturer in Computer Science
- R. Geraint Gruffydd, Chair of Welsh Language and Literature (1970–79)
- Joanne Hamilton, Professor of Zoology and Parasitology
- David Russell Hulme, Director of Music (1992–2020), conductor, musicologist
- Robert Maynard Jones, Chair of Welsh Language (1980)
- D. Gwenallt Jones, poet, Welsh Lecturer
- Leopold Kohr, Economist, Political Scientist
- Dennis Lindley, Professor of Statistics (1960–67)
- David John de Lloyd, Gregynog Professor of Music, composer
- Alec Muffett, Systems Programmer (1988–92)
- Charles Musselwhite, Professor of Psychology (2021-)
- Lily Newton, Professor of Botany
- Ian Parrott, Gregynog Professor of Music (1950–83), composer, musicologist
- Joseph Parry, Professor of Music, composer, conductor
- Sir Thomas Herbert Parry-Williams, poet, Professor of Welsh (1920–52)
- F. Gwendolen Rees FRS Professor of Zoology
- Huw Rees FRS (1923–2009), Geneticist
- William Rubinstein, Professor of History
- Marie Breen Smyth, Reader in Political Violence, International Politics
- Howard 'Sid' Thomas, Professor of Botany
- Richard Marggraf Turley, Professor of Engagement with the Public Imagination
- Dame Marjorie Williamson, Principal, Royal Holloway, London (1962–73)
- Richard Henry Yapp, botanist

== Alumni ==
Royalty

- Charles III, King of the United Kingdom
- Tunku Muhriz Ibni Almarhum Tunku Munawir, 11th Yang Di Pertuan Besar (Grand Ruler) of Negeri Sembilan, Malaysia (2008–present)
- Tunku Naquiyuddin, Tunku Laksamana of Negeri Sembilan, Malaysia (Regent: 1994–99)
- Ahmad Tejan Kabbah, 3rd President of Sierra Leone (1996–7)

Academia

- E. G. Bowen, geographer
- Sir Edward Collingwood, mathematician, scientist
- Alan Cox, programmer (major contributor to the Linux kernel, 1980s)
- D. J. Davies, economist, socialist, Plaid Cymru activist
- Natasha Devon, writer, mental health activist
- Andrew Gordon, naval historian
- Harry Evans Hallam, chemist
- Sir Deian Hopkin, historian
- David Russell Hulme, director of music (1992 -2020), conductor and musicologist
- Rhiannon Ifans, Welsh and Celtic medieval specialist, author
- Christine James, first female Archdruid of Wales
- David Gwilym James vice-chancellor, University of Southampton 1952–65
- Emrys Jones, professor of geography, London School of Economics
- T. Harri Jones, poet
- Roy Kift, dramatist, writer
- Mary King, political scientist
- Michael MccGwire, international relations specialist, naval commander
- Twm Morys, poet
- Tavi Murray, glaciologist, Polar Medallist
- Ernest Charles Nelson, botanist
- David Hughes Parry, vice-chancellor, University of London (1945–48)
- T. H. Parry-Williams, poet, author, academic
- Frederick Soddy, Nobel Prize Winner in Chemistry (1921)
- Vaughan Southgate OBE DL PPFLS FRSM FRSB FZS (born 1944), parasitologist
- Sir John Meurig Thomas FRS, chemist, professor, author
- Paul Thomas, founding vice-chancellor, University of the Sunshine Coast
- Sir Nigel Thrift, geographer, vice chancellor, University of Warwick
- David John Williams, writer
- Sir Glanmor Williams, historian
- John Tudno Williams, theologian
- Waldo Williams, poet
- William Richard Williams, theologian
- Gladys Mary Wrigley (1885–1975) geographer and editor, Geographical Review

Law

- Salleh Abas, Lord President of the Federal Court, Malaysia (1984–88)
- Belinda Ang, judge, Supreme Court of Singapore (2003–)
- Sir Alun Talfan Davies, judge, publisher
- Sir Ellis Ellis-Griffith, 1st Bt, barrister, Liberal politician
- Iris de Freitas Brazao, first female prosecuting lawyer in the Caribbean
- Sir Samuel Thomas Evans, barrister, judge, Liberal politician
- Elwyn, Lord Elwyn-Jones, lord chancellor (1974–79)
- John, Lord Morris of Aberavon, attorney general (1997–99)
- Nor Hashimah Taib, Attorney General of Brunei (since 2024)

Civil servants

- Timothy Brain, Chief Constable for Gloucestershire (2001–10)
- Sir Goronwy Daniel, civil servant, academic

Politics

- Shaun Bailey, Conservative MP
- Rachel Barrett, Welsh suffragette and newspaper editor
- Joe Borg, European Union oceans and fisheries commissioner (2004–10)
- Roderic Bowen, Liberal MP, Commons deputy speaker
- Nicholas, Lord Bourne of Aberystwyth, Welsh Conservative leader (1999–2011)
- Rehman Chishti, Conservative MP (2010–), special envoy (2019–20)
- David Davies, 1st Baron Davies, Liberal politician, philanthropist
- Glyn Davies, Conservative MP
- Gwilym Prys Davies, Lord Prys-Davies, Labour peer (1982–2015)
- Gwynfor Evans, first Plaid Cymru MP
- Vaughan Gething, First Minister of Wales (2024)
- Steve Gilbert, Liberal Democrat MP (2010–15)
- Siân Gwenllian, Plaid Cymru AM
- Neil Hamilton, Conservative MP and AM, barrister
- Sylvia Hermon, Ulster Unionist politician
- Emlyn Hooson, Baron Hooson, Liberal politician
- Cledwyn Hughes, Baron Cledwyn of Penrhos, Labour politician
- Hishammuddin Hussein, defence minister, Malaysia, (2021–)
- Dan Jarvis, Labour MP Secretary of State for Defence
- Bethan Jenkins, Plaid Cymru AM for South Wales West
- Carwyn Jones, First Minister of Wales (2009–18), AM for Bridgend
- Gerry MacLochlainn Sinn Féin politician
- John Morris, Baron Morris of Aberavon, Labour politician
- Elystan Morgan, Baron Elystan-Morgan, Labour MP
- Roland Moyle, Labour MP, parliamentary private secretary to Clement Attlee
- Zack Polanski, Leader of the Green Party of England and Wales
- Will Quince, Conservative MP
- Dan Rogerson, Liberal Democrat MP
- Liz Saville Roberts, Plaid Cymru MP, and Westminster Leader (2017–)
- Molly Scott Cato, Green Party MEP
- Ahmed Shaheed, minister for foreign affairs, Maldives
- Virginijus Sinkevičius, European Union environment commissioner (2019–)
- Bob Stewart, Conservative MP
- Gareth Thomas, Labour MP
- Gareth Thomas, Labour MP
- Liz Twist (born 1956), Labour MP Blaydon
- Mark Williams, Liberal Democrat MP, Welsh LD Leader (2016–17)
- Mike Wood, Conservative MP
- Steven Woolfe, UK Independence Party MEP

Business

- Lance Batchelor, CEO, Domino's Pizza and Saga
- Geoff Drabble, CEO, Ashtead
- Belinda Earl, CEO, Debenhams and Jaeger
- Tom Singh, owner and CEO, New Look

Sports

- Cath Bishop, professional rower, civil servant
- John Dawes, Rugby player, captain of Wales and British Lions
- Carwyn James, Wales and British and Irish Lions Rugby coach (1949?–51)
- Wyn Jones, Wales and British and Irish Lions Rugby player
- Leigh Richmond Roose, international footballer
- Berwyn Price, gold medal Commonwealth Games (1978)
- Angela Tooby, silver medal, World Cross-Country Championships (1988)

Arts and entertainment

- Dorothy Bonarjee, Indian poet, artist
- Neil Brand, writer, composer, silent film accompanist
- Harry Brewis, British video essayist, YouTube personality
- Seth Clabough, American novelist, academic
- Shân Cothi, operatic singer, actress
- Jane Green, author
- Sarah Hall, writer, poet
- David Russell Hulme, conductor, musicologist
- Aneirin Hughes, actor
- Emrys James, actor
- Eveline Annie Jenkins (1893–1976), botanical artist
- Alex Jones, presenter, BBC One TV programme, The One Show (2010–)
- Melih Kibar, Turkish composer
- Alun Lewis, Second World War writer, poet
- Caryl Lewis, novelist
- Rick Lloyd, musician (Y Blew, Flying Pickets)
- Hayley Long, fiction writer
- Sharon Maguire, film director, Bridget Jones's Diary
- Matt McCooey, actor
- Alan Mehdizadeh, actor, Billy Elliot the Musical
- Robert Minhinnick, poet, essayist, novelist, translator
- Amy Parry-Williams (1910–1988), singer, writer
- Esther Pilkington, performance artist
- Jan Pinkava, Oscar-winning animated film director
- Rachel Roberts, actress
- Lisa Surihani, Malaysian actress
- Richard Roberts, theologian, pacifist
- Harry Venning, cartoonist, writer

Journalism

- Gareth Jones, journalist, publicised the Holodomor committed by the USSR against the Ukrainian people.
- Sir David Nicholas, journalist and ITN chief executive and chairman
- Jonathan Moyle, journalist, RAF pilot and alleged MI6 agent.
- Ed Zitron, technology writer and public relations specialist.

== Gallery ==
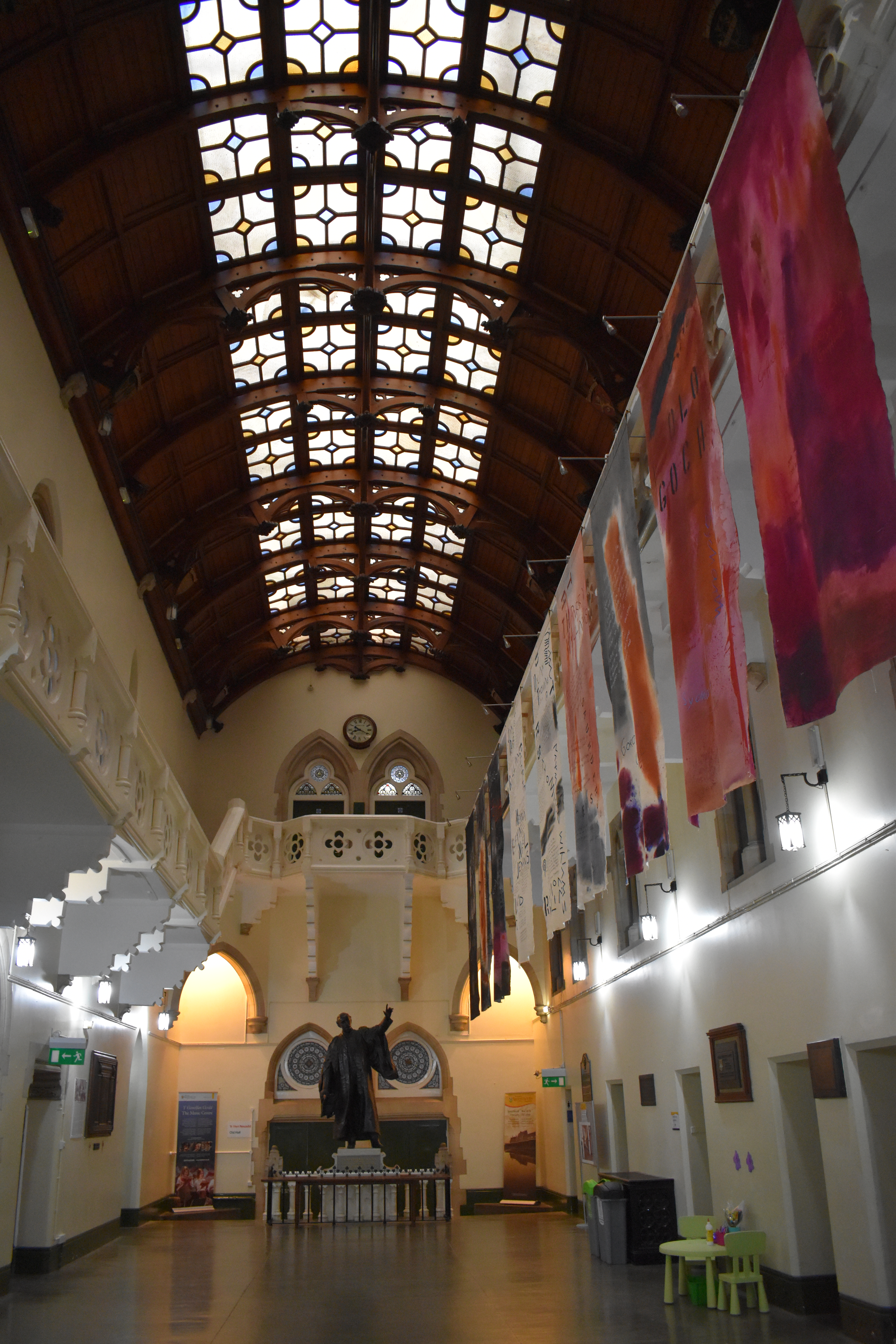
Old College, Aberystwyth

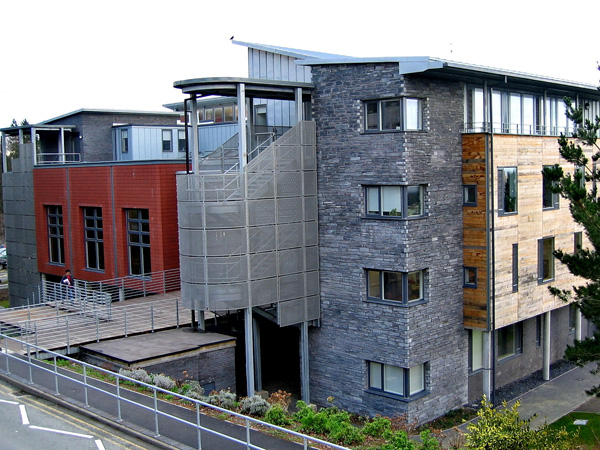
International Politics Building

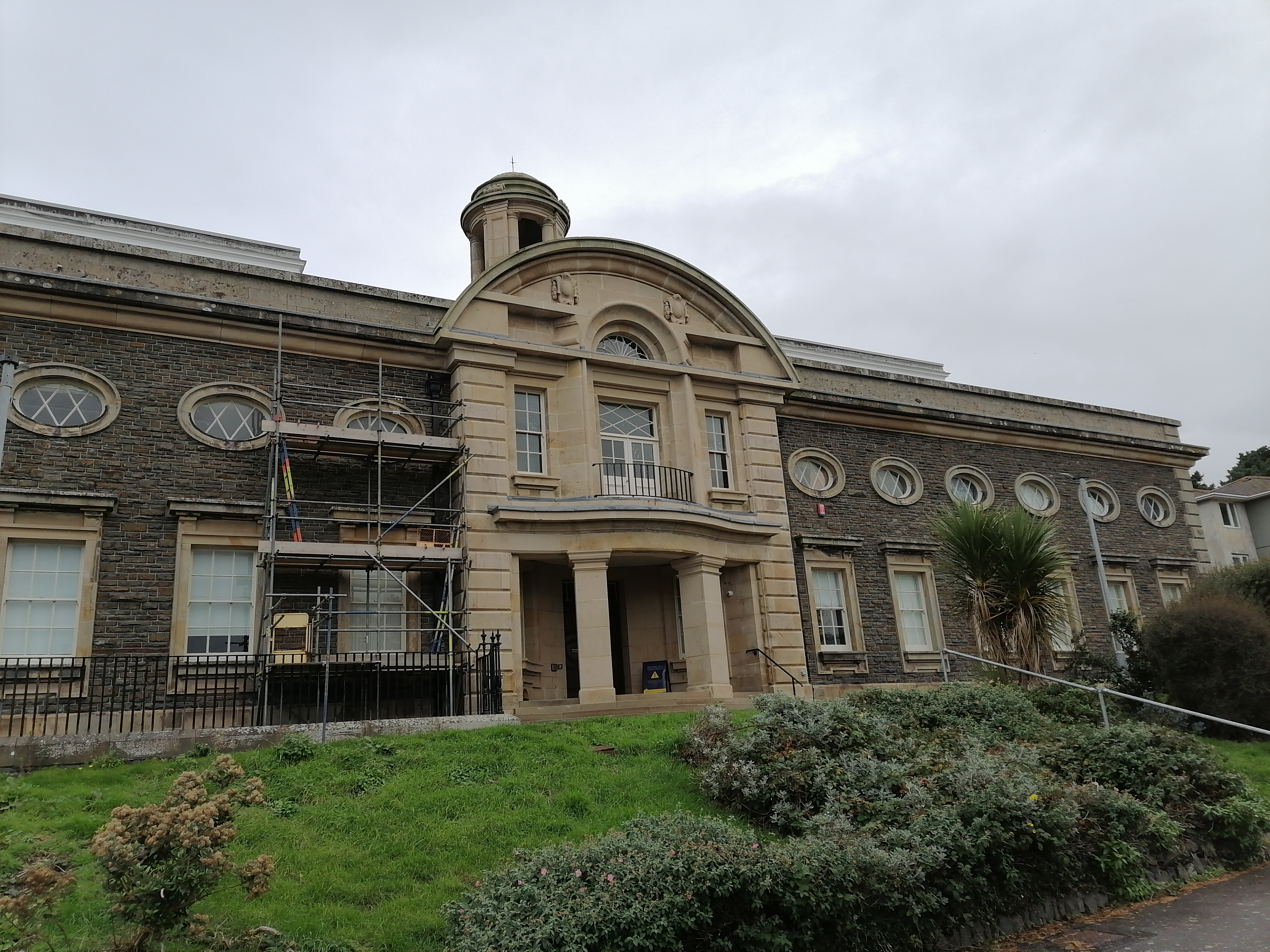
School of Art Museum and Gallery

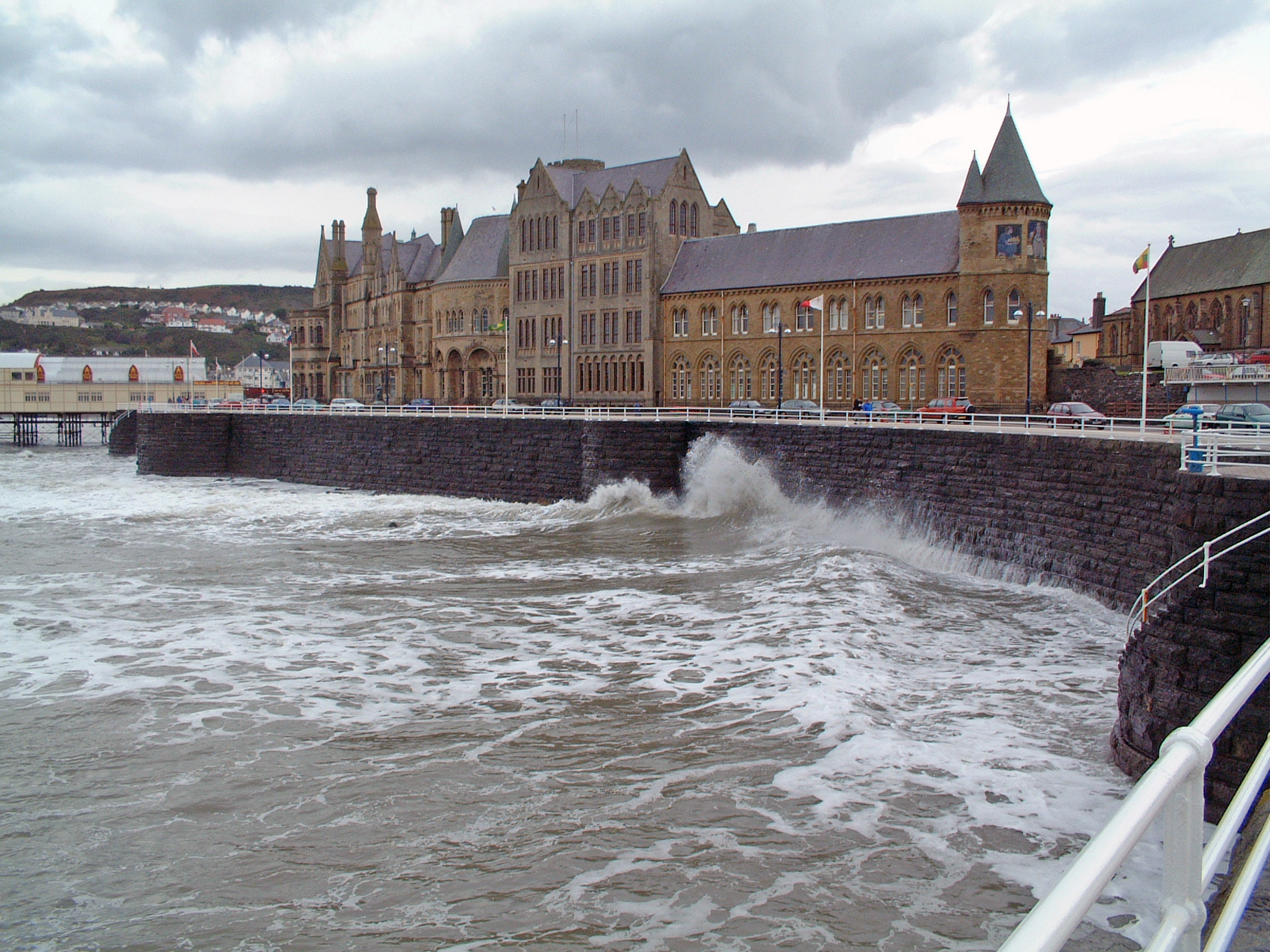
Old College, Aberystwyth

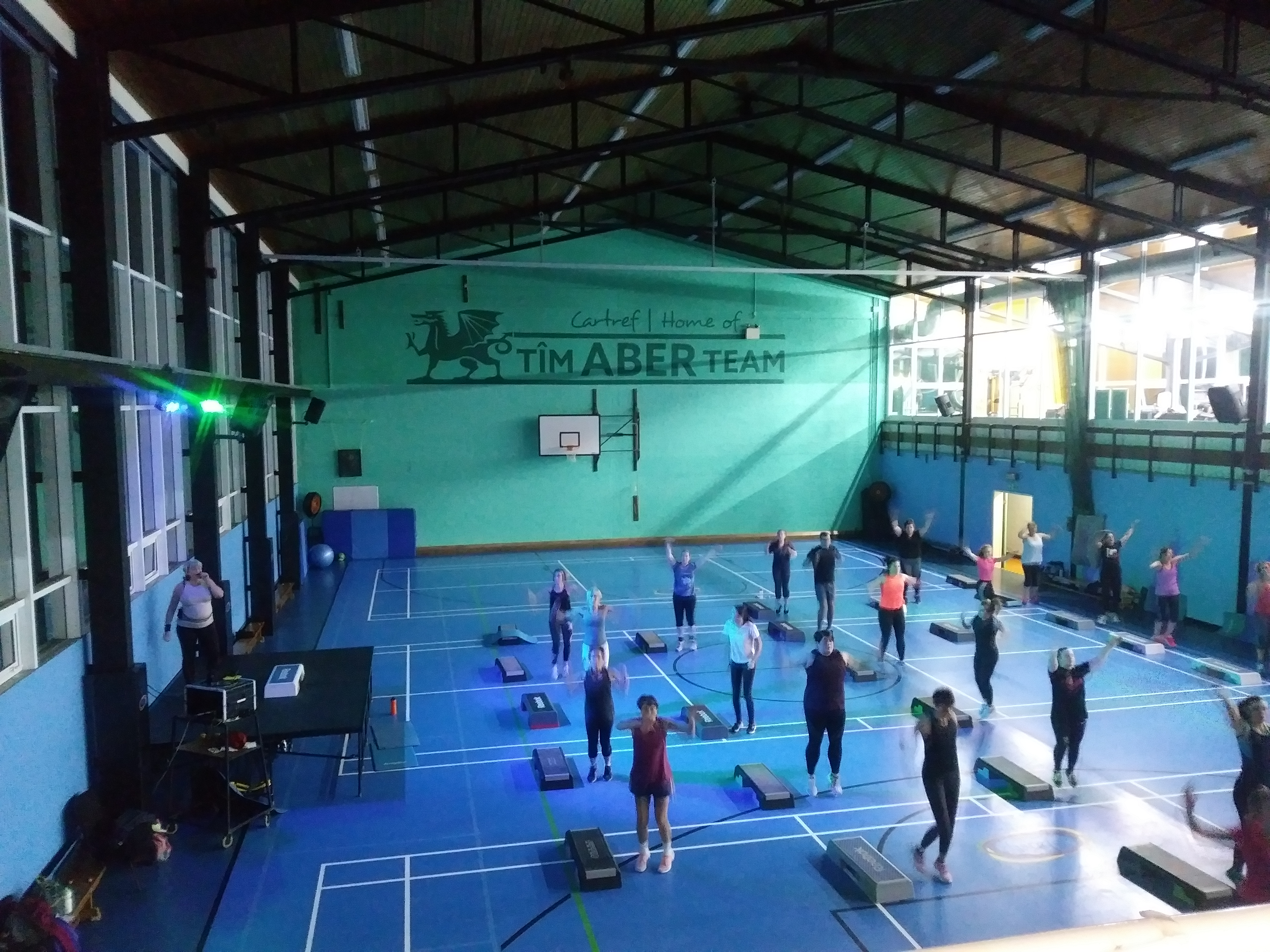
Sports Hall

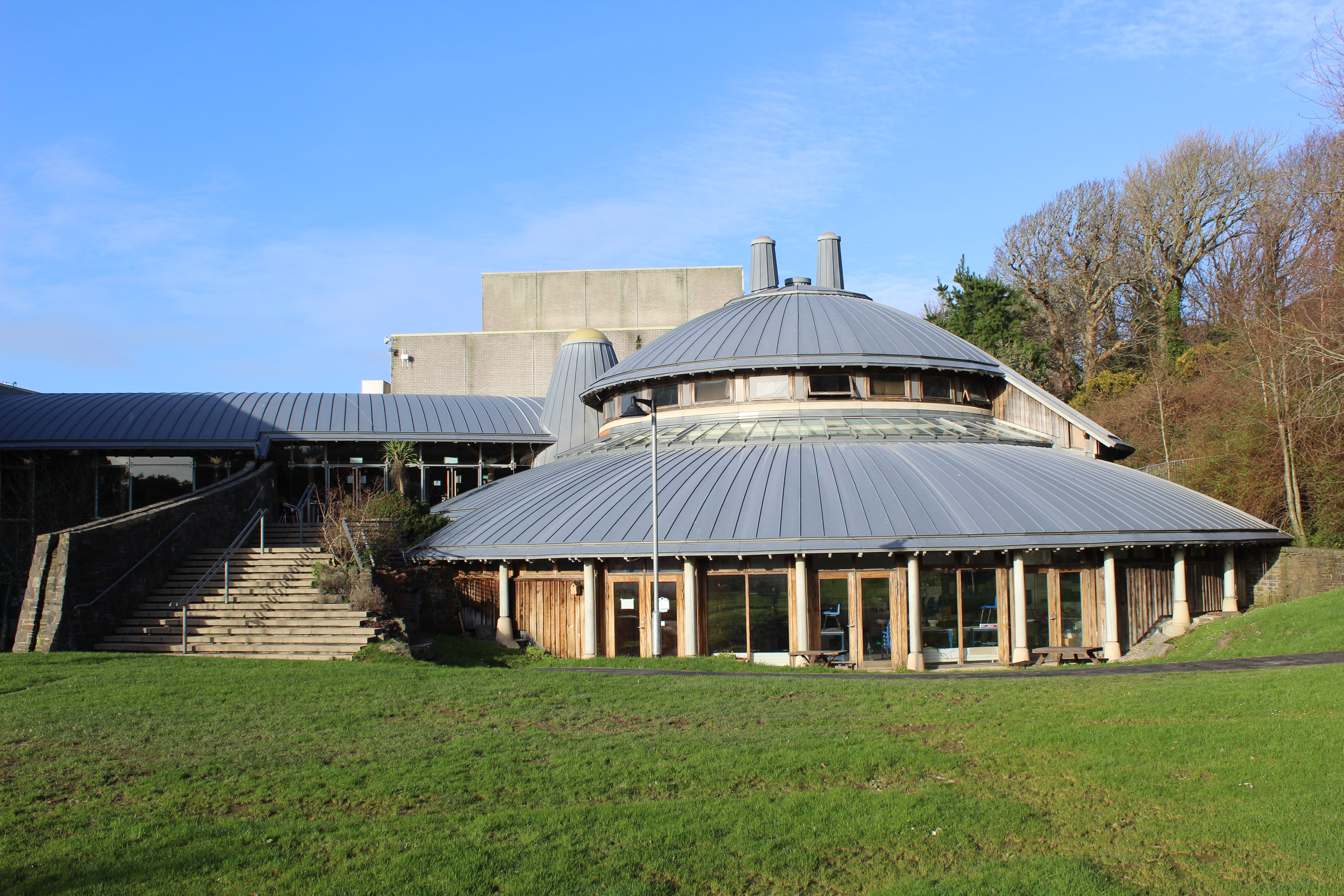
University Studio

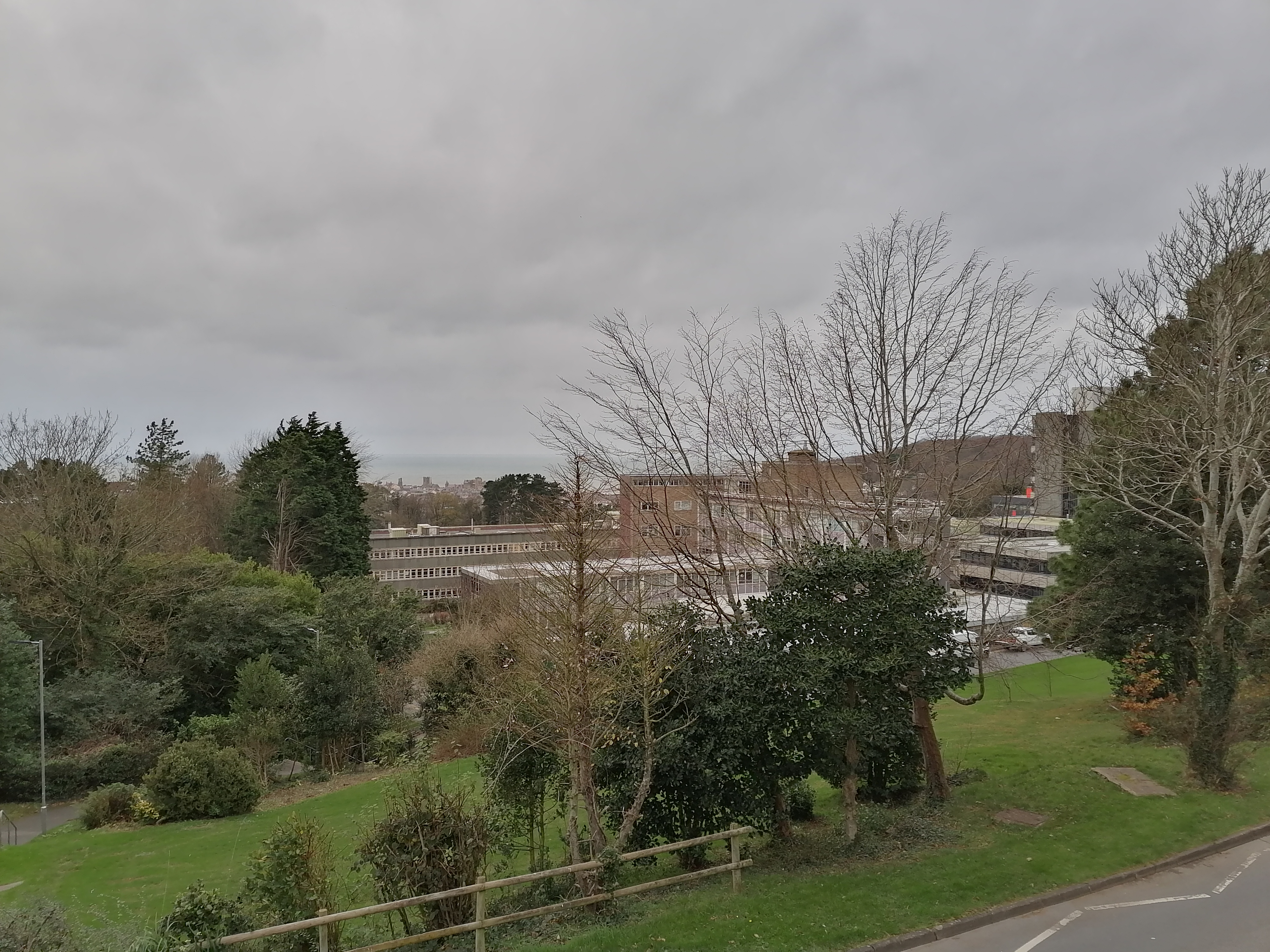
Penglais Campus

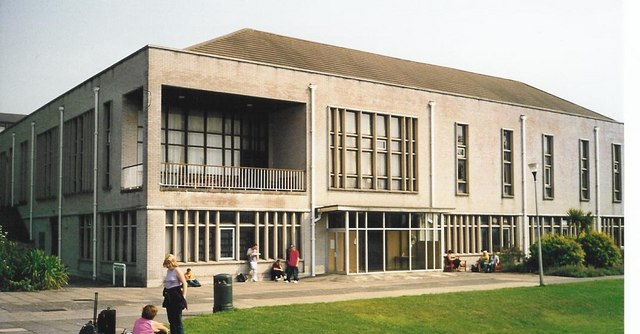
Thomas Parry Library

== See also ==
- Aberystwyth Arts Centre
- Armorial of UK universities
- List of modern universities in Europe (1801–1945)
- List of universities in the United Kingdom
- List of universities in Wales
- Thomas Parry Library
