= Michael MccGwire =

British academic

Michael Kane MccGwire
- Born: Michael; 9 December 1924; Madras, British India
- Died: 26 March 2016 (aged 91); Swanage, Dorset, England
- Spouse: Helen
- Military career
- Allegiance: United Kingdom
- Branch: Royal Navy
- Service years: 1937–1967
- Rank: Commander
- Nickname: Mike
- Units: HMS Rodney; MTB 476; British Defence Intelligence Staff
- Conflicts: World War II
- Awards: Order of the British Empire
- Other work: Specialist in International Relations

Michael Kane MccGwire OBE (9 December 1924 – 26 March 2016) was a British international relations specialist known for his work on Cold War geopolitics and Soviet naval strategy. A former Royal Navy commander, he was Professor of Maritime and Strategic Studies at Dalhousie University in Canada and then a Senior Fellow at the Brookings Institution in Washington DC. He was a well-known critic of nuclear deterrence theory.

== Early life ==
MccGwire grew up in British India, where his father worked for Burmah Oil Company until the 1929–34 depression. The family then moved via Lausanne, Switzerland, to settle in Swanage in England.

He attended the Royal Naval College, Dartmouth, from age 13 and graduated top of his term in 1942, winning the King's Dirk which was presented to him by George VI.

In May that year 17-year-old MccGwire went to sea as a midshipman, by which time half of the Dartmouth term who had graduated a year earlier had already lost their lives. In August he was on HMS Rodney (a battleship famous for its role in the Bismarck sinking) when it took part in the celebrated Malta relief convoy named Operation Pedestal, in which 13 British ships were sunk but the oil tanker SS Ohio made it through.

Having been involved in the North African, Sicilian and then Normandy landings, he then moved to Motor Torpedo Boats, joining MTB 476 of the 30th MTB Flotilla as a First Lieutenant. In the year that they were together, these nine MTBs sank six German vessels and damaged another 12 off the coasts of France, the Netherlands and Belgium. The high speed boats each had three super-charged Merlin engines – the same as used in the Spitfires, running on high octane fuel. MTBs attacked at close quarters at night, with double-skin mahogany hulls that did little to protect the crew or fuel from gunfire. The 30th Flotilla was a close-knit group of men, many of whom stayed in touch until the end of their lives.

At the end of WWII MccGwire was on a British destroyer in the Pacific. Then in 1946-47 he moved to a frigate in the Mediterranean, HMS Whitesand Bay, on the Palestine Patrol, which involved leading boarding parties and taking control of the ships that were illegally carrying Jewish immigrants to Palestine.

In September that year the Royal Navy sent MccGwire to Downing College, Cambridge, to learn Russian along with seven others, including the later defector George Blake. He then returned to sea as a navigator in the Arctic, with the UK's Fisheries Protection around Norway – adjacent to the Soviet Northern Fleet. Then in 1951 MccGwire was loaned to the Australian Navy in a training role.

== Naval intelligence ==
In 1952 MccGwire joined GCHQ to develop naval intelligence on the Soviet Navy, then returned to sea. On the 1956 visit to Britain by Soviet leaders Nikolai Bulganin and Nikita Khrushchev in the lead up to the Suez Crisis, MccGwire was liaison officer on an accompanying Soviet destroyer. In 1956-58 he served as an assistant naval attaché at the British embassy in Moscow, accompanied by his family. Under constant surveillance, he still managed to travel within the USSR and provided various military intelligence before modern satellite data was available. He also started building up his knowledge of Soviet geopolitics.

Promoted to commander on 31 December 1958, he undertook further study in the UK and USA. As a "war planner" he worked in the Supreme Allied Commander Atlantic (SACLANT) in the US. It was his time in the US, working on a multi-national staff, that opened MccGwire's eyes to what one can achieve when unconstrained by deeply ingrained service deference and loyalties. At that point he realised that he wanted to join an international organisation such as the UN.

Before leaving the Royal Navy, MccGwire wanted to head up the Soviet Naval Intelligence Section in the British Defence Intelligence Staff, which he felt needed serious restructuring. The UK was twenty years into the Cold War, yet when he got this job MccGwire was the first head of the section to know the language, to have worked in Russia, to have had experience of another agency and to be well acquainted with the Americans. He reshaped the intelligence effort.

It was for his contribution to British naval intelligence that MccGwire received his OBE in the 1968 New Year Honours. In the words of his successor as Head of the Soviet Naval Intelligence Section, Commander Peter Kimm, "it is my sincere belief that he [MccGwire] has succeeded in contributing something tangible to the security of the country and to the stability of the world in a way which is not given to many of us to do."

== Academic career ==
His colleagues were surprised when MccGwire quit his promising naval career and retired in 1967 aged 42, having just been told that a promotion to Captain was imminent.

His aim was to work in the Third World as a Resident Representative of the United Nations Development Programme, and the first requirement was to have a degree, so he became an undergraduate student in International Politics and Economics at University of Wales, Aberystwyth. While at Aberystwyth he also started and ran the Interstate Journal of International Affairs, wrote a book on the Soviet Navy for the UK's Institute of Strategic Studies, spoke at numerous specialist conferences on this subject, and "in spite of his age, he experienced no difficulty in slipping into college life as a popular, if slightly formidable figure".

A new national quota system thwarted MccGwire's hopes of joining the UN. After a year as a lecturer in the postgraduate Strategic Studies programme at University of Wales, Aberystwyth, in 1970 he became Professor of Maritime and Strategic Studies at Dalhousie University, Canada, a post gained on the basis of his experience and previous publications. He stayed there until 1979, publishing three edited books and playing the leading role in founding the modern study of Soviet naval power.

In 1979 he became a Senior Fellow of the Brookings Institution, a highly respected think-tank in Washington DC, USA. It was here, at a time when the "second Cold War" was underway, that MccGwire wrote Military Objectives in Soviet Foreign Policy. This was a seminal work, as it focused on the Soviet viewpoint and way of thinking, based on extensive analysis of Russian sources of information; whereas Soviet policy was usually analysed in terms of Western interests and vulnerabilities. It was published in January 1987, the same month as Gorbachev's speech to the Communist Party (CPSU) Plenum pushing glasnost and perestroika. The book traces the causes of this monumental reorientation of Soviet policy back to the bankruptcy of established Soviet policies, autonomous new rethinking, and concern about the danger of war, explaining the influence of military requirements on Soviet foreign policy.

In January 1991, a year after the Berlin Wall came down, Brookings published MccGwire's follow-up book Perestroika and Soviet National Security, in which he was able to explain what led to perestroika and the resulting implications for future relations with Russia. Furthermore, whereas so many commentators assumed that perestroika was a direct result of the confrontational policies of the Reagan administration during the 1980s, MccGwire argued that Reagan almost certainly delayed the process.

MccGwire semi-retired in 1990, joining the University of Cambridge as a visiting professor for three years in their Global Security Programme. At Cambridge, he enlarged the terrain of security studies to include economic and social development, and environmental sustainability, while continuing to argue for an end to nuclear deterrents.

In 2006 MccGwire participated in the national debate on whether to replace the UK Trident submarines, debating the matter at the Royal Institute of International Affairs with Michael Quinlan and others, and to which the July 2006 issue of International Affairs was devoted. He continued publishing and commenting on world affairs.

== Understanding Soviet strategy ==
MccGwire was best known for the "MccGwire thesis" – that the Soviet military buildup during the Cold War was largely due to fear of attack, and was thus a defensive measure. He confirms this with extensive empirical analysis of military strategy, and by querying political motivations. He strongly challenged the prevailing Cold War view that Moscow was planning pre-emptive military aggression against the West. This view, he said, had been based on preconceptions, inadequate analysis and poor understanding of Soviet policy-making by Western intelligence, and could have had severe repercussions. His first article in the Naval Review argued against Britain's nuclear deterrent for this reason, and many other articles and two books later followed. For example, he argued that the type of armaments added to Soviet vessels in the 1950s showed that they were added to protect trade routes.

MccGwire developed "objectives analysis" to track changes in military hardware and strategy, based on painstaking analysis of personnel, equipment and geopolitical intentions. Despite this, the British and USA military never fully accepted the "MccGwire thesis" as it became known.

At Brookings, he challenged the Reagan military build-up as provocative and unnecessary. He was a frequent public commentator, including a televised debate against the leading neoconservative Richard Perle. He identified a tipping point in Soviet strategy – from studying Soviet military writings and identifying changes in Soviet deployment of military forces, he identified 1966 as the start of a shift away from the 1950s Soviet assumption that war would inevitably lead to an all-out nuclear exchange. By 1987, the threat of global war became downgraded and armed forces withdrew from Eastern Europe. At this point in time, prevention of global warfare became the primary aim in Moscow, where Gorbachev wanted to defuse tensions and downgrade military spending. In sum, MccGwire believed the end of the Cold War was due to Soviet initiatives rather than the manoeuvring of the Western powers.

== Personal life ==
Michael MccGwire was married to Helen (d. 2020), formerly an occupational therapist and author of a children's storybook. They lived in Dorset and had five children – the writer and adviser to Labour Party figures, Scarlett MccGwire, author/communication consultant Lucinda Neall, Citizens Advice Bureau adviser Katrina Higham, business publisher Rory MccGwire and corporate financier Paddy MccGwire.

MccGwire died on 26 March 2016 at the age of 91.

== Bibliography ==
- MccGwire, M.K. 2016. A Midshipman's Tale: Operation Pedestal Malta Convoy – August 1942. Leaping Boy Publications. ISBN 978-0993594748
- MccGwire, M.K. (ed.) 1973. Soviet Naval developments: capability and context. New York: Praeger. ISBN 978-0275287474
- MccGwire, M.K., K. Booth and J. McDonnell, (eds.) 1975. Soviet Naval policy: objectives and constraints. New York: Praeger. ISBN 978-0275097202
- MccGwire, M.K. & Hardt JP. 1976. Naval power and Soviet oceans policy. Center for foreign Policy Studies, Dalhousie University.
  - Also published in Soviet oceans development, Congressional Research Service, 94th Congress, 2nd session, October 1976, pp. 77–182
- MccGwire, M.K. and J. McDonnell, (eds.) 1977. Soviet Naval influence: domestic and foreign dimensions. New York: Praeger. ISBN 978-0275097202
- MccGwire, Michael (Summer–Fall 1985). "Deterrence: The Problem—Not the Solution". SAIS Review. 5 (2). Johns Hopkins University Press: 105–124. doi:10.1353/sais.1985.0050.
- MccGwire, M.K. 1987. Military Objectives in Soviet Foreign Policy. Washington DC: Brookings Institution Press. ISBN 978-0815755524
- MccGwire, M.K. 1987. The Genesis of Soviet Threat Perceptions. National Council for Soviet and East European Research. ASIN B00071575A
- MccGwire, M.K. 1991. Perestroika and Soviet Military Policy. Washington DC: Brookings Institution Press. ISBN 978-0815755531
- MccGwire, Michael (1994). "Is there a future for nuclear weapons?". International Affairs. 70 (2): 211–228. doi:10.2307/2625231. JSTOR 2625231.
- MccGwire, M.K. 1997. NATO expansion and European security. Volume 37 of London Defence Studies. London: Brasseys.
- MccGwire, Michael (1998). "NATO expansion: 'a policy error of historic importance'". Review of International Studies. 24: 1. doi:10.1017/S0260210598000230. S2CID 145479920.
- MccGwire, Michael (1998). "The Indivisible Continent: Russia, NATO and European Security". In McSweeney, Bill (ed.). Moral Issues in International Affairs - Problems of European Integration. Palgrave Macmillan. doi:10.1007/978-1-349-26464-3. ISBN 978-1-349-26466-7.
- MccGwire, M.K. 2000. Weapons of Mass Destruction – A Confusion of Categories. Evidence to the Select Committee on Foreign Affairs. Foreign Affairs – Eighth Report. 25 July 2000. House of Commons.
- MccGwire, M.K. (2000). "Why Did We Bomb Belgrade?". International Affairs. 76: 1–23. doi:10.1111/1468-2346.00116.
- MccGwire, Michael (2001). "The paradigm that lost its way" (PDF). International Affairs. 77 (4): 4. doi:10.1111/1468-2346.00219.
- MccGwire, Michael (2002). "Shifting the Paradigm". International Affairs. 78 (1): 1–28. doi:10.1111/1468-2346.00236. JSTOR 3095972.
- MccGwire, Michael (2005). "The rise and fall of the NPT: an opportunity for Britain" (PDF). International Affairs. 81 (1): 1–28. doi:10.1111/j.1468-2346.2005.00441.x.
- MccGwire, Michael (2006). "Comfort blanket or weapon of war: what is Trident for?" (PDF). International Affairs. 82 (4): 4. doi:10.1111/j.1468-2346.2006.00559.x.
- MccGwire, Michael (2006). "Nuclear deterrence" (PDF). International Affairs. 82 (4): 4. doi:10.1111/j.1468-2346.2006.00568.x.
- MccGwire, Michael 2007. Rush to Judgement. Evidence to the Select Committee on Defence. The Future of the UK's Strategic Nuclear Deterrent – Ninth Report. 27 February 2007. House of Commons.
