= College of Librarianship Wales =

Information science college in Wales

- Coleg Llyfrgellwyr Cymru
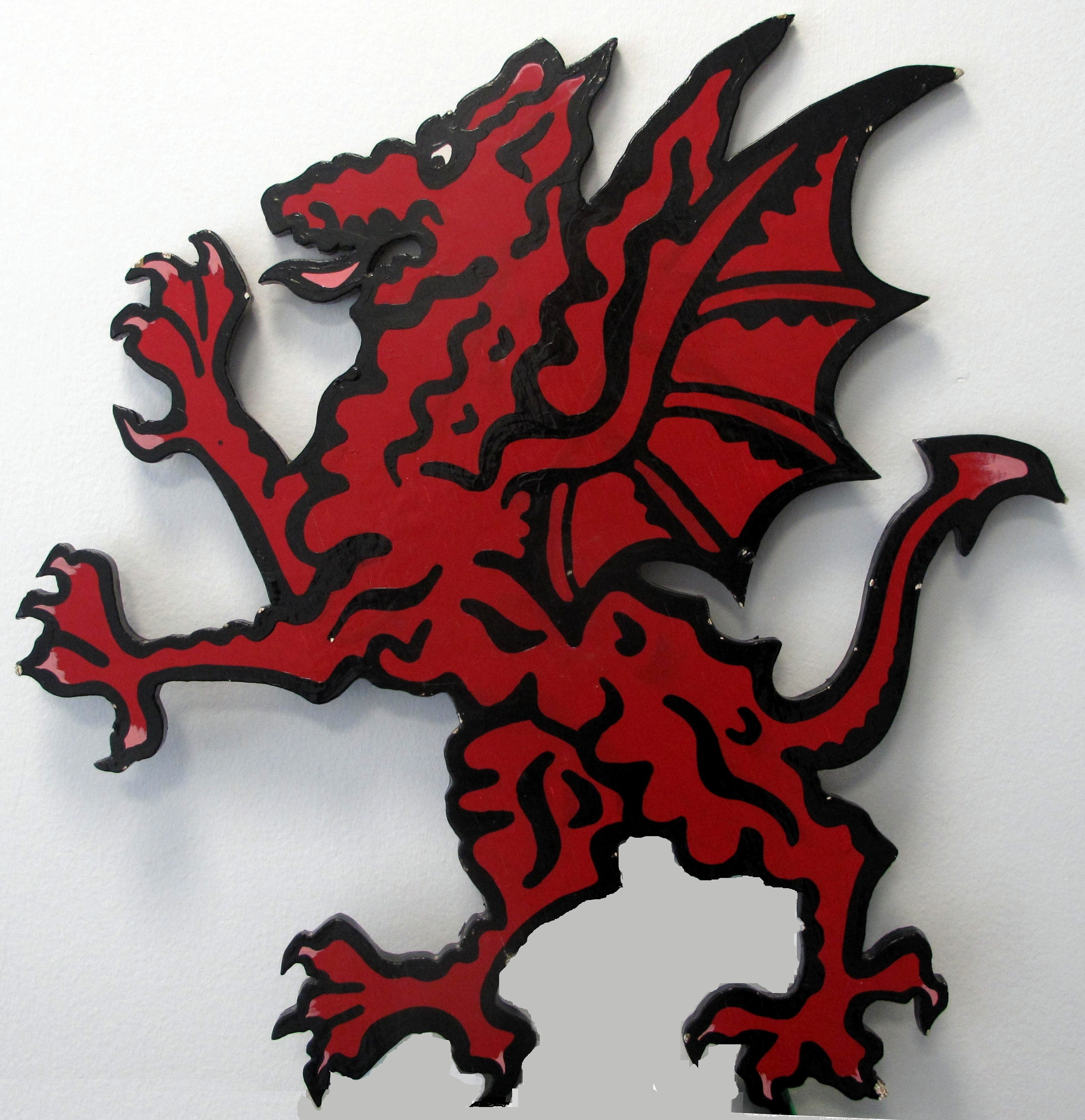
- Type: Public monotechnic
- Active: 1964–1989
- Principal: Frank Hogg O.B.E. (1964–1989)
- Location: Aberystwyth, Wales, United Kingdom
- Campus: Llanbadarn Fawr

The College of Librarianship Wales (Welsh: Coleg Llyfrgellwyr Cymru) (known as CLW) was a monotechnic college specializing in library and information science in Aberystwyth, Wales, between its foundation in 1964 and August 1989, when it was merged with University College of Wales (later Aberystwyth University) to become the Department of Information & Library Studies of that institution. During its twenty-five years of independent existence the college grew to be the largest library school in the UK and one of the largest in Europe. It also gained an international reputation for library education.

== Origins ==
The need for a 'school for library training' in Wales was first suggested by the Royal Commission on University Education in Wales in 1917 and in July of that year a successful summer school was organised by the extramural department of the University College of Wales and the National Library of Wales in Aberystwyth. However, no further progress was made until after the 1950s. In 1957 the Minister of Education appointed a Committee chaired by Sir Sydney Castle Roberts to review the Structure of the Public Library Service in England and Wales. The Report, published in 1959, included a chapter on Wales which identified the need of bi-lingual communities to have staff 'acquainted with the Welsh language and well versed in the history and literature of Wales.' These recommendations were repeated in 1962 in the Bourdillon Report on Standards of public library service in England

Despite opposition from the UK Library Association, and some members of the profession in Wales, but with the support of members of Cardiganshire County Council including Alun R. Edwards, the County Librarian, other Welsh-speaking librarians, and Philip Sewell (a former Head of the School of Librarianship at the Polytechnic of North London), who was then the Senior Library Adviser in the UK government's Department of Education and Science, the Welsh Joint Education Committee decided to proceed with the new college in 1963. Alun Edwards gave a detailed account of the campaign to establish the college in his Welsh-language autobiography, 'Yr Hedyn Mwstard' (The Mustard Seed).

The college was sited at 'Plas Bronpadarn', a Victorian mansion formerly used as a school of nursing at Llanbadarn Fawr, on the outskirts of Aberystwyth. The Principal of the new college was appointed in February 1964 followed by three teaching staff who prepared for the first intake of twelve postgraduate students in the following September.

=== Growth ===
At his interview, the new Principal, Frank Hogg, had convinced the interviewing panel that a small specialist college serving only the needs of libraries in Wales, would not be viable in such a remote location as Aberystwyth. The demand for qualified librarians was growing rapidly and, to be a success, the new college would need to attract students from throughout the British Isles and also overseas. He set out his vision for the future in a paper presented to the General Council of the International Federation of Library Associations and Institutions (IFLA) in 1969. A further fifty students, taking courses leading to the UK Library Association's professional qualification, enrolled in January 1965, together with one more member of staff. Thereafter numbers of staff and students grew steadily until 1968 when there were over 400 students and thirty teaching staff, plus visiting lecturers from Australia and North America. Most of the teaching staff had previously held senior professional posts, and many had experience of working in libraries and/or teaching librarianship overseas. Several went on to become notable experts in specialist fields and/or Heads of other Schools of Librarianship in Britain and overseas.

In 1968, the college introduced a joint-honours undergraduate programme taught in conjunction with the University College of Wales. This was first undergraduate 'honours' (as opposed to a 'general' degree course) in librarianship to be offered by a UK institution. In 1969 CLW offered a University of Wales Postgraduate diploma and, later, a Master of Librarianship degree with a number of specialisms. In due course, the University of Wales approved the college for the registration of candidates for the Degree of Doctor of Philosophy (PhD).

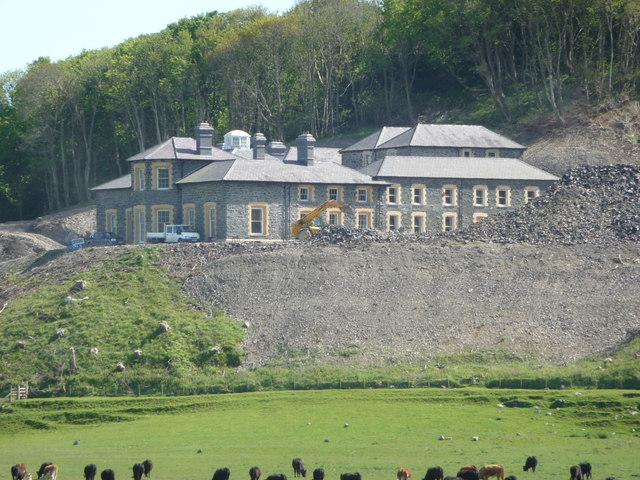
Plas Tanybwlch

The original teaching and student accommodation soon became inadequate. Three temporary wooden classroom buildings were erected to supplement the original Victorian mansion and various other rooms were borrowed for teaching including a chapel vestry, pending the planning and building of a new campus. By 1972 CLW had grown to become the largest school of librarianship in Europe. Students were then housed at the former Grand Hotel in Borth (renamed Pantyfedwen) and a former Regency Mansion/Isolation Hospital, Plas Tanybwlch near Aberystwyth, and students were brought in by bus.

== Llanbadarn Campus ==
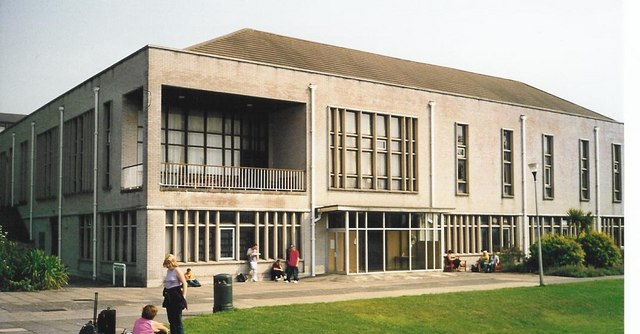
CLW Library

In 1970 a large new library (later known as the Thomas Parry Library) was erected on open country adjacent to Llanbadarn Fawr, intended to be both the college library and a teaching resource. The library aimed 'to collect comprehensively from English-language material, and to select important foreign language materials, especially those in European languages. It was intended to be both an information resource and a teaching laboratory.

The library was followed, in 1973, by the construction of new academic buildings for CLW, Aberystwyth Technical College (later Aberystwyth College of Further Education, now Coleg Ceredigion) and the Welsh Agricultural College with their own library but sharing onsite student accommodation and refectory.

Both the library and the teaching facilities at CLW were equipped with the latest audio visual facilities including a television studio. The purpose-built teaching facilities were later also adapted to include 2 computer laboratories.

== Links to the Welsh speaking and professional communities ==
A major objective of the college was to provide for the needs of the Welsh-speaking communities, appointing staff who spoke Welsh, teaching courses and setting exams in Welsh for those students who requested it. Likewise it sought to maintain the closest possible contact with the library profession in the UK and worldwide. It maintained a staff of Liaison and Training Officers who visited libraries in the UK and overseas to gather information on recent developments to inform teaching, identified suitable and willing hosts for students' fieldwork, arranged periods of fieldwork, managed support for the continuing education programmes, and organised study tours both in the UK and abroad. The library staff included a multi-lingual Translator, who produced regular summaries of key items in the foreign language journals that were received, and also provided full translations when requested by lecturers. All these activities contributed to the development of innovative courses to meet the changing needs of the profession.

== International relations ==
CLW sought to develop an international reputation from the outset. In 1964 the Principal gave a talk on the BBC World Service where he welcomed students from overseas. Academic staff were seconded to work in libraries or library schools in Brazil, Indonesia, Iraq, Jamaica, Jordan, Palestine, Peru and Venezuela. Links with Africa included the Seriatim scheme (eight members of staff to the universities of Ibadan and Ahmadu Bello in Nigeria); short courses on school librarianship in Zambia and Sierra Leone; consultancies in planning national library and documentation schemes in Libya and the Sudan; and the setting up of a library assistants' training programme in Kenya for Unesco. Such international activity was possible at that time as by 1980 there were 45 full-time teaching staff employed at CLW. In 1984/5 the college also began taking on PhD candidates, particularly from overseas.

=== International Graduate Summer School and other programmes ===
The International Graduate Summer School in librarianship (IGSS) at Aberystwyth was held annually between 1973 and 2001, a collaboration between CLW and the Graduate School of Library and Information Sciences at the University of Pittsburgh in the USA. Students studied two courses (from a menu of between five and twelve) during the eight-week summer school, which included a study tour of selected British libraries. Teachers were drawn from CLW staff and visiting lecturers, including colleagues from Pittsburgh, which accredited the courses. During the early 1980s there were between 40 and 55 students participating with 20 to 30 countries represented. Altogether over 1,000 students from 70 countries participated in IGSS.

The college was also noted for offering a regular programme of short courses during the year, presenting new topics, which attracted librarians from Britain and overseas. Several longer courses were arranged for groups of overseas specialists, from Egypt, Iraq, the US, and for groups of the British Council's locally engaged library staff.

Students also benefitted from the college's extensive international contacts. Undergraduates taking Joint Honours degrees in Librarianship and a foreign language fulfilled the requirement to spend a year developing their language skills living in a country where the relevant language is spoken were successfully placed as interns in selected libraries in France, Germany, Italy, and Mexico while one student of Russian was placed in a library for Russian émigrés in Paris.

== Flexible and distance learning ==
In 1985 CLW introduced the first substantial venture into distance learning at a Masters level, with the introduction of a three-year course leading to a master's degree in the Management of library and information services. The continued success of this course led to other master's degree course in Health Information shortly before the college merged to become the Department of Information and Library Studies of University College, Wales in 1989. A range of undergraduate distance and open learning courses were also planned which were introduced shortly after the merger.

== Archive and records management education and training ==
Archives education and training at Aberystwyth began in the mid-1950s with a 'University of Wales Diploma in Palaeography and Archive Administration, which included Palaeography, Diplomatic and the development of Historical Scholarship and Record keeping. This was offered by the History Department. On its formation CLW also offered basic courses in palaeography and diplomatic for librarians but it was not until after the merger that the different offerings were co-ordinated within the new department.

== Merger with the University College of Wales ==
During the early 1980s British government higher education policy moved away from supporting small single-subject mono-technic colleges encouraging those with graduate courses to merge with neighbouring institutions to form new universities. Thus many colleges of agriculture, education and nursing ceased to have an independent existence. The same applied to CLW. Negotiations to effect the merger with the neighbouring University College of Wales, Aberystwyth, began in 1987, facilitated by their long history of joint undergraduate programmes, the approval of CLW's higher degrees by the University of Wales, and the earlier award of the title, University of Wales School of Librarianship and Information Studies, which recognised the close association. The merger took place on 1 August 1989, the college then becoming the Department of Information and Library Studies within a newly established Faculty of Information Studies. 'The merger was not achieved without some soul searching: the college would lose its independence; but it was already becoming obvious that, in the competitive world of higher education, its days as a monotechnic were numbered.'

In October 2023 a volume of reminiscences by former staff was published by the University Department as a prelude to the 60th anniversary of the founding of the college.

== Notable staff and students ==
- Zawiyah Baba, National Librarian in Malaysia.
- Nancy Bond, author
- Dr. Peter Enser, CLW head of department, later Professor and Head, School of Librarianship and Information Science, University of Brighton
- Andrew Green, Librarian, The National Library of Wales
- Dr. Ian M. Johnson, Director of Liaison and Training Services at CLW; later Professor and Head of the School of Information and Media, The Robert Gordon University; and chairman, IFLA Professional Board
- Dr. Isaac Kigongo-Bukenya, Director of the East African School of Library and Information Science, Makerere University
- Dr. J. Andrew Large, CLW Lecturer and later Professor and Head, School of Information Studies, McGill University, Montreal
- Roderick Samson Mabomba, National Librarian of Malawi
- Kevin McGarry, CLW lecturer, later Head of the School of Librarianship, Polytechnic of North London
- Dr. Lionel Madden, CLW lecturer, later Keeper of printed books at The National Library of Wales and then the Librarian 1994–1998.
- Stanley Kamang Nganga, Director, Kenya National Library Service
- Gray Nyali, National Librarian of Malawi.
- Dr. Ekbal Al Othaimeen, Head of Department for Library and Information Science, Public Authority for Applied Education and Training in Kuwait.
- Dr. Paul W.T. Poon, University Librarian, University of Macau
- Michael Ramsden, CLW lecturer, later Professor and Head of Department of Librarianship and Information Services, Royal Melbourne Institute of Technology
- Dr. Najeeb M. al Shorbaji, Director, Department of Knowledge Management, World Health Organisation
- Lucy Tedd, Pioneer in the use of computers in librarianship.
- Dasharath Thapa, National Librarian of Nepal.
- Linda Thomas, Librarian, The National Library of Wales
- Peter G. Underwood, CLW lecturer, later Professor and Head, Centre for Information Literacy, University of Cape Town
- Dr. Wu Jianzhong, Director of Shanghai Library, later University Librarian, University of Macau

== See also ==
- Thomas Parry Library
- List of universities in Wales
