= Esther Pilkington =

British performance artist

Esther Pilkington is a British performance artist and researcher based in Hamburg, Germany. Pilkington, along with Daniel Ladnar, is a founding member of the performance collective Random People. Her work within the practice of walking art considers the role of the documented journey in performance and breaking the predominant character of immediacy in performance.

== Education ==
Pilkington received her PhD from Aberystwyth University, Wales, in 2011, her MA also from Aberystwyth University in Theatre, Film and Media Studies in 2007. She studied English and Theatre, Film and Media Studies at the undergraduate level at Frankfurt University, earning her degree in 2006.

== Selected works ==
- 2011 We Always Arrive In the Theatre on Foot: A walk to the theatre in sixteen steps and eighteen footnotes, Vienna, Austria
- 2011 Vaasa in Luck, Platform, Finland
- 2009 A Long Walk, Aberystwyth to Aldeburgh, UK
- 2005 The Sunny Beach Project, Sunny Beach, Bulgaria; Vienna, Austria and Ipswich, UK
