= Edward Davies Memorial Chemistry Laboratories =

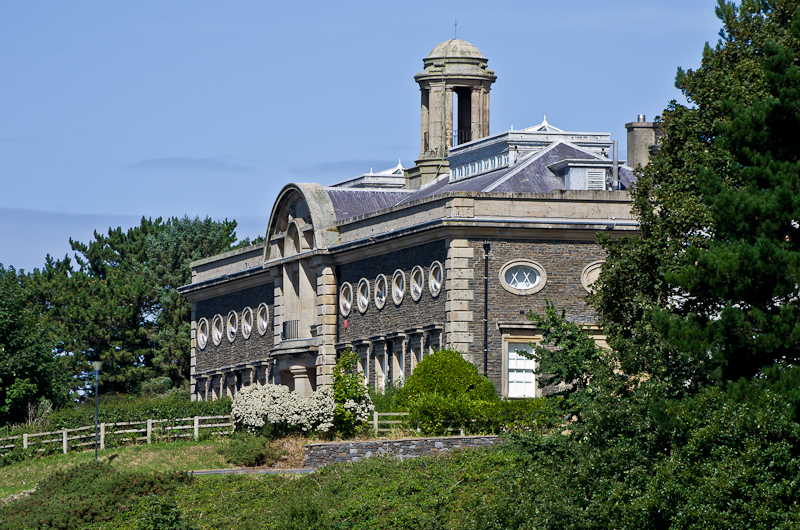

General information
- Location: Aberystwyth, Ceredigion, Wales
- Coordinates: 52.4136°N 4.0775°W
- Year built: 1907
- Owner: Aberystwyth University

Height
- Architectural: Wrenaissance

Technical details
- Floor count: 2

Design and construction
- Architect: Alfred Cross

The Edward Davies Memorial Chemistry Laboratories is a Grade-II* listed Aberystwyth University building, in Buarth Mawr, Aberystwyth, in Wales.

The building was completed in 1907 to a design by the architect Alfred Cross of London. It was commissioned by principal T. F. Roberts as the existing chemistry department had outgrown its former location and was temporarily housed in the Old Assembly Rooms, Laura Place. Funding for the new building was made through a donation from David Davies, Misses Gwendoline, and Margaret Davies in memory of their father, Edward Davies, former treasurer of Aberystwyth University. The land was purchased from W. H. Colby, a member of the University council.

Professor J. J. Sudborough, the head of the department, played a pivotal role in the design of the laboratories based on his extensive travels across Britain and Germany studying the most modern laboratories. The building design is the Wrenaissance style containing a two-story block with a basement to the northwest end, on the outside it has 15 windows snecked rubble front with freestone dressings. The interior has groin vaulted passages, with five-bay tunnel roofed laboratories and an acoustically designed large lecture theatre.

The building is currently home to the Aberystwyth University School of Art.
