= Melissa Chapot =

Luminescence geochronologist

Melissa S. Chapot
- Education: Utah State University (BS) Aberystwyth University (PhD)
- Occupation: luminescence geochronologist

Melissa S. Chapot is a luminescence geochronologist from Murray, Utah, who has worked at Aberystwyth University since 2013. She developed a new technique for optically stimulated luminescence dating that allowed the discovery that prehistoric drawings in Canyonlands National Park weren't as old as previously believed, as well as enabling climate modelling for the time when homo sapiens first migrated out of Africa.

== Early life ==
Chapot attended Cottonwood High School. She earned a degree in geology from Utah State University in 2010 and was that year's science valedictorian. She earned a PhD in geography and Earth science from Aberystwyth University in 2014.

== Research ==
Chapot has held a postdoctoral position as a National Science Foundation Graduate Research Fellow in the Institute of Geography and Earth Sciences at Aberystwyth University since October 2013.

In 2012, Chapot pioneered a technique of surface-exposure dating based on the optically stimulated luminescence bleaching profile beneath a rock surface, which evolves as a function of depth and time. This technique was used to determine the age of a rockfall event that removed part of the Great Gallery rock art in Canyonlands National Park.

In 2014, Melissa Chapot also used this technique to date prehistoric drawings in Horseshoe Canyon in Canyonlands National Park. They were believed to be some of the oldest artefacts of the American Southwest, but Chapot's team showed they were likely made between 1,000 and 2,000 years ago. This means they were likely created during a period when farming populations were moving into the area, which was previously inhabited by hunter-gatherers, and the combination of cultures may have led to the new artistic tradition.

In 2021, Chapot was part of a team that reconstructed the climate in Ethiopia for the last 200,000 years using lake sediments from Lake Chew Bahir in southern Ethiopia. They analysed how often the lake dried up, which allowed them to reconstruct the climate during the time when homo sapiens first migrated out of Africa.
