= Department of Computer Science, Aberystwyth University =

Computer Science department established in 1970

Coordinates: 52.4140°N 4.0647°W

Department of Computer Science
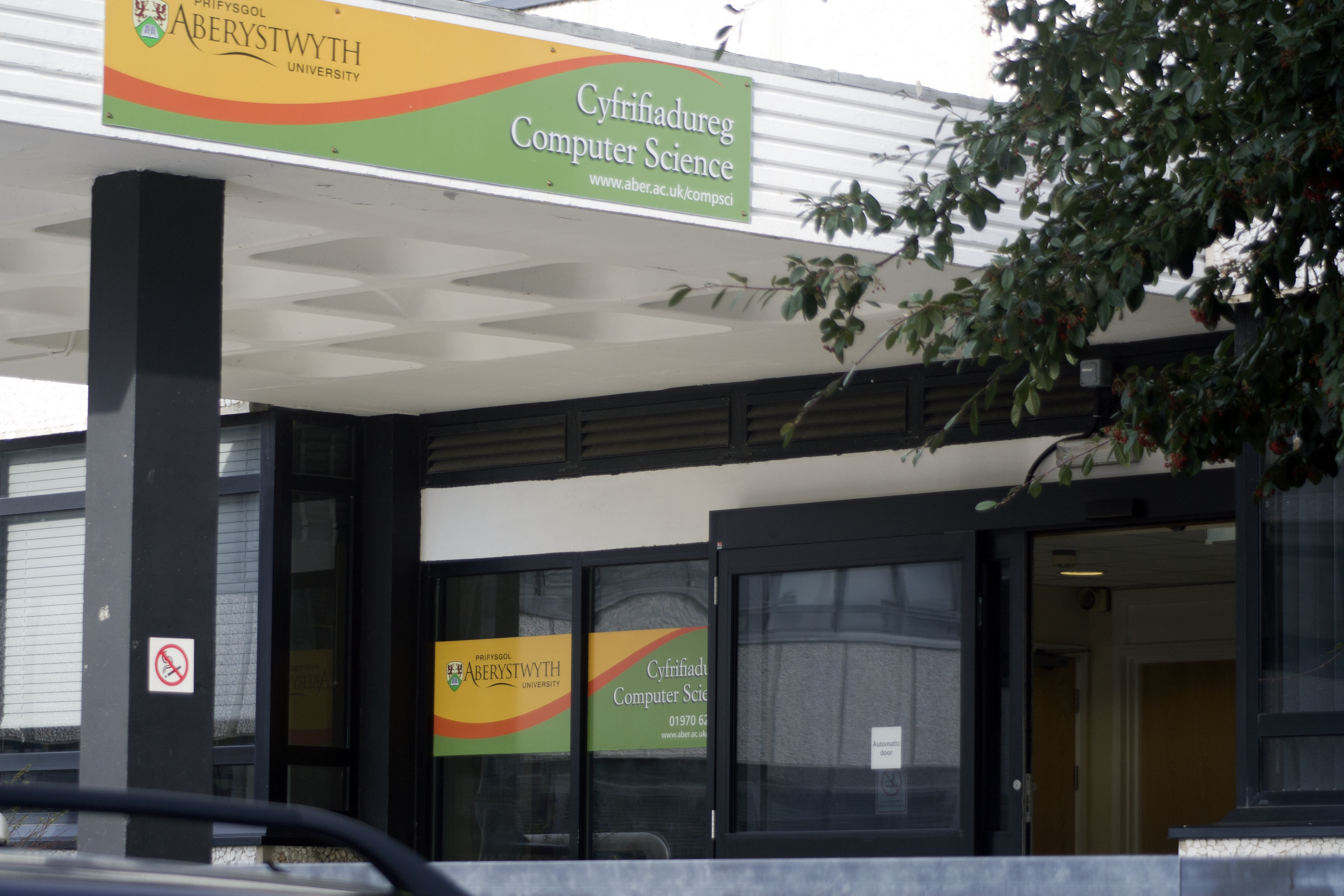
- The Department of Computer Science is based in the Llandinam Building on Penglais Campus
- Established: 1970
- Head of Department: Thomas Jansen
- Students: ~800
- Location: Aberystwyth, Wales
- Campus: Penglais Campus
- Research areas: Intelligent robotics Computer vision Artificial Intelligence; Computational biology Advanced reasoning
- Website: aber.ac.uk/en/cs/

The Department of Computer Science at Aberystwyth University is an academic department established in 1970 that conducts research in robotics, artificial intelligence, and computational biology. Located in the Llandinam Building on the Penglais Campus, the department enrolls approximately 800 students across undergraduate and postgraduate programmes.

The department gained international attention in 2009 when researchers led by Professor Ross King developed "Adam," described in the journal Science as the first machine to independently discover new scientific knowledge. The department has also contributed to space exploration missions through its involvement with the European Space Agency's Beagle 2 and ExoMars programmes.

== History ==
=== Foundation (1970-1980s) ===
The Department of Computer Science was founded in 1970 during the early expansion of computer science education in British universities. Between 1975 and 1980, the department received £3.2 million in research grants from the Science Research Council, indicating early research success.

The 1980s saw significant growth in the department's academic programmes. Student graduation numbers doubled in 1981, and the department awarded its first Master of Engineering in Computing degrees in 1982, followed by its first six PhD degrees later in the decade. The department's computing infrastructure evolved from PDP-11 systems to VAX-11/750 systems by 1984, necessitating the establishment of a Systems Support group.

=== Research recognition (1990s-2000s) ===
The department's research quality received formal recognition in the Research Assessment Exercise 2008, where all submitted research was classified as being of international quality, with 70% deemed either world-leading or internationally excellent. This ranking placed the department among the top 20 computer science departments in the United Kingdom.

== Academic programmes ==
=== Undergraduate education ===
The department offers undergraduate degree programmes accredited by BCS, The Chartered Institute for IT:

- BSc Computer Science
- MComp Computer Science
- BSc Artificial Intelligence and Robotics
- BSc Computer Science with Industrial Year

Students have access to Linux and Mac OS X laboratories and robotic equipment including Arduinos and mobile robots.

=== Postgraduate studies ===
The department maintains approximately 20 postgraduate research students. Programmes include:

- PhD in Computer Science
- MPhil in Computer Science
- Various taught MSc programmes

== Research ==
The department organises research around four groups covering robotics, computer vision, computational biology, and advanced reasoning.

=== Robot Scientist project ===
The department's most internationally recognised research achievement is the Robot Scientist project, initiated in 1999 with funding from the Biotechnology and Biological Sciences Research Council. The project, led by Professor Ross King, developed autonomous laboratory systems capable of conducting scientific experiments without human intervention.

The first system, named "Adam," measures 16.4 feet in length with a height and width of 9.8 feet. In 2009, Adam achieved a significant milestone by becoming the first machine to independently discover new scientific knowledge, identifying twelve genes responsible for catalysing specific reactions in the metabolic pathways of baker's yeast (Saccharomyces cerevisiae). The research was published in the journal Science, with researchers at both Aberystwyth and the University of Cambridge confirming the discoveries through independent manual experiments.

Professor Ross King described Adam's capabilities to the BBC, noting that such systems can "perform the more time-consuming and mundane tasks so human scientists will have more time freed up to do more advanced experiments." The system cost approximately $1 million to construct, not including operational costs, and was capable of performing 1,000 experiments per day.

A second system, "Eve," was subsequently developed for drug discovery research, specifically targeting diseases such as malaria and schistosomiasis. According to a University of Cambridge report, Eve was designed to "speed up the drug discovery process and make it more economical." The project has since moved to the University of Manchester under Professor King's continued leadership.

=== Space robotics research ===
The department has participated in major space exploration missions through its Intelligent Robotics Group. The group contributed to the Beagle 2 mission to Mars and continues involvement with the European Space Agency's ExoMars programme.

The department's contributions to ExoMars include development of hardware components and computer vision systems for the mission's panoramic camera system (PanCam). Researchers have tested prototype instruments in remote locations including Iceland, Utah, and the Atacama Desert.

=== Computer vision and bioinformatics ===
The department conducts research in computer vision applications for plant science, medical imaging, and human behaviour analysis. Dr Hannah Dee, a senior lecturer in the department, has published research on shadow detection, spatial reasoning, and plant image analysis.

The Bioinformatics and Computational Biology Group has developed AberOWL, a framework for ontology-based access to biological data. The system provides reasoning services for bio-ontologies and has been applied to provide automated reasoning-based access to hundreds of ontologies.

== Notable faculty and alumni ==
Dr Hannah Dee, a senior lecturer in the department since 2010, has gained recognition for her advocacy of women in technology. In 2018, she was inducted into the Computer Weekly "Most Influential Women in UK IT" Hall of Fame alongside Chi Onwurah, Sarah Wood, and Sherry Coutu. She was awarded an MBE in 2024 for services to technology and women in the information technology sector. Dee founded the BCSWomen Lovelace Colloquium in 2008, described by Computer Weekly as "the UK's main conference for female undergraduates." Her research focuses on computer vision for analysis of human behaviour, shadow detection and reasoning, and student attitudes to computer science study.

Alan Cox, while studying at the department, co-created AberMUD, which became the first popular internet-based MUD (Multi-User Dungeon). Developed in 1987 by Cox, Richard Acott, Jim Finnis, and Leon Thrane, AberMUD was initially written in the B programming language for a Honeywell mainframe before being ported to C for Unix systems.

Jan Pinkava received both his undergraduate degree and PhD from the department before achieving success in animation. He won the Academy Award for Best Animated Short Film for Geri's Game in 1998 and co-directed the Pixar film Ratatouille.

== Facilities and accreditation ==
The department is housed in the Llandinam Building on the Penglais Campus. Facilities include Linux and Mac OS X laboratories, robotic equipment, and access to Supercomputing Wales facilities.

All degree programmes are accredited by BCS, The Chartered Institute for IT on behalf of the Engineering Council, providing graduates with eligibility for Chartered IT Professional (CITP) status.

== See also ==
- Aberystwyth University
- AberMUD
- Robot Scientist
- ExoMars
- BCS, The Chartered Institute for IT
