= Dorothy Bonarjee =

Poet and lawyer (1894–1983)

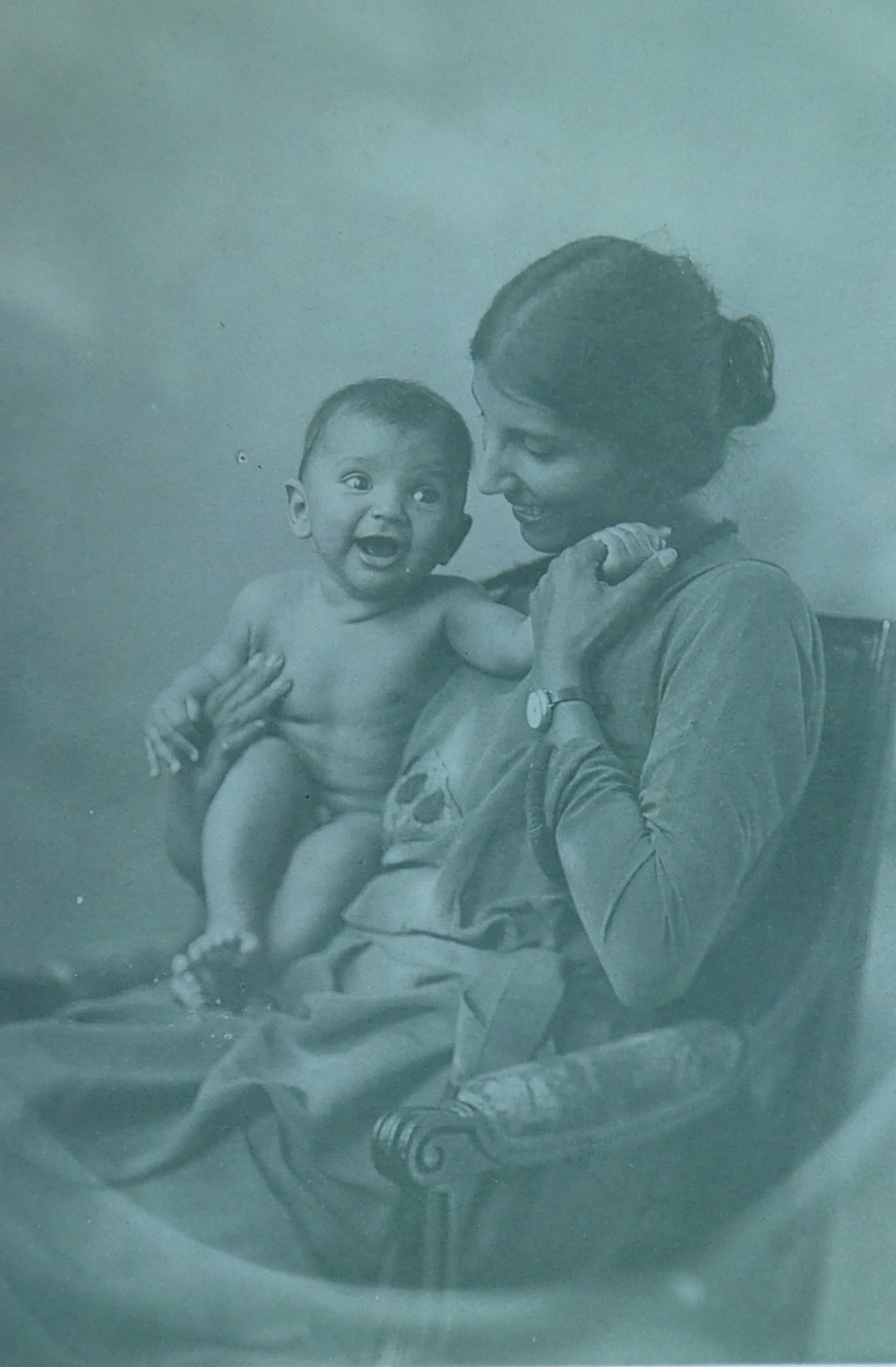
Dororthy Bonarjee with her son Denis - about 1922

Dorothy Noel 'Dorf' Bonarjee (1894–1983) was an Indian poet and artist who was known for being awarded a Bardic chair while a student in Wales and for being the first international female student to be awarded a law degree by University College London. The first collection of her poetry was published in 2023, more than a century after it was written.

== Biography ==
=== Early life ===
Bonarjee was born into a Bengali Christian family in Bareilly in north India in August 1894. Her father was a barrister. Along with her brothers, Bonarjee spent much of her childhood in Dulwich in south London and was largely educated in England.

=== Higher education and poetry ===
In 1912, Bonarjee enrolled to study for a degree in French at the University College of Wales at Aberystwyth. While a student, she published poetry in the college journal The Dragon and in Welsh Outlook. In February 1914, she was awarded the Bardic chair at the college Eisteddfod for verse submitted under a pseudonym. She was the first woman and first non-European to win the college Eisteddfod. Her father, who was present, agreed to demands to address the gathering, thanking those present for the way they had 'received a successful competitor of a different race and country'. Among Bonarjee's papers are more than sixty printed and manuscript poems. Alongside one is a note: 'Written at the age of 22 when a Welsh student after 3 years of secret engagement dropped me because his parents said "She is very beautiful and intelligent but she is Indian."'

A critical article devoted to Bonarjee's poetry commented that she 'doubtless has a bright and hopeful career before her'. Bonarjee went on to University College, London, where, in 1917, she became the first woman internal student to be awarded a law degree (LLB) - though she never practiced law.

=== Later life ===
Bonarjee was a supporter of women's suffrage and in 1919, along with her mother, signed the Indian Women's Franchise Address.

Rather than returning to India to join her parents, in 1921 Bonarjee married the French artist Paul Surtel. They lived in Provence, France. The couple had two children - Denis, who died in infancy, and Claire Aruna - before divorcing. Bonarjee painted particularly still life and landscapes. She died in 1983.

== Memory ==
Dorothy Bonarjee was the subject of a radio documentary, The Hindu Bard, broadcast on the BBC World Service in December 2020 and later adapted for broadcast on BBC Radio Wales. One of her poems, "Immensity" was included in an anthology on women and nature published in 2021.

In February 2023, the first ever collection of Dorothy Bonarjee's poetry was published in Honno's Welsh Women's Classics series, with the title The Hindu Bard and introductions about Bonarjee's life and poetry by Mohini Gupta and Andrew Whitehead. The book was selected by The Guardian as one of its paperbacks of the month in March 2023.
