= Vaughan Southgate =

British parasitologist (born 1944)

Vaughan Robert Southgate OBE DL FZS FRSB PPFLS FRSM
- Born: 13 May 1944 (age 82)
- Occupation: Parasitologist

Vaughan Robert Southgate OBE DL FZS FRSB FLS FRSM (born 13 May 1944) is a parasitologist. He was president of the Linnean Society of London between 2009 and 2012, and was High Sheriff of Bedfordshire in 2007.

== Life ==
Vaughan Robert Southgate was born on 13 May 1944. He was educated at Bedford Modern School, Aberystwyth University (BSc) and Christ's College, Cambridge (PhD).

Southgate worked at the Natural History Museum and was senior principal scientific officer (individual merit), head of the Biomedical Parasitology Division and Director of the World Health Organisation Collaborating Centre and a member of the WHO Expert Committee on parasitic diseases (schistosomiasis). Southgate carried out field studies on schistosomiasis in many countries in Africa, São Tomé and Príncipe, Mauritius. India, Oman and Jordan and has published 221 articles (4,854 citations) in learned journals specialising in parasitology and tropical medicine, and chapters in books. Southgate was editor of the Journal of Natural History 1972–83, and was awarded the C A Wright Memorial Medal in 1990 from the British Society for Parasitology.

Southgate was president of the Linnean Society of London between 2009 and 2012. He has also been a Deputy Lieutenant of Bedfordshire since 2009 and was High Sheriff of Bedfordshire in 2007. He was president of the Bedford Camera Club (2008–2010), the London Society of Old Aberystwythians (2012–2014), the Old Bedford Modernians' Club (2013–2014) and the Bedford Millennium Probus Club (2014–2015). He was a founder member of Biggleswade Ivel Rotary Club in 2000, appointed a Paul Harris Fellow in 2009 and became an honorary member in 2014. Southgate was a trustee of the John Spedan Lewis Foundation (2001-2019), chairman of the trustees of the Friends of Cople Church (2003–2015), and was chairman of the trustees of the Bedford Hospital Charity and Friends in 2020-2025
