= Thomas Parry Library =

Library of Aberystwyth University

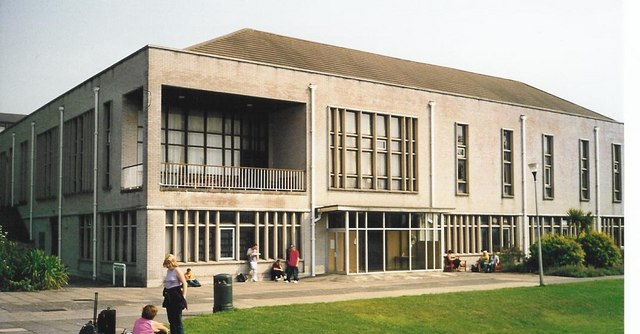
- Thomas Parry Library in 2002
- 52°24′37″N 4°3′15″W
- Location: Llanbadarn Fawr, Aberystwyth, United Kingdom
- Type: Academic library
- Established: June 1970
- Closed: August 10, 2018
- Architect: G. R. Bruce
- Branch of: Aberystwyth University

Collection
- Items collected: Books, journals, newspapers, magazines, sound and music recordings, 16mm films, video cassettes
- Size: 950 video cassettes, 250 film cans (as of closure)
- Legal deposit: No

Access and use
- Access requirements: Students and staff of Aberystwyth University
- Population served: Department of Information Studies, Department of Law and Criminology, School of Management & Business (2013–2018)
- Members: Students and staff of Aberystwyth University

Other information
- Website: aber.ac.uk/en/is/library-services/tp/ (archived)

The Thomas Parry Library was an academic library at Aberystwyth University in Wales, serving the Department of Information Studies, Department of Law and Criminology, and the School of Management & Business. It operated from June 1970 until August 2018.

== History ==
=== Early Years (1970–1989) ===
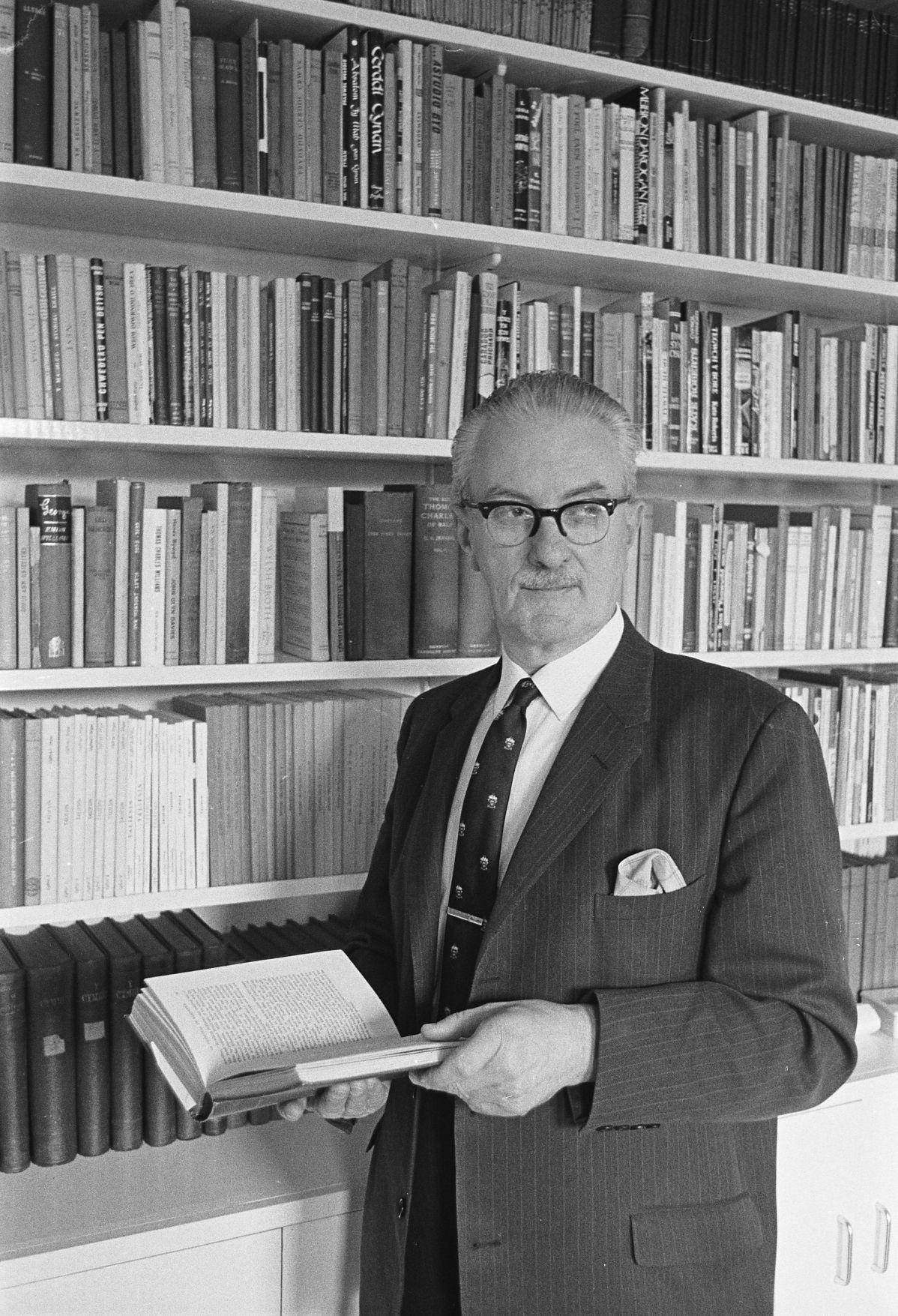
Professor Thomas Parry upon his appointment as Principal of University College of Wales, Aberystwyth in 1958. The library was named in his honour in 1995.

The library was originally built to serve the College of Librarianship Wales (CLW), which was established in 1964 as the first library school in Wales. The college grew rapidly under the leadership of founding Principal Professor Frank N. Hogg OBE, who served from 1964-89 and oversaw its development into the largest library school in the UK and one of the largest in Europe.

=== University Integration (1989–2018) ===
When the College of Librarianship Wales merged with Aberystwyth University in August 1989, the library became part of the university's library service system. In August 1995, the library was renamed the Thomas Parry Library in honour of Sir Thomas Parry, a distinguished Welsh scholar who had served as Librarian of the National Library of Wales from 1953 to 1958.

== Collections and Services ==
=== Audiovisual Collections ===
The library maintained significant audiovisual resources, including 16mm films collected since the College's inception in 1964. The collection comprised 950 video cassettes and 250 film cans covering documentary, news and current affairs, science and education, librarianship and information science, and agriculture and countryside matters. The earliest film in the collection dated from 1922.

=== Academic Resources ===
The library was described as "a leading library for our discipline" in the field of Information and Library Studies. It housed textbooks, journals, and learning support materials including electronic resources to support the Department of Information Studies' campus-based and distance learning courses.

== Building and Infrastructure ==
The library was located at the Llanbadarn Centre in the Thomas Parry building. In 2014–15, the university standardised internal signage in the Thomas Parry Library to improve navigation and access to services and facilities.

== Closure and Legacy ==
The library closed on 10 August 2018 as part of the university's estates strategy to consolidate all full-time undergraduate classroom teaching on the Penglais Campus. The move began on 13 August 2018 and was completed within five days, with all collections and services transferred to the Hugh Owen Library.

Following its closure as a library, the Thomas Parry Library building was repurposed as a mass COVID-19 vaccination centre by Hywel Dda University Health Board. The centre began operations in January 2021, initially serving health and care staff before opening to the general public. The facility provided COVID-19 vaccinations to residents of Carmarthenshire, Ceredigion, and Pembrokeshire.

The Royal Commission on the Ancient and Historical Monuments of Wales recognised the Thomas Parry Library as "a state-of-the-art academic library" that opened in 1972, highlighting its role in the influential College of Librarianship Wales that was crucial in training professional librarians through graduate and post-graduate courses.

== Archives ==
Administrative papers and records of the College of Librarianship Wales, including materials related to the Thomas Parry Library, are held at Aberystwyth University Archives. The collection spans 1956-1990 and includes administrative papers, teaching materials, library papers, and records of staff and student societies.
