= Stanley Kamang Nganga =

Kenyan librarian

Stanley Kamanga Nganga born December 19, 1951, is a prominent Kenyan librarian and former Director of the Kenya National Library Service. He is notable for his research and efforts in bringing library services to rural areas of Kenya.

== Education ==
University of Nairobi (1972–75)

College of Librarianship, Aberystwyth, Wales (1976–1977)

== Career ==
Chief Librarian, Kenya Polytechnic, Nairobi,(1977–82)

Head, Library and Archival Studies, Kenya Polytechnic,(1982–84)

AG Deputy Principal, Kenya Polytechnic, (1984–86)

Director, Kenya National Library Service,(1989–2000)

== Publications ==
“A Critique on Information Systems and Services in Kenya-The Role of the Kenya Library Services in their Coordination,” Coordination of Information Systems and Services in Kenya, 1990, pp. 10–20

“Training Needs for Library Personnel in Educational Institutions in Kenya,” Continuing Education Programmes for Library and Information Personnel in Educational Institutions, 1995, pp. 118–126

“The Role of Libraries and Information Centres in Rural Development,” Information for Sustainable Development in the 21st Century, 1998, pp. 6–14
