= System sales =

System sales is a term used in the franchising industry. System sales represents the total sales of all outlets that use a brand, or that use multiple brands owned by one franchisor. It is always higher than the franchisor's revenue.

For example, say an average "Fast Eats" restaurant has annual revenue of US$1 million. Fast Eats Inc operates 1,000 Fast Eats restaurants directly and franchises another 3,000 outlets, taking a 20% cut of sales. Fast Eats Inc's reported revenue is $1.6 billion (1,000 × $1million from direct operations and 20% × 3,000 × $1 million from franchised outlets). But Fast Eats' system revenue is $4 billion (4,000 × $1 million).

System sales provides a useful way of assessing the growth of a franchised brand. A franchise operator can easily increase its reported revenue by taking more outlets under direct management, but that may not be the best option for the profitability of the business, and the increase in accounting revenue it generates may give a misleading impression of the rate of growth of the underlying business, if system sales are not taken into account.
