= Domino's Pizza Group =

UK master franchise of Domino's Pizza

Domino's Pizza Group plc
- Formerly: Doublemeasure Public Limited Company (5–15 October 1999); Domino's Pizza plc (October–November 1999); Domino's Pizza UK & IRL plc (1999–2012)
- Type: Public
- Traded as: LSE: DOM; FTSE 250 component
- Industry: Foodservice
- Founded: 1985; 41 years ago
- Headquarters: Milton Keynes, England, United Kingdom
- Number of locations: 1,381
- Area served: United Kingdom, Ireland
- Key people: Ian Bull (Chairman); Nicola Frampton (Chief executive officer)
- Products: Pizza; Sides; Desserts; Drinks
- Services: Master franchisee for Domino's branches in the United Kingdom, Ireland.
- Revenue: ▲£685.4 million (2025)
- Operating income: ▼£111.2 million (2025)
- Net income: ▼£59.0 million (2025)
- Website: corporate.dominos.co.uk

Domino's Pizza Group plc is a United Kingdom-based master franchise of international fast food pizza delivery chain Domino's. The company is listed on the London Stock Exchange and is a constituent of the FTSE 250 Index.

== History ==
The Domino's Pizza company was founded in 1960, by American entrepreneur Tom Monaghan as a single pizzeria in Ypsilanti, Michigan. The first store in the UK opened in Luton in 1985.

The master franchise for the British Isles was sold off by the parent company in 1993 to Domino's Pizza Group, a subsidiary of the International Franchise Systems holding company controlled by sibling investors Colin and Gerry Halpern. The company partially floated its shares on London's Alternative Investment Market in October 1999, by which time it had expanded to a network of almost 200 branches (of which all but eight were franchises). Certain investors such as Colin Halpern and property entrepreneur Nigel Wray retained significant stakes at this time.

The company opened its 400th store in Wadsley Bridge, Sheffield in November 2005. The 500th store opened in the end of 2007, in Hatfield, with the 600th following in December 2009, in High Holborn, Central London, being opened by Stavros Flatley. The Domino's share transferred from AIM to the main market of the London Stock Exchange in May 2008, and was promptly added to the FTSE 250 Index at the next quarterly review the following month. The 2000th European Domino's store was opened at Kier Park, in Hemel Hempstead in August 2013.

=== Germany ===
In April 2011, the group acquired a majority stake in the exclusive master franchise to own, operate and franchise Domino's Pizza stores in Germany. As of April 2021 there are over 330 stores in Germany.

The first German store opened in Berlin in 2010, and today, the company has five in the city. Other store locations also include Bonn and Aachen. The Domino's store in Cologne was one of three stores opening on that day, which were recognised as the 5,000th international store for Domino's Pizza Inc. The other two 5,000th stores were Rio de Janeiro, Brazil & Penang, Malaysia.

=== Switzerland ===
On 24 September 2012, Domino's Pizza Group acquired Domino's Pizza Switzerland AG, which provides the company with the exclusive right to operate and franchise Domino's stores in Switzerland, Liechtenstein and Luxembourg, as well as an option to acquire the Master Franchise Agreement for Austria. In 2021 the loss-making chain was sold for CHF 300,000 to an undisclosed buyer.

=== Latest history ===
In November 2025, the company's UK chief executive, Andrew Rennie, left the company with immediate effect. Rennie was replaced on an interim basis by COO Nicola Frampton who was later confirmed as the permanent CEO in March 2026.

== Operations ==
Prospective franchisees are required to pay approximately £280,000 to the parent company for the right to operate their own Domino's Pizza outlet. Once established, the group also provides other services for the franchisee including production of dough, sourcing and delivery of ingredients and training. The group also delivers IT, advertising and other administrative services on behalf of the franchisees.

Domino's has a central commissary system which makes dough, and supplies this and other ingredients to each store.

== Financial information ==
Domino's Pizza Group financial results.
Year to December^{^{1}}	System sales (£m)	Revenue (£ million)	EBIT (£m)	Earnings per share (p)
2025	1,595.6	685.4	111.2	17.6
2024	1,571.5	664.5	125.0	20.4
2023	1,572.0	679.8	116.2	18.4
2022	1,456.0	600.3	109.8	18.8
2021	1,499.1	560.8	119.9	17.1
2020	1,348.4	505.1	109.0	8.9
2019	1,210.9	508.3	105.3	2.8
2018	1,259.5	534.3	56.0	10.3
2017	1,179.6	474.6	81.3	13.8
2016	1,004.2	360.6	83.0	13.1
2015	877.2	316.8	73.2	29.9
2014	766.6	294.4	55.2	25.9
2013	668.8	268.9	47.9	10.7
2012	598.6	240.5	47.20	19.04
2011	530.6	209.9	42.64	16.65
2010	485.3	188.1	38.46	15.4
2009	406.9	155.0	30.99	21.45
2008	350.8	136.0	24.48	10.12
2007	296.3	114.9	20.21	8.38
2006	240.1	95.0	13.7	6.2
2005	200.7	81.7	10.4	5.1
2004	174.3	74.2	9.1	4.1
2003	142.3	61.6	6.0	2.8

^1 - Accounts to 2005 prepared according to United Kingdom Generally Accepted Accounting Principles. Accounts from 2006 onwards prepared according to International Financial Reporting Standards.

=== Shareholder structure ===
Many of the principal shareholders of Domino's Pizza Group are individuals connected with the company including long term investor and non-executive director Nigel Wray and former owner Colin Halpern. A total of 0.35% of shares are held in treasury stock by the Domino's Pizza Group Employee Benefit Trust.

== Products ==
In May 2012, Domino's signed up to Out of Home Calorie Labelling Pledge, which is part of the Government's Responsibility Deal. This saw the introduction of calorie information on Domino's main ordering website. In June 2012, the company signed up to the Hospitality and Food Service Agreement managed by WRAP (Waste and Resources Action Programme), the Government funded organisation responsible for improving waste reduction and recycling.

In November 2012, Domino's launched a gluten free pizza in its stores in the United Kingdom and Republic of Ireland, accredited by Coeliac UK.

In September 2025, Domino's introduced the sub-brand The 'Chick N' Dip' to satisfy the growing demand for chicken in the UK.

=== Labour issues ===
In September 2007, the current affairs programme Newsnight reported on the alleged poor treatment of Domino's Pizza employees.

Some of the deductions made by the company included the costs of insuring the cars used to deliver pizzas, and one worker was deducted all her wages for the first week of work because the franchise designated it "unpaid training". Then CEO, Stephen Hemsley, denied that such issues were systemic within the franchise network.

Domino's Pizza Group's operations in the United Kingdom extensively use zero-hour contracts.

=== Sponsorship ===
Domino's Pizza was the sponsor of episodes of The Simpsons on Sky1 between 1998 and 2008. In July 2007, Ofcom introduced a ban on fast food advertising, around programmes aimed at under sixteens. This resulted in the advertising being dropped for a brief period, but later resumed. In April 2008, when reintroduced, the advertising subsequently became more brand focused, rather than promoting specific products. In October 2008, the company announced that its sponsorship of the show would come to an end.

Domino's has also sponsored the second, third and fourth series of Britain's Got Talent. Orders received on the night of the 2008 Final were around a third above those of a typical Saturday night. In June 2011, Domino's sponsored Red or Black?, a new game show presented by Ant and Dec. In December 2016 it became the sponsor of The Voice UK.

== Digital strategy ==
In August 2007, Domino's became the first pizza company in the United Kingdom to launch a service that allows customers to order pizzas by text message. In May 2010, it launched a widget for social network sites, allowing any user with a blog, Facebook or MySpace account to promote Domino's Pizza, and receive a cash reward every time an order is placed through the widget.

Domino's iPhone ordering app was introduced in January 2011, and took £1 million in its first three months.

In June 2011, the company launched Android and iPad apps. A Windows Phone 7 app followed in 2012. The company also makes use of discount codes. Domino's growth in e-commerce continues with 61.5% of all United Kingdom delivered sales (2012: 56.1% of United Kingdom delivered sales) coming via the internet. Sales taken through all online platforms were up in 2013, by 28.2% to £338.0m (2012: £263.7m) and, of this, 30.9% was taken through a mobile device (2012: 19.7%).

In 2024, Domino's generated more than 85% of U.S. retail sales through digital channels, primarily via online ordering platforms and mobile applications. The company has continued to invest in digital capabilities, including the redesign of its e-commerce platforms completed in 2024, with plans to expand these updated platforms across its U.S. system in 2025.
