= List of Old Cranleighans =

Former pupils of Cranleigh School

The following are notable Old Cranleighans, who are former pupils of Cranleigh School (founded in 1865).

== Politicians ==
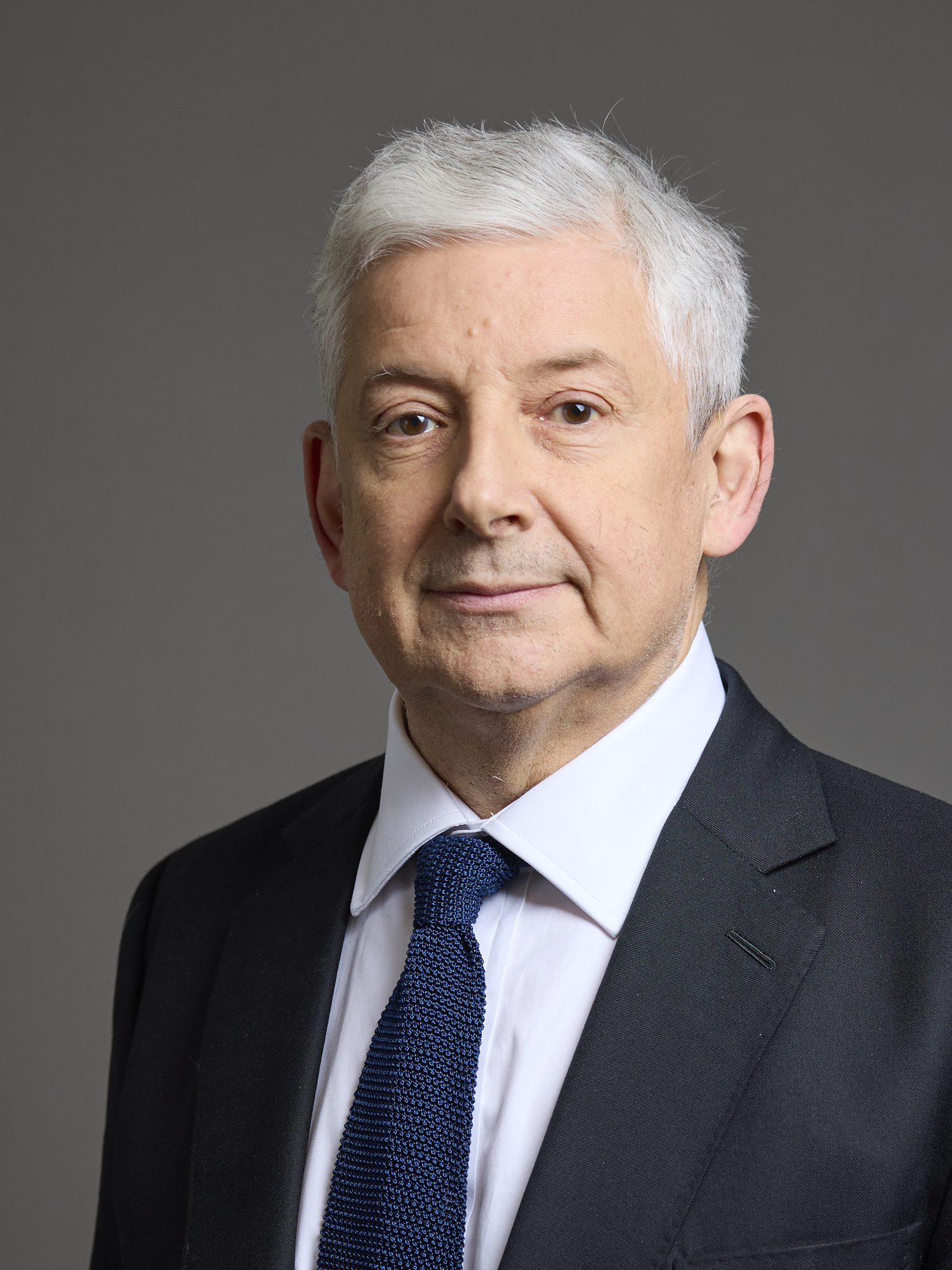
Paul Goodman, Baron Goodman of Wycombe

- James Couchman (1942–2023) MP for Gillingham (1983–1997)
- Paul Goodman (1959–) MP for Wycombe (2001–2010)
- Adam Holloway (1965–) MP for Gravesham (2005–2024)
- Hudson Kearley (1856–1934) MP for Devonport (1892–1910) and member of the House of Lords (1910–1934)
- Robert Taylor (1932–1981) MP for Croydon North West (1970–1981)

== Civil servants and diplomats ==
- Geoffrey Chipperfield (1933–2024) civil servant
- Francis Floud (1875–1965) civil servant and diplomat
- Shabtai Rosenne (1917–2010) professor of international law and Israeli diplomat
- Peter Wakefield (1922–2011) diplomat and art fund director

== Academics ==
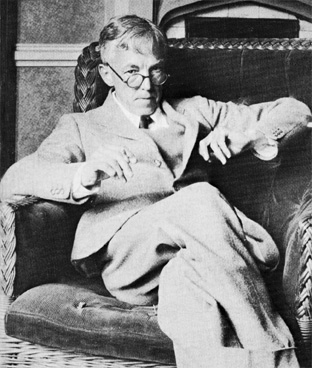
G. H. Hardy

- Tony Gibson (1914–2001) psychologist and anarchist
- Richard Goodchild (1918–1968) archaeologist
- G. H. Hardy (1877–1947) mathematician
- Mike O'Hara (1933–2014) geologist
- Eddie Obeng (1959–) organisational theorist
- Eric Vernon Watson (1914–1999) bryologist
- Leonard Charles Wooldridge (1857–1889) physiologist

== Medical and veterinary ==
- Vincent Warren Low (1867–1942) surgeon
- Harry Steele-Bodger (1896–1952) veterinary surgeon
- Ian Tait (1926–2013) general practitioner and medical historian

== Business leaders ==
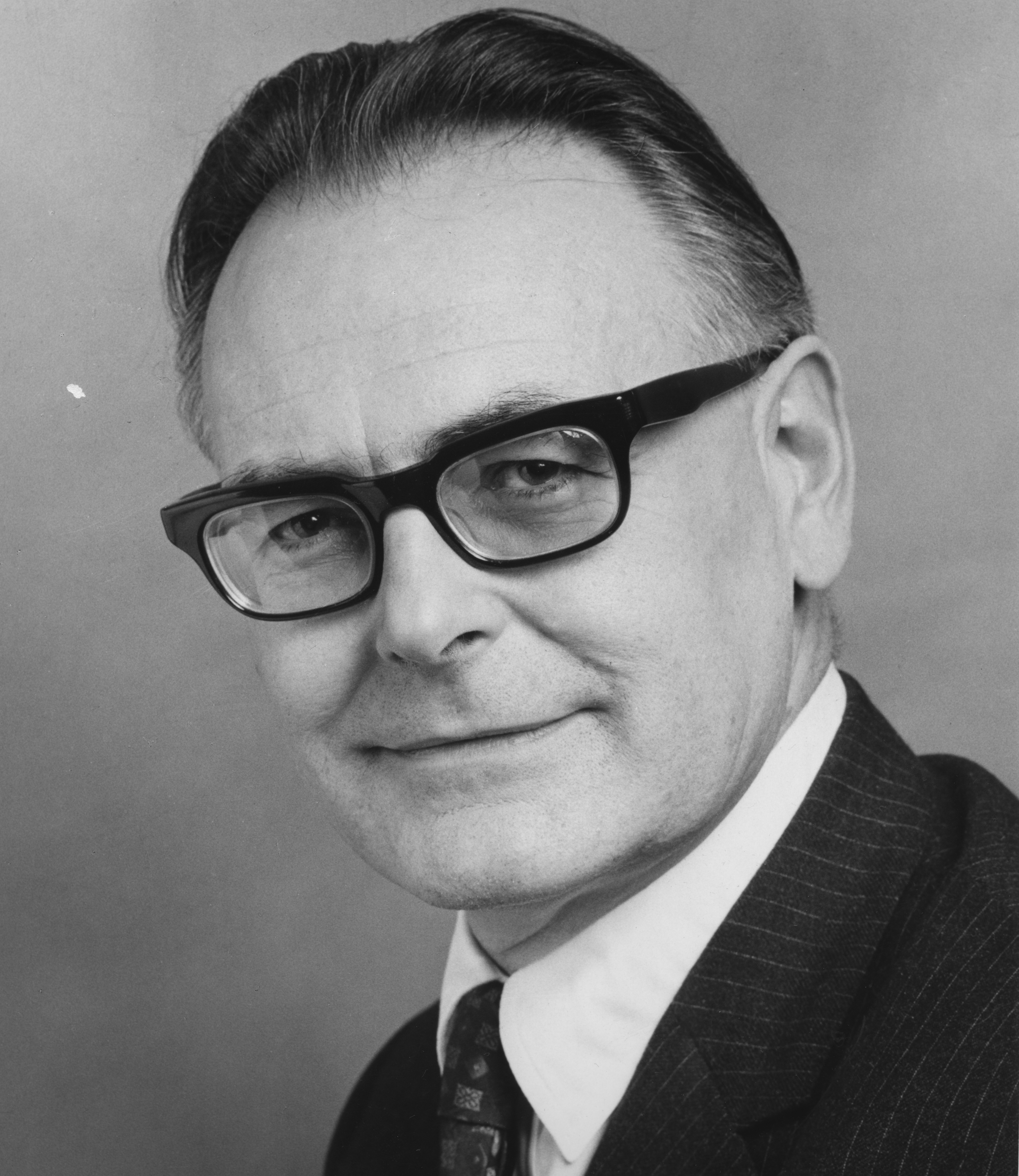
Gordon Brunton

- Lance Batchelor (1964–) submarine warfare officer, and CEO of Domino's Pizza Group and Tesco Mobile
- Gordon Brunton (1921–2017) publisher, racehorse breeder and owner
- Michael Caborn-Waterfield (1930–2016) founder of Ann Summers
- George May (1871–1946) Secretary of the Prudential Assurance Company and government adviser
- Hamish Ogston (1948–) founder of CPP Group
- Nitin Passi (1982–) founder of Misguided

== Journalists, writers and broadcasters ==
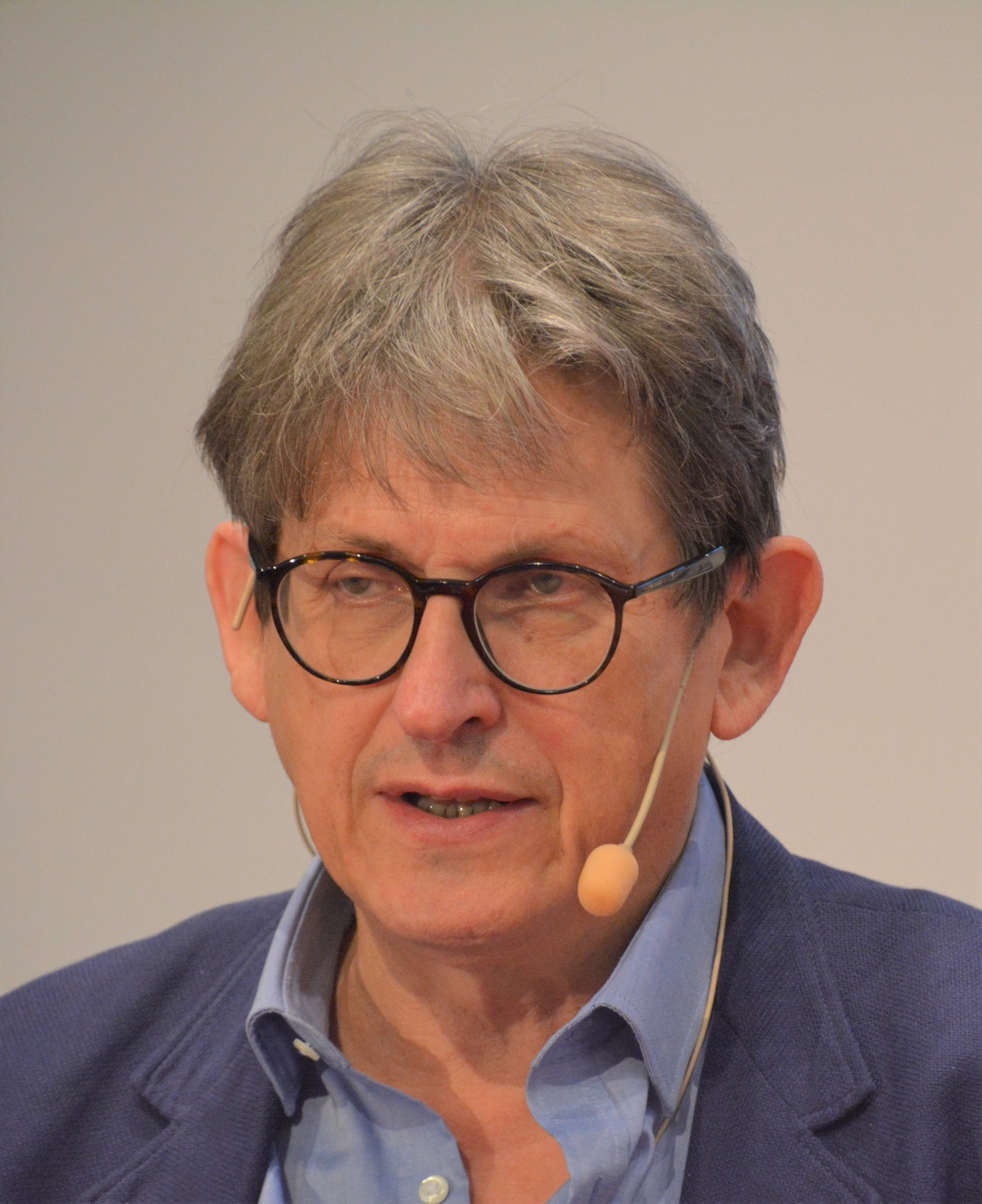
Alan Rusbridger

- Olivia Attwood (1991–) influencer and television presenter
- Stacy Aumonier (1877–1928) writer and stage performer
- Peter Emerson (1856–1936) photographer and writer
- Fred Emney (1900–1980) actor and comedian
- Bernard Gutteridge (1916–1985) poet
- James Harpur (1956–) writer and poet
- Patrick Marber (1964–) comedian and screenwriter
- Andrew Roberts (1963–) journalist and popular historian
- Alan Rusbridger (1953–) editor of The Guardian and Principal of Lady Margaret Hall, Oxford
- Chris Russo (1959–) American broadcaster
- E. W. Swanton (1907–2000) journalist and cricket commentator
- Christopher Trace (1933–1992) television and radio presenter

== Judges and lawyers ==
- Nicholas Blake (1949–) High Court judge
- David Calcutt (1930–2004) barrister
- Paul Coleridge (1949–) High Court judge
- Frank Ereaut (1919–1998) Bailiff of Jersey

== Military personnel ==
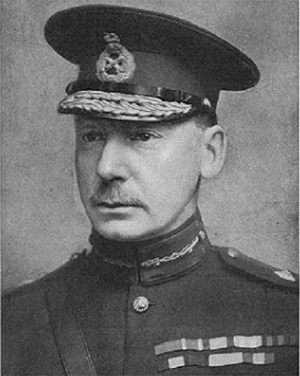
Charles Townshend

- Frederick Sadleir Brereton (1872–1957) medical officer in the British Army and children's author
- George Kitching (1910–1999) officer in the Canadian Army
- James Gordon Legge (1863–1947) officer in the Australian Army
- Edwin Moon (1886–1920) officer in the Royal Air Force and aviation pioneer
- Nigel Morgan (1954–2018) officer in the British Army and security consultant
- Lechmere Thomas (1897–1981) officer in the British Army
- Charles Townshend (1861–1924) officer in the British Army
- Clive Wallis (1913–1981) British Army officer and Ireland rugby player
- John Worrall (1911–1988) officer in the Royal Air Force

== Clerics and theologians ==
- Anthony Caesar (1924–2018) Anglican priest and organist
- Harry Williams (1919–2006) priest and theologian

== Artists, actors and musicians ==
=== Art ===
- Frank Cadogan Cowper (1877–1958) painter
- Nicholas Dimbleby (1946–2024) sculptor

=== Music ===
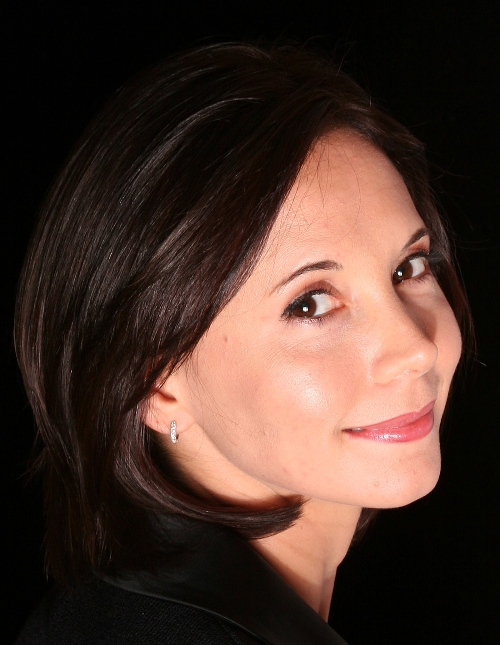
Sarah Ioannides

- Derek Bourgeois (1941–2017) composer and conductor
- Jolyon Brettingham Smith (1949–2008) composer, musician and broadcaster
- E. C. Cawte (1932–2019) musician and folklorist
- Christopher Dearnley (1930–2000) organist
- Christopher Herrick (1942–) concert organist
- Sarah Ioannides (1972–) orchestral conductor
- Oliver Kraus (1970–) composer and music producer
- Paul Miles-Kingston (1972–) singer and teacher
- Richard Seal (1935–2022) organist and choirmaster
- James William Webb-Jones (1904–1965) choral educator

=== Theatre, film and television ===
- William Abney (1941–1997) actor
- Tony Anholt (1921–2002) actor
- Michael Cochrane (1947–) actor
- Vivian Cox (1915–2009) writer, film producer and teacher at Cranleigh School
- Eric Fellner (1959–) film producer
- Val May (1927–2012) theatre director
- Julia Ormond (1965–) actor
- Christian Roberts (1944–2022) actor and restauranteur

== Sportspeople ==
=== Cricket ===
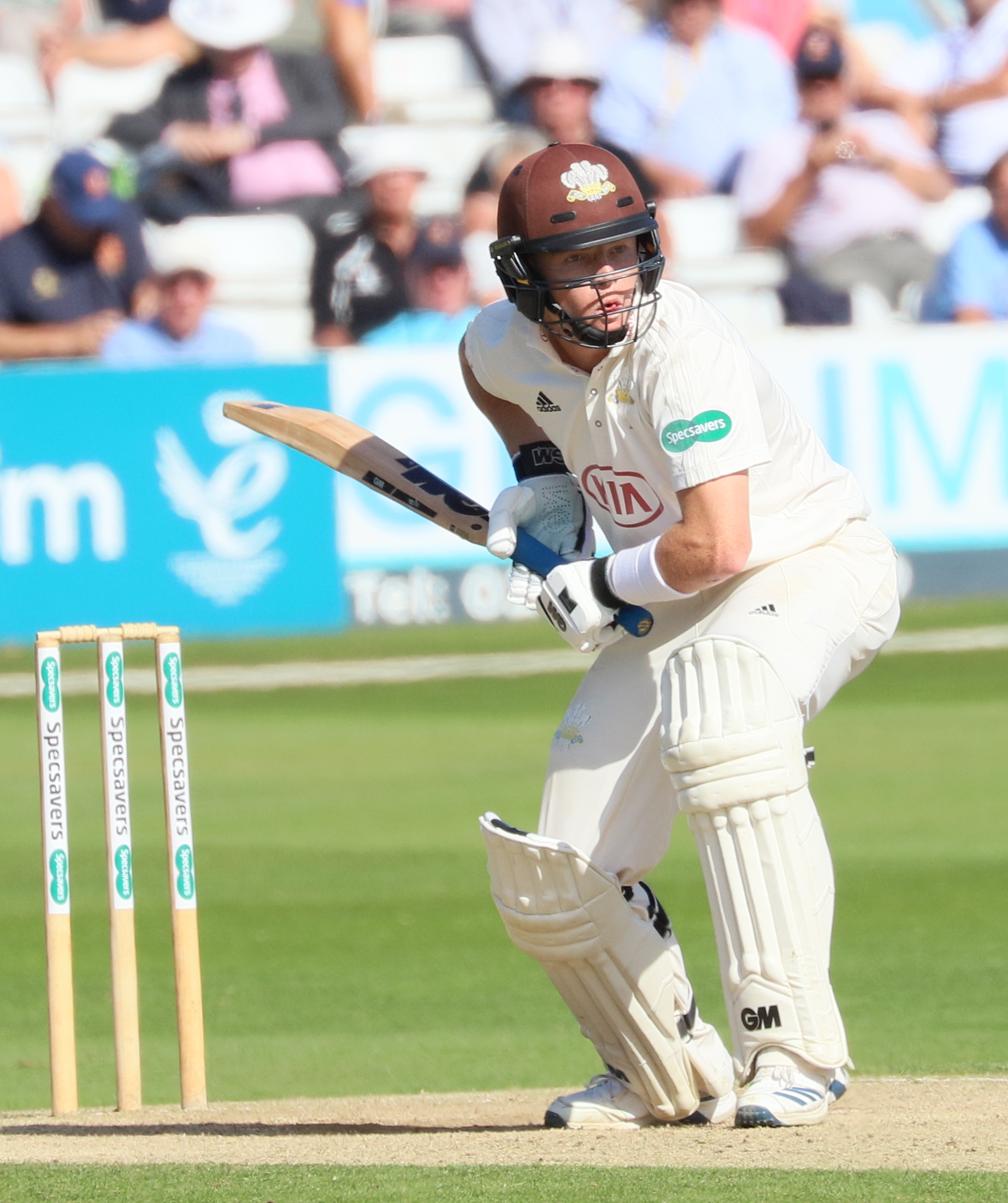
Ollie Pope

- Duncan Allan (1991–)
- Michael Burgess (1994–)
- Lewis Bedford (1999–)
- Harry Calder (1901–1995)
- John Carmichael (1858–1914)
- Will Howard (1981–)
- Tom Lawes (2002–)
- Yousef Majid (2003–)
- Stuart Meaker (1989–)
- Nigel Paul (1933–2022)
- Ollie Pope (1998–)
- Vezey Raffety (1906–1991)
- Seren Waters (1990–)

=== Rugby Union ===
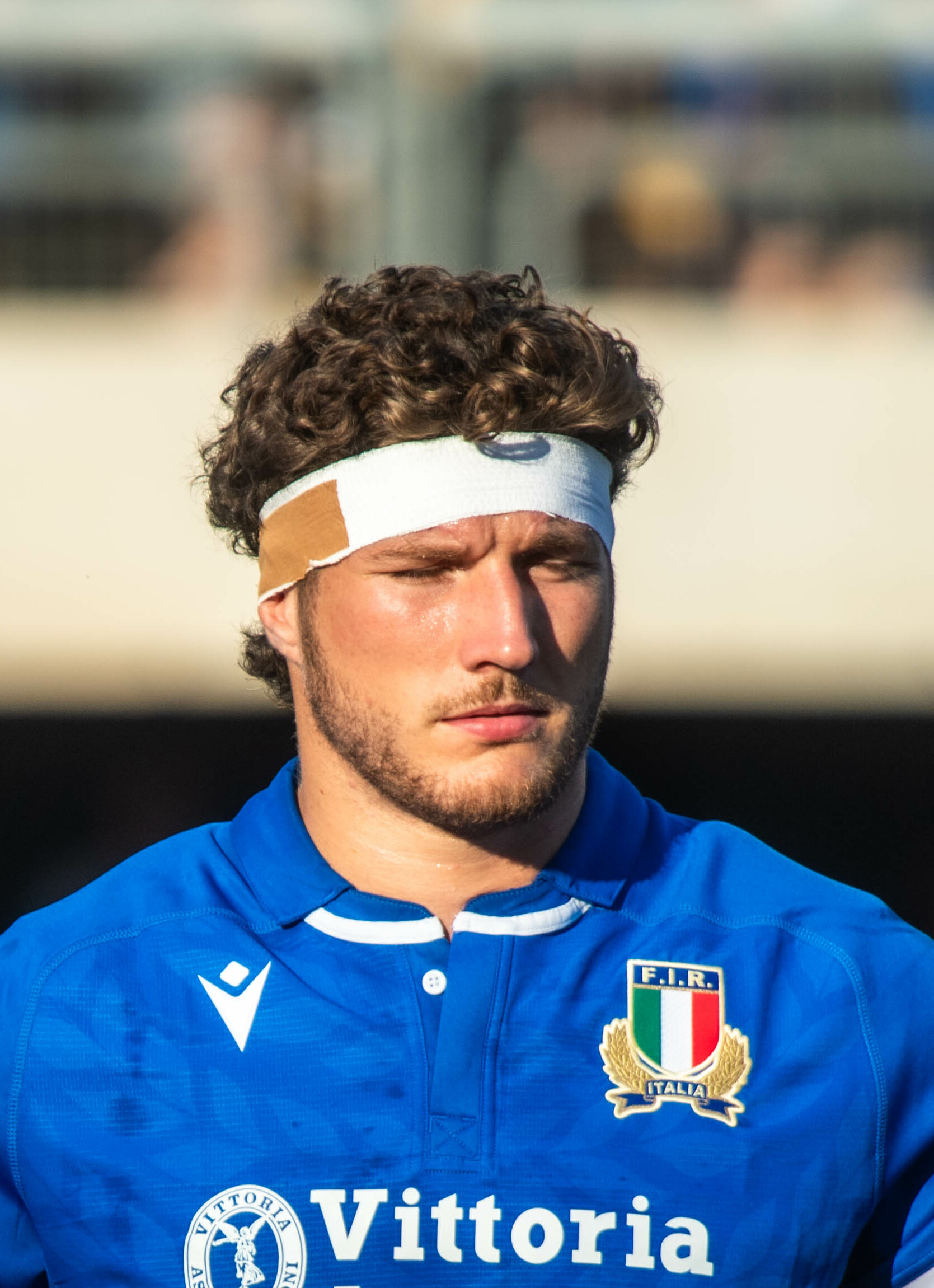
Dino Lamb

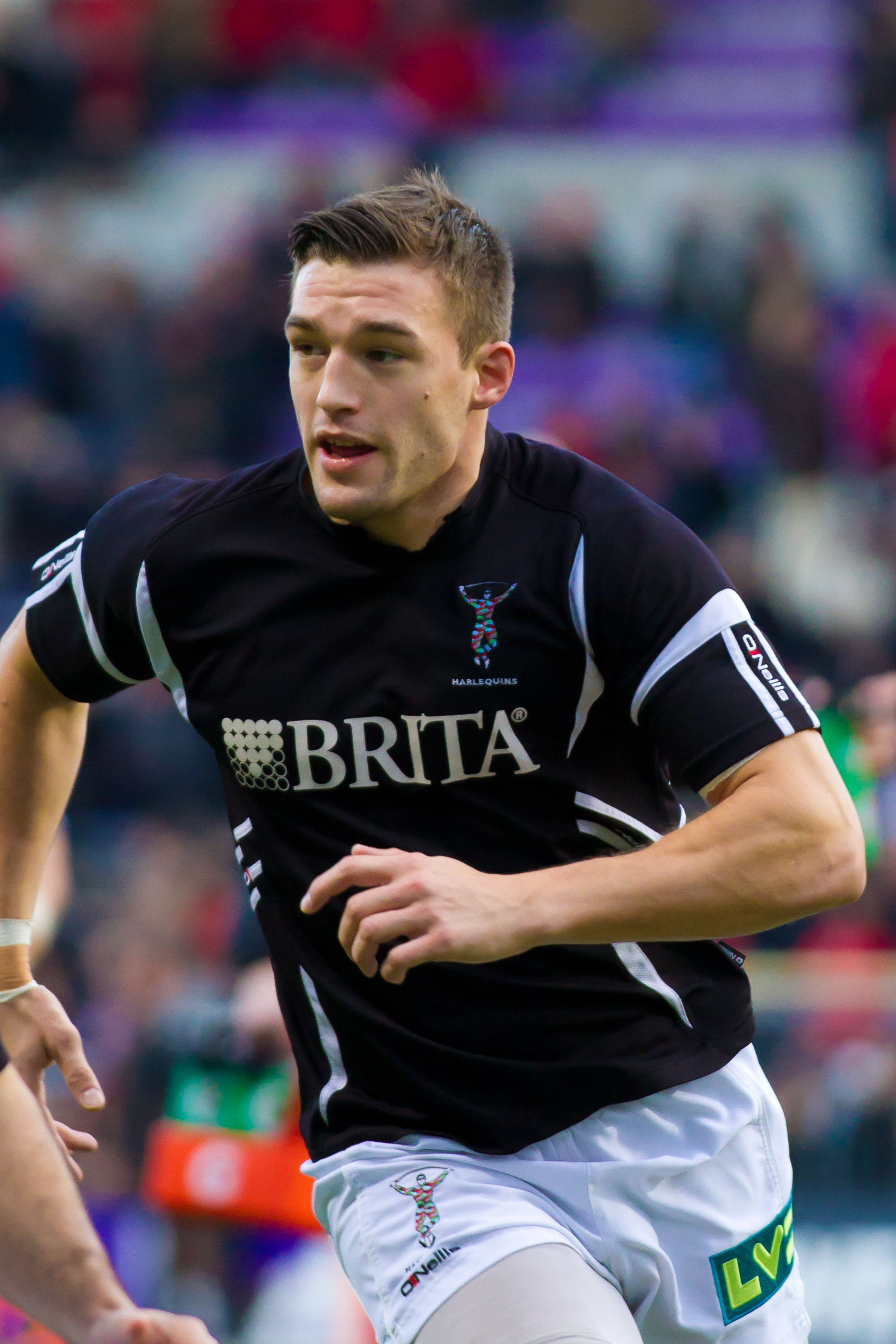
Seb Stegmann

- Sammy Arnold (1996–)
- Greg Bateman (1989–)
- Oscar Beard (2001–)
- Jeff Clements (1932–1986)
- Will Collier (1991–)
- Stanley Couchman (1913–1992)
- Harry Elrington (1993–)
- Hayden Hyde (2000–)
- Jake Jacob (1902–1996)
- Alan Key (1908–1989)
- Dino Lamb (1998–)
- Maurice McCanlis (1906–1991) rugby union and cricket
- Jeff Reynolds (1916–1996)
- Seb Stegmann (1989–)
- Henry Taylor (1994–)
- Hugh Tizard (2000–)
- Will Trenholm (2001–)

=== Field hockey ===
- Will Calnan (1996–)
- James Gall (1995–)
- Isabelle Petter (2000–)
- David Westcott (1975–)
- Don Williams (1966–)

=== Other sports ===
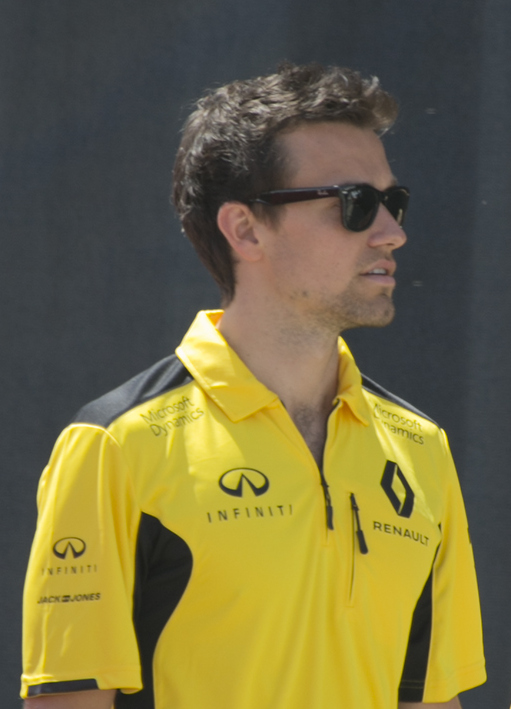
Jolyon Palmer

- Will Barnicoat (2003–) long-distance runner
- Frank Dove (1897–1957) boxer
- Jack Jarvis (1887–1958) jockey and racehorse trainer
- John Mark (1925–1991) athlete who lit the Olympic cauldron at the 1948 Summer Olympics
- Jolyon Palmer (1991–) Formula 1 driver
- Will Palmer (1997–) Formula 4 racing driver
- Gregory Slade (2002–) wheelchair tennis player

== Other ==
- Olivia Arben (1997–) model
- Peter Conder (1919–1993) ornithologist and conservationist
- Charles Secrett (1954–) environmentalist and head of Friends of the Earth in England, Wales and Northern Ireland

== See also ==
- Old Cranleighan Hockey Club
- Old Cranleighans F.C.
