= Vezey =

Vezey is a name. Notable people with this name include:

== Surname ==
- Ed Vezey, survivor of USS Oklahoma (BB-37)
- Pamela Vezey (1932–1992), English actress

== Given name ==
- Vezey Raffety (1906–1991), English cricket player
- Vezey Strong (1857–1920), English businessman
