= Lee Chambers (psychologist) =

British psychologist and entrepreneur (born 1985)

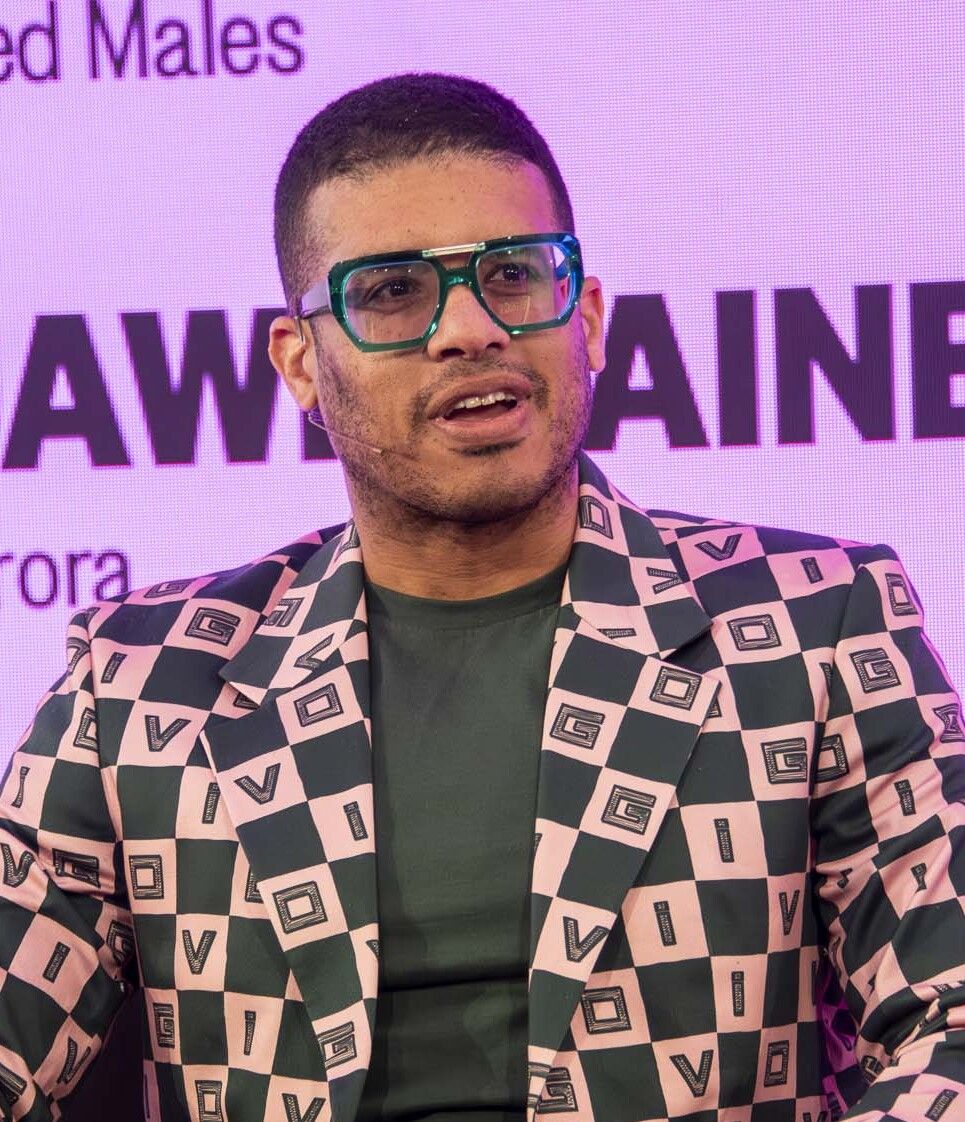
- Chambers at SXSW London 2025
- Born: 22 May 1985 (age 41); Bolton, Lancashire, England
- Education: University of Surrey; Manchester Metropolitan University
- Occupations: Businessman and radio host
- Relatives: Dwain Chambers
- Website: leechambers.org

Lee Chambers (born 22 May 1985) is a British businessman and radio host. Chambers has been interviewed by Vogue, The Guardian, and Newsweek, and is known for analyzing inclusion and allyship in the workplace. He was born in Bolton, United Kingdom, and is the founder of Male Allies UK and Essentialise Workplace Wellbeing.

== Early life ==
Lee Chambers was born and raised in Bolton, Greater Manchester, England. He has credited his father Delroy Chambers, a civil servant, and his mother Susan Chambers, a nanny, for his work ethic and academic achievement. He is the oldest of three brothers, and the first in his family to attend university.

== Education ==
Chambers earned a BSc in international business psychology and an MSc in psychology from the University of Surrey. He is currently a doctoral student at University of Pennsylvania.

== Career ==
=== PhenomGames ===
After being made redundant from a corporate finance graduate scheme at the Co-operative Bank, Chambers founded the video game company PhenomGames in 2008. Initially trading from his parents' house, the business expanded into Europe. While leading PhenomGames, Chambers' immune system failed, leaving him immobile and having to learn to walk again. The company was sold to a Danish conglomerate in 2020.

=== Essentialise Workplace Wellbeing ===
Chambers is the founder of Essentialise Workplace Wellbeing, a company that provides mental wellbeing initiatives to other organizations. Chambers founded the business due to his own health challenges, and market opportunity for data-driven wellbeing. For his work with Essentialise, Chambers was selected as a Rising Star at the Hive Business Awards, and received a Great British Entrepreneur Award in 2021.

=== Other work ===
Chambers is part of the Oppo Color Counsel, alongside actress Amy Jackson. He has worked as a performance coach for sports clubs, including Manchester City F.C. and Everton F.C. In 2021, Chambers fronted a campaign for Charles Tyrwhitt, modelling for the launch of their Business of Life collection.

Chambers is the host of the Self Aware Entrepreneur Show and was voted in the Top 50 BAME Entrepreneurs Under 50 in 2020 alongside Nitin Passi, Eric Yuan and Rangan Chatterjee. He has also been recognized by Startups.co.uk. Chambers is a contributor to discussions in the media regarding mental health and wellbeing and has appeared on the BBC, ITV and Channel 5.

In 2023, Chambers founded Male Allies UK. He received the Freedom of the City of London for services to equality in business and outstanding contribution to gender equality.

== Awards ==
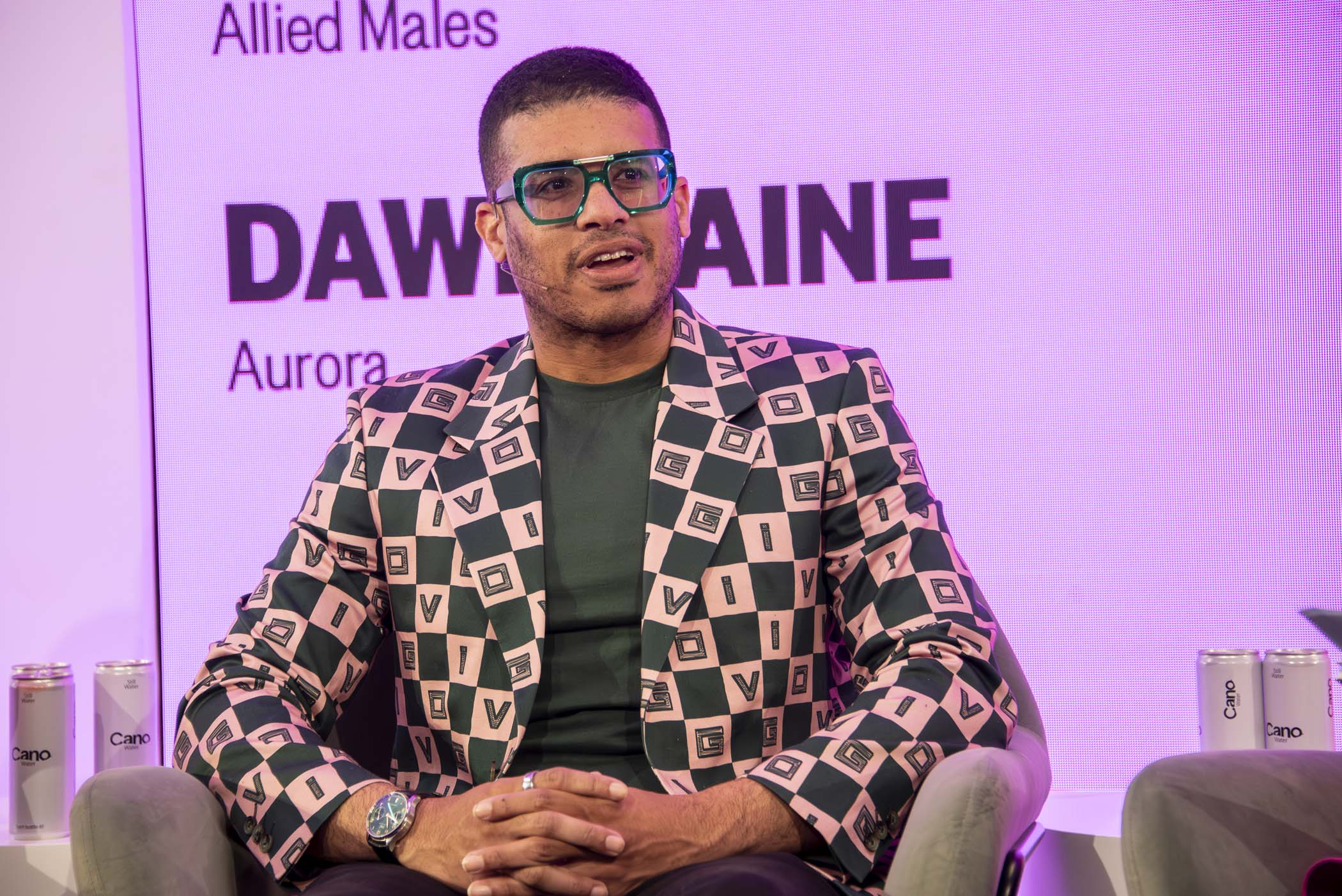
- Chambers at SXSW London in June 2025.
  Top 50 BAME Entrepreneur Under 50 (2020)
- UN Women Changemaker of the Year (2023)
- Great British Entrepreneur Award - Service Industries (2021)
- In 2022, Chambers was inducted into the Black Cultural Archives (BCA), for services to business and health, as part of a cohort of 40 black leaders from across the UK, in celebration of the 40th anniversary of the BCA's opening. Also in 2022, he was recognised as a Marie Claire "Future Shaper", alongside musician Harry Styles and sportsman Tom Daley.
- Chambers was the first Black British scientist to be made a Kavli Fellow of the National Academy of Sciences in March 2023.

=== Radio ===
Chambers' life story was the subject of a BBC Radio 4 programme presented by Matthew Syed broadcast on 22 November 2021, named: Sideways 19. Is This What Success Looks Like?

== Personal life ==
Chambers is the father of three children. He has two from his first marriage and a third from his current relationship.
