= Ian Tait =

General practitioner and medical historian

Ian Greville Tait (18 August 1926 – 4 February 2013) was a British medical doctor who spent most of his career as a general practitioner (GP) in Aldeburgh, Suffolk. He was a major figure in the modernisation of general practice in the UK during the 1960s and 1970s. According to Stephen Lock, former editor of the BMJ, Tait's work "helped transform general practice into a major medical specialty, giving family physicians a status equivalent to hospital consultants."

== Early life and education ==
Tait was born at Archpool, Handcross in West Sussex on 18 August 1926, to Elizabeth Joan (née Alford) and Greville Brend Tait. His father was a GP, and members of the family had been medical doctors for three generations. He attended Cranleigh School in Surrey. He did his national service in the Royal Naval Volunteer Reserve at the end of the Second World War, serving on minesweepers.

His medical training was at Magdalene College, Cambridge (1953 or 1954), and St Bartholomew's Hospital Medical School, London (1954). He later earned an MD degree by thesis from Cambridge for his research on general practice medical records. After his retirement, he studied medical history at the Wellcome Institute in London.

== Career ==
Tait briefly worked at St Bartholomew's Hospital, St Luke's Hospital in New York and Ipswich Hospital, before settling into general practice at Aldeburgh, Suffolk in 1959, with John Stevens. Apart from an 18-month sabbatical working in Swaziland, he remained there for the rest of his career, retiring from clinical practice in 1992.

With Stevens, he originated a training programme for medical students who intended to become GPs; the three-year vocational course based at Ipswich Hospital not only introduced students to general medicine, paediatrics, obstetrics and geriatrics, but included a year of GP training, stressing holistic patient care, and featuring weekly day-release sessions led by a clinical psychologist. The course was the earliest to be based in a district general hospital and became a model for other courses. From the late 1960s, Tait trained working GPs to train new ones. He pioneered the idea of bringing medical students at the University of Cambridge into GP surgeries early in their medical degree, with Bernard Reiss.

Tait had a particular interest in medical records. Before the era of computer records, he studied methods of making patient record-keeping more rigorous, research that improved patient safety and also eased the transition to electronic records.

He was a committed member of the College of General Practitioners (later the Royal College of General Practitioners), which had been founded in 1952, serving in various positions on the board of the East Anglian division from 1965, including as provost (president). After his retirement he worked on its national heritage committee and in 2002 wrote a history of the society.

He became the East Anglian GP regional adviser in 1972, in association with the University of Cambridge. He was a visiting professor of general practice at University College Hospital in London (1976) and also at Canberra.

Tait acted as GP to the Aldeburgh Festival, founded by the composer Benjamin Britten, who was a personal friend. Tait organised Britten's medical treatment for several years before the composer's death, coordinating with his cardiologist. During his final months, Tait was angered by the publication of a biography falsely stating that Britten's cardiac problems had been caused by syphilis, but died before the facts could be published.

== Awards and honours ==
Tait was awarded the Royal College of General Practitioners's Baron Dr Ver Heyden de Lancey Memorial Award in 1987. He delivered the Gale memorial lecture in 1973.

== Personal life ==
He married Janet Felicity Nye, daughter of an insurance executive, on 12 June 1954. She also worked as a GP at the Aldeburgh practice. They had three sons and a daughter.

Tait was a member of the Society of Friends (Quakers) and served as a town councillor. He protested against war in Iraq and campaigned against local ribbon development. He was an amateur watercolour artist, studying with the local artist Tessa Henderson. He was one of the founders of the Aldeburgh Poetry Festival, and published two poetry collections, Wave Watch and River Songs, described as resembling George Crabbe.

Tait had an operation on his heart in 2012. He died from pneumonia on 4 February 2013.
