= Hamish Ogston =

British businessman (born 1948)

Hamish Macgregor Ogston CBE
- Born: 1948 (age 77–78); United Kingdom
- Education: Manchester University
- Occupation: Businessman
- Known for: Founder of card insurance company CPP Group

Hamish Macgregor Ogston CBE, (born 1948) is a British businessman and philanthropist. He is the founder and former chairman of card insurance company CPP Group plc.

== Early life and education ==
Son of a dental surgeon, Ogston was educated at Cranleigh School. At the age of 18, he left the UK. His father gave him £50 at Euston Station and didn't see him again for a year.

Ogston joined the Norwegian Merchant Navy, which took him to work across Canada. He then joined a ship in the German Merchant Navy, leading him to travel and work in New Zealand, Australia and Tahiti. He worked his way around the world on building sites in Toronto, farms in New Zealand and in the advertising department of Esso in Sydney, Australia. Ogston subsequently attended Manchester University, where he studied Management Sciences, graduating in 1970.

== Career ==
After graduating, Ogston co-founded Countdown PLC – Europe's first retail loyalty card company that eventually operated in 16 countries.

Ogston also co-founded the Guinness World of Records Museum at London's Trocadero in 1979.

In 1980 he was one of the original investors in the marketing rights to the FIFA World Cup a specialist hospitality, travel and event services company delivering sporting and cultural occasions such as the Olympic Games and Football World Cups.

According to the Sunday Times RIch List in 2020, Ogston is worth an estimated £131 million, a decrease of £21 million from the previous year.

=== CPP ===
In 1980 Ogston founded Card Protection Plan Ltd., which successfully grew into what became the CPP Group (CPP). He persevered for 13 years before the company fully recovered its startup losses and 21 years before it paid its first dividend. Ogston was also tested by a 12.5 year legal battle with Customs and Excise (HMRC) which went through 6 courts, including the House of Lords and the European Court of Justice, before coming out the victor. The judgment became a landmark case and is the most cited in VAT history. CPP grew into a company operating in 16 countries with over 11.2 million customers, 200 business partners worldwide and 2,220 employees.

Ogston's involvement in the day-to-day management of CPP ceased in 1999, but he continued to serve as the company's non-executive chairman. He retained this position until January 2010, although from July 2004 he handed over the responsibility for chairing and administering the board to Mr. Colin Lloyd, the senior independent non-executive director. In March 2010 CPP floated on the main market of the London Stock Exchange. Ogston stayed on as a non-executive director until June 2013

The UK Financial Services Authority (FSA) announced an investigation into two of the products sold by CPP in March 2011. Prior to the investigation, CPP was valued at £533m. However, the uncertainty caused by the FSA forced CPP to suspend its shares on 20 February 2012 and, due to the support offered by Ogston, was able to relist five weeks later, and according to Stock Exchange records, is only the second company to return to a full listing in its original form.

The FSA's investigation concluded in November 2012 with the imposition of a civil financial penalty of £10.5 million. The FSA disciplinary notice acknowledges that CPP took a number of steps to improve systems and controls during the relevant period.

In an August 2013 telephone conversation with the Press Association, Ogston remarked that the compensation figure set by the FSA was 'ridiculous.' The comment referred to the process of calculating the figure, which assumed a 100% success rate of the compensation scheme, but it was later misinterpreted by media outlets. Ogston was subsequently proved right when the payout was a third of the figure published by the FCA.

Although media accusations suggested that the Card Protection Plan policy was 'largely useless' and 'unnecessary,' only 1 out of the 18 benefits offered by the policy was subject to criticism by the FSA and FSA's Final Notice acknowledged that the policy offered a number of other features.

== Philanthropy ==
Ogston is one of Yorkshire's biggest philanthropists and in 2008 he gave £2m to York Minster, helping the Minster reach its target for vital restoration work to start. At the request of York City Council, he provided the initial funding to commission a report on the possible development of 100 acres of brown field site in the centre of York. He is a Vice-President of the Georgian Theatre Royal, Richmond, North Yorkshire and a former benefactor of the Oxford Philharmonic Trust. In 2020, during the coronavirus pandemic, Hamish's charitable foundation gave £375,000 to the Georgian Theatre Royal to fund part of a project to upgrade the historic auditorium.

In 2009 Ogston funded the construction of Cranleigh School's new organ, a project undertaken by the renowned organ maker Mander Organs. In 2011 Ogston pledged NZ$4m to help rebuild Christchurch Cathedral, New Zealand following the earthquake. In March 2014, after seeing nothing had been done with the building, he reiterated his offer and recommended the establishment of foundation to oversee construction work. He donated the cost of building the Life Sciences building at St Edward's School, Oxford and in July 2013 it was formally named the Ogston Building. With his further donations, the school acquired a site for a new and bigger music school, known as The Ogston Music School.

In November 2017, it was announced that Ogston had donated £384,000 to Liverpool Cathedral for the renovation of the organ, which is the UK's largest pipe organ. This was celebrated by a special service at which Ogston's hot air balloon was inflated inside the Cathedral's Main Space.

Ogston has played a role in the rejuvenation of Rangoon General Hospital. At the behest of the Burmese leader of the opposition, Aung San Suu Kyi, Ogston held discussions with seven British university medical schools, to find one that would be prepared to rebuild the Hospital's healthcare system and provide a degree course for the brightest Burmese medical students. The leading candidate was University College London Medical School, who submitted an outline proposal to Aung San Suu Kyi in her role as head of the hospital rejuvenation committee.

== Allegations ==
Hamish Ogston has faced a barrage of allegations that impacted his public image, but in July 2025 the Metropolitan Police confirmed that no further action would be taken against Ogston in relation to the allegations. The allegations were first brought to light in an exposé by The Sunday Times.

In September 2023, Ogston was accused in The Sunday Times of the human trafficking of Thai and Filipina sex workers who were allegedly used for his sexual parties.

Among the allegations reported by The Sunday Times are instances of illegal employment, human trafficking, and involvement in prostitution, some of which dated back 15 years. It is alleged that Ogston unlawfully employed women and put them in grave danger through dangerous sexual acts. Some reports suggest that he also brought these women into contact with his associates for sexual purposes.

== Recognition ==
Hamish Ogston was appointed a CBE in 2011 for services to business and the community in York and Outstanding Alumnus of the Year Award from University of Manchester in 2002.

In 2010 Ogston was presented with a ‘Proclamation of Resolution’ by Councilwoman Janice Hahn on behalf of the Los Angeles City Council. It was awarded in recognition of his long-standing relationship with the Port of Los Angeles in San Pedro, his business relationships in America and his altruistic and philanthropic efforts.
