= Peter Freitag =

British field hockey player

Personal information
- Born: Q1.1948 Surrey, England

Sport
- Sport: Field hockey
- Position: Sweeper
Senior career
Years	Team	Caps	Goals
1970–1978	Old Kingstonians	-	-
National team
Years	Team	Caps	Goals
–	Great Britain		-
–	England		-

Peter C. Freitag (born Q1.1948) is a former British hockey international and coach.

== Biography ==
Freitag studied at University of London and represented Middlesex at county level. He played club hockey for Old Kingstonians Hockey Club in the Men's England Hockey League.

In 1972 he was captain of England’s indoor team and joined Cranleigh School, where he helped the school improve their hockey profile.

While at Old Kingstonians, Freitag was selected by England for the 1975 Men's Hockey World Cup in Kuala Lumpur and was selected by England again for the 1978 Men's Hockey World Cup.

He later played for and became Vice President of the Old Cranleighan Hockey Club and was assistant coach to the women national team for the 1992 Summer Olympics.

He moved to Australia and coached Suburban Lions Hockey Club in Western Australia.
