= Olivia Arben =

British model

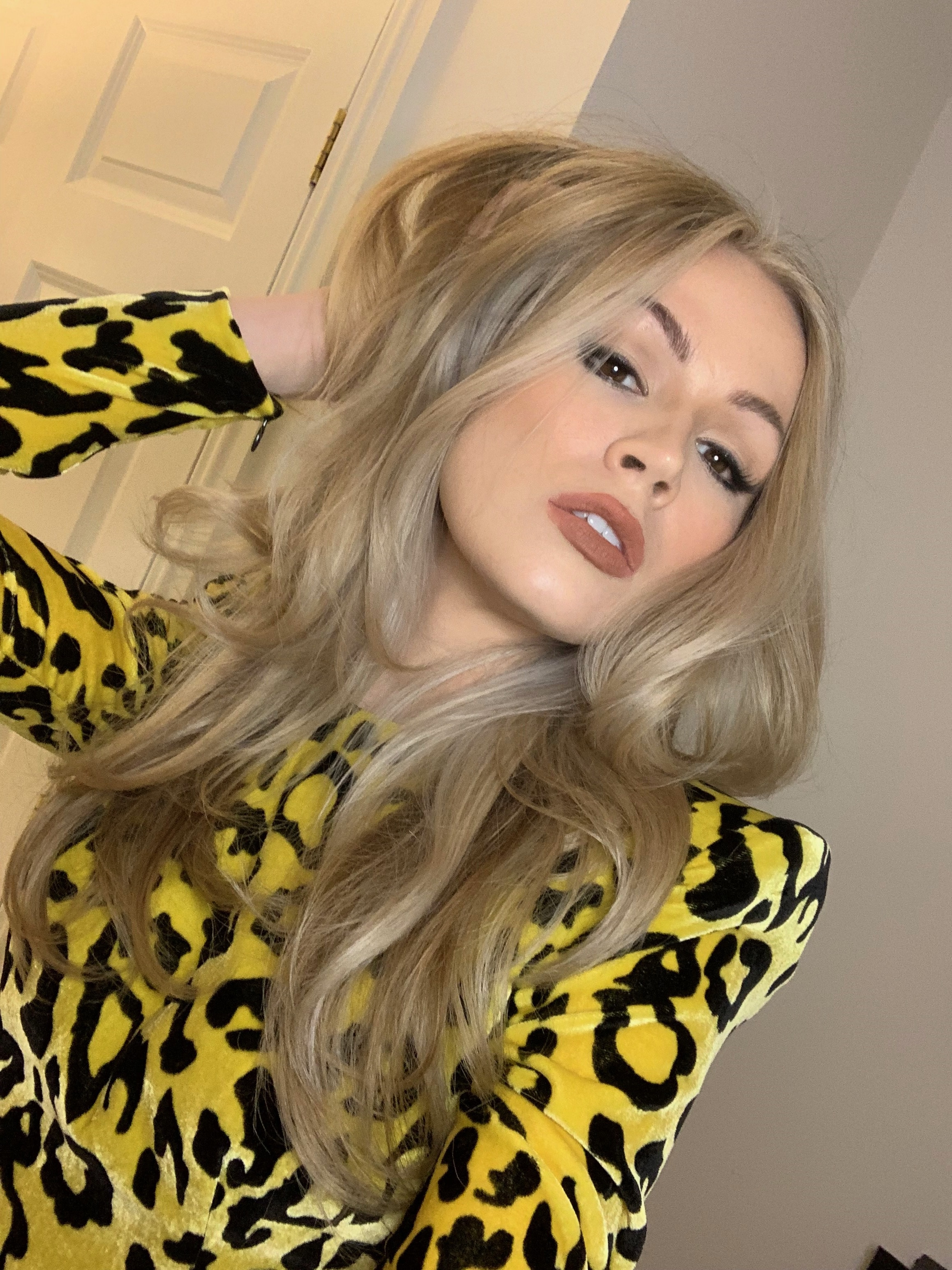
- Arben in 2019
- Born: 19 May 1997 (age 29); London, England
- Education: Cranleigh School; London College of Fashion
- Occupation: Model
- Years active: 2013–present
- Modeling information
- Height: 172 cm (5 ft 8 in)
- Hair color: Dark blonde
- Eye color: Brown
- Agency: Elite New York); d’management (Milan); Francina (Barcelona); Karin (Paris); Visage (Zurich)

Olivia Arben (born 19 May 1997) is a British model who has appeared on the covers of Vogue Magazine, Numéro Magazine, Harper's Bazaar, Elle Magazine, L'Officiel, Glamour magazine. and Grazia magazine.

== Early life ==
Arben was a boarder at Cranleigh School in Surrey. After completing school, she joined London College of Fashion.

== Career ==
Arben started her modelling career at the age of 15, she made her first appearance in the L’Oreal Colour Trophy. After the death of her father from a heart attack, when she was 16, Olivia joined the British Heart Foundation as one of five officially appointed female Ambassadors in 2019, alongside Pippa Middleton, Sarah, Duchess of York and Dame Esther Rantzen. During her early modeling career, Arben appeared in magazines, including Country and Townhouse Magazine, Arcadia, Maxim, Esquire, Vogue Italia, and Vogue UK online, as well as appearing on the front covers of L'Officiel Baltic, and YOU magazine.

During her career, Arben has fronted campaigns for brands including Roja Parfums,Emanuel Ungaro, Carat London, Guess, Thomas Sabo, Cartier, L'Oréal, Triangl Swim, Joshua Kane Bespoke, Steve Madden, Harvey Nichols, Timberland, Needle & Thread, Juicy Couture, Pronovias, Rami Kadi, The Deck, and NFL Europe Super Bowl 2017 EU Clothing Campaign.

Olivia was voted one of the best dressed at the Cannes film festival 2018 by Elle USA magazine.

Arben has walked London, New York, Paris & Berlin Fashion week for designers such as Cartier, Rami Kadi, Malan Breton, Roland Mouret, Hervé Léger, Atelier Zuhra, Joshua Kane and Jean Gritsfedlt. Arben has been shot by notable photographers including Ellen Von Unwerth, Rankin, Branislav Simoncik, Luis Monteiro and David Yarrow.

As of 2022, Arben is one of the top 100 most followed models according to models.com She has also been ranked on their Trending & Runway lists.

Olivia was appointed as an ambassador for British fashion by the British Parliamentary Society in 2022 in the House of Commons alongside designers including Malan Breton and the late Vivienne Westwood.

=== Brand collaborations and partnerships ===
Olivia's first brand collaboration, Olivia Arben X Terry De Havilland, The Rebel Collection was launched October 2022. Following the success of the first, Olivia’s second brand collaboration, Olivia Arben X Terry De Havilland, The liquid gold collection was launched October 2024.

Olivia’s first perfume Vanilla Bombshell by Olivia Arben was launched in April 2026 in partnership with US based firm Flowering Pharmacy and it quickly became one of their best selling fragrances.

== Public image ==
Olivia is often compared to Claudia Schiffer and Brigit Bardot by the fashion industry, both of whom she says influence her work. Olivia has been called the "Sexiest British model" and named the "British Bombshell" by FHM, Esquire & Maxim Olivia is known as the British Army’s favourite model, there are 2 posters of her hanging in the Falkland’s Officer’s common room.

== Personal life ==
On 19 May 2019 Olivia got engaged to her long-term boyfriend Nico Cary, an entrepreneur, at Hôtel du Cap Eden Roc during the Cannes Film Festival. They were married on 28 August 2021 at Goodwood House. The wedding was covered by Hello! Magazine U.K.
