= Will Howard (cricketer) =

English cricketer (born 1981)

Personal information
- Full name: William Oliver Fitzalen Howard
- Born: 13 February 1981 (age 45); Guildford, Surrey, England
- Batting: Right-handed
- Role: Wicket-keeper

Domestic team information
- Years: Team
- 2002–2004: Oxford UCCE

Career statistics
Competition	First-class
Matches	5
Runs scored	131
Batting average	21.83
100s/50s	–/1
Top score	72
Catches/stumpings	2/2
- Source: Cricinfo, 16 July 2020

William Oliver Fitzalen Howard (born 13 February 1981) is an English former first-class cricketer.

Howard was born at Guildford and was educated at Cranleigh School, before going up to Oxford Brookes University. While studying at Oxford Brookes, he played first-class cricket for Oxford MCCU from 2002–04, making five appearances. (Note: Oxford UCCE differed from Oxford University Cricket Club in that it was open to students at Oxford Brookes University, whereas Oxford University Cricket Club is exclusively for students of the constituent colleges of the University of Oxford.) Playing as a wicket-keeper, he scored 131 runs in his five matches at an average of 21.83 and a high score of 72, his only first-class half century.

After trials with Sussex and Leicestershire, Howard founded a theatre ticketing business. In 2008, he toured Uganda with a Marylebone Cricket Club team captained by Jamie Dalrymple in 2008, playing minor matches against the Uganda national cricket team.
