= Jake Jacob =

England international rugby union player

- Full name: Herbert Percy Jacob
- Born: 12 October 1902 Elham, Kent, England
- Died: 8 July 1996 (aged 93) Myaree, Perth, Australia
- School: Cranleigh School
- University: Christ Church, Oxford
- Occupation: Schoolmaster

Rugby union career
- Position: Three-quarter
International career
Years	Team	Apps	(Points)
1924–30	England	5	(12)

Herbert Percy "Jake" Jacob (12 October 1902 – 8 July 1996) was an English international rugby union player.

Jacob hailed from Elham, Kent, a village not far from Folkestone. He attended Cranleigh School and pursued further studies at Christ Church, Oxford. A three-quarter, Jacob gained his rugby blues for Oxford University as a freshman in 1924 and then captained the team in the 1925 Varsity Match.

Capped five times for England, Jacob played all four matches of their grand slam-winning 1924 Five Nations campaign, primarily as a winger, with most noted contribution a hat-trick of tries against France at Twickenham. His fifth and final cap didn't come until 1930, when he was called up from Blackheath to stand in for Frank Malir in a match against France.

Jacob coached rugby at Cranleigh School and produced two England internationals of the 1930s, Robert Carr and Jeff Reynolds. He was also a housemaster, for 16 years, and before retiring served as acting headmaster in 1959/60, until the appointment of David Emms. After the death of his wife, Jacob emigrated with his son to Canada and later settled in Perth, Australia, where his daughter lived. He was the last surviving member of the 1924 grand slam side.

== See also ==
- List of England national rugby union players
