= Paul Coleridge =

Retired British judge (born 1949)

Sir Paul James Duke Coleridge (born 30 May 1949) is a retired judge of the High Court of England and Wales. He is currently the Chairman of the Marriage Foundation.

== Education ==
Coleridge was educated at Cranleigh School, and at The College of Law.

== Career ==
Sir Paul Coleridge was called to the bar at Middle Temple in 1970. He was in practice at the Queen Elizabeth Building from 1970 to 1985 and 1989 to 2000, serving as international legal adviser to Baron Hans Heinrich Thyssen-Bornemisza in Lugano, Switzerland in the intervening period. He became a Queen's Counsel in 1993. On 28 September 2000, he was appointed a High Court judge, receiving the customary knighthood, and assigned to the Family Division. In 2012, Coleridge established Marriage Foundation, a UK-based think tank which champions long-lasting stable relationships within marriage.

== Publicity ==
In an interview, Sir Paul Coleridge angered gay rights campaigners when he said Government same-sex marriage plans were a "minority issue" because it affected "0.1%" of the population during a time in which society was facing a "crisis of family breakdown". In 2013 Coleridge was handed a formal warning from the Judicial Conduct and Investigations Office declaring that his decision to give this interview, and another one in which he discussed the "decline of marriage," was "incompatible with his judicial responsibilities and therefore amounts to judicial misconduct". He criticised the decision as a "disproportionate and unfair reaction to a few lines in two newspapers" and in April 2014 received a reprimand for undermining the judicial disciplinary process.

== Retirement ==
In November 2013 Sir Paul Coleridge announced his retirement from being a judge in order to "concentrate on his foundation" adding that he would be more free to be "outspoken". He said he could have served more time if he had "more solid support" from his colleagues in the judiciary some of whom he claimed were too frightened to publicly support his work at the Marriage Foundation.
