= John Carmichael (cricketer) =

English cricketer (1858–1914)

Personal information
- Born: 4 July 1858; Bubwith, Yorkshire
- Died: 24 August 1914 (aged 56); United States
- Batting: Right-handed

Domestic team information
- Years: Team
- 1876–1881: Surrey
- Source: Cricinfo, 12 March 2017

John Carmichael (4 July 1858 – 24 August 1914) was an English cricketer. He played 14 first-class matches for Surrey County Cricket Club between 1876 and 1881.

Carmichael was born at Bubwith in Yorkshire in 1858 into a farming family. The family moved to farm at Tilford in Surrey whilst Carmichael was a child, and he was educated at Cranleigh School where he played cricket. By 1881 his mother, Martha, was farming 300 acres (120 ha) at Till Hill, having been widowed.

Considered by Scores and Biographies as a "promising batsman" and "fine field", Carmichael made his first-class debut for Surrey at The Oval in August 1876 against Kent, recording a duck in his only innings. After playing against Gloucestershire later in the month, he appeared five times the following season, scoring 147 runs, including his highest first-class score of 47 which he made against Nottinghamshire at Trent Bridge. A single appearance in 1878 against the touring Australians, was followed by six in 1881. He kept wicket occasionally, taking three catches and making three stumpings against Sussex at The Oval in August 1881.

Carmichael died in the United States in August 1881 as the result of a motoring accident. He was aged 56.
