= Jeff Clements (rugby union) =

England international rugby union player

- Full name: Jeffrey Woodward Clements
- Born: 18 August 1932 Wincanton, England
- Died: 4 October 1986 (aged 54) Guildford, England
- School: Cranleigh School
- University: University of Cambridge

Rugby union career
- Position: Wing-forward
International career
Years	Team	Apps	(Points)
1959	England	3	(0)

Jeffrey Woodward Clements (18 August 1932 – 4 October 1986) was an English international rugby union player.

Born in Wincanton, Clements was educated at Cranleigh School and the University of Cambridge.

Clements, a wing-forward, captained Cambridge University in the 1955 Varsity Match. He was capped three times by England in the 1959 Five Nations Championship, making his debut against Ireland at Lansdowne Road.

== See also ==
- List of England national rugby union players
