= Vincent Warren Low =

British surgeon (1867–1942)

- Born: 1 September 1867; Staines, Surrey
- Died: 2 September 1942 (aged 75); Paddington, London
- Medical career
- Profession: Surgeon
- Notable works: innovative surgery for Erb's palsy

Vincent Warren Low CB FRCS (1 September 1867 – 2 September 1942) was a British surgeon.

== Biography ==
After education at Cranleigh School, V. Warren Low studied medicine in London at St Mary's Hospital. He qualified MRCS in 1891. In 1892 he graduated MB (Lond). In 1893 he graduated BS (Lond) and was elected FRCS. In 1895 he graduated with the higher MD. During the Second Boer War he served from 1899 to 1902 as a civil surgeon with the British field force and was awarded the Queen's South Africa Medal with seven clasps. When he returned to England, he was briefly an assistant surgeon at the Great Northern Hospital. At St Mary's Hospital, he became an assistant surgeon, a lecturer in surgery, and a surgeon, eventually retiring as consulting surgeon. He was elected a governor and vice-president of St Mary's Hospital.

He first came into prominence by his remarkable operative treatment of upper-arm palsy in children, reported jointly with Wilfred Harris, MRCP, at the annual meeting in 1903 of the British Medical Association. Basing his surgery on the latest physiological researches of Sherrington, Ballance, and others, he successfully undertook cross-union of the nerve roots.

During WWI he served as a temporary colonel in the Army Medical Service. He served in the Gallipoli Campaign and in Egypt as consulting surgeon to the troops in the Mediterranean. For his military service he was mentioned in despatches and in 1916 was created CB (military division).

Low was president of the Royal Society of Medicine from 1932 to 1934 and president of the Society's section of surgery in 1927–1928.

On 31 May 1902 at St Mary's, Staines, V. Warren Low married Mabel Ashby, eldest daughter of John Ashby, J.P. When Low died in 1942, the day after his 75th birthday, he was survived by his widow, four sons, and two daughters. The second youngest of the four sons, Roger Vincent Low, was on the Oxford rowing team in the 1930 Boat Race between Oxford and Cambridge.

== Selected publications ==
- "St. Mary's Hospital: Two cases of Richter's hernia with perforation and peritonitis". The Lancet. 164 (4230): 895–896. 1904. doi:10.1016/s0140-6736(01)02226-7.
- Low, V. W. (7 March 1908). "An Address On the Modern Treatment of Surgical Tuberculosis. Delivered before the Windsor Medical Society". Br Med J. 1 (2462): 550–554. doi:10.1136/bmj.1.2462.550. PMC 2436153. PMID 20763718.
- Low, V. Warren (1909). "Melanotic Growth on Dorsum of Hand with Secondary-Glands and Evidence of General Dissemination". Proceedings of the Royal Society of Medicine. 2 (Clin Sect): 132–134. doi:10.1177/003591570900200150. PMC 2047092. PMID 19973374.
- Low, V. Warren (1912). "Multiple melanotic sarcomata of the skin, possibly secondary to a melanotic sarcoma of the skin, removed eighteen months ago". Proceedings of the Royal Society of Medicine. 5: 104–106. doi:10.1177/003591571200500237. PMC 2006057.
