= Missguided =

UK-based clothing retailer

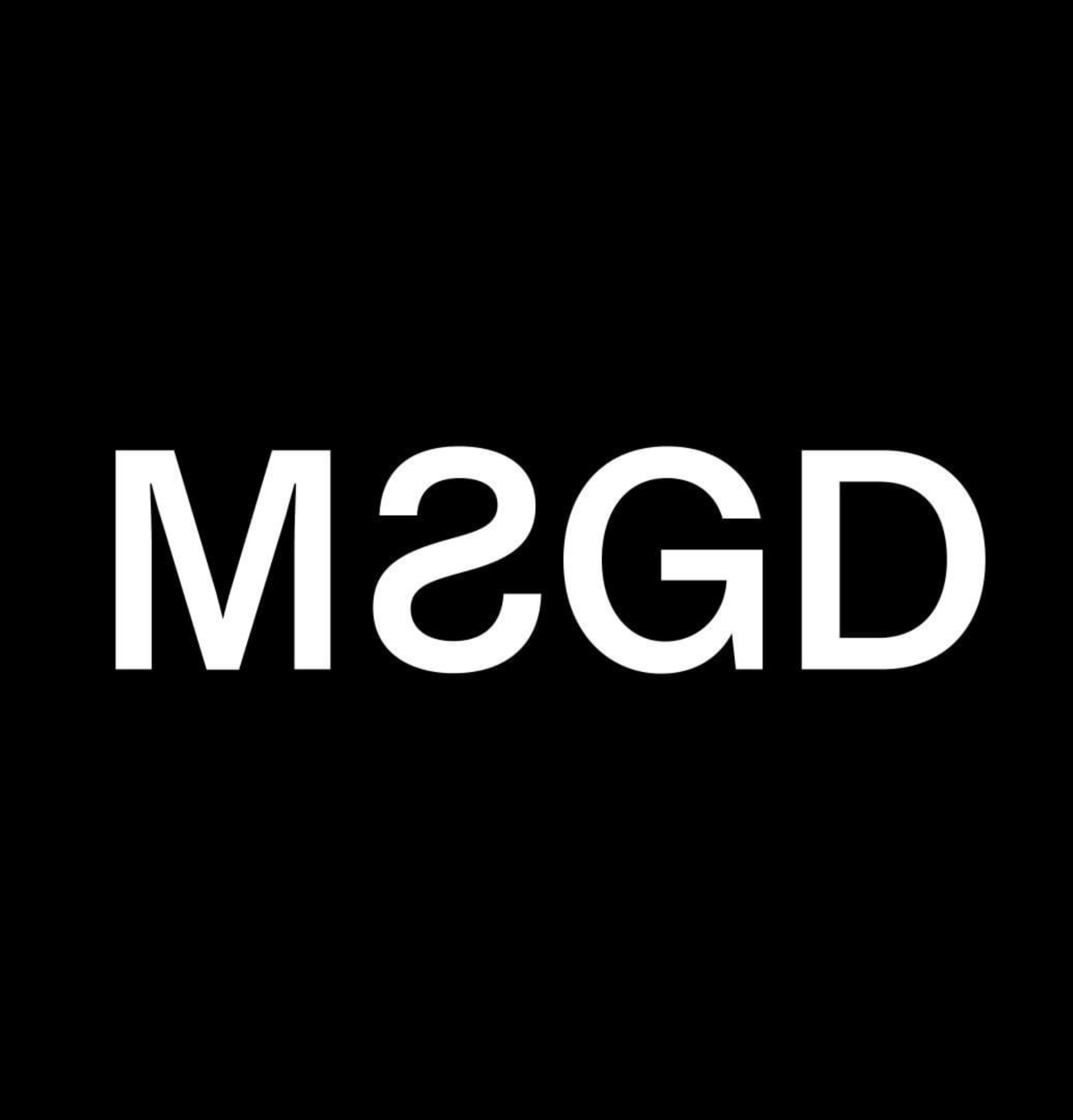
- Trade name: Missguided
- Type: Private
- Industry: Retail
- Founded: 2009; 17 years ago
- Founder: Nitin Passi
- Headquarters: Trafford Park, UK
- Key people: Greg Pateras
- Products: Clothing
- Parent: Shein
- Website: missguided.co.uk

Missguided is a UK-based fast-fashion retailer specialising in clothing, shoes and accessories for women aged 16-35 years old.

Missguided's headquarters were in Stretford, Greater Manchester until 2015 when they moved to Trafford Park. In May 2022 the company went into administration, with the assets subsequently bought by Frasers Group. In 2023, Frasers sold the branding and intellectual property of Missguided to online marketplace Shein, while retaining the staff and real estate.

== History ==
Missguided was established in 2009 by Nitin Passi. In the 2010s the online retailer experienced rapid growth in the UK and in the same decade, expanded into the US, Australia, France and Germany.

In March 2015, Missguided launched in US department store Nordstrom, followed by a concession at Selfridges Trafford Centre, Manchester in June. In November 2016, the brand opened its first standalone 20,000 sqft flagship store in Westfield Stratford City, London.

In September 2017, Missguided announced the launch of the menswear label Mennace. In February 2019, they closed their flagship Stratford store, citing widening losses despite rising revenue. Nonetheless, the brand went on to open its first store in the Middle East in the coveted Dubai Mall within the same month.

In December 2021, investment firm Alteri Investors acquired a 50% stake in Missguided.

In May 2022, it was reported Missguided were on the 'brink of collapse' after being issued with a winding up petition by its suppliers who were owed millions of pounds.

On 31 May 2022, Missguided went into administration after being unable to pay its debts. The next day, on 1 June 2022, Frasers Group bought the intellectual property of Missguided and its sister brand Mennace for around £20 million. It is estimated that 87 staff members will be made redundant and 147 will be moved to Frasers Group, with the legal name changed to MGL Realisations (2022) Limited in July 2022. The buyout resulted in the closing of all physical Missguided stores across the globe. Frasers Group later bought fashion company I Saw It First. Greg Pateras, former Matalan CEO, was appointed CEO of both companies in August 2022.

In March 2023, Missguided began to tease their rebranding on their Instagram page, revealing a brand new logo. On 14th March, Missguided revealed the date of their relaunch is 31 March 2023.

In 30 October 2023, Frasers Group sold the branding rights and intellectual property of Missguided to online marketplace Shein, while retaining the staff and real estate of the company. Shein's operations regarding Missguided are licensed to Passi’s new venture, Sumwon Studios, a Dubai-based brand platform he founded the same year. On 2 September 2024, MGL Realisations (2022) Limited was dissolved following liquidation, with the 'Missguided' name, branding and intellectual property now officially owned under Shein.

== Products ==
In September 2015, the company introduced tall and petite lines which each featured around 70 pieces, following its plus-size collection in November 2014. For Winter 2015, the company launched a range of collections including lingerie, nightwear, a denim collection as well as a premium collection called Peace & Love.

In May 2016, Missguided launched a range of wedding dresses. The collection was made up of 19 pieces for brides and bridesmaids.

=== Collaborations ===
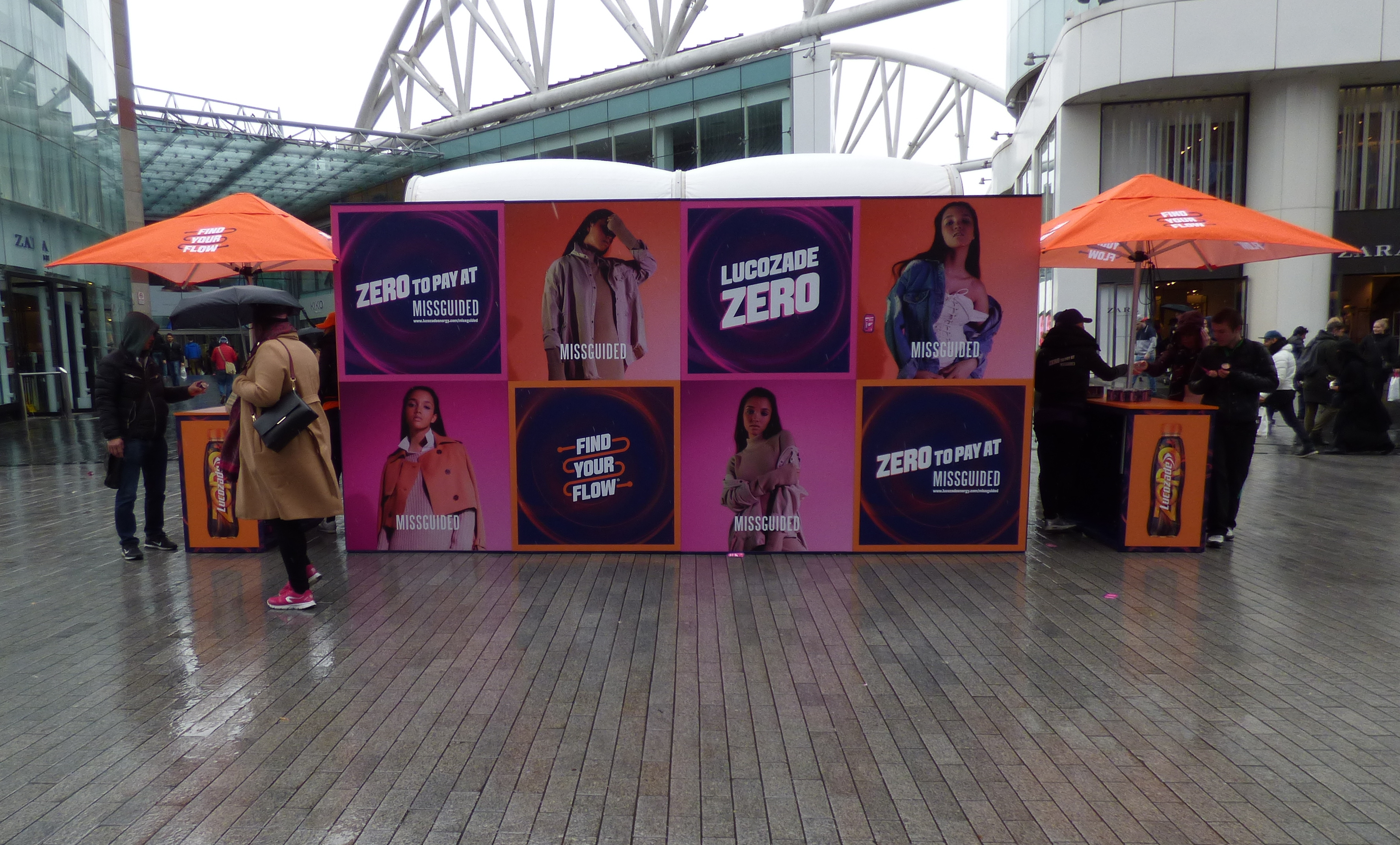
A Lucozade Zero booth marketing a tie-in with Missguided

In March 2014, Missguided marked its fifth birthday with a collaboration with singer Nicole Scherzinger. The 40-piece collection was designed by Scherzinger. May 2015 saw a collaboration between Missguided and R&B singer Pia Mia.

In March 2016, the womenswear label announced that Pamela Anderson would front their SS16 collection. The campaign was shot by Swedish photographer Arvida Byström, from a concept created by creative director and stylist Soki Mak.

A Bikini A Day bloggers Tash Oakley and Devin Brugman collaborated with Missguided in May 2016 to launch a new swimwear line.

In September 2016, the company announced a campaign collaboration with American model and singer Amber Rose. The company also launched collections with bloggers including Carli Bybel, Caroline Receveur, Sarah Ashcroft and Alexis Ren.

In 2017, Missguided launched a collection with British supermodel Jourdan Dunn. In the same year, Missguided was involved in a campaign with Lucozade Zero.

In 2019, Playboy x Missguided was re-launched, after first debuting in 2018. The collection was met with mixed reviews due to the ambiguous reputation of Playboy Magazine and the design choices made in the collaboration. In the same year, Missguided produced a collection in collaboration with model Sofia Richie. The model announced the collaboration across all of her social media accounts, in coordination with the brand's social channels.
