= Georgian Theatre Royal =

Theatre in Richmond, North Yorkshire, England

Coordinates: 54.40409°N 1.73801°W

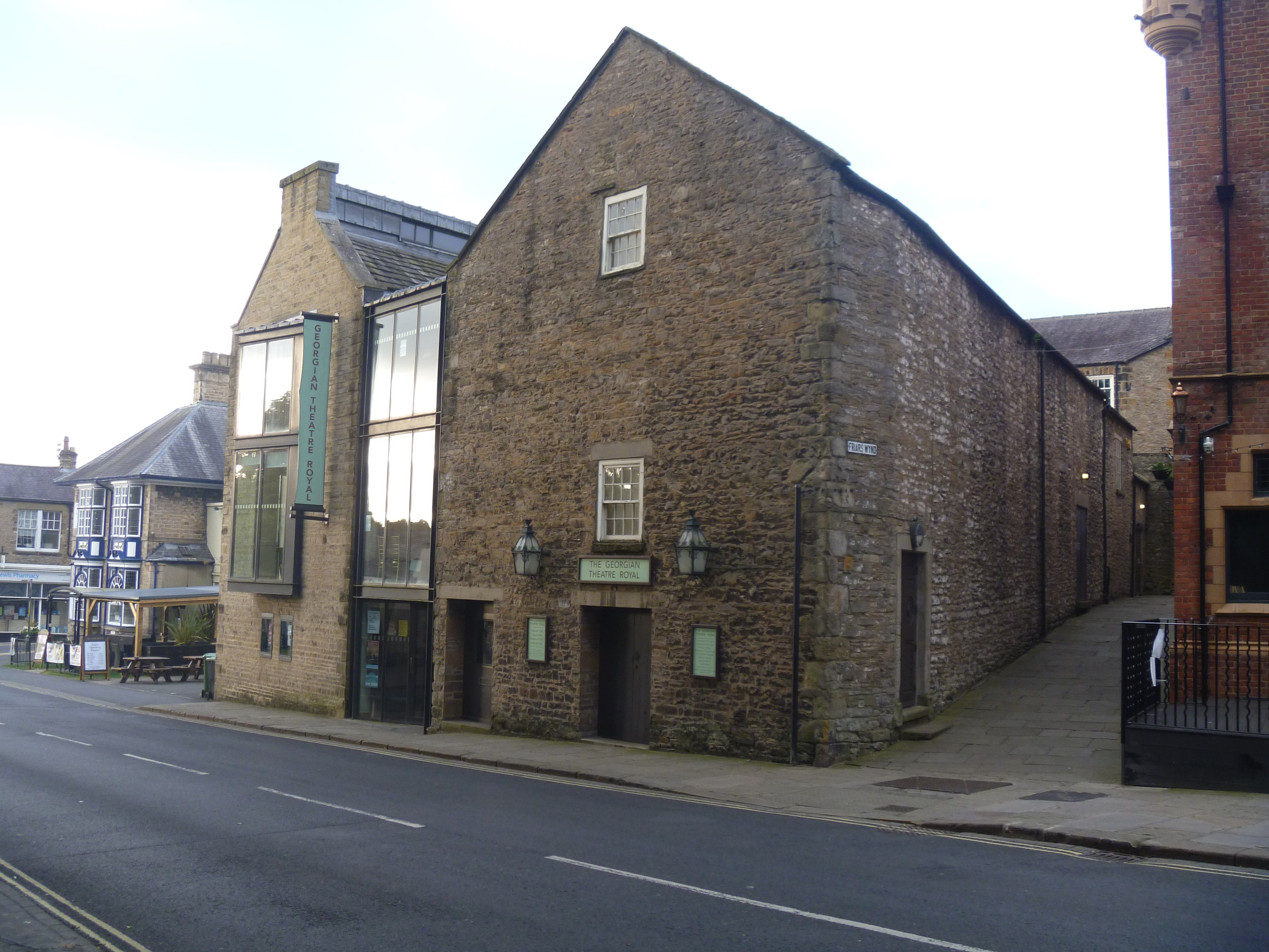
- Georgian Theatre Royal, 2022
- Interactive map of Georgian Theatre Royal
- Address: Victoria Road, Richmond, North Yorkshire, DL10 4DW; Richmond, North Yorkshire; England
- Owner: Georgian Theatre Royal Trust
- Capacity: 155

Construction
- Opened: 1788
- Reopened: 1963

Website
- www.georgiantheatreroyal.co.uk

The Georgian Theatre Royal is a theatre and historic Georgian playhouse in the market town of Richmond, North Yorkshire, England. It is among the oldest of Britain's extant theatres.

It was built in 1788 by the actor-manager Samuel Butler (1750–1812), and his first wife Tryphosa Butler (nee Brockhill) and was one of his circuit of theatres, the others being located in Beverley, Harrogate, Kendal, Northallerton, Ripon, Ulverston and Whitby, though none of these are now open.

After Tryphosa's death in 1797, Butler married Francis Maria Jefferson. After Butler's death the theatre was run by his widow and later their son, Samuel William Butler.

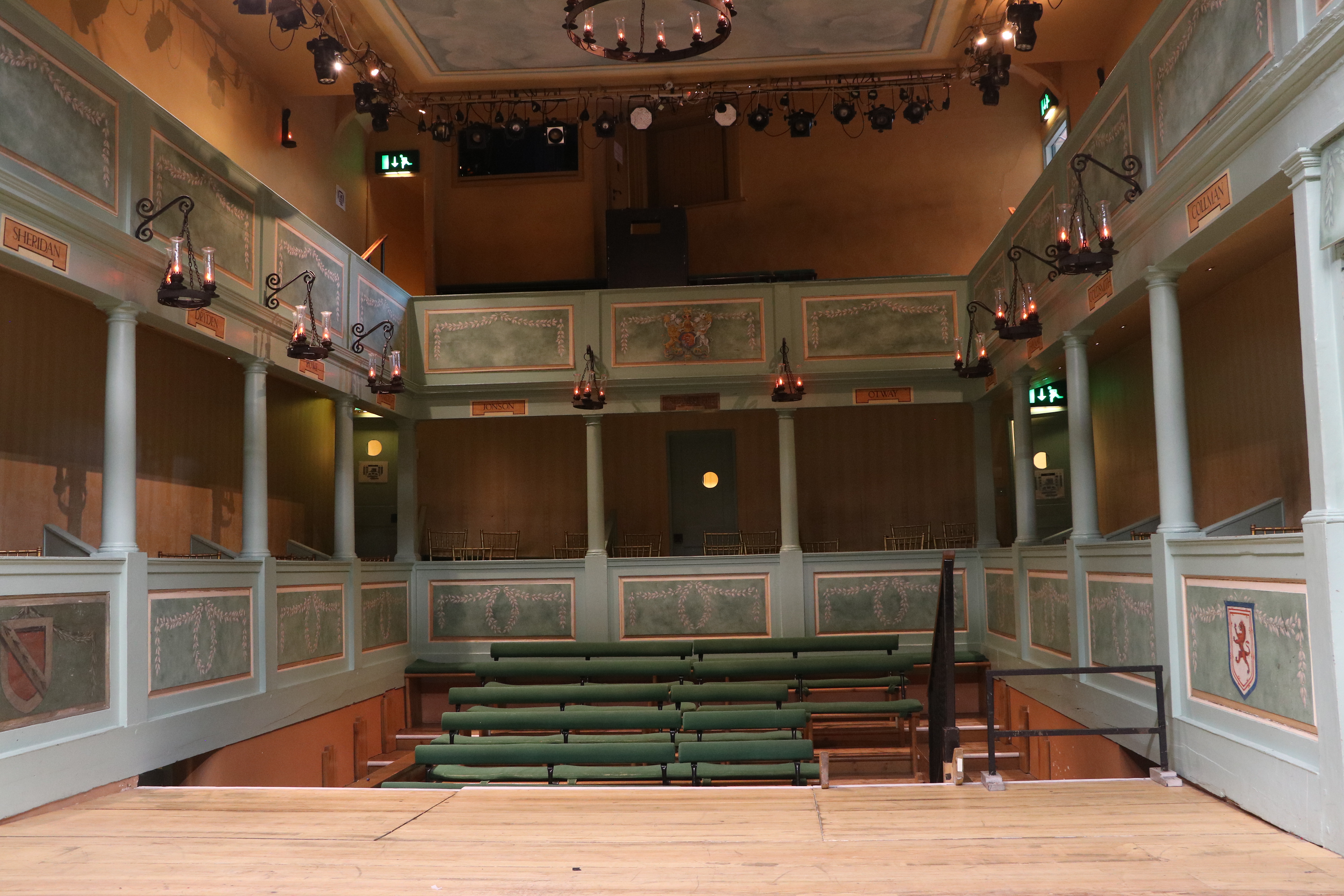
View from the stage

Regular performances at the theatre continued until 1830, when performances became less frequent and in 1848 it was let as an auction house. The Georgian Theatre Royal was reopened by a non-profit trust in 1963, it was expanded in 1996 and had major restoration works, including the addition of a museum, costing £1.6 million in 2002, reopening once again in 2003.

August 2016 saw the opening of The Georgian Theatre Royal Experience, a museum detailing the history of the theatre and displaying artefacts from the theatre's collection, as well as The Woodland Scene, reported to be the oldest surviving stage scenery in the world. In addition, the Paul Iles Learning Centre was reopened following extensive renovation, and now houses The Georgian Theatre Royal Youth Theatre as well as many events including volunteer open days, book groups and costume making sessions.

== History ==
The building is Grade I listed and has hosted the celebrated Georgian actor Edmund Kean, and other figures such as Dame Sybil Thorndike, Joyce Grenfell and Alan Bennett. The Theatre Royal possesses the oldest known set of theatrical scenery in existence. Known as 'The Woodland Scene', it was painted in a workshop in Royston, Hertfordshire and dates back to around 1820. Dame Judi Dench is the theatre's president and Hamish Ogston and Sir Thomas Allen are vice-presidents. The CEO is Clare Allen, formerly of Stratford ArtsHouse, who writes and directs the in-house pantomime each year.

== Building work ==
It is now fully restored, thanks to a funding campaign in May 2013 and seats 214. The final amount raised well exceeded the initial £122,500 expected, and they were able to undertake building work to create two bars, a new box office and update other facilities. In 2016, money bequeathed by Paul Iles allowed the theatre to renovate an existing building which is now used as the main youth theatre rehearsal space and known as The Paul Iles Learning Centre.

== Youth theatre ==
The youth theatre at The Georgian Theatre Royal is run by former Lucy Booton and has between 130–150 students enrolled at any one time. They teach two main disciplines (acting and musical theatre) across three age groups, from 6 years to adult. They perform annually in the auditorium and produce all shows in-house. The youth theatre also produces new works performed at the Edinburgh Fringe Festival, written by Shields. In 2018 they performed the award-winning new play This Is Yorkshire and in 2019 they premiered a new adaptation of an Oscar Wilde classic titled Dorian Gray. The Youth Theatre was commissioned by English Heritage to perform new work at Richmond Castle for the centenary of Armistice Day on 11 November 2018 as part of "Richmond Remembers".

== See also ==
- Grade I listed buildings in North Yorkshire (district)
- Listed buildings in Richmond, North Yorkshire
