= CPP Group =

British company selling life assistance products

CPP Group plc
- Type: Public company
- Industry: Life assistance
- Founded: 14 April 1980; 46 years ago
- Founder: Hamish Ogston
- Headquarters: Leeds, United Kingdom
- Key people: David Morrison (Chairman); Simon Pyper, (Chief executive officer)
- Revenue: £143.6 million (2021)
- Operating income: £134.8 million (2021)
- Net income: £27.2 million (2021)
- Website: international.cppgroup.com

CPP Group plc is a provider of card protection insurance. It is headquartered in Leeds, UK. It is listed on the Alternative Investment Market.

== History ==
=== Formation ===
The company was founded by Hamish Ogston on 14 April 1980 as a provider of card protection insurance. It acquired its Homecare Insurance and Mobile Phone Insurance businesses in 2001, Metris Enhancement Services in 2003 and Leapfrog Group in 2009.

Having listed on the London Stock Exchange in March 2010, CPP moved to Alternative Investment Market in February 2015.

Sir Richard Douglas Lapthorne, Nicholas Ian Cooper and Mark William Hamlin joined CPP on 5 May 2016 replacing the previous board after a 'General Meeting' was requested by shareholder, Schroder Investment Management Limited.

In March 2017, CPP acquired Blink Innovation: the only InsureTech business in the FCA's prestigious 'Project Innovate' sandbox.

=== Acquisitions and growth ===
In September 2019, CPP Group UK, part of CPP Group Plc, acquired the insurance broker, Business & Domestic Insurance Services (B&D) from Motorway Direct Plc.

In September 2018 CPP Group announced an investment in the Indian business process management (BPM) company, Globiva. CPP invested £2m for a 61% stake in the business.

In June 2018 CPP Group announced the acquisition of Valeos, a specialist consultancy providing value-added services and products to companies in the insurance sector. Valeos was founded by CEO David Ross in Yorkshire in 2014.

In March 2018 CPP Group announced a £1.2m investment to take a shareholding in the cyber risk start up KYND. In January 2022 KYND announced that it secured £3.25m of investment from Business Growth Capital (also known as the British Growth Fund).

In March 2017 CPP Group acquired Blink Innovation, an insurtech start-up within the travel insurance industry. In November 2020, Blink Parametric was included in the InsurTech100 list.

=== Delisting ===
In July 2026, the company announced plans to delisted from the Alternative Investment Market and to go privateto support the growth of Blink Parametric.

== Senior management ==
The chairman, Sir Richard Lapthorne, retired on 31 January 2021. He was succeeded as chairman by existing non-executive director, David Morrison. On 8 February 2022, CPP Group announced that CEO Jason Walsh. His successor was Simon Pyper, the former Chief Financial Officer.

== FSA Probe ==
On 29 March 2011 the company announced that the Financial Services Authority had launched an investigation into the sale of one of its products to UK customers. The Financial Services Authority's investigation centred on allegations that CPP overstated the risk of identity theft when selling insurance for that purpose.

On 20 February 2012 CPP announced that its shares had been suspended on the London Stock Exchange for a two-week period to allow for negotiations with the FSA to take place. CPP maintained that the proposed redress for alleged mis-selling would force the company to close and that the action being demanded by the FSA was disproportionate. On 25 February 2012 an announcement was made indicating that a compromise agreement had been reached. This was reported as being expected to cost CPP in the region of £10–15 million. CPP shares were re-listed on 27 March 2012.

In the following week a number of MPs voiced their concerns about the way in which the FSA's review had been carried out and the impact that closing the company would have on the staff and the local economies in the areas that CPP's offices are based.

As part of the investigation, the FSA has stated that the referral partners including the high street banks will also be investigated and that the number of consumers affected by this mis-selling scandal could be significantly higher.

The redress scheme to compensate for the mis-selling the products took place from January 2014 until August 2014 and by 5 March 2015, the scheme administrators paid £451m of compensation to 2.37 million claimants, an average of £190 per claim
