= Vezey Raffety =

English cricketer (1906–1991)

Personal information
- Full name: Cairns Vezey Raffety
- Born: 9 August 1906; Orpington, Kent, England
- Died: 28 September 1991 (aged 85); Eastbourne, Sussex, England
- Batting: Left-handed
- Bowling: Slow left-arm orthodox

Domestic team information
- Years: Team
- 1931: Minor Counties
- 1924–1932: Buckinghamshire

Career statistics
Competition	First-class
Matches	1
Runs scored	16
Batting average	16.00
100s/50s	–/–
Top score	16
Balls bowled	–
Wickets	–
Bowling average	–
5 wickets in innings	–
10 wickets in match	–
Best bowling	–
Catches/stumpings	1/–
- Source: Cricinfo, 3 June 2011

Cairns Vezey Raffety (9 August 1906 – 28 September 1991) was an English cricketer. He was a left-handed batsman who bowled slow left-arm orthodox. He was born in Orpington, Kent and educated at Cranleigh School, where he represented the school cricket team.

Raffety made his debut for Buckinghamshire in the 1924 Minor Counties Championship against the Leicestershire Second XI. Raffety played Minor counties cricket for Buckinghamshire from 1924 to 1932, making 17 appearances.

Raffety made his only first-class appearance for the Minor Counties cricket team against the touring New Zealanders in 1931. In his only innings in the match, he was dismissed for 16 by Tom Lowry.

Raffety died on 28 September 1991, aged 85, in Eastbourne.
