= Vivian Cox =

British film producer, writer and schoolteacher (1915–2009)

Vivian Cox (1915 – 2009) was a British film producer and writer, and school teacher. He worked for Rank Studios between 1959 and 1967. Between 1960 and 1976, he produced the stage shows supporting the Royal Command Film Performance. From 1967 to 1975, he taught at the Cranleigh School.

== Select films ==
- So Long at the Fair (1950)
- Tread Softly (1952)
- Father Brown (1954)
- The Prisoner (1955)
- Tears for Simon (1956)
- House of Secrets (1956)
- Bachelor of Hearts (1958)
- Two Way Stretch (1960)
- We Joined the Navy (1962)
