= Nicholas Dimbleby =

British sculptor (1946–2024)

Nicholas Dimbleby (8 August 1946 – 10 February 2024) was a British sculptor.

== Early life and education ==
Dimbleby was born in Sussex, England, the third of four children to broadcaster Richard Dimbleby and his wife, Dilys (née Thomas). He grew up on a farm and experienced mild dyslexia and acute astigmatism, which influenced his interest in sculpture.

Dimbleby received his early education from Cranleigh School and later studied sculpture at Edinburgh College of Art and later attended Goldsmiths College.

== Career ==
Dimbleby began his career as an assistant to abstract sculptor William Pye in London. After briefly living in rural France, he returned to the UK and established a studio in Devon, where he settled permanently. He worked on public and private projects, including portraits of sports personalities such as rugby player Jonny Wilkinson and rower Steve Redgrave. He also produced private commissions for the British royal family, including a lifecast of Lady Louise Windsor for her parents, Prince Edward and Sophie, Duchess of Edinburgh, and several pieces commissioned by King Charles III when he was Prince of Wales. He also created sculpture of Captain Cook on High Green, Great Ayton.

Other major public sculptures by Dimbleby included a memorial for his father Richard Dimbleby, unveiled at Westminster Abbey in 1990, and a memorial commissioned by the Royal College of Physicians in 2022 honoring doctors who died during the COVID-19 pandemic, unveiled by Professor Sir Chris Whitty.

== Personal life ==
Dimbleby married Kay, a music teacher, in 1971. The couple had four children and lived in a manor house in Clyst Hydon, Devon, initially co-owned with his brother Jonathan. Following his youngest daughter's leukemia diagnosis in 1990, his wife Kay shifted from teaching to textile and quilt design.

Dimbleby was diagnosed with motor neurone disease later in life and died on 10 February 2024, aged 77.
