= Nitin Passi =

British entrepreneur

- Born: November 1982 (age 43)
- Occupation: Businessperson
- Known for: Founder of Missguided

Nitin Passi (born November 1982) is a British entrepreneur and the founder of fashion retailer Missguided and brand management platform Sumwon Studios. In 2019, The Sunday Times Rich List estimated his net worth at £250 million. Sumwon Studios, established in 2023, operates under a buy-and-build strategy, acquiring and scaling lifestyle and fashion brands including Missguided and Dutch label Balr.

== Early life ==
Born in Cheshire, Passi grew up in Surrey and Hong Kong and briefly lived in New York. His grandfather moved to the UK from India in the 1960s and set up a knitwear factory.

Passi went to Cranleigh School and Newcastle University, where he studied business management.

After graduation, he worked for his father's fashion wholesaler.

== Career ==
After founding Missguided in 2009 and leading its growth into a global fast-fashion business, Passi stepped down in 2022 following the company’s administration. In June 2023, Shein acquired the Missguided brand, with operations licensed to Passi’s new venture, Sumwon Studios, a Dubai-based brand platform he founded the same year.

Sumwon Studios operates a “buy-and-build” strategy focused on acquiring and scaling direct-to-consumer lifestyle brands through digital storytelling and global distribution. Strategic investors include Shein.

In 2025, the company acquired Balr., the Dutch lifestyle and football-inspired brand, following its bankruptcy proceedings. Passi described the acquisition as an opportunity to reposition Balr. “at the intersection of football, fashion and lifestyle.” Sumwon Studios stated that it was on track to exceed US$400 million in revenue in the same year.

== Personal life ==
Passi was born in November 1982. He is based between the United Kingdom and Dubai, where Sumwon Studios is headquartered.
