= David Emms =

English educationalist, and rugby union player

David Acfield Emms OBE (16 February 1925 – 21 December 2015) was an English schoolmaster, educationalist and rugby union player.

== Early life ==
David Acfield Emms was born on 16 February 1925, the son of Archibald George Emms and Winifred Gladys Emms (née Richards). He was educated at Tonbridge School and then served during the Second World War in the Royal Artillery from 1943 until 1947. In 1947 he went on to Brasenose College, Oxford to study Modern Languages and received a BA Hons in 1950. In that year he also married Pamela Baker Speed with whom he had three sons and a daughter.

As a Rugby Union player, Emms played for Oxford University RFC in 1949 and 1950 in the Varsity Match. He went on to play for Northampton from 1951 to 1956, and the Eastern Counties from 1951 to 1957, captaining them in 1957. He once played for the Barbarians in 1952.

== Career ==
Having received a Diploma in Education in 1951, Emms became an Assistant Master at Uppingham School. While there, he became Head of Modern Languages and also the Commanding Officer of the school's Combined Cadet Force. In 1960, he took up the post of Headmaster of Cranleigh School where he remained until 1970. From 1970 to 1974 he was Headmaster of Sherborne School, and in 1975 he took up the position of Master at Dulwich College. Whilst at Dulwich College he was Chairman of the Headmasters' Conference in 1984, President of the Alleyn Club in 1985, and Deputy Chairman of the English-Speaking Union from 1984 until 1989. He retired from the Mastership of Dulwich College in 1986.

After his retirement from Dulwich College, Emms became Director of the London Goodenough Trust for Overseas Graduates (1987 to 1995). He became Chairman of the Joint Educational Trust in 1987 (until 1990) as well as president of the Brasenose Society, President of ISCO in 2001, a member of the Committee of the GBA from 1989 to 1992 and Vice Chairman of the Council and Deputy Pro-Chancellor of City University from 1989 to 1991. He also was a member of the council of the Fairbridge Society from 1984 to 1996, was admitted as a Fellow of the Royal Society of Arts in 1988, a Freeman of the City of London and Master, Skinners' Company in 1987 (until 1988).

In 2013, Emms came to the defence of Nigel Farage, when he was accused of being racist during his time at Dulwich College. Emms said of Farage's behaviour: "It was naughtiness, not racism" and stated he was "proved right" to have made Farage a prefect.

Emms was also a governor of various schools during his career including Feltonfleet (Cobham), St Felix School (Southwold), The Portsmouth Grammar School, St Dunstan's College, and until 2000, his old school Tonbridge School.

He was also a member of several clubs including the East India Devonshire Sports and Public Schools Club, as well as Vincent's Club, Oxford, a University of Oxford gentlemen's club.

== Honours ==
Emms became an Officer of the Order of the British Empire (OBE) in 1995.

== Publications ==
- HMC Schools and British Industry, 1981

Academic offices
Preceded by Charles W Lloyd	Master of Dulwich College; 1975–1986	Succeeded by Anthony Verity
