= John Worrall (RAF officer) =

- Born: 9 April 1911
- Died: 14 January 1988 (aged 76)
- Military career
- Allegiance: United Kingdom
- Branch: Royal Air Force
- Service years: 1930–1963
- Rank: Air Vice Marshal
- Nickname: "Barron"
- Units: No. 1 Squadron RAF (1931–33); No. 208 Squadron RAF (1933–36)
- Commands: RAF Kai Tak (1949–52); RAF West Malling (1948–49); RAF Ras-El-Ma (1943–44); No. 32 Squadron (1940)
- Conflicts: Second World War: Battle of Britain
- Awards: Companion of the Order of the Bath; Distinguished Flying Cross; Mentioned in Despatches

Air Vice Marshal John "Barron" Worrall, CB, DFC (9 April 1911 – 14 January 1988) was a Royal Air Force pilot who, during the Second World War, led No. 32 Squadron in the Battle of Britain, flying the Hawker Hurricane.

== RAF career ==
=== Early years ===
Worrall joined the RAF in 1930 and was granted permanent status on 19 December 1931, in the rank of pilot officer. He represented the RAF College at Hockey. Worrall initially joined No. 1 Squadron, and then transferred to No. 208 Squadron on 28 February 1933. In 1936, he went to China, where he attended the School of Oriental Studies at Peking University.

=== Second World War ===
Worrall was recalled and posted to No. 32 Squadron RAF in May 1940. While based at Biggin Hill and Hawkinge, Worrall participated in the Battle of Britain, commanding No. 32 Squadron. Under his leadership, by the end of August 1940, No. 32 Squadron had claimed 71 enemy aircraft shot down for five pilots killed. By the end of August, No. 32 Squadron had destroyed 102 enemy aircraft. In early August 1940 Worrall was awarded the Distinguished Flying Cross (DFC).

Soon afterwards Worrall became a Fighter Controller at Biggin Hill's control room.

Worrall's only personal score was a half share, made on 31 August 1940. He was shot down only once on 20 July 1940, obliging him to a forced landing near Hawkinge in Hurricane Mk. I, N2532.

In March 1944 Wing Commander Worrall was Senior Air Staff Officer at Headquarters No. 216 Group.

=== Post-war ===
In July 1945, Worrall became Senior Personnel Staff Officer at Headquarters Transport Command. He continued to serve in the RAF after the war, rising to the rank of air vice marshal. He retired on 1 January 1963.

Following retirement from the RAF, Worrall became managing director of The Advertising Agency Poster Bureau Ltd in 1964 and 1965.
