= Cranleigh School =

Independent school in South East England

Coordinates: 51.150°N 0.494°W

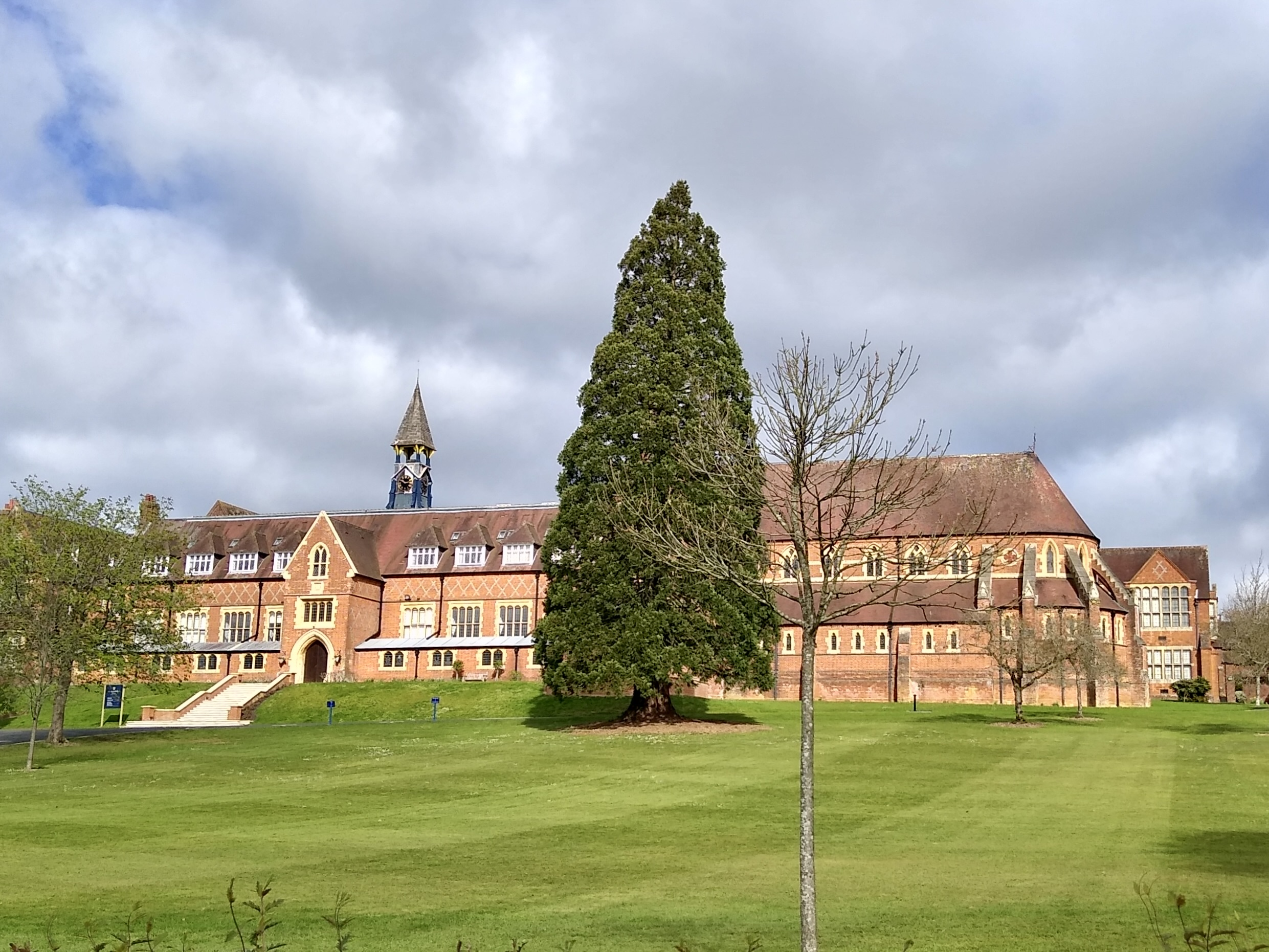
- Cranleigh School from the south-east in 2026

Location
- Horseshoe Lane; Cranleigh, Surrey, GU6 8QQ; England

Information
- Type: Independent boarding and day school
- Motto: Latin: Ex cultu robur, lit. 'From culture strength'
- Religious affiliation: Church of England
- Established: 1865
- Department for Education URN: 125323 Tables
- Head: Samantha Price
- Gender: Mixed
- Age: 13 to 18
- Enrollment: 680 pupils
- Houses: Eight
- Colours: Yellow, navy blue, white
- Alumni: Old Cranleighans
- Website: www.cranleigh.org

Listed Building – Grade II
- Official name: Cranleigh School, Woodyer Buildings
- Designated: 20 July 1993
- Reference no.: 1044323

Cranleigh School is an independent, co-educational, boarding and day school for pupils aged 13–19 in South East England. Opened in 1865, it remains on its original campus, around 1 mile (1.6 kilometres) north of the centre of Cranleigh, Surrey. In March 2025, the school, together with the associated prep school, educated a total of 961 pupils between the ages of 7 and 19, of whom 575 were boarders. The current Head is Samantha Price. The school has international campuses in the United Arab Emirates and China.

The earliest proposals for the school were put forward in 1862 by George Cubitt, the MP for West Surrey, and John Sapte, the local parish priest. Henry Woodyer was commissioned to design the buildings and the foundation stone was laid in 1863. Cranleigh School opened to male pupils on 29 September 1865, although the original quad was not finished until 1867. The chapel and dining hall were completed two years later. These original buildings, all designed by Woodyer, were Grade II listed in July 1993.

From an initial total of around 150 boys in 1866, numbers in the school reached 280 by 1892. A joint application with St Catherine's School, Bramley, for a royal charter was made in 1897. The charter was granted the following year, establishing the Corporation of the Cranleigh and Bramley Schools. A major expansion of the school campus began in the early 1910s, with the purchase of additional land and the opening of new science laboratories. Two buildings designed by Edwin Cooper were completed in 1929, providing additional dormitories and a purpose-built auditorium. The first day girls began studying at Cranleigh School in 1971, and the first female boarders were admitted to the sixth form three years later. The school became fully coeducational in 1999.

== History ==
=== Foundation and opening ===
The earliest proposals for a boarding school at Cranleigh, were put forward in 1862 by George Cubitt, the MP for West Surrey, and John Sapte, the local parish priest. A committee of 16 met that November at the Abbot's Hospital in Guildford to develop a prospectus for the new institution. The name "Surrey County School" was chosen and an eight-acre (3.2 ha) site was identified, which Cubitt agreed to purchase. The overriding aim was to provide "a sound and thorough public school education, on the principles of the Church of England, for the sons of farmers and others throughout the agricultural districts of Surrey." The motto, Latin: Ex cultu robur, lit. 'From culture strength', was chosen by Edward White Benson, a member of the founding committee and later the archbishop of Canterbury.

An appeal for funds was made in April 1863, with an initial target of £7000 (equivalent to £760,000 in 2025) to provide a school for 100 pupils. By the summer, half of this total had been raised, enabling the committee to commission Henry Woodyer to design the new buildings. The foundation stone was laid by Charles Longley, archbishop of Canterbury, on 25 November 1863, and Joseph Merriman, a fellow of St John's College, Cambridge, was appointed the first headmaster in early 1865. Robert Quick, who had previously taught at the Royal Grammar School, Guildford, and Hurstpierpoint College, was chosen as Merriman's deputy.

The school opened to students on 29 September 1865, although the formal opening ceremony did not take place until 12 October. By that date, only the south and east sides of the quad had been completed, which provided a school hall and two classrooms on the ground floor, with dormitories and accommodation for teachers on the first and second floors. Two further classrooms were in temporary use as the dining hall and chapel. Of the 25 pupils who had enrolled in advance, only 18 attended on the first day, but by the summer of 1866, the numbers had increased to 150. The remaining sides of the quad were completed the following year, and the chapel and dining hall were added in 1869.

=== Late 19th century ===
Merriman continued as headmaster until 1892, during which period the number of pupils increased to over 300. Under his leadership, a new library building was opened in 1874, and six years later, partly in response to an outbreak of scarlet fever, a sanatorium was constructed, funded by Cubitt. Merriman retired to take up the living of Freshwater on the Isle of Wight and was succeeded by George Allen, also a graduate of St John's College, Cambridge, and a former teacher at Wellington and Dulwich Colleges.

During the late 1890s, changes were made to governing structure of the school. The founders had originally chosen the name "Surrey County School", but in 1897, it was amended to "Cranleigh School (Surrey County)" to reflect common usage. A joint application with St Catherine's School, Bramley, was made to secure a royal charter, which was granted on 8 June 1898. Under its terms, the Corporation of the Cranleigh and Bramley Schools was established to assume ownership of the land on which the two institutions were built. Running of the schools continued as before, with operational powers delegated to separate boards of governors. John Honey, a historian of 19th-century education, writes that "by the end of the Victorian period, Cranleigh had gained acceptance among what were perhaps the top fifty public schools [in the country]".

=== Early 20th century ===
The number of pupils at Cranleigh School declined throughout George Allen's tenure as headmaster, decreasing from 280 in the Summer Term of 1892 to 173 in October 1908. Allen blamed inadequate science facilities and teaching, which he had been unable to improve owing to the fall in income from fees. He resigned in July 1908 to become parish priest of Send near Woking.

Charles Tyler, a graduate of Pembroke College, Cambridge, who had previously taught at Charterhouse and Rossall Schools, was appointed headmaster in December 1908 and took up the post the following month. He proposed a programme of improvement for the school buildings and facilities, with the aim of reversing the decline in student numbers. The expenditure of £600 (equivalent to £62,000 in 2025) was approved, but by the end of 1909 the cost had almost doubled to £1100. Relations between Tyler and the staff started to deteriorate, and the bursar and six teachers left within four terms of Tyler's arrival. The governors began to lose faith in his leadership and even considered closing the school. By the Summer Term of 1910, the number of pupils had dropped to 154, and the governors decided the following May that a new headmaster should be appointed. Tyler resigned a few days later and formally left his post at the end of the term.

Herbert Rhodes was appointed headmaster in July 1911 and began a major expansion of the school site and improvement in its facilities, some of which had been planned by Tyler. New science laboratories were opened in July 1912, the school purchased an additional 17 acres (6.9 ha) of land and the construction of the new preparatory school on the south side of Horseshoe Lane began in February of the following year. In the three years from January 1912 to December 1914, the number of students rose from 168 to 287.

Over 800 former pupils served in the armed forces during the First World War, including Charles Townshend, who commanded the 6th Division of the British Indian Army during the Mesopotamian Campaign, and James Gordon Legge, who was the Chief of the General Staff of the Australian Army. Cranleigh schoolmasters serving in the British Army included John Stanley Purvis, who fought at the Battle of the Somme and wrote the poems High Wood and Chance Memory, and Robert Moline, later the archbishop of Perth, who was awarded the Military Cross. In total, 133 former pupils lost their lives, of whom 15 left Cranleigh after the start of the war. A school war memorial, a white stone cenotaph outside the main entrance, was donated by Hudson Kearley, 1st Viscount Devonport and an Old Cranleighan, and was unveiled in July 1921.

Rhodes continued as headmaster until 1931. Under his leadership, major improvements to the school buildings took place in the 1920s, including the opening refurbishment of two ground floor classrooms to provide a new library and reading room. The Connaught Block, designed by Edwin Cooper and containing additional dormitories, opened in 1929, as did the Devonport Speech Hall, which he also designed. The chapel organ was replaced, a new Headmaster's House and school armoury were built, and electric lighting was installed throughout.

The Guildford–Horsham railway line was opened on 2 October 1865, three days after the school. In the mid-1930s, the Southern Railway introduced the SR V "Schools" class locomotives, all of which were named after public schools. The 37th member of the class, Cranleigh (originally numbered 936), was constructed in June 1935 and was exhibited at Cranleigh station that October. Cranleigh was withdrawn from passenger service in December 1962, and the railway line closed in June 1965.

After leading the school for 20 years, Herbert Rhodes left Cranleigh School at the end of the Lent Term 1931. His successor, David Loveday, was immediately presented with the effects of the Great Depression, which resulted in a decline in pupil numbers from around 300 at the end of the 1920s to about 230 in 1934. The pay of teachers was cut in 1932 and the fund for scholarships, which had been introduced in 1929, was reduced. By 1936, the financial position of the school had improved sufficiently to allow money to be raised to build new squash courts, which were opened the following year.

The school began to prepare for the Second World War in January 1939, when a meeting of housemasters discussed the possibility of air raids. That March, a fire-fighting squad of teachers and pupils was formed, and blackout blinds were prepared over the course of the summer. In May 1940, several teachers and older boys joined the Home Guard. That September, each house was provided with an air raid shelter and the dormitories were moved to the ground floor. During the war, vegetable allotments were planted by the pavilion, the golf course became a hay field and around half of the pupils assisted local farmers with the harvest during the holidays. In August 1944, the school buildings sustained minor damage when a V-1 flying bomb landed on one of the playing fields.

Among the former pupils serving in the Second World War were George Kitching, who commanded the 4th Canadian Division at the Normandy landings, and John Worrall, who led No. 32 Squadron RAF during the Battle of Britain. Out of 25 teaching staff in post at the school in 1939, 14 were called up for active service. In total, 138 Old Cranleighans died during the Second World War, and the school created a war memorial at one end of the Reading Room, honouring both them and those who had died in the First World War, dedicated in June 1949.

=== Late 20th century ===
Loveday continued as headmaster until April 1954, when he became the archdeacon of Dorking. He was succeeded by Henry March, who had previously been a teacher at Charterhouse School. March attempted to raise academic standards and to improve exam results. He also introduced art to the curriculum and encouraged the development of the school's musical activities. However, his relationship with the teaching staff was poor and he resigned in April 1959 after five years in post. March's deputy, H. P. Jacob, served as acting headmaster for the next four terms.

David Emms, previously a teacher at Uppingham School, took up the position of headmaster in September 1960. Fagging, the practice of junior boys acting as personal servants to senior pupils, was abolished at Cranleigh School in 1964.

Emms left in 1970 to become headmaster of Sherborne School and was succeeded by Mark Van Hasselt. That November, the teaching staff voted unanimously in favour of educating female pupils, and three day girls transferred to the sixth form from St Catherine's School, Bramley, the following year. The first female boarders at Cranleigh arrived in September 1974 and were initially given accommodation on the top floor of the Headmaster's House. By the start of the 1975–76 academic year, girls comprised 11% of the sixth form, rising to over 20% in 1980. Girls were first admitted to Year 9 (at age 13) in 1999.

=== 21st century ===
In 2009, the Good Schools Guide described the school as 'an all-rounder’s paradise, yes, but the academic offering can stand up to almost any school in the land'.

The school's academic block, the van Hasselt Centre was opened by Kate Adie, the Trevor Abbott Sports Centre was opened by Sir Richard Branson and the West House was opened by Baroness Greenfield. Recent building projects have included two academic blocks, two girls' boarding houses, refurbishment of the art studios, and a remodelled entrance.

Cranleigh School also has a sister school based in Abu Dhabi which opened in September 2014 and three schools in China.

== Buildings ==
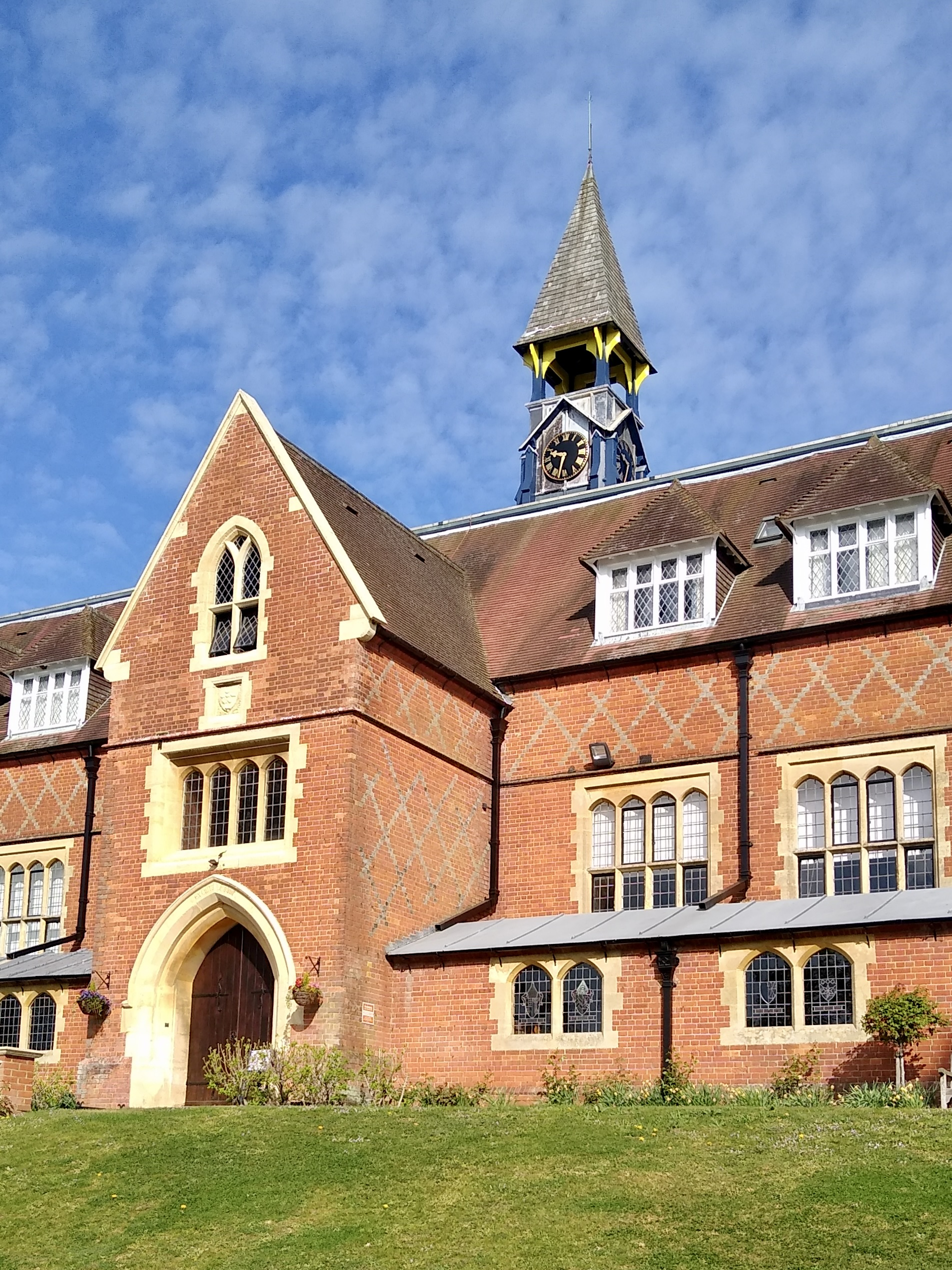
The south entrance to the quad with bell tower above

The first buildings to be constructed at Cranleigh School were the south and east ranges of the quad, which were completed for the opening of the school in 1865. They were designed by Henry Woodyer and are built of red brick in a Tudor Gothic style. The two-storey structure housed classrooms and accommodation for teachers on the ground floor, with dormitories for the students above. The western wing of the south range included accommodation for the headmaster. The quad was enclosed in 1867–68, when the north and west ranges were completed. The additional buildings included kitchen, additional living accommodation for teachers and three fives courts. In 1870, a bell tower housing a clock was added above the main south entrance. Glazed cloisters provide a covered walkway around the perimeter of the quad, the open interior of which was originally paved. The quad and chapel were Grade II listed on 20 July 1993.

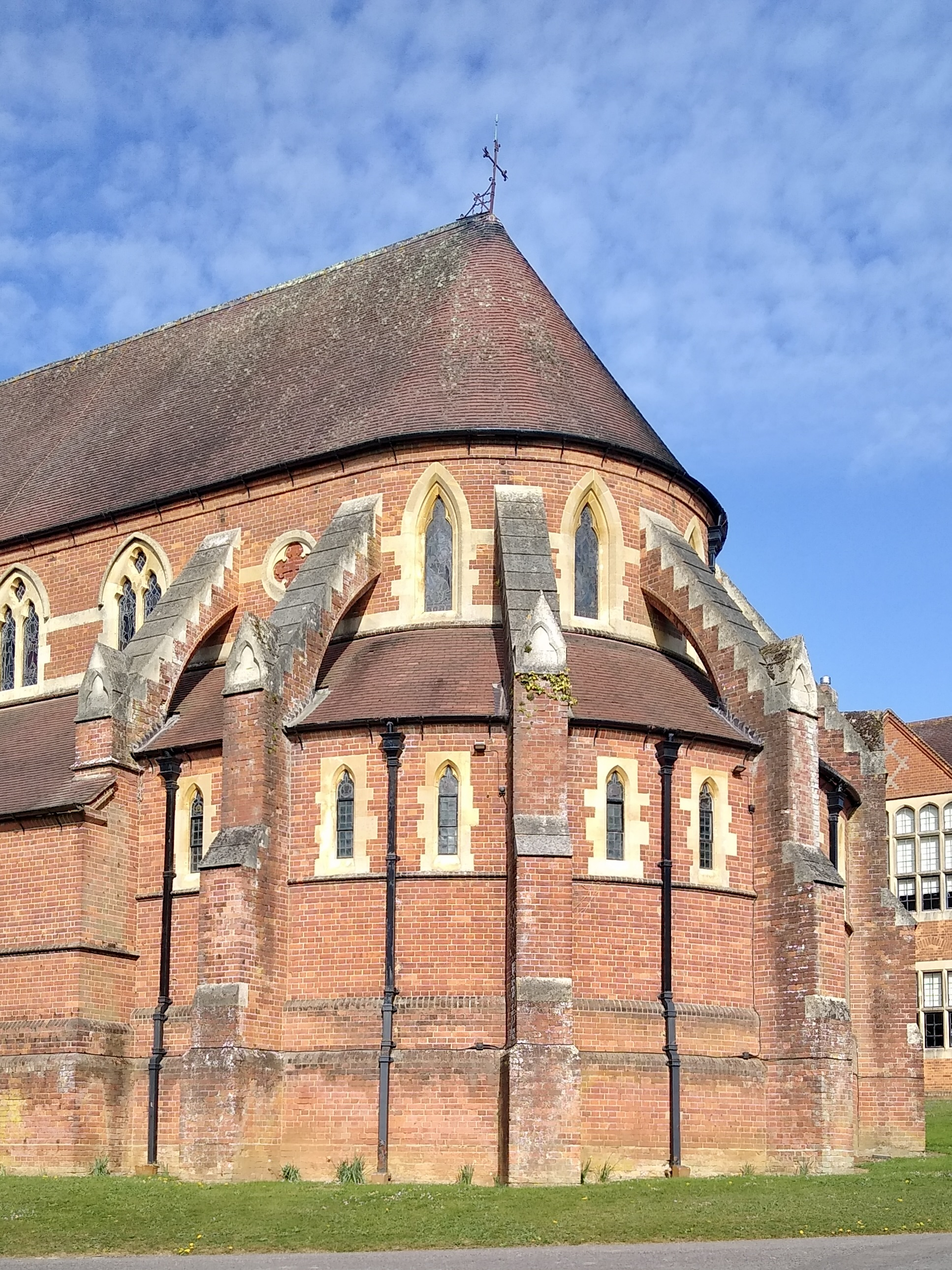
The east end of the chapel

The chapel, also designed by Woodyer, was built as an extension to the south-eastern corner of the quad. Constructed in 1868–69, it is built of red brick in the early decorated style. The east end of the chapel is a semi-circular apse, supported by external flying buttresses. Inside, an ambulatory passage runs behind the curved reredos, which was carved in 1881 by Thomas Nicholls. The clerestory, above the nave, is supported on columns of stone from the Forest of Dean. At the west end is an ante-chapel, and the south transept features a rose window and arched entrance doorway. The school war memorial, in front of the entrance to the south transept, was dedicated in 2016. It consists of a bronze figure of a boy sculpted by Nicholas Dimbleby, surrounded by glass panels bearing the names of former pupils who have died in war.

The Dining Hall, to the west of the original quad, was also designed by Woodyer. It measures 100 ft × 30 ft (30.5 m × 9.1 m) and a shield bearing the architect's arms is attached to the northern exterior wall. The fireplace, in the centre of one of the side walls, bears the date 1869 and is inscribed with the words "Warm Heart Makyth Warm Hearth". The ceiling is supported by wooden tie beams, and above the high table are the stained-glass Founders' Windows, donated by Cubitt.

The Connaught Building was designed by Edwin Cooper and is named after Arthur, Duke of Connaught, the third son of Queen Victoria. The three-storey brick building was designed in the neo-Georgian style to provide additional teaching rooms and student accommodation. It was opened in July 1929 by Randall Davidson, who had retired from the post of archbishop of Canterbury the previous year. In 1972, an existing corridor was converted to become a permanent art gallery and exhibition space.

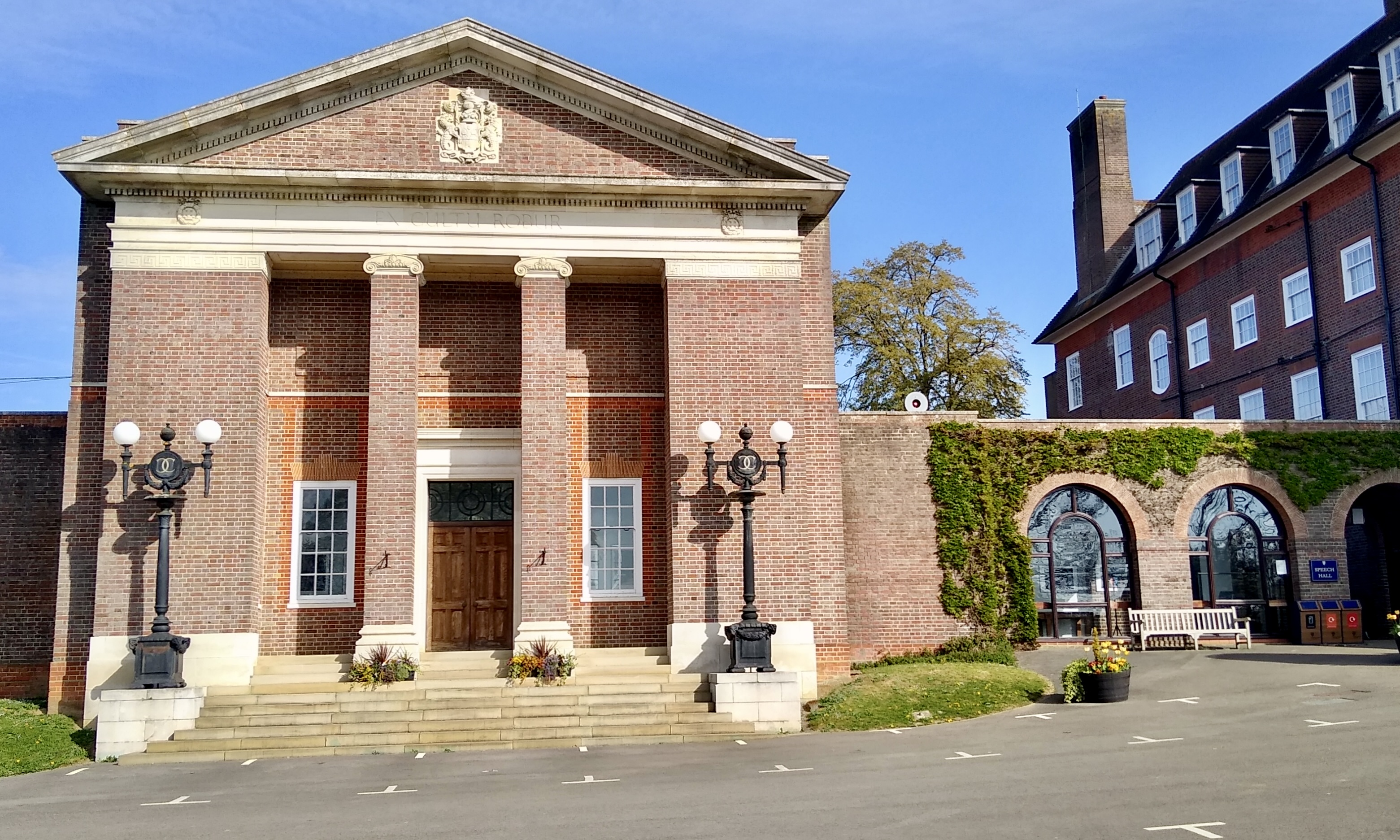
The south portico of the Devonport Speech Hall

The adjacent Devonport Speech Hall was also designed by Cooper and opened on the same day. It is named after Hudson Kearley, 1st Viscount Devonport, who paid the architect's fees for both the hall and the Connaught Building. At the northern end of the hall is a stage with a proscenium arch, and the main auditorium is separated from aisles on either side by a series of Doric columns. The Vivian Cox Theatre, a studio theatre, was opened in 1991 by John Mills. It was built as an extension to the speech hall and was named after Vivian Cox, an Old Cranleighan and former teacher at the school.

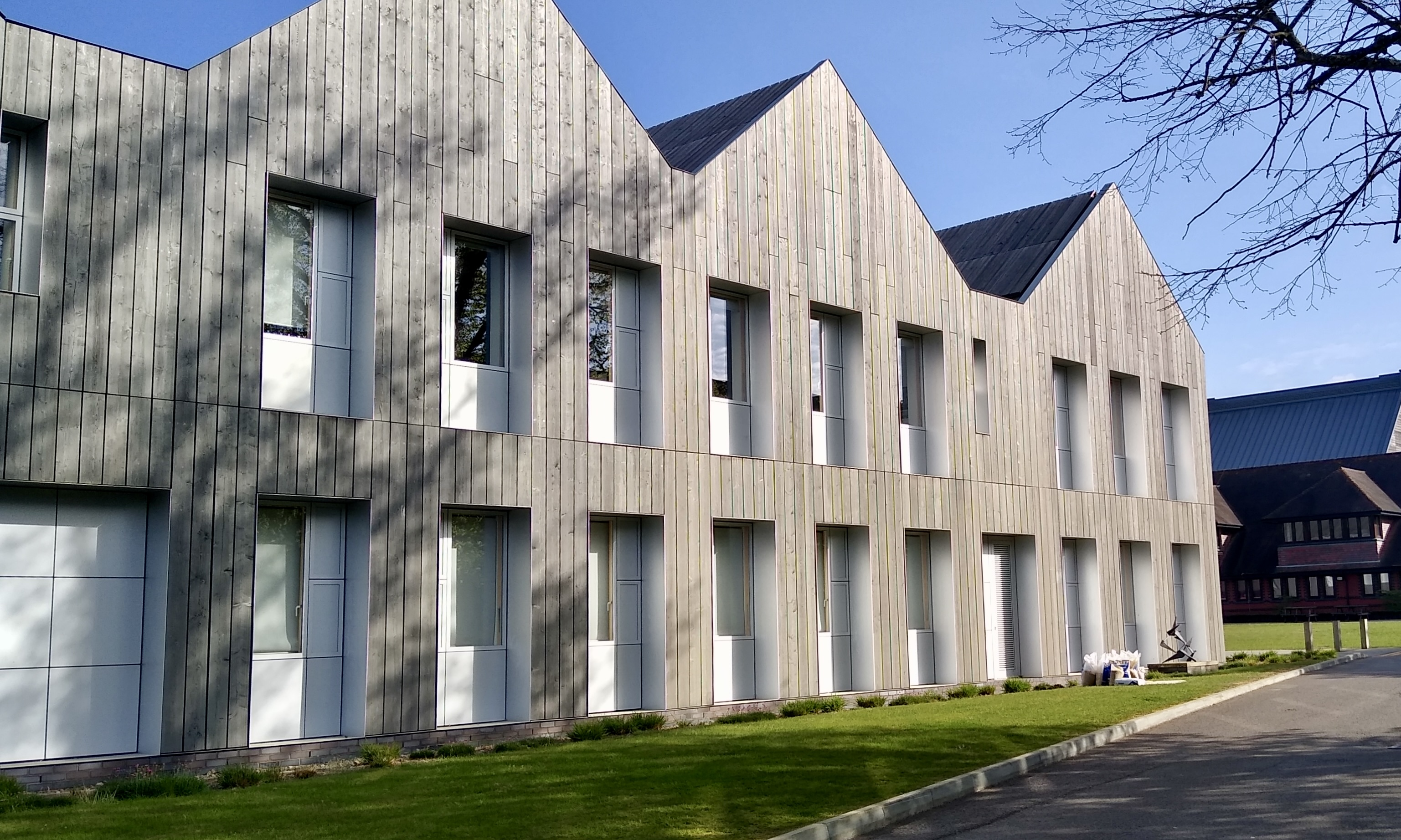
The Van Hasselt Centre

The Emms Centre, designed by Pringle Richards Sharratt was completed in 2009 and provides teaching facilities for science, maths and modern languages. The Van Hasselt Centre, designed by Allies and Morrison is named after a previous headmaster. It was opened in April 2019 by Tessa, Marc van Hasselt's widow, and Kate Adie a former BBC journalist. The timber-clad structure houses the Leggett Library, twenty-four new classrooms and a café. The design incorporates and retains four existing squash courts, which were repurposed to form social spaces.

== Houses ==
When the school opened in the 1860s, boarders were accommodated on the first and second floors of the original quad. The following decade, the smaller dormitories in the south and east wings were paired, giving rise to the house names "1 and 4 South", "2 and 3 South", and "1 and 2 East". The larger dormitories, "West", above the dining hall, and "1 North" and "2 North", in the north wing of the quad, were never amalgamated or subdivided. The boys were supervised by unmarried male teachers, who lived in adjacent rooms. Alan Megahey, a historian of Cranleigh School, likens this arrangement of sleeping accommodation to a "hostel" system, in contrast to the late 20th and early 21st century system of boarding houses.

The modernisation of boarding at Cranleigh began in the 1960s, with the opening of Cubitt House, created by converting the former sanatorium, and the construction of North House. Loveday House was built in the 1980s and, in the same decade, the sleeping accommodation in the original quad was subject to a major refurbishment and redevelopment project. South House was established as a girls boarding house in 1999, the year that the school became fully coeducational. Two years later, the purpose-built West House was opened to accommodate the growing number of female boarders. Two further girls' houses were opened in the 2010s.

In 2025, all students at Cranleigh School, whether day pupils or boarders, are members of a house. There are eight houses in total, four for boys (Cubitt, East, Loveday and North), and four for girls (Martlet, Rhodes, South and West). Each house has a resident housemaster or housemistress, a resident deputy, a non-resident deputy and two matrons.

- Cubitt House, for boys, was established in September 1961 in the building that had previously been the school sanatorium. Initially it housed around 60 boys, but in 2025 it accommodates around 100. It is named after George Cubitt, one of the original founders, who had also paid for the construction of the sanatorium building in 1880.
- East House, for boys, occupies part of the original quad. An additional dormitory was opened in 1995.
- Loveday House, for boys, was completed in 1980 and was officially opened in 1981. It is named after David Loveday, a previous headmaster, and is built around a central quad. High Upfold, a detached part of the house, accommodates some of the more senior boys and includes a separate common room, which was converted from an 18th-century barn.
- Martlet House, for girls, was opened in 2019 and occupies parts of the Connaught Block and the original quad. It is named after the birds that appear on the school coat of arms.
- North House, for boys, was officially opened in 1965 and initially accommodated 55 boarders and five day pupils, who were relocated from the original quad. Members of the house join with the girls of West House for social activities.
- Rhodes House, for girls, was completed in 2017 and was formally opened the following year. It occupies a part of the originally quad that was previously West House.
- South House, for girls, occupies part of the Connaught Block and opened in 1999. It accommodates around 120 boarders and day pupils.
- West House, for girls, was opened to pupils in 2001, although the formal ceremony took place the following year.

== Co-curricular activities ==
=== Sport ===
Association football was played in the first two terms after the school opened in 1865 and was the main winter sport until the First World War. Initially the number of students was so low, that teachers were required to participate in games until the late 1880s. Matches were played on a sloping field immediately to the east of the main entrance from Horseshoe Lane and on a flatter field near the Cranleigh village rectory. Cricket was introduced in the summer term of 1865 and matches took place on the village cricket field on Cranleigh Common. Fives was introduced in 1867, with the completion of three courts as part of the original quad.

When the school opened in 1865, a tiled corridor in the south wing of the quad was initially used for gymnastics. The first permanent gymnasium was built in 1874, and was extended in 1897 to mark the Diamond Jubilee of Queen Victoria, allowing the building to be used as a speech and assembly hall. Throughout the 1890s, Cranleigh School teams performed strongly in the gymnastics competition for public school pupils hosted at Aldershot Barracks, winning the competition four times between 1892 and 1895, and coming second in 1898 and 1899. John Honey credits this success with enhancing the reputation and standing of Cranleigh among public schools.

The first purpose-built swimming pool at Cranleigh School was a concrete-lined trough, constructed in the late 1880s next to the plunge pool in which pupils washed. A new bathing building was constructed in the early 1910s, housing an unheated swimming pool and about a dozen free-standing slipper baths. An outdoor swimming pool with adjacent changing rooms was built in 1959, and a 25 m-long (82 ft) indoor pool opened alongside it in 1991.

The first record of rugby being played at Cranleigh School is from 1896, but it did not become the main winter sport until the First World War.

=== Combined Cadet Force ===
Military-style drill exercises were introduced to the school by Headmaster George Allen. An inspection parade involving around 350 pupils is recorded in 1886, although the number taking part in drill had fallen to around 200 by 1895. In 1900, Allen obtained permission from the War Office to create an Officers' Training Corps (O.T.C.), which he formed at the school in May 1900. The cap badge, worn by Cranleigh cadets until 1959, included the insignia of the Queen's Royal Regiment (West Surrey) above the words "Cranleigh O. T. C." In 1901, Cranleigh pupils participated for the first time in the Public Schools' Field Day at Aldershot and in shooting competitions at Bisley Ranges.

In 1948, school O.T.C.s across the country became part of the newly established Combined Cadet Force (C.C.F.). Initially, membership of the Cranleigh C.C.F. was compulsory, but from June 1967, pupils were allowed to leave after attending a camp and passing a proficiency test. The school C.C.F. counts the creation of the O.T.C. as the date of its foundation and the force celebrated its 125th anniversary in 2025.

=== Music and drama ===
Musical activities have been offered at Cranleigh since the school opened, and pupils were able to pay extra for instrumental tuition from the outset. A concert is known to have taken place in the summer term of 1866, and the choir was able to sing at the consecration service for the new chapel in 1869. In the 1910s, several houses had a gramophone and senior prefects were sometimes allowed to fund the purchase of new records using money collected in fines. A dance band was formed in mid-1930s. The Merriman Music School, named for the first headmaster, was opened in July 2000 and contains a 100-seat auditorium. In 2025, pupils are able to join a wide range of musical ensembles, including jazz and rock bands, choirs and a symphony orchestra.

The opening of the Devonport Speech Hall in July 1929 provided the first dedicated auditorium for theatre performances at Cranleigh. Two years later, Michael Redgrave joined the school to teach modern languages and he was made responsible for producing student plays, directing four works by Shakespeare over the next three years. His final production, King Lear, reviewed in The Times, was in July 1934, after which he became a professional actor and later director. Redgrave's work at Cranleigh was continued by John Stanley Purvis, who taught at the school until 1938. A film society was formed in 1931, to show films to pupils at weekends. An inter-house drama competition takes place at the school every year.

== Notable alumni ==
Former pupils of the school may join the Old Cranleighan Society. About 6,500 past pupils are currently members. The Old Cranleighan Sports Club in Thames Ditton in Surrey is owned by the Society.

== Notable teachers ==
=== Headmasters ===
- Rev. Joseph Merriman (1865–1891)
- Rev. George Allen (1892–1908)
- Charles Tyler (1909–1911)
- Rev. Herbert Rhodes (1911–1931) previously Headmaster of Ardingly College (1904–1911)
- Rev. David Loveday (1931–1954) later bishop of Dorchester (1959–1972)
- Henry March (1954–1959) later acting Headmaster of Charterhouse School (1964)
- H. P. Jacob (acting Headmaster, 1959–1960) Old Cranleighan and rugby union player
- David Emms (1960–1970) previously a rugby union player, left to become Headmaster of Sherborne School (1970–1974) and Dulwich College (1975–1986)
- Mark Van Hasselt (1970–1984)
- Anthony Hart (1984–1997)
- Guy Waller (1997–2014) previously an England cricketer and Headmaster of Lord Wandsworth College
- Martin Reader (2014–2024)
- Samantha Price (2024–) previously Headmistress of Benenden School (2014–2024)

=== Other teachers ===
- Steve Batchelor (Great Britain hockey player and Olympic gold medallist)
- Neil Bennett (England rugby player)
- Rev. William Booth (clergyman)
- Luis Cernuda (poet)
- Andrew Corran (cricketer)
- Vivian Cox (film-producer and Old Cranleighan)
- Dan Fox (England and Great Britain hockey player)
- Peter Freitag (former British hockey international player and coach)
- Roger Knight (cricketer)
- Charles W. L. Parker (England cricketer and Gloucestershire cricketer)
- Michael Redgrave (actor)
- Hilary Davan Wetton (conductor)
- Mike Worsley (England rugby player)

== Connaught Gallery ==
Gallery used to display local and national artists together with sixth form students.

Exhibitions
Dates	Title	Artist(s)
7–16 July 1972	Opening Exhibition	Richard Lane
17 November - 1 December 1972	Solo Exhibition	Anthea Horn
March 1973	Solo Exhibition	Dilys Bryon
4–12 May 1973	Solo Exhibition	Francis Russell Flint
June 1973	Group Exhibition	Patients and nurses of Brookwood Hospital
July 1973	Paintings	Michael Woods
2–21 June 1974	Solo Exhibition	Elizabeth Stuart Lee
1 - 22 March 1975	Painting	Peter Willis
May - July 1977	Solo Exhibition	Enzo Plazzotta
13 May - 15 June 1978	Solo Exhibition	Holly Downing
1979	Solo Exhibition	Mary Farmer
1983	Five Plus One	Jenny Beacham, Bob Belderson, Vivien Calleja, Pat Harby, Anne Horrocks, Jennifer Milne

== Bibliography ==
- Chadwick, Justin (2017). Sword and Baton: Senior Australian Army Officers from Federation to 2001. Vol. 1: 1900 to 1939. Newport, Australia: Big Sky Publishing. ISBN 978-1-92-552030-9.
- Elliott, John; Pritchard, John (2002). Henry Woodyer: Gentleman Architect. University of Reading. ISBN 978-0-70-491331-8.
- Honey, John Raymond de Simons (1977). Tom Brown's Universe : The Development of the English Public School in the Nineteenth Century. New York: Quadrangle/The New York Times Book Co. ISBN 978-0-81-290689-9.
- Megahey, Alan J. (1983). A History of Cranleigh School. London: Collins. ISBN 978-0-00-217159-5.
- O'Brien, Charles; Nairn, Ian; Cherry, Bridget; Pevsner, Nikolaus (2022) [1962]. Surrey. The Buildings of England. London: Yale University Press. ISBN 978-0-30-023478-7.
- Storr, F., ed. (1899). Life and Remains of R. H. Quick (PDF). Cambridge: Cambridge University Press. OCLC 1114126163.
- Swift, Peter (2006). Maunsell Schools Class 4-4-0. Locomotives in Detail. Hersham: Ian Allan. ISBN 978-0-71-103178-4.
