= Headmasters' and Headmistresses' Conference =

Association of independent school head teachers

- Leading Independent Schools
- Abbreviation: HMC
- Formation: 1869; 157 years ago
- Type: Non-governmental organisation
- Purpose: Educational accreditation
- Headquarters: Market Harborough
- Location: Market Harborough, Leicestershire
- Region served: Commonwealth and Ireland
- Members: 351 full members (including international)
- General Secretary: Simon Hyde
- Affiliations: ISC
- Website: hmc.org.uk

The Headmasters' and Headmistresses' Conference (HMC), formerly known as the Headmasters' Conference and now branded HMC (The Heads' Conference), is an association of the head teachers of 351 private fee-charging schools (both boarding schools and day schools), traditionally described as public schools. 302 members are based in the United Kingdom, Crown dependencies and Ireland. There are 72 international members (mostly from the Commonwealth) and also 28 associate or affiliate members who are head teachers of state schools or other influential individuals in the world of education, who endorse and support the work of HMC.

== History ==
The Conference dates from 1869 when Edward Thring, Headmaster of Uppingham School, asked sixty of his fellow headmasters to meet at his house to consider the formation of a "School Society and Annual Conference". Fourteen accepted the invitation, and twelve were present for the whole of the initial meeting: Edward Thring, George Blore (Bromsgrove School), Albert Wratislaw (King Edward VI School, Bury St Edmunds), John Mitchinson (The King's School, Canterbury), William Grignon (Felsted School), Robert Sanderson (Lancing College), George Butler (Liverpool College), Augustus Jessopp (Norwich School), William Wood (Oakham School), Steuart Pears (Repton School), T. H. Stokoe (Richmond), Daniel Harper (Sherborne School), and James Welldon (Tonbridge School). John Dyne (Highgate School) attended on the second day, and Alfred Carver (Dulwich College) did not turn up. From that date there have been annual meetings.

Until the 1970s, membership was confined to 200 schools. In 1996, the association changed its name from the "Headmasters' Conference" to the "Headmasters' and Headmistresses' Conference". In 2023, the name was changed to HMC (The Heads' Conference).

Membership of the HMC is often considered to be what defines a school as a public school in England and Wales. Not all independent schools are in the HMC; in particular, many notable girls' schools are not members, partly because historically the HMC was for boys' schools only. In 2005, the association opened membership to heads of girls-only schools. Today HMC's membership includes boys', girls' and co-educational schools.

== List of HMC member schools in the United Kingdom and Crown dependencies ==
=== England ===
- The Abbey School, Reading
- Abingdon School
- Ackworth School
- ACS International School Cobham,
- AKS Lytham
- Aldenham School
- Alleyn's School
- Ampleforth College
- Ardingly College
- Ashford School
- Ashville College
- Bablake and King Henry VIII School
- Badminton School
- Bancroft's School
- Barnard Castle School
- Bedales School
- Bede's School
- Bedford School
- Bedford Modern School
- Benenden School
- Berkhamsted School
- Birkdale School
- Birkenhead School
- Bishop's Stortford College
- Bloxham School
- Blundell's School
- Bolton School
- Bootham School
- Box Hill School
- Bradfield College
- Bradford Grammar School
- Brentwood School
- Brighton College
- Bristol Grammar School
- Bromley High School
- Bromsgrove School
- Bryanston School
- The Bury Grammar Schools
- Canford School
- Caterham School
- Charterhouse
- Cheadle Hulme School
- Cheltenham College
- The Cheltenham Ladies' College
- Chetham's School of Music
- Chigwell School
- Christ's Hospital
- Churcher's College
- City of London Freemen's School
- City of London School
- City of London School for Girls
- Claremont Fan Court School
- Clayesmore School
- Clifton College
- Cokethorpe School
- Colfe's School
- Collegiate School
- Cranleigh School
- Culford School
- Dame Allan's Schools
- Dauntsey's School
- Dean Close School
- Denstone College
- Downe House School
- Downside School
- Dulwich College
- Durham School
- Eastbourne College
- Edgbaston High School
- Ellesmere College
- Eltham College
- Emanuel School
- Embley
- Epsom College
- Eton College
- Exeter School
- Felsted School
- Forest School
- Framlingham College
- Francis Holland, Regent's Park
- Francis Holland, Sloane Square
- Frensham Heights School
- Giggleswick School
- Godolphin School
- The Godolphin and Latymer School
- The Grammar School at Leeds
- The Grange School
- Gresham's School
- Guildford High School
- Haberdashers' Boys' School
- Haileybury
- Halliford School
- Hampton School
- Harrow School
- Hereford Cathedral School
- Highgate School
- Hill House School
- Hurstpierpoint College
- Hymers College
- Ibstock Place School
- Immanuel College
- Ipswich School
- James Allen's Girls' School
- The John Lyon School
- Kent College
- Kent College, Pembury
- Kimbolton School
- King Edward VI School, Southampton
- King Edward's School, Bath
- King Edward's School, Birmingham
- King Edward's School, Witley
- King's Bruton
- King's College, Taunton
- King's College School
- The King's School, Canterbury
- The King's School, Chester
- King's Ely
- The King's School, Gloucester
- The King's School, Macclesfield
- King's Rochester
- The King's School, Worcester
- Kingston Grammar School
- Kingswood School
- Kirkham Grammar School
- Lady Eleanor Holles School
- Lancing College
- Langley School
- Latymer Upper School
- Leicester Grammar School
- Leighton Park School
- The Leys School
- Lincoln Minster School
- Lingfield College
- Lord Wandsworth College
- Loughborough Grammar School
- Magdalen College School
- Malvern College
- The Manchester Grammar School
- Marlborough College
- Merchant Taylors' Boys' School, Crosby
- Merchant Taylors' School, Northwood
- Millfield
- The Mill Hill School Foundation
- Monkton Combe School
- Moreton Hall
- Mount Kelly
- New Hall School
- Newcastle High School for Girls
- Newcastle-under-Lyme School
- Newcastle upon Tyne Royal Grammar School
- Norwich School
- Norwich High School for Girls
- Nottingham High School
- Notting Hill & Ealing High School
- Oakham School
- Oldham Hulme Grammar School
- The Oratory School
- Oswestry School
- Oundle School
- Pangbourne College
- The Perse School
- Plymouth College
- Pocklington School
- Portsmouth Grammar School
- Princethorpe College
- Prior Park College
- Putteridge High School
- Putney High School
- Queen Anne's School
- Queen Elizabeth Grammar School, Wakefield
- Queen Elizabeth's Hospital
- Queen's College
- Queenswood
- Radley College
- Ratcliffe College
- Reading Blue Coat School
- Reed's School
- Redmaids' High School
- Reigate Grammar School
- Rendcomb College
- Repton School
- Rossall School
- Roedean School
- Royal Grammar School, Guildford
- RGS Worcester
- Royal High School, Bath
- The Royal Hospital School
- The Royal Masonic School for Girls
- Royal Russell School
- Rugby School
- Ryde School with Upper Chine
- St Albans School
- St Albans High School for Girls
- St Bede's College
- St Benedict's School
- St Columba's College, St Albans
- St Dunstan's College
- St Edmund's College
- St Edmund's School
- St Edward's School, Oxford
- St George's College, Weybridge
- St Helen and St Katharine
- St John's School, Leatherhead
- St Lawrence College
- St Mary's Calne
- St Mary's College
- St Mary's School Ascot
- St Paul's Girls' School
- St Paul's School
- St Peter's School
- St Swithun's School
- Scarborough College
- Seaford College
- Sedbergh School
- Sevenoaks School
- Sherborne School
- Sherborne Girls
- Shiplake College
- Shrewsbury School
- Sidcot School
- Sir William Perkins's School
- Solihull School
- South Hampstead High School
- Stamford Endowed Schools
- The Stephen Perse Foundation
- Stockport Grammar School
- Stonyhurst College
- Stowe School
- Streatham and Clapham High School
- Surbiton High School
- Sutton Valence School
- Taunton School
- Tonbridge School
- Tormead School
- Tranby School
- Trent College
- Trinity School
- Truro School
- University College School
- Uppingham School
- Warminster School
- Warwick Schools Foundation
- Wellingborough School
- Wellington College
- Wellington School
- Wells Cathedral School
- West Buckland School
- Westminster School
- Whitgift School
- Winchester College
- Wimbledon High School
- Wisbech Grammar School
- Withington Girls' School
- Woldingham School
- Wolverhampton Grammar School
- Woodbridge School
- Woodhouse Grove School
- Worksop College
- Worth School
- Wrekin College
- Wycliffe College
- Wycombe Abbey
- Yarm School

=== Scotland ===
- Albyn School
- Dollar Academy
- The Edinburgh Academy
- Erskine Stewart's Melville Schools
- Fettes College
- George Heriot's School
- George Watson's College
- The Glasgow Academy
- Glenalmond College
- Gordonstoun School
- High School of Dundee
- The High School of Glasgow
- Hutchesons' Grammar School
- Kelvinside Academy
- Lomond School
- Loretto School
- Merchiston Castle School
- Morrison's Academy
- Robert Gordon's College
- St Aloysius' College
- St Columba's School, Kilmacolm
- St Leonards School
- Strathallan School

=== Wales ===
- The Cathedral School, Llandaff
- Christ College
- Howell's School, Llandaff
- Haberdashers' Monmouth School
- Rougemont School

=== Northern Ireland ===
- Belfast Royal Academy
- Campbell College
- Coleraine Grammar School (formerly Coleraine Academical Institution)
- Friends' School, Lisburn
- Methodist College, Belfast
- Rockport School
- Sullivan Upper School
- The Royal Belfast Academical Institution
- The Royal School, Armagh
- The Royal School Dungannon

=== Guernsey ===
- Elizabeth College

=== Jersey ===
- Victoria College

=== Isle of Man ===
- King William's College

== International members ==
=== Africa ===
- Michaelhouse, KwaZulu-Natal, South Africa
- Peponi School, Ruiru, Kenya
- Peterhouse Boys' School, Marondera, Zimbabwe
- St. Andrews School, Turi, Kenya
- St. George's College, Harare, Zimbabwe

=== Asia ===
- American International School, Saigon, Vietnam
- Bangkok International Preparatory and Secondary School, Thailand
- The British School, New Delhi, India
- British School Jakarta, Indonesia
- The Doon School, Dehradun, India
- Dulwich College Shanghai Pudong, China
- Dulwich College Singapore
- Harrow International School Bangkok, Thailand
- Harrow International School Hong Kong
- Harrow International School Shenzhen, China
- Jerudong International School, Bandar Seri Begawan, Brunei Darussalam
- Kellett School, Hong Kong
- King's College International School, Bangkok, Thailand
- Kolej Tuanku Ja'afar, Negeri Sembilan, Malaysia
- The Lawrence School, Sanawar, India
- Marlborough College Malaysia
- Shrewsbury International School Bangkok, Thailand
- Tanglin Trust School, Singapore
- Wellington College International Shanghai, China

=== Australia and New Zealand ===
- King's College, Auckland
- Christ's College, Christchurch, Canterbury, Christchurch
- The King's School, Sydney, New South Wales
- Pymble Ladies' College, Sydney, New South Wales
- The Scots College, Sydney, New South Wales
- St Leonard's College, Melbourne, Victoria
- Sydney Grammar School, New South Wales

=== Central, North and South America ===
- Crofton House School, Vancouver, Canada
- The Grange School, Santiago, Chile
- Markham College, Lima, Peru
- San Silvestre School, Lima, Peru
- St George's College, Buenos Aires, Argentina
- St. Michaels University School, Victoria, Canada
- St Paul's School, Brazil São Paulo, Brazil

=== Continental Europe ===
- Aiglon College, Chesières, Switzerland
- Akademeia High School, Warsaw, Poland
- The British School in the Netherlands, The Hague, The Netherlands
- The British School of Amsterdam, The Netherlands
- The British School of Barcelona, Spain
- The British School of Brussels, Belgium
- The British School of Bucharest, Romania
- The British School of Milan, Italy
- The British School of Paris, France
- The Cambridge School of Bucharest, Romania
- Campion School, Athens, Greece
- The English College in Prague, Czech Republic
- The English School, Nicosia, Cyprus
- The International School of Lausanne, Switzerland
- King's College, Madrid, Spain
- Oporto British School, Porto, Portugal
- St Catherine’s British School, Athens, Greece
- St George's, Rome, Italy
- St Julian's School, Lisbon, Portugal

=== Middle East ===
- Brighton College Abu Dhabi, United Arab Emirates — Barney Durrant
- Brighton College Dubai, United Arab Emirates — Simon Crane
- British International School of Jeddah, Saudi Arabia — Helen Olds
- British International School Riyadh, Saudi Arabia — Jeremy Newton
- The British School Al Khubairat, Abu Dhabi, United Arab Emirates — Mark Leppard
- British School Muscat, Oman — Kai Vacher
- Deira International School, Dubai, United Arab Emirates — Simon O'Connor
- Doha College, Qatar — David Tongue
- Dubai College, United Arab Emirates — Tom Duckling
- GEMS FirstPoint, Dubai, United Arab Emirates — David Wade
- GEMS Jumeirah College, Dubai, United Arab Emirates — Nick Brain
- GEMS Wellington Academy Al Khail, Dubai, United Arab Emirates — Ann Haydon
- GEMS Wellington International School, Dubai, United Arab Emirates — Maryssa O’Connor
- GEMS Wesgreen International School, Sharjah, United Arab Emirates — James McDonald
- Jumeirah English Speaking School, Dubai, United Arab Emirates — Shane O'Brien
- St Christopher's School, Isa Town, Bahrain — Simon Watson

== Associates ==
- Bangor Grammar School, Bangor, County Down
- Bishop Wordsworth's School, Salisbury, Wiltshire
- Gordon's School, Woking, Surrey
- Pate's Grammar School, Cheltenham, Gloucestershire
- The Judd School, Tonbridge, Kent
- Wymondham College, Morley, Norfolk

== Former Members ==
- Abbotsholme School
- Allhallows School (closed 1998)
- Bath College (closed 1909)
- Beaumont College (closed 1967)
- Bristol Cathedral School
- Carmel College (closed 1997)
- Doncaster Grammar School
- Douai School (closed 1999)
- Dover College
- Kelly College (closed 2014)
- King Edward VI School, Bury St Edmunds
- Liverpool College
- Llandovery College
- Mercers' School (closed 1959)
- Mount St Mary's College (closed 2025)
- Queen Elizabeth's Grammar School, Blackburn
- Rendcomb College (closed 2026)
- Richmond School
- Rishworth School
- Rydal School
- St Bees School
- St Lawrence College, Ramsgate
- Sebright School
- Tettenhall College
- Weymouth College (closed 1940)
- William Hulme's Grammar School

== HMC Projects in Central and Eastern Europe ==
HMC Projects in Central and Eastern Europe is a charity offering opportunities for students and young teachers from Central and Eastern Europe to develop themselves, by coming to HMC member schools in the UK for a year.

== Chairs of the HMC ==
=== Chairmen of the Headmasters' Conference ===
The following were the Chairmen of the HMC until 1996.

- Edward Thring, Headmaster, Uppingham School, 1869
- Daniel Harper, Head-master, Sherborne School, 1870
- John Dyne, Head Master, Highgate School, 1871
- A R Vardy, Chief Master, King Edward's School, Birmingham, 1872
- G Ridding, Head Master, Winchester College, 1873
- Alfred Carver, Master, Dulwich College, 1874
- John Percival, Headmaster, Clifton College, 1875
- T W Jex-Blake, Head Master, Rugby School, 1876
- G C Bell, Master, Marlborough College, 1877
- H M Butler, Head Master, Harrow School, 1878
- J J Hornby, Head Master, Eton College, 1879–80
- E C Wickham, Head Master, Wellington College, 1881
- H W Eve, Head Master, University College School, 1882–83
- E M Young, Head Master, Sherborne School, 1884–85
- W Haig Brown, Head Master, Charterhouse, 1886–87
- W A Fearon, Head Master, Winchester College, 1888–89
- E Warre, Head Master, Eton College, 1890–91
- L W Baker, Headmaster, Merchant Taylors' School, 1892–93
- E Warre, Head Master, Eton College, 1894–95
- H A James, Headmaster, Rugby School, 1896
- E Lyttelton, Headmaster, Haileybury, 1897
- H W Moss, Headmaster, Shrewsbury School, 1898–99
- Dr H B Gray, Head Master, Bradfield College, 1900
- H W Moss, Headmaster, Shrewsbury School, 1901
- C C Tancock, Headmaster, Tonbridge School, 1902
- E Lyttelton, Headmaster, Haileybury, 1903
- A W Upcott, Head Master, Christ's Hospital, 1904
- G Rendell, Head Master, Charterhouse, 1905
- S R James, Headmaster, Malvern College, 1906
- C E Brownrigg, Master, Magdalen College School, 1907
- R Arbuthnot Nairn, Head Master, Merchant Taylors' School, 1908
- W T A Barber, Headmaster, The Leys School, 1909
- E Lyttelton, Head Master, Eton College, 1910
- N C Smith, Head-master, Sherborne School, 1911
- J Gow, Head Master, Westminster School, 1912
- W C Eppstein, Headmaster, Reading Blue Coat School, 1913
- F Fletcher, Head Master, Charterhouse, 1914–15
- A A David, Headmaster, Rugby School, 1916–18
- F Fletcher, Head Master, Charterhouse, 1919
- A A David, Headmaster, Rugby School, 1920–21
- R Cary Gilson, Chief Master, King Edward's School, Birmingham, 1922
- F Fletcher, Head Master, Charterhouse, 1923
- Cyril Alington, Head Master, Eton College, 1924–25
- F Fletcher, Headmaster, Charterhouse, 1926–27
- R Cary Gilson, Chief Master, King Edward's School, Birmingham, 1928
- F. Fletcher, Headmaster, Charterhouse, 1929
- F B Malim, Master, Wellington College, 1930
- F Fletcher, Headmaster, Charterhouse, 1931
- F B Malim, Master, Wellington College, 1932
- D C Norwood, Head Master, Harrow School, 1933
- F Fletcher, Headmaster, Charterhouse, 1934
- F B Malim, Master, Wellington College, 1935
- H H Hardy, Headmaster, Shrewsbury School, 1936–38
- Spencer Leeson, Head Master, Winchester College, 1939–44
- J Wolfenden, Headmaster, Shrewsbury School, 1945
- J Wolfenden, Headmaster, Shrewsbury School, 1946
- H Lyon, Headmaster, Rugby School, 1947
- J Wolfenden, Headmaster, Shrewsbury School, 1948
- J Wolfenden, Headmaster, Shrewsbury School, 1949
- G C Turner, Headmaster, Charterhouse, 1950
- R Birley, Head Master, Eton College, 1951–52
- E James, High Master, The Manchester Grammar School, 1953–54
- Walter Hamilton, Headmaster, Westminster School, 1955–56
- R Birley, Head Master, Eton College, 1957–58
- Desmond Lee, Head Master, Winchester College, 1959–60
- C P C Smith, Headmaster, Haileybury, 1961–62
- D R Wigram, Headmaster, Monkton Combe School, 1963–64 and 1964–65
- Walter Hamilton, Headmaster, Rugby School, 1965–66
- Desmond Lee, Head Master, Winchester College, 1967
- D D Lindsay, Headmaster, Malvern College, 1968
- T E B Howarth, High Master, St Paul's School, 1969
- J MacKay, Headmaster, Bristol Grammar School, 1970
- A R D Wright, Headmaster, Shrewsbury School, 1971
- F H Shaw, Headmaster, King's College School, Wimbledon, 1972
- F F Fisher, Master, Wellington College, 1973
- Michael McCrum, Head Master, Eton College, 1974
- N P Barry, Headmaster, Ampleforth College, 1975
- R W Young, Principal, George Watson's College, 1976
- J M Rae, Headmaster, Westminster School, 1977
- David Baggley, Headmaster, Bolton School, 1978
- J S Woodhouse, Headmaster, Rugby School, 1979
- Ian Beer, Headmaster, Lancing College, 1980
- John Thorn, Head Master, Winchester College, 1981
- J W Hele, High Master, St Paul's School, 1982
- Roger Ellis, Master, Marlborough College, 1983
- David Emms, Master, Dulwich College, 1984
- B H McGowan, Headmaster, Haberdashers' Aske's Boys' School, 1985
- C H D Everett, Headmaster, Tonbridge School, 1986
- M J W Rogers, Headmaster, King Edward's School, Birmingham, 1987
- D A G Smith, Headmaster, Bradford Grammar School, 1988
- M M Marriott, Headmaster, Canford School, 1989
- D. J. Jewel], Master, Haileybury, 1990
- J. G. Parker, High Master, The Manchester Grammar School, 1991
- D. L. Milroy, Headmaster, Ampleforth College, 1992
- R. J. Wilson, Headmaster, Trinity School, 1993
- R. de C Chapman, Headmaster, Malvern College, 1994
- Hugh Wright, Chief Master, King Edward's School, Birmingham, 1995
- Anthony Evans, Headmaster, Portsmouth Grammar School, 1996

=== Chairs of the Headmasters' and Headmistresses' Conference ===
The following are the Chairs of the HMC after 1996.

- Michael Mavor, Headmaster, Rugby School, 1997
- Patrick Tobin, Principal, Stewart's Melville College, 1998
- James Sabben-Clare, Headmaster, Winchester College, 1999
- Tom Wheare, Headmaster, Bryanston School, 2000
- Chris Brown, Headmaster, Norwich School, 2001
- E. Gould, Master, Marlborough College, 2002
- G. Able, Master, Dulwich College, 2003
- Martin Stephen, High Master, The Manchester Grammar School/St Paul's School, 2004
- Priscilla Chadwick, Principal, Berkhamsted Collegiate School, 2005
- Andrew Boggis, Warden, Forest School, 2006
- Nigel Richardson, Headmaster, The Perse School, 2007 <*>
- Bernard Trafford, Headmaster, Wolverhampton Grammar School, 2007–2008
- Tim Hastie-Smith, Headmaster, Dean Close School, 2008–2009
- Andrew Grant, Headmaster, St Albans School, 2009–2010
- David Levin, Headmaster, City of London School, 2010–2011
- Kenneth Durham, Headmaster, University College School, 2011–2012
- Chris Ray, High Master, Manchester Grammar School, 2012–2013
- Tim Hands, Master, Magdalen College School, 2013–2014
- Richard Harman, Headmaster, Uppingham School, 2014–2015
- Christopher King, Headmaster, Leicester Grammar School, 2015–2016
- Mike Buchanan, Headmaster, Ashford School, 2016–2017
- Christopher King, Headmaster, Leicester Grammar School, 2017–2018
- Shaun Fenton, Headmaster, Reigate Grammar School, 2018–2019
- Fiona Boulton, Headmistress, Guildford High School, 2019–2020
- Sally-Anne Huang, High Master, St Paul's School, 2020–2021
- Richard Backhouse, Principal, Berkhamsted School, 2021–2022
- Melvyn Roffe, Principal, George Watson's College, 2022–2023
- Sue Woodroofe, Principal, The Grammar School at Leeds, 2023–2024

<*> Change to Academic Year Chairmanship

=== Chairs of the HMC Committee ===
The following were Chairmen of the HMC Committee in the early years of the Conference. In these years they served alongside the Chairman of the Conference (the 'annual meeting') until, in 1921, it was agreed that the Chairman of the Annual Meeting should always also be Chairman of the HMC Committee.

- G Ridding, Head Master, Winchester College, 1870, 1871, 1872
- Daniel Harper, Head Master, Sherborne School, 1874, 1875, 1876, 1877, 1878
- G C Bell, Master, Marlborough College, 1879, 1881, 1882, 1883, 1885, 1886, 1887
- T W Jex-Blake, Head Master, Rugby School, 1880
- E C Wickham, Head Master, Wellington College, 1884, 1888
- E Warre, Head Master, Eton College, 1889, 1893
- W A Fearon, Head Master, Winchester College, 1891, 1895
- E Lyttelton, Headmaster, Haileybury, 1898, 1902, 1904
- H W Moss, Headmaster, Shrewsbury School, 1900
- J Gow, Head Master, Westminster School, 1906, 1907, 1908, 1911
- R Cary Gilson, Chief Master, King Edward's School, Birmingham, 1909, 1910
- F Fletcher, Head Master, Charterhouse, 1913
- C Lowry, Headmaster, Tonbridge School, 1916

== See also ==
- Girls' Schools Association
- Headmasters' Conference of the Independent Schools of Australia
- List of private schools in the United Kingdom
- Society of Heads
