= Tobi Ibitoye =

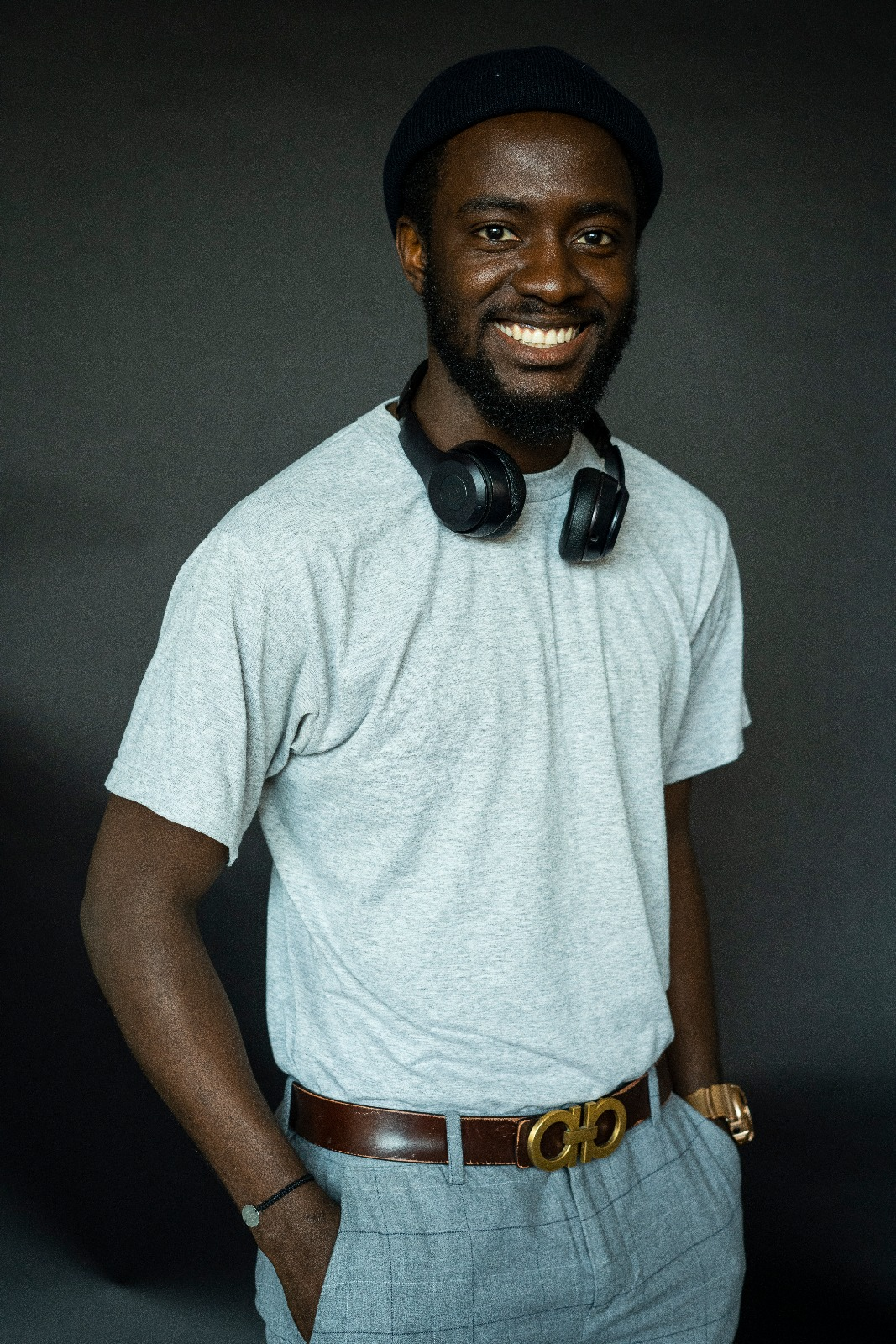
- Tobi Ibitoye

Background information
- Born: Oluwatobi Ayokunle Ibitoye; 9 August 1993 (age 32); Nigeria
- Genres: Pop; Indie Rock; Electronic Music
- Occupations: Singer; songwriter
- Instruments: Vocals; Violin
- Years active: 2015–present
- Labels: Uninvited Artists

Oluwatobi Ayokunle Ibitoye (born 9 August 1993), better known as Tobi Ibitoye, is a Nigerian-born Romanian singer and songwriter from Bucharest. He was a finalist on 5th edition of The Voice of Romania and is now signed to an independent record label in Romania, Uninvited Artists. He is also the first and only Black man to have been listed on Forbes Romania top 30 under 30 list in the year 2016. He moved to Romania at the age of fifteen in 2009 and delved into music right after his appearance on the TV show. His influences include genres such as pop, indie rock and electronic music.

== Childhood and education ==
Tobi Ibitoye was born on 9 August 1993 in Zone 2 of the Wuse District in Abuja. He had his primary and secondary education in Nigeria's capital and at the age of 15, he moved to Bucharest, Romania with his parents, due to his father's engagement to the Nigerian embassy in Romania. Tobi continued his studies at the International School of Bucharest and went on finish his high school education at the Cambridge School of Bucharest. He went on to study Biochemistry at the Faculty of Biology of the University of Bucharest.

He first encountered music at church during regular Sunday service. At the age of ten, he started experimenting with his mother's violin and has since maintained an affinity for this instrument.

== Music career ==
=== The Voice of Romania ===
In August 2015, Tobi appeared on the Voice of Romania performing James Brown's "It's a Man's Man's Man's World". He continued in the competition with Andrei Tiberiu Maria as his mentor and made it to the finals of the competition, where he finished as the second runner up. The impact of his performances on the show was applauded by the Romanian media, especially Forbes Romania, who listed him as one of the most influential people living in Romania under the age of 30 in their annual Top 30 under 30 list for the year 2016, making him the first and only black man to have been on such a list.

=== Releases ===
The Finals of the Voice of Romania served as a premier for Tobi Ibitoye, who launched his music career and his first single: "Miss You" produced by Hahaha Production, and signed by the Media Pro Music a subsidiary of Universal Music Group, on the night of the finals.

A few months after the contest, he had to return for a short period of time to his native country, after which he returned to Bucharest and started working on new records with the producers from HaHaHa Production. In the summer of 2018, he signed a record deal with one of the newest Independent Record Labels in Romania, Uninvited Artist, through which his second single Loving me was released.

His second single was remixed by Alin Dumitriu and this remix premiered on Dance FM Bucharest's weekly top 20, on which it was listed for six weeks. It was also listed on Dance FM Bucharest's top 50 records for the year 2018. Loving me also joined the list of Romanian produced records made available on the streaming platform of America's leading Radio Station, iHeartRadio

Tobi's story also attracted the attention of foreign media such as BBC, whose report focused on the challenges of his early days in Bucharest.

"Faith", in collaboration with Gabriel M, set new records for the artist, after entering Dance FM Bucharest's weekly Top 20 where it remained for nine weeks; it is also being broadcast on UTV Romania.

== Discography ==
=== Singles ===
- Miss You (2015)
- Loving me and Remix (2018)
- Come home (2018)
- Real – Deja Who (2018)
- Love and A Song (2020)

=== Collaborations ===
- Beating heart – Andre Rizo (2018)
- Real – Deja Who (2018)
- Faith – Gabriel M (2019)
- J'ai besoin de toi – Mark Azekko ft. Eneli
- Mystery – Aspra
- Sun – Sasha Lopez & Diotic
- Nowhere – Eneli
- Dirty Diamonds – Vanotek
- OK - Deejay Fly
- LUV - RIME
- Way Up - Amari
