= Pro FM =

- Bucharest, Chişinău; Romania
- Broadcast area: Romania, Moldova

Programming
- Format: AC, Top 40

Ownership
- Owner: RCS & RDS
- Sister stations: Digi 24 FM, Dance FM, Digi FM

Links
- Website: www.profm.ro

Pro FM is a radio station in Romania and Moldova, it broadcasts in Romanian. It was sold by Central European Media Enterprises to RCS & RDS in 2014.

== Affiliated stations ==
- Hațeg – Radio T5 93.9 MHz
- Piatra Neamt – Radio Unu 92.0 MHz
- Galati – Radio Lider Fm 92.4 MHz
- Tulcea – Radio Delta 95.8 MHz
- Turda – Radio Turda 107.7 MHz
- Vaslui – Smile Fm 93,1 MHz
