= Cricket for a Cause =

Emirati charitable cricket league

Cricket for a Cause

Cricket for a Cause is a charitable cricket league in Dubai that has been taking place during Ramadan for the past two years. The league was founded by Ashar Yahya, a high school student at Dubai College. The league has a partnership with Cover Drive, an indoor sports facility in Dubai, the venue for the league.

The league is endorsed and supported by Dubai Cares and the IAC.

== 2015 ==
The inaugural edition of the event took place between the 21st of June 2015 and the 1st of July 2015. 8 teams participated in the event. The format was 6 overs/6 players per side. The teams were placed in 2 groups of 4, and the top 2 teams for each group qualified for the semi-finals. The league was eventually won by Emax.

The league started off successfully, raising 13,300AED for Dubai Cares, the largest charity in Dubai.

== Expansion ==
After the inaugural event was a success, Yahya built a team of 3 to try and increase the money raised for charity in 2016. With the help of Suraj Chablani, Jonathan Lattouf and Jordan Russell, Yahya was able to make the 2016 event even more successful by increasing the number of sponsors, participants, and money generated for charity.

== 2016 ==
The following year, Yahya wanted to make the event even bigger and had a target of 30,000AED to be raised for Dubai Cares.

16 teams participated in the 2016 edition, double from the previous year. Teams were placed in 4 groups, with the top side from each group qualifying for the semi-finals. The league was eventually won by Ladybird Nursery. By the end of the tournament, Yahya was able to over 40,000AED for Dubai Cares. For his efforts and achievements, Ashar was awarded the "Everyday Heroes" award by Youth Service America

Final Standings
1	Ladybird 1
2	Ladybird 3
3	LFC 1

== 2017 ==
The league and its organizers have announced plans to organize another tournament in Ramadan 2017, with the aim of raising 100,000AED for charity. Yahya announced plans to increase the organization team to around 10 people.

In April 2017, Yahya was inducted in Youth Service America's Global Youth Council for his efforts in helping children in developing countries gain access to a quality level of education.

== Sponsors ==
2015- Pringles, Pepsi, Emax, Madcom, Du

2016- Pringles, Pepsi, Du, Red Bull, Careem, Ladybird Nursery, UniGulf, Danube, Bayt.com, Hale, The Entertainer and UM MENA.
