= Graham George Able =

English educationalist

Graham George Able (born 28 July 1947) is an English educationalist who was the Master at Dulwich College from 1997 until his retirement in 2009.

== Early life ==
He was educated at Worksop College and went on to study Natural Sciences at Trinity College, Cambridge, where he received his MA in 1968. In 1969 he completed his PGCE and married Mary Susan Munro with whom he has a son, and a daughter.

== Career ==
After completing his PGCE in 1969 Graham Able went on to teach at Sutton Valence School. In 1976 he became the Boarding Housemaster and he continued in this role until his departure in 1983. In 1983 he also completed an MA in Social Sciences from Durham University. In that year he took up the position of Second Master at Barnard Castle School and in 1988 he left Barnard Castle School and went on to become the Headmaster of Hampton School. During his time at Hampton School he jointly published ‘'Head to Head'’ in 1992, became a Fellow of the Royal Society of Arts in 1994, and MIoD in 1995. In 1996 he left Hampton School and took up the position of Master of Dulwich College in 1997. He retired in the Summer of 2009 and was made a Fellow of Dulwich College.

Able was Chief Executive Officer of the Alpha Plus Group, a company that owns a number of schools and colleges in Britain, from 2009 to 2014, and has been its Deputy Chairman since 2014.

During his time at Dulwich College Graham Able was co-chairman of the HMC and GSA Education and Academic Policy Committee (from 1998 to 2001). In 2003 he was chairman of the HMC. In 1998 he jouned the Edexcel Foundation Council. He served on the Council and Court of ICSTM, from 1999 to 2006, on the Council of Roedean School, 2000 to 2009, and the governing body of Gresham's School from 2013 to 2020.

His love of cricket is epitomised by his membership of the MCC and he is also an honorary member of the East India Club.

== Publications ==
- Head to Head (jointly) - 1992
- Head to HoD (jointly) - 1998

Academic offices
Preceded by Anthony Verity; Christopher Field, the Deputy Master was Acting Master during 1996	Master of Dulwich College; 1997–2009	Succeeded by Dr. Joseph Spence
