= Tyrese Johnson-Fisher =

English rugby union wing (born 1999)

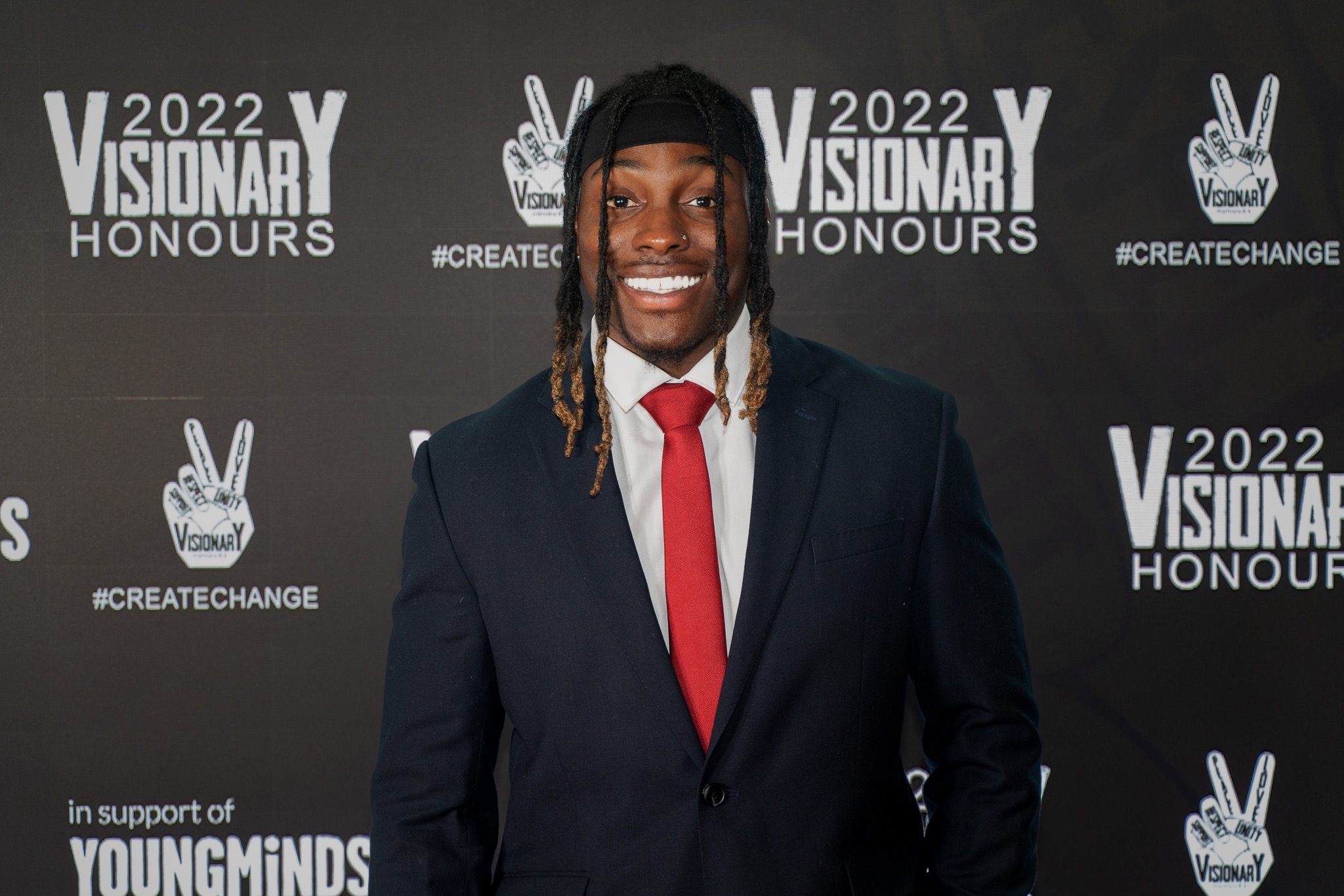
- Johnson-Fisher at the Visionary Honours in 2022

Profile
- Title: Running back

Personal information
- Born: 9 September 1999 (age 27); London, England
- Listed height: 5 ft 10 in (1.78 m)
- Listed weight: 230 lb (104 kg)

Career information
- Position: Professional Wrestler
- High school: Oakham School GEMS Wellington International School
- College: Coastal Carolina University Copiah-Lincoln Community College

Career history
- Istanbul Rams (2022)

Other information

Rugby union career
- Position: Wing
- Current team: Bristol Bears
Youth career
- 2013–2018: Leicester Tigers
Senior career
Years	Team	Apps	(Points)
2019–2020	Bristol Bears	1	(0)
- Correct as of 13 August 2019
National sevens team
Years	Team		Comps
2018	Jamaica 7s		1

Tyrese Darnell Johnson-Fisher (born 9 September 1999) is a British professional wrestler, known by his ring name Tyvolt.

Johnson-Fisher is a former American football running back who last played for the Prague Lions and Istanbul Rams of the European League of Football (ELF). He is a former professional rugby union wing for Bristol Bears in Premiership Rugby and represented Jamaica in Rugby sevens.

At the age of 15 a video of him playing for Oakham School emerged, with over 30 million views to date. He spent one year with the Coastal Carolina Chanticleers football team in the NCAA's Sun Belt Conference and attended Copiah–Lincoln Community College in the National Junior College Athletic Association.

== Career ==
Johnson-Fisher first came to prominence in March 2015 as a fifteen-year old at Oakham School, highlights of him scoring four tries in the Vase semi-final of the NatWest Schools Cup were watched by more than a million people within a month, eventually reaching 2.5 million views. He also represented Leicester Tigers academy teams at under-17s and under 18s, and was also an accomplished sprinter, running the 100m in 10.72 seconds.

In December 2017 it was announced Johnson-Fisher had become the first non-American to receive an invitation to the All-American Game for high-school prospects in American football, despite never having played the game before. After receiving interest from Texas A&M, Penn State, Princeton, Massachusetts and Central Arkansas, Johnson-Fisher announced he had taken an offer of a football scholarship from Coastal Carolina University.

In April 2018, prior to taking up his football scholarship, Johnson-Fisher represented the Jamaica national rugby sevens team in the 2018 Hong Kong Sevens as part of the World Series Qualifier.

Johnson-Fisher did not pad up for Coastal Carolina red shirting the 2018 season, he entered the NCAA transfer portal in February 2019, but in August 2019 he instead chose to return to rugby and sign a professional contract with Bristol Bears in England's Premiership Rugby, the top division of English rugby union. This proved to be short-lived, however, as he left the club in February 2020 to pursue interests outside professional rugby. His sole appearance for the club came as a substitute in a 42–19 loss to Exeter Chiefs in the Premiership Rugby Cup on 12 October 2019.

In 2022, Johnson-Fisher played for the Istanbul Rams of the European League of Football (ELF). He then joined the Berlin Rebels of the German Football League in 2023, before returning to the European League of Football in 2024 with the Prague Lions. Later that year, he had a workout with the Jacksonville Jaguars of the National Football League (NFL). He also participated in professional evaluation opportunities with the Edmonton Elks, New York Giants and New York Jets in 2024.

In 2025, Johnson-Fisher attended a WWE tryout in London as part of the company's international recruitment programme, as he began pursuing a career in professional wrestling.
