= Peter Pilkington, Baron Pilkington of Oxenford =

British public school headmaster (1933–2011)

The Right Honourable The Lord Pilkington of Oxenford
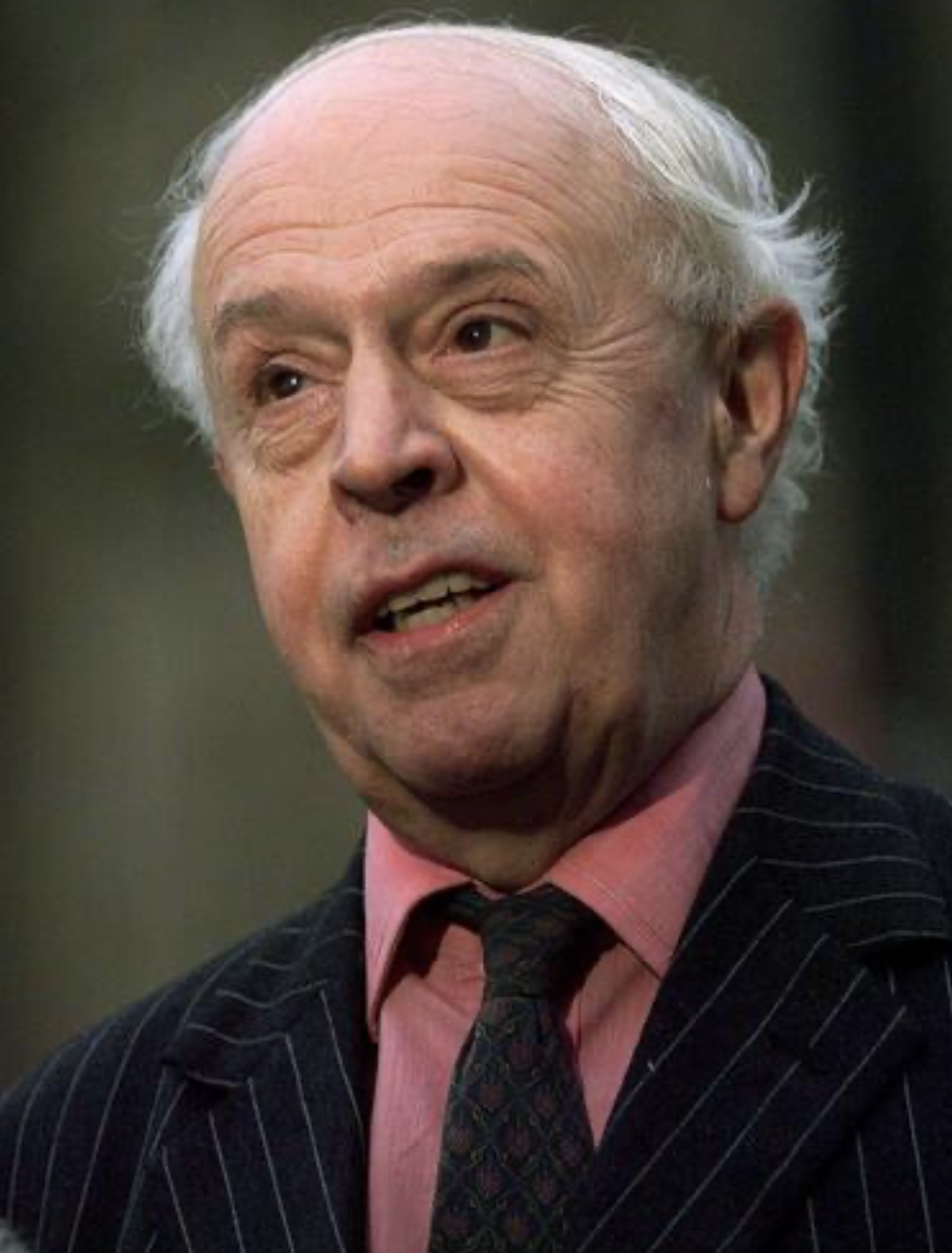
- Pilkington in 2010

Member of the House of Lords
- Lord Temporal
- Life peerage 12 January 1996 – 14 February 2011

Personal details
- Born: 5 September 1933
- Died: 14 February 2011 (aged 77)

Peter Pilkington, Baron Pilkington of Oxenford (5 September 1933 – 14 February 2011) was a British Anglican priest, public school headmaster and Conservative member of the House of Lords.

== Education ==
Pilkington was educated at Dame Allan's School, Newcastle, where he became religious and developed both his love of scholarship and his combative personality. In 1952, he went up to Jesus College, Cambridge, and read history, being influenced by Conservative-minded figures such as Maurice Cowling, Herbert Butterfield and Michael Oakeshott. He graduated in 1955, and took his MA degree in 1959.

== Ecclesiastical career ==
Pilkington trained for ordination at Westcott House, Cambridge, and was ordained as a deacon in the Diocese of Derby in 1959, and as a priest the following year. He served for three years as curate at the historic parish church of All Saints', Bakewell during the incumbency of George Sinker.

He left parochial work to take up his first school chaplaincy position. In 1975, he was appointed an honorary canon of Canterbury Cathedral.

== Educational career ==
In 1962, Pilkington became a schoolmaster at Eton College, teaching history, and a college chaplain. Later he became Conduct (senior chaplain), and for 10 years also served as Master in College, the housemaster of the scholars' house, until his resignation in 1975.

He was Headmaster of The King's School, Canterbury from 1975 to 1986.

His final appointment in education was the post of High Master of St Paul's School, London, from 1986 to 1992.

== Retirement ==
Following his retirement from education, Pilkington was appointed Chairman of the Broadcasting Complaints Commission, serving from 1992 to 1996.

In 1995, he was made a life peer as Baron Pilkington of Oxenford, of West Dowlish in the County of Somerset.

He also assisted in retirement as an honorary curate of St Mary's, Bourne Street, a prominent Anglo-Catholic church in Pimlico, serving from 1992 to 2005.

Although his entire teaching career was spent in the private sector, Pilkington was a vociferous supporter of selective state education. During his retirement, he served for several years as Chairman of the National Grammar Schools Association.

== Personal life ==
In 1966, Pilkington married Helen Wilson, who died in 1997. He was survived by two daughters, Celia and Sarah.

Preceded by James Warwick Hele	High Master of St Paul's School; 1986–1992	Succeeded by Richard Stephen Baldock
