= Master in College =

Master in College is the title of the housemaster of College, which is the oldest boarding house at Eton College and reserved for Eton's seventy King's Scholars.

King's Scholars (Collegers) attend Eton on scholarships provided under the original foundation by King Henry VI in 1440 and awarded by examination each year. The school originally consisted of 70 scholars (half of the first intake had previously been educated at Winchester College) together with a small number of Commensals.

The boarding house in which Collegers live is in the central area of the school off School Yard, where both Eton College Chapel and Lupton's Tower are situated. It includes New Buildings and Chamber. Chamber, the older section, includes rooms which look out onto School Yard, while New Buildings is on the reverse side and contains the majority of the boys' living spaces.

The position of Master in College dates from 1846 when the New Buildings were finished, Long Chamber was divided up, and other long-overdue reforms took place. Prior to that the Head Master had been directly responsible for the Scholars. "Mr C J Abraham [gave] up his overflowing boarding-house to take up the novel position of 'Assistant-Master in College' [sic]."

== List of Masters in College ==
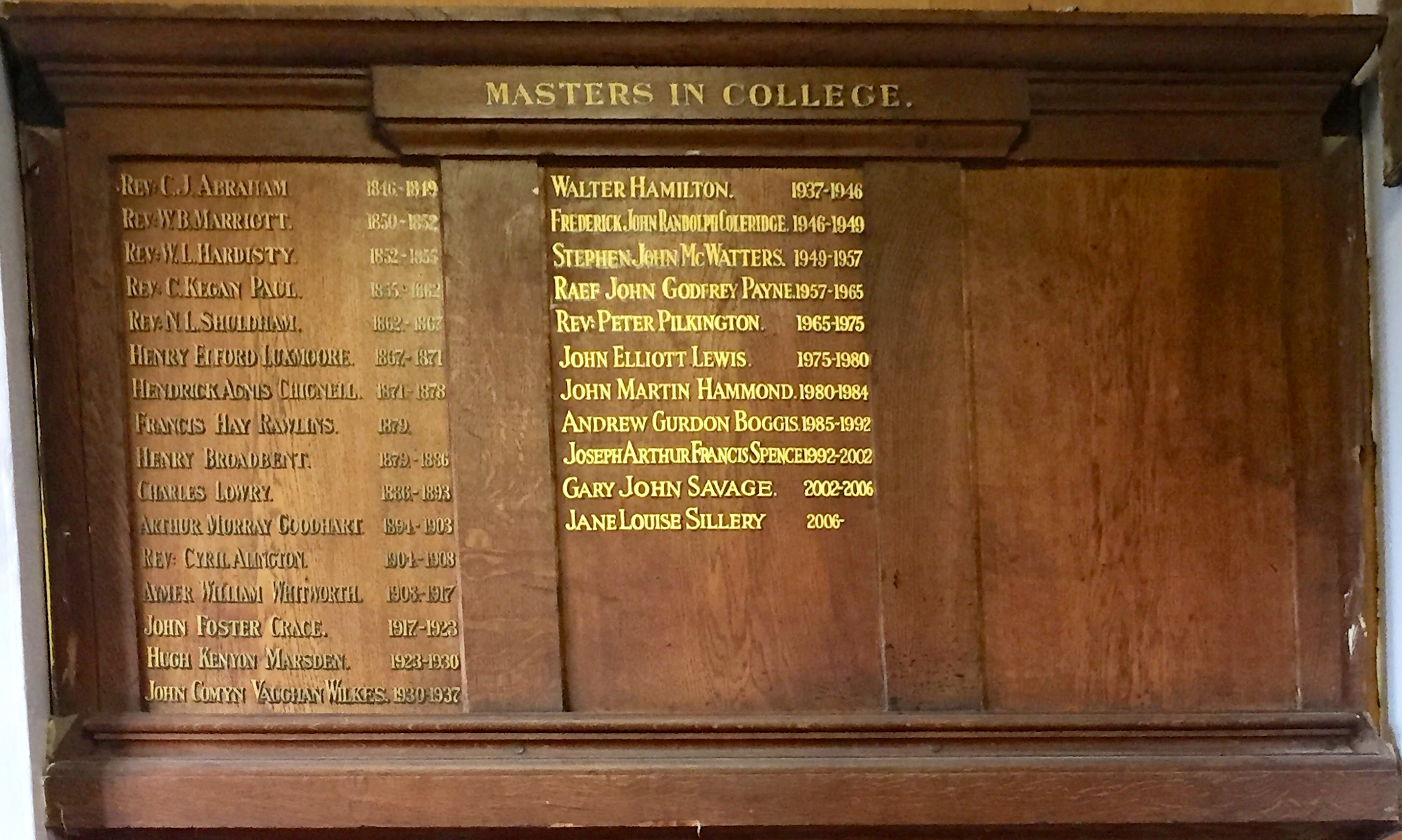
Display board at Eton listing the current and previous Masters in College as of 2015

- C. J. Abraham (1846–1849)
- W. B. Marriott (1850–1852)
- W. L. Hardisty (1852–1855)
- Charles Kegan Paul (1855–1862)
- N. L. Shuldham (1862–1867)
- Henry Elford Luxmoore (1867–1871)
- Hendrick Agnis Chignell (1874–1878)
- Francis Hay Rawlins (1879)
- Henry Broadbent (1879–1886)
- Charles Lowry (1886–1893)
- Arthur Murray Goodhart (1894–1903)
- Cyril Alington (1904–1908)
- Aymer William Whitworth (1908–1917)
- John Foster Crace (1917–1923)
- Hugh Kenyon Marsden (1923–1930)
- John Vaughan Wilkes (1930–1937)
- Walter Hamilton (1937–1946)
- Frederick J. R. Coleridge (1946–1949)
- Stephen McWatters (1949–1957)
- Raef J. G. Payne (1957–1965)
- Peter Pilkington (1965–1975)
- John Lewis (1975–1980)
- Martin Hammond (1980–1984)
- Andrew Boggis (1985–1992)
- Joseph A. F. Spence (1992–2002)
- Gary J. Savage (2002–2006)
- Jane Louise Sillery (2006–2015)
- James A. G. Fulton (2015–2023)
- Tom A. Day (2023–present)
