= Kenneth Durham =

Kenneth Durham (died 6 August 2016) was a British schoolteacher, educationalist, and headmaster of University College School (1996-2013). He was the brother of Geoffrey Durham, the British comedy magician and actor who was married to writer and comedian Victoria Wood.

Durham was educated at St John's School, Leatherhead and studied at Brasenose College, Oxford. He taught economics at St Albans School, before becoming Director of Studies and Head of Economics at King's College School, Wimbledon. In 1996 he was appointed Headmaster of University College School, which is part of the Eton Group of independent schools. He wrote several books on Economics education.

Durham died, after a long illness, on 6 August 2016 at the age of 62.

== Headmasters' and Headmistresses' Conference ==
Durham was a member of the GSA/HMC Professional Development Sub-Committee and Chairman of the Headmasters' and Headmistresses' Conference (HMC). He was also a co-opted member of the HMC committee in 2006-07, being HMC Head of Professional Development.

== Selected publications ==
- Durham, K. (1992). The New City. Houndmills, Basingstoke, Hampshire: Macmillan.
