= Cambridge School of Bucharest =

The Cambridge School of Bucharest (CSB) is an international British School Overseas (BSO) located in Bucharest, Romania. Headquartered in Voluntari, CSB operates under the Fundația Mateas foundation.

== Accreditation and memberships ==
CSB is an accredited British School Overseas (BSO), inspected by the Independent Schools Inspectorate (ISI) on behalf of the UK Department for Education. The most recent inspection took place in May 2025, confirming that the school meets all British School Overseas standards and commending its leadership, safeguarding, and quality of teaching.

CSB is a member of the following international education associations:

- Association of British Schools Overseas (AoBSO)
- The Heads’ Conference (HMC)
- International Baccalaureate Organization (IBO) – as a certified IB World School, offering the IB Diploma Programme (IBDP)

In addition, CSB is UK National Online Safety certified and was recognised by the UK Safeguarding Alliance for excellence in child protection and safeguarding during the COVID-19 pandemic.

== Organisation and curriculum ==
The school follows the structure of the UK National Curriculum, divided into six key educational stages:

- Early Years Foundation Stage (EYFS)
- Key Stage 1
- Key Stage 2
- Key Stage 3
- Key Stage 4
- Key Stage 5 / Sixth Form

CSB offers IGCSEs, A Levels, and the IB Diploma Programme. Since 2002, the school has been a licensed examination centre for Cambridge International Examinations (CIE).

The curriculum combines academic subjects such as English, Mathematics, Science, Humanities, and Social Sciences at Key Stages 4 and 5. Students also take part in Sports (EYFS through Key Stage 5), Creative Arts, and Personal, Social, Citizenship and Economic Education (PSCHEE).

Languages offered include English, Mandarin Chinese, Romanian, Turkish, Arabic, French, Spanish, and German, reflecting the school’s diverse, multilingual community.

== History ==
The Cambridge School of Bucharest was founded in 1994.

In September 2020, the school moved to its purpose-built, modern campus in the Bucharest suburb of Pipera. The outstanding facilities include state-of-the-art science laboratories, modern sports complexes, creative arts studios, and advanced IT suites. The campus accommodates up to 1,400 students, offering an excellent, holistic learning environment that balances academic rigour with personal growth and wellbeing.

== Educational offerings ==
The curriculum combines core academic subjects—English, Mathematics, Science, Humanities, and Social Sciences—with a broad co-curricular programme in Sports, Creative Arts, and Personal, Social, Citizenship and Economic Education (PSCHEE).

The school promotes a holistic approach to learning through inquiry-based teaching, student leadership, and community service initiatives.

== Academic outcomes ==
CSB has a consistent record of academic success, with graduates progressing to leading universities worldwide, including top institutions in the United Kingdom, Europe, North America, and Asia.
