= Andrew Boggis =

English schoolmaster

Andrew Gurdon Boggis (born 1 April 1954) is an English schoolmaster. After teaching in Salzburg, he was Master in College at Eton, then Warden of Forest School, Walthamstow. He was chairman of the Headmasters' and Headmistresses' Conference and also a former Master of the Worshipful Company of Skinners.

== Life ==
The son of Lieutenant-Colonel Allan Boggis, by his marriage to Eirene Donald, Boggis was educated at Marlborough College, New College, Oxford, where he took his degree in modern languages, and King's College, Cambridge, where he followed a teaching course leading to a PGCE.

Boggis taught in Salzburg, then was an assistant master at Hitchin Boys' School for a year. In 1979 he joined the teaching staff of Eton, where he was Master-in-College from 1984 to 1992. He next went to Forest School as Warden (Principal) from 1992 to 2009. In 2001 he joined the Committee of the Headmasters' and Headmistresses' Conference and in 2006 was its Chairman. He has also served as a governor of several other schools: King's College School, Cambridge; the Skinners' Company's School for Girls; the Purcell School for Music; the Skinners' School; the Skinners' Kent Academy, where he was Chairman. Canford School, Sunninghill Prep and West Buckland School, where he was Chair. He was Director of HMC Projects in Central & Eastern Europe from 2012 - 2020.

Boggis was a member of the Independent Schools Examination Board from 1992 to 2001, chairing its Languages Committee for four years, a member of the Court of the University of Essex from 1997 to 2004, and of the Education Committee of the English Speaking Union from 2004 to 2010.

In 1990 he became a liveryman of the Skinners' Company, then after serving as a member of its Court was elected Master of the Company for the year 2011–2012. He is also a member of the East India Club.

== Family ==
In 1983, Boggis married Fiona Mary Cocke. They have one son and two daughters and live at Hooke, near Beaminster in Dorset.
