= Walter Hamilton (Master of Magdalene College) =

Walter Hamilton (10 February 1908 – 8 February 1988) was a schoolmaster and later Master of Magdalene College, Cambridge.

== Life ==
Hamilton was the son of Walter George Hamilton, a tea trader in the City of London, and his wife, Caroline Mary Stiff, a schoolmistress. He was educated at St Dunstan's College in London followed by university at Trinity College, Cambridge, where he was awarded a first-class BA degree in Classics. He won the Craven University Scholarship in 1927, Chancellor's Classical Medal in 1928 and Porson Prize in the same year. He was awarded a distinction in Part II of the Classical Tripos in 1929. He was a fellow of Trinity between 1931 and 1935. He was also an Assistant Lecturer at the University of Manchester from 1931-32. He was an Assistant Master at Eton from 1933 to 1946, and was Master in College there from 1937 to 1946. In 1946 he returned to Trinity College, serving as Fellow and Classical Lecturer until 1950, and as a tutor from 1947.

In 1950 Hamilton became headmaster of Westminster School, and in 1957 became headmaster of Rugby School, a position he held until 1966. In 1967 he was elected Master of Magdalene College, Cambridge, serving in that position until 1978, and became an honorary fellow of the college on retirement.

Hamilton's academic and public service positions included:

- Editor of the Classical Quarterly
- Chairman of the Lord Kitchener National Memorial Fund Scholarship Committee (1953–59)
- Member of the Headmasters' Conference
- Member of the Board of Governors of Shrewsbury School (1968–81)
- Member of the Governing Bodies Association (1969–74)
- Member of the Executive Committee of the British Council (1958–70)
- Member of the Council of the Senate of Cambridge University (1969–74).
- Fellow of the Royal Society of Literature (1957)
- Awarded an honorary D.Litt. by Durham University (1958).

He translated Ammianus Marcellinus's The Later Roman Empire as well as Plato's Symposium, Gorgias, and Phaedrus and Letters VII and VIII.

In March 1951 Hamilton married Jane Burrows in King Henry VII's Chapel at Westminster Abbey. They had four children: three sons and a daughter (the explorer, Caroline Hamilton)

A complete biographical description on Walter Hamilton is provided in a book published in 1992.
