= Anthony Verity =

British educationalist

Anthony Courtenay Froude Verity (born 25 February 1939) is an educationalist and classical scholar and was Master of Dulwich College from 1986 to 1995.

== Early life ==
He was born the son of Arthur and Alice Kathleen Verity. He was educated at Queen Elizabeth's Hospital, Bristol and then went on to Pembroke College, Cambridge from where he received his MA. In 1962 he married Patricia Ann Siddall with whom he has one son and one daughter.

== Career ==
Having completed his education he went on to become Assistant Master from 1962 to 1965 at Dulwich College, the school he would later head. He then went on to Manchester Grammar School until 1969 when he took up the post as Head of Classics at Bristol Grammar School, a position he held until 1976. Whilst at the school he became editor of the publication Greece and Rome (from 1971 until 1977). In 1976 he took up his first headmastership at Leeds Grammar School from where he left to become Master of Dulwich College in 1986. During his time at Dulwich College he became Chairman of the Schools Arabic Project from 1988 to 1996 and also acted as a trustee of Dulwich Picture Gallery from 1994 to 1996. Verity had a long association with the Joint Association of Classical Teachers and with its Greek Summer School at Dean Close School, Cheltenham, and acted as its Director on an occasional basis.

Following his suspension and resignation from Dulwich College in 1995 he became Educational Advisor to the Emir of Qatar in 1996. He is a member of the Athenaeum Club.

== Bibliography ==
- Latin as Literature - 1971

=== Translations ===
- The Idylls of Theocritus - 2002
- Pindar (2008). The Complete Odes. Translated by Anthony Verity. Oxford University Press.
- Theocritus (2008). Idylls. Translated by Anthony Verity. Oxford University Press.
- Homer (2012). The Iliad. Translated by Anthony Verity. Oxford University Press.
- Homer (2018). The Odyssey. Translated by Anthony Verity. Oxford University Press.

=== Critical studies and reviews of Verity's work ===
The Odyssey (2018)

- Burrow, Colin (26 April 2018). "Light through the fog". London Review of Books. 40 (8): 3–7.

Academic offices
| Preceded by David Emms | Master of Dulwich College; 1986–1995 | Succeeded by George Graham Able; Christopher Field, the Deputy Master was Acting Master during 1996 |
