= Dani Howard =

British composer (born 1993)

- Born: 1993 (age 32–33)
- Education: Royal College of Music
- Occupation: Composer

Dani Howard (born 1993) is a British composer.

She was born in Hong Kong, where she attended the South Island School. She attended the Royal College of Music between 2011 and 2015, where she studied composition with Jonathan Cole as a Rose Williams Scholar.

Since graduating, she has worked with orchestras including the Royal Liverpool Philharmonic Orchestra, City Chamber Orchestra of Hong Kong, Southbank Sinfonia, Orchestra Vitae, and Bloomington Symphony Orchestra. Most recently she has been one of the composers-in-residence at the International Suoni Dal Golfo Festival of Music and Poetry.

In 2017, she was selected by ClassicFM to write a new work celebrating the 25th anniversary of the classical music radio station. Written for orchestra, her piece 'Argentum' was premiered by the Royal Liverpool Philharmonic Orchestra at the Royal Albert Hall in September 2017.

She was a finalist in the 2014 and 2015 editions of the International Antonín Dvořák Composition Competition, held in Prague. In both years, she won the Junior 3rd Special Prize for the best free composition in the junior category

Her works have been released on NonClassical, Listenpony, and TYXart record labels, and broadcast on BBC Radio 3, BBC 4, ClassicFM and RTHK.

Her opera The Yellow Wallpaper, based on the 1892 short story by Charlotte Perkins Gilman, with libretto by Joseph Spence, premiered in August 2023 at the Copenhagen Opera Festival.

== List of works ==
=== Orchestral/large ensemble ===
- Trombone Concerto – Trombone and orchestra (ww: 2122, brass: 3221, perc: 2 + timp+hp, strings)
- Ellipsis – Symphony Orchestra (ww: 3333, Brass: 4331, perc: 4 + timp, 2 harp, celeste, strings)
- Coalescence – Symphony Orchestra (ww: 3333, brass: 4331, perc: 4+timp+hp, strings)
- Argentum – Symphony Orchestra (ww: 3333, brass: 4331, perc: 3+timp, harp, strings)
- Arches – Symphony Orchestra (ww: 2233, brass: 4331, perc: 4+timp+harp, strings)
- Gates of Spring – Symphony Orchestra (ww: 2222, brass: 4231, perc: 5+timp+harp, strings)
- MIA TErra – Symphony Orchestra and Chorus (ww: 3333, brass: 4331, perc: 4+timp, harp, strings, SATB chorus)
- Verticality – Chamber Orchestra (ww: 3230, brass: 1210 (optional 2110), perc: 4+timp, piano, strings)
- Silver Falls – String Orchestra
- Heroes – Chamber Orchestra and Children's Choir (ww: 2222, brass: 2200 perc: 2, strings)
- Fanfare – Brass Ensemble (brass: 4441)
- Jigsaw – For mixed-ability symphony orchestra and electronics – two difficulty levels in all parts including: ww + sx, bs, strings, hp, pno & perc
- Blinded by the Light – String orchestra and Youth Brass (strings: 4321 brass: 2210 minimum) – can include as many players as available
- Introspection for 24 Percussionists
- Robin Hood – Opera (90 minutes) – (five singers, 10 piece ensemble)
- The Yellow Wallpaper – Opera (50 minutes) – (solo mezzo-soprano, cello, piano, dancer)

=== Chamber music ===
- Neverland – Saxophone Quartet
- Ostara – Piano, Cello & Clarinet
- Ascending to Serenity – Piano Violin & Bass Clarinet
- What Lies Beneath Rings – Percussion Octet
- Blue Pavilion – Brass Quintet
- Strings – Trumpet, Trombone & Percussion
- Sieve – Percussion Quartet and Baritone
- Remonte – Percussion Quartet
- Unbound – Vocal Octet (SSAATTBB)
- The Den – Cello, Guitar & Flute

=== Solo/duo ===
- Dualism – Violin and Piano
- The Earl of St. Vincent – Solo Piano
- Mind Games – Solo Percussion
- Two-and-a-half Minutes to Midnight – Solo Soprano Recorder
- Two-and-a-half Minutes to Midnight – arr. Solo Piccolo
- Parallel Lines – Trombone and Percussion
- Symmetry – Violin Duo
- Momentums – Solo Tuba and Tape
- DragonSnap! – Clarinet Duet
- Chrysalis – Piano and Cello
- Lacuna – Solo Piano (for beginners)
- Shades – Solo Percussion and loop pedal
- Revs – for solo timpani (ABRSM Grade 5 syllabus)

The Vino Encores: A series of encores for solo instrument and wineglass

- An Encore for Clarinet and Wine (1"25)
- An Encore for Trumpet and Wine (2"00)
- An Encore for Bassoon and Wine (1"45)
- An Encore for Oboe and Wine (2"30)
