= James Fulton (English cricketer) =

English cricketer (born 1977)

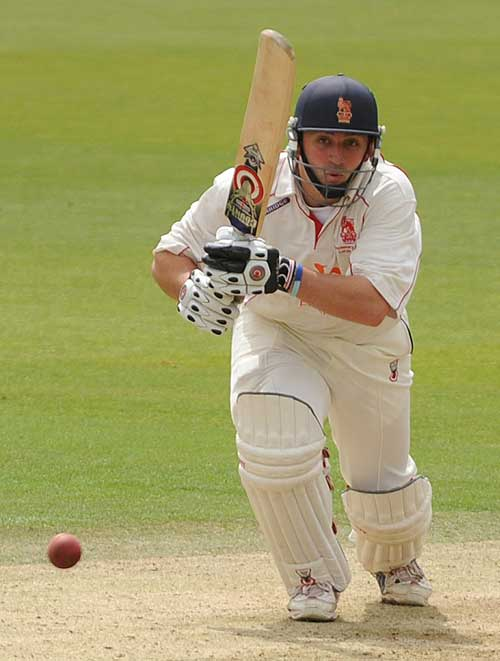
- James Fulton in 2008

Personal information
- Full name: James Anthony Gervase Fulton
- Born: 21 September 1977 (age 49); Plymouth, England
- Batting: Left-handed
- Bowling: Right-arm Medium fast
- Role: Batsman

Domestic team information
- Years: Team
- 1997-1999: Oxford University Cricket Club

Career statistics
Competition	FC
Matches	21
Runs scored	679
Batting average	19.40
100s/50s	0/5
Top score	78
Balls bowled	36
Wickets	0
Bowling average	–
5 wickets in innings	–
10 wickets in match	–
Best bowling	–
Catches/stumpings	11/–
- Source: Cricinfo, 16 November 2024

James Fulton (born 21 September 1977) is an English former cricketer. He played 21 first-class matches for Oxford University Cricket Club between 1997 and 1999.

Fulton, a left-handed batter, played in 10 first-class matches in 1997, scoring 451 runs at an average of 23.73. He scored four half centuries, against Durham, Sussex (where he scored 50 and 46), Nottinghamshire and in the Varsity Match against Cambridge University, where he scored 78 in the first innings, with a stand of 103 between him and captain Mark Wagh.

He was appointed captain in 1998, playing in all the team's eight first-class matches, scoring 180 runs at an average of 16.36, with his highest score (and only half-century) 78 against Yorkshire.

He only played in three first-class matches in 1999, the final year of first-class cricket against counties by Oxford University, scoring 48 runs at an average of 9.6, with a highest score of 30.

After finishing university, Fulton joined the British Army. He represented them at cricket including captaining the side in their centenary match against the Royal Navy at Lord's in August 2008, a contest in which he top-scored with 115.

In 2015 he became Master in College at Eton College.

== See also ==
- List of Oxford University Cricket Club players
