= Al Sufouh Archaeological Site =

Archaeological site in Dubai

Coordinates: 25°6′42.42″N 55°10′32.22″E

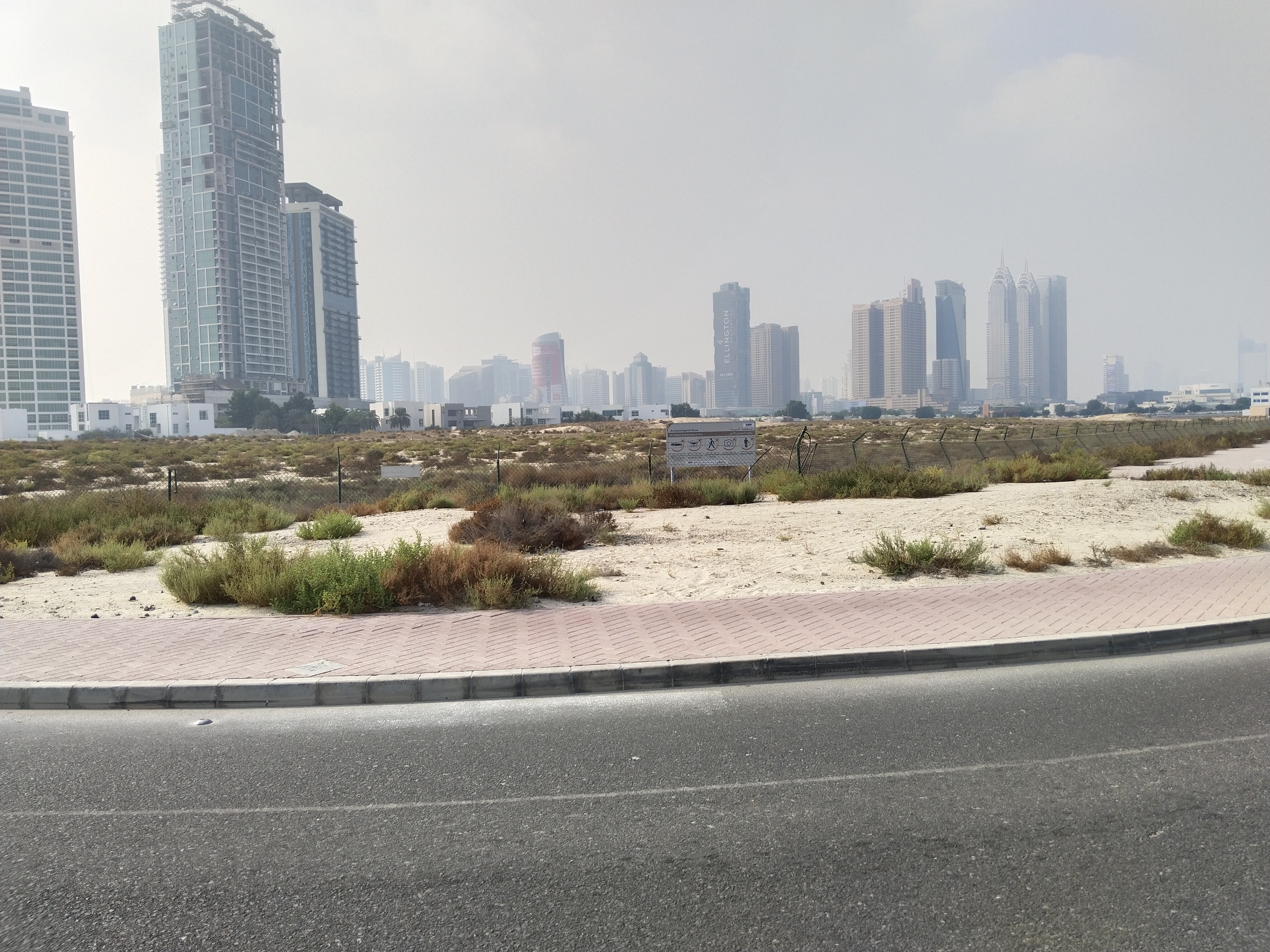
Al Sufouh Archaeological Site at Al Sufouh in Dubai

Al Sufouh Archaeological Site at Al Sufouh in Dubai is owned and managed by Dubai Culture & Arts Authority, and consists of extensive but scattered areas of ancient occupation by a population known as the Magan. The site is distinguished by heavy concentrations of burnt ash, shell, pottery and bones on its surface.

The archaeological excavation conducted at the site between 1994 and 1995 revealed an Umm Al-Nar type circular tomb dating between 2500 and 2000 B.C. The tomb is circular, 6.5 m in diameter and constructed of unworked stone blocks faced with a single outer ring wall of well-masoned ashlars. Entry to the tomb is through two doorways on opposite points of the ring wall on a NE/SW alignment. Double access was necessary as the internal NW/SE dividing wall allowed no communication between the two halves of the tomb. Each half of the tomb was divided into three chambers. The closest structural analogs to Al-Sufouh are found at Hili Archaeological Park in the Al Ain oasis, and at Umm Al-Nar Island.

Individual interments were found in flexed position with various grave goods, including ceramic vessels of Umm Al-Nar type, bronze weaponry, and large quantities of beads.

== See also ==
- List of Ancient Settlements in the UAE
