= Joseph Spence (headmaster) =

Master of Dulwich College

- Born: 18 December 1959 (age 66)
- Occupation: Master of Dulwich College

Academic background
- Education: St Philip's School; Salesian College, Battersea
- Alma mater: University of Reading (BA); Birkbeck, University of London (PhD)

Joseph Arthur Francis Spence was the Master of Dulwich College from 2009-2024. He was previously Headmaster of Oakham School and Master in College at Eton College.

== Early life ==
Spence was born on 18 December 1959. He was educated at St Philip's School, a grammar school in Edgbaston, Birmingham, England, and at Salesian College, Battersea, a Roman Catholic school in Battersea, London. He studied modern history and politics at the University of Reading, graduating with a Bachelor of Arts (BA) degree. He then undertook postgraduate research at Birkbeck College, University of London, completing his Doctor of Philosophy (PhD) degree in 1991. His doctoral thesis was titled "The philosophy of Irish Toryism, 1833-52: a study of reactions to liberal reformism in Ireland in the generation between the first Reform Act and the Famine: with especial reference to expressions of national feeling among Protestant ascendancy".

== Education career ==
From 1987 to 1992, Spence taught history and politics at Eton College, a public boys boarding school in Eton, Berkshire. He served as Master in College, responsible for the boarding house containing the King's Scholars, from 1992 to 2002. He then moved to Oakham School, a co-educational private school in Rutland, where he was Headmaster. In 2009, he became Master of Dulwich College, a boys private school in South London. In December 2023 he announced his retirement which was planned for 2025. However, in August 2024 he announced he was stepping down after an incident with a member of staff during a staff party.

== Literary work ==
Spence wrote the libretto for The Yellow Wallpaper, an opera by British composer Dani Howard based on the 1892 short story by Charlotte Perkins Gilman, which premiered at the Copenhagen Opera Festival in August 2023.

== Honours and awards ==
In May 2024, Spence was shortlisted for the Times Education Supplement Independent Headteacher of the Year. He was announced as the winner of the award in June 2024, citing his work to promote "Free Learning" and Equity, Diversity, and Inclusion.

Academic offices
Preceded by Graham G. Able	Master of Dulwich College; 2009–2024	Incumbent
