= Al Sufouh =

Al Sufouh الصفوح
- Community
- Interactive map of Al Sufouh
- Coordinates: 25.11894°N 55.18355°E
- Country: United Arab Emirates
- Emirate: Dubai
- City: Dubai
- Boroughs: List: Al Sufouh 1; Al Sufouh 2

Area
  - Total: 7.6 km^{2} (2.9 sq mi)

Population (2000)
  - Total: 3,337
  - Density: 440/km^{2} (1,100/sq mi)

Al Sufouh (Arabic: الصفوح) is a locality in Dubai, United Arab Emirates (UAE). Located in western Dubai, Al Sufouh contains many new real estate developments and is home to several free economic clusters such as Dubai Knowledge Village and Dubai Internet City. Al Sufouh lies along Dubai's Persian Gulf coast and comprises two sub-communities:

- Al Sufouh 1 begins at the intersection of routes D 63 (Umm Saqeem Street) and D 94 (Al Sufouh Road) near Madinat Jumeirah. Dubai Police Academy, GEMS Wellington International School and Mina A'Salam are located in Al Sufouh 1.
- Al Sufouh 2 is located south of Palm Jumeirah. Several free zone economic clusters such as Dubai Internet City, Dubai Knowledge Village and Dubai Media City are located in Al Sufouh 2. Additionally, the area houses Dubai College, the International School of Choueifat, the American University of Dubai and Hard Rock Cafe, Dubai. The Dubai portion of the soon to be developed Logo Island will be part of the Al Sufouh 2 locality.

The Palm Jumeirah lies to the north of Al Sufouh. It is bounded to the south by Emirates Hills and Al Barsha. In September 2016, H.E. Sheikh Mohammed bin Rashid Al Maktoum, the Ruler of Dubai, ordered that Al Sufouh Street, a major street in the district, be renamed King Salman Street after King Salman bin Abdulaziz Al Saud of Saudi Arabia.

== See also ==
- Al Sufouh Archaeological Site
