= American International School of Bucharest =

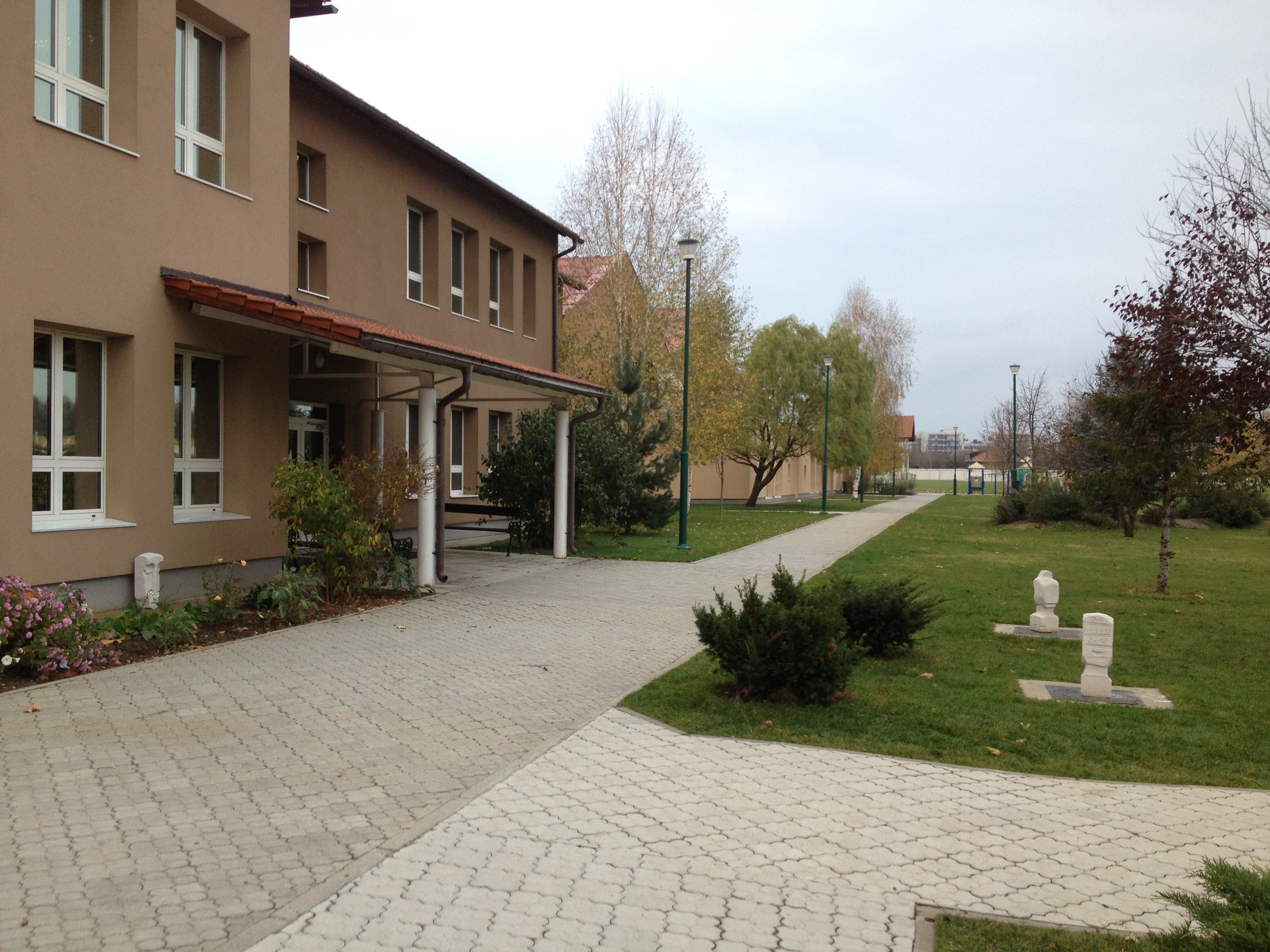
- Main entrance to the combined middle/high school building on AISB Campus

Location
- Bulevardul Pipera 196, Voluntari 077190; Romania
- Coordinates: 44.52922°N 26.145047°E

Information
- School type: International Baccalaureate Private International School
- Established: 1962 September 1st
- School district: Voluntari
- Superintendent: Rachel Caldwell
- Principal: Rosella Diliberto (Early Learning), Jane Cooper (Elementary), Melanie Kempe (Secondary)
- Faculty: 280+
- Grades: University
- Enrollment: 1000+
- Campus size: 101,117 square meters
- Campus type: Open courtyard
- Colors: Green and Black
- Mascot: Vampire
- Website: www.aisb.ro

The American International School of Bucharest (AISB) is a multicultural and international school located in the town of Voluntari, 5 km outside central Bucharest, Romania, set on a 10 hectare campus. English is the primary instructional language. The school was founded in 1962 by the United States Embassy. It is one of the only schools in Romania authorized to offer students the International Baccalaureate (IB) program. This includes the IB Primary Years, Middle Years and Diploma programmes.

The school currently serves a population of 955 students from 66 countries globally.

== Education ==
Since 1997, the American International School of Bucharest is an accredited IB World School. Both the New England Association of Schools and Colleges and the international nonprofit Council of International Schools organization have accredited the curriculum. As of the 2019–2020 academic year, total enrollment is approximately 950 students from 60 nationalities with an average of 18 students per class.

=== Technology In Education ===
During the 2012–2013 academic year, AISB implemented a 1:1 'bring your own device' laptop program for all students in grades 5 to 10, which later expanded during the 2013–2014 academic year to include all students from grades 5 to 12. The laptop program encouraged other initiatives which included the implementation of a high-speed 10 Mbit/s internet connection, improved access control with the printer infrastructure, and campus-wide WiFi internet access. AISB now uses Apple software as their primary operating system.

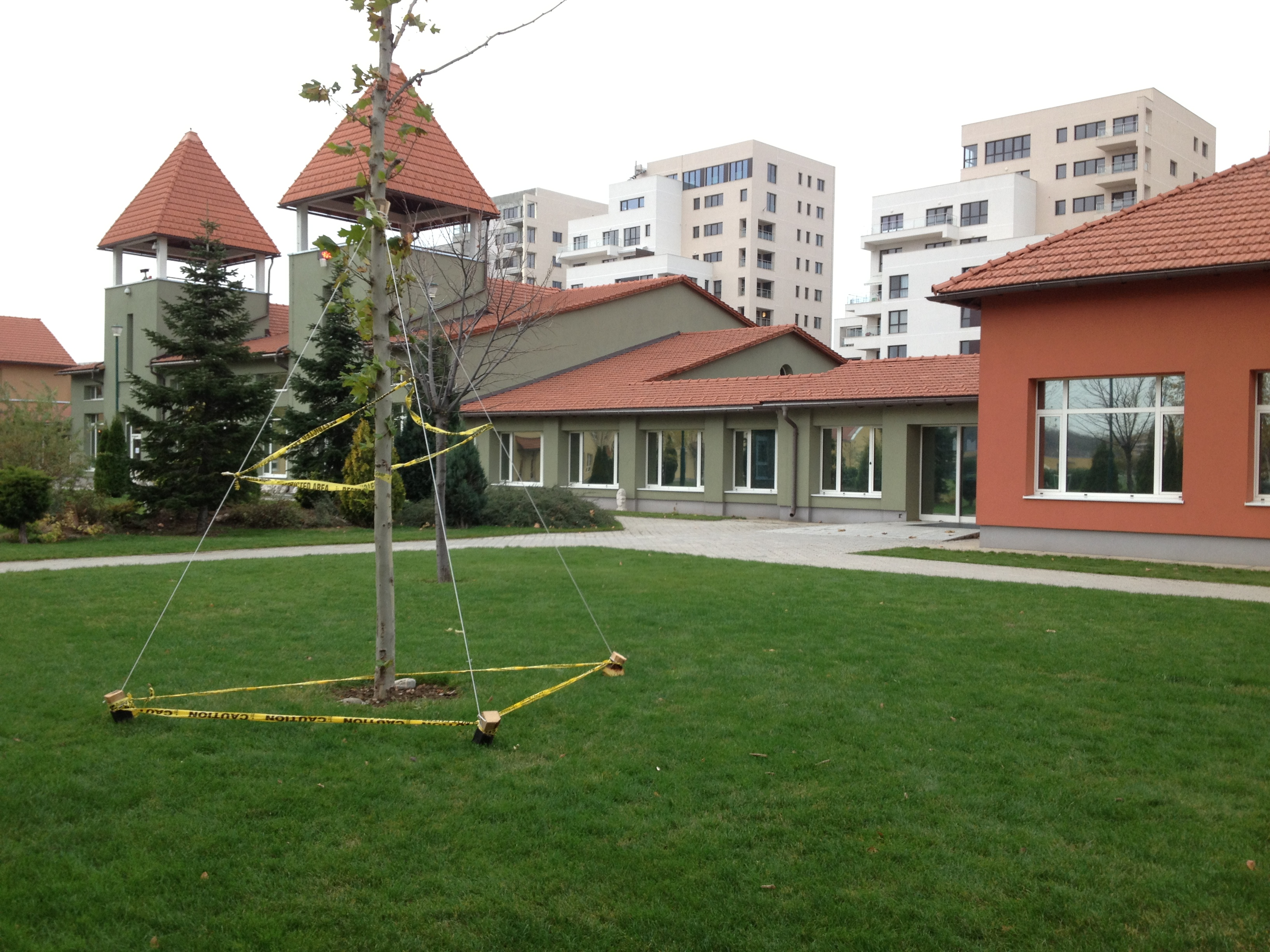
View to the AISB Library Media Center
