= Japanese School in Bucharest =

- ブカレスト日本人学校; Școala Japoneză din București

Location
- Strada Erou Iancu Nicolae, Nr. 91E; Voluntari, Ilfov County; Romania; 44°30′44″N 26°7′4″E

Information
- Type: Japanese international school
- Established: 1979
- Website: jpschool.ro

The Japanese School in Bucharest (ブカレスト日本人学校, Bukaresuto Nihonjin Gakkō; Romanian: Școala Japoneză din București) is a Japanese international school located at 91E Erou Iancu Nicolae Street, Voluntari, Ilfov County, Romania, near Bucharest. Previously it was located in Bucharest proper. The school is affiliated with the Embassy of Japan in Bucharest.

== History ==
In December 1975, the Japanese community of Bucharest requested that a Japanese school open in their community. In 1977 the Japanese government granted this licence.

The school opened in 1979. The school receives funds from tuition and the Japanese government. As of 2005 the monthly school fee was 270 euros. In order for a student to be eligible to attend, they have to speak Japanese.

== Student body ==
In 1986 there were 32 students. As of 2005 the school had 21 students. In 2006 there were 20 students, with a class average of 3 per class.

The parents of students tend to be company employees, Japanese restaurant owners, diplomats, and teachers. After the 9th grade students tend to study in international schools in Romania or travel outside of Romania to get a high school education. Minoru Nishida, the school's director, stated in 2005 that the student body fluctuated depending on business opportunities in Romania; in 1986 there was an influx of Japanese businesspeople in Romania and therefore the student body had increased.

== Recreation ==
This school holds an autumn festival.
