= Dubai College =

Private selective school in Dubai, United Arab Emirates

- كلية دبي
- Dubai College Emblem

Location
- P.O. Box 837; Al Sufouh; Dubai; United Arab Emirates; 25.1103°N 55.1689°E

Information
- School type: Non-profit institution Independent school
- Motto: Work hard, play hard. Be neat; be civil; be co-operative.
- Established: 1978
- Founder: Tim Charlton
- Authority: KHDA
- Headmasters: 2025-Present Tomas Duckling 2015-2024; Michael Lambert 2010-2015; Peter Hill 2008-2010; Carlo Ferrario 1989-2008; Eric Parton Other; Harry Deelman; Tom Jackson Tim Charlton
- Teaching staff: 133
- Years: Year 7-13
- Gender: Both
- Age range: 11-18
- Enrollment: 1085 students
- Average class size: 22
- Education system: British National Curriculum
- Campus: Urban
- Houses: Barbarossa; Chichester; Cousteau; Heyerdahl
- Colours: Brick Red and Navy Blue
- Slogan: "A tradition of quality in education"
- Sports: Rugby Union; Football; Cricket; Netball; Basketball
- Nickname: DC
- Rival: Dubai English Speaking College (amongst others)
- Newspaper: DConstructed
- Yearbook: Shamal
- School fees: AED 82,482 - AED 93,399
- Affiliations: Headmasters' and Headmistresses' Conference; Council of British International Schools; British Schools of the Middle East
- Website: www.dubaicollege.org
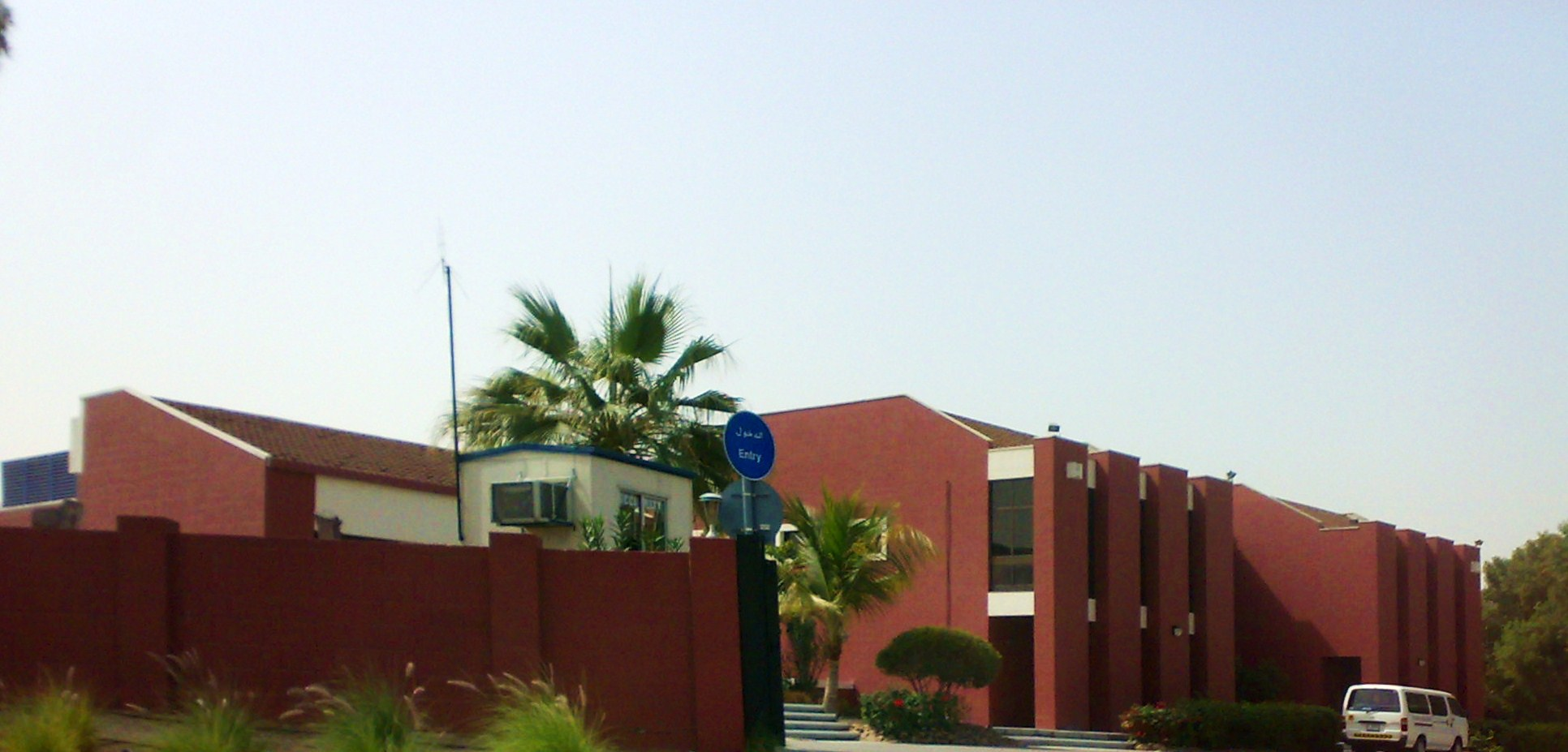
- Old view of Dubai College from Hessa Street.

Dubai College (DC) is a selective entry British school in Dubai, United Arab Emirates. Established in 1978, the school caters for students from Years 7 to 13, and is situated in the Al Sufouh area of Dubai. Students prepare for the National Curriculum for England GCSE and A-Level examinations. It is a not for profit organisation, and is administered by a board of governors, currently chaired by British chartered accountant, Edward Quinlan.

Dubai College is considered one of the UAE's most prestigious schools. It is included in The Schools Index that lists world's leading 150 schools.

The Headmaster, and the school, is a member of the HMC, COBIS and British Schools of the Middle East.

The school is included in The Schools Index as one of the 150 best private schools in the world and among the top 15 schools in the Middle East.

== History ==
Dubai College was founded in 1978 under an Emiri decree issued by the late Ruler of Dubai, Sheikh Rashid bin Saeed Al Maktoum, with the now famous instruction: "Build us a school, here".

Before the school moved to its current location, it was housed in two small villas near Safa Park. Dubai College started its first year with five teachers and twenty two pupils.

The Board of Governors set up a debenture system and arranged bank loans to fund a permanent building for the school. The contracted architectural firm was Brewer, Smith and Brewer. In 1979, the first school building, now dubbed A Block, was constructed.

After some years of absence, the school has reintroduced a compulsory debenture system, payable for all new pupils entering the school from September 2015.

Dubai College was selected to host the COBIS Secondary Games 2016.

== KHDA inspection report ==
The Knowledge and Human Development Authority (KHDA) is an educational quality assurance authority based in Dubai, United Arab Emirates. It undertakes early learning, school and higher learning institution management and rates them as well.

A summary of the inspection ratings for Dubai College.

| 2018-2022 | 2017-2018 | 2016-2017 | 2015-2016 | 2014-2015 | 2013-2014 | 2012-2013 | 2011-2012 | 2010-2011 | 2009-2010 | 2008-2009 |
|---|---|---|---|---|---|---|---|---|---|---|
| Outstanding | Outstanding | Outstanding | Outstanding | Outstanding | Outstanding | Outstanding | Outstanding | Outstanding | Good | Good |

A summary of all the schools in Dubai's ratings can be found at KHDA School Ratings.

=== School fees ===
The school fees for 2018–2019 are AED 80,808 for Year 7 to Year 11 and AED 91,503 for Year 12 and Year 13. A Personal Debenture is required for all new students joining the school to the value of AED 25,000, which will be returned less any outstanding sums owing when the student leaves.

== Campus ==
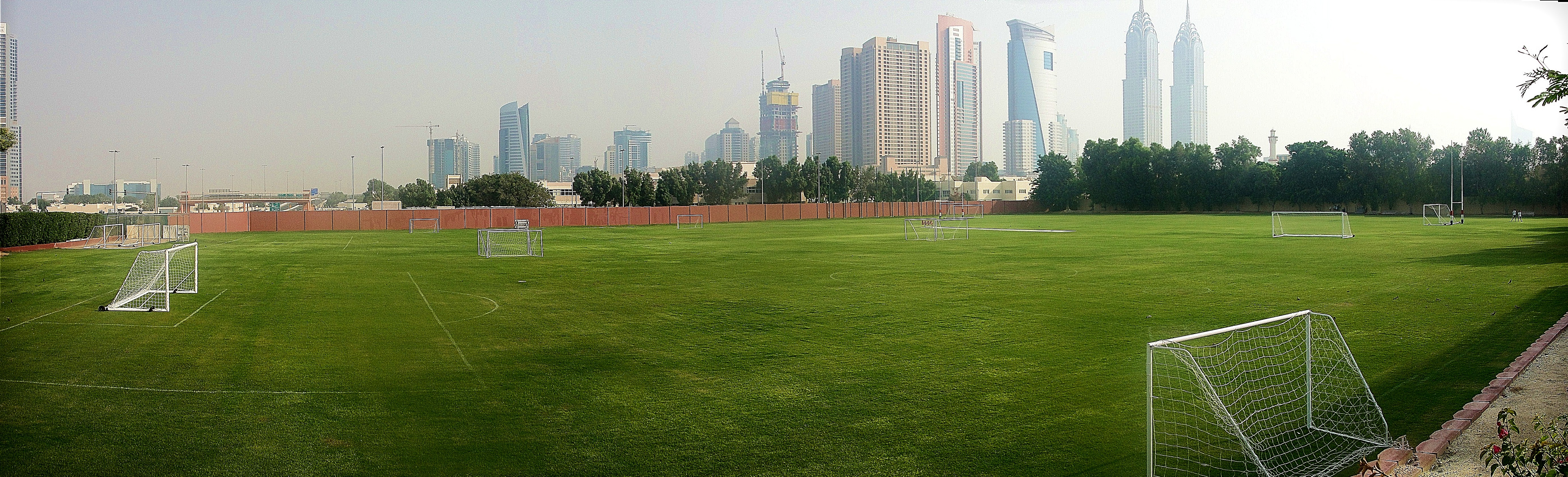
Sports field of Dubai College, showing rugby posts and cricket pitch in distance.

The campus of Dubai College offers many facilities such as a large sports field with rugby pitches, football pitches, a cricket pitch and cricket nets as well as astroturf tennis courts and netball courts. There are also 3 Design and Technology workshops, a Music Centre with a recording studio, and a specialised Art department. The school has 5 computer suites, with internet access.

A new 950-seat auditorium began construction in 2007, and was opened in 2009. A Wi-Fi network was implemented into the Sixth Form centre in 2010 and the entire school in 2011.

The school has recently built a Sports Pavilion. In 2018 the school opened a new Reception Building and a Teaching and Learning Centre.

In 2020 the school built a new SPACE building (sports and performing arts center of excellence) which currently houses the indoor gym, fitness suite and swimming pool. It also houses the state of the art black box theatre, drama classrooms and several individual music practice rooms.

In 2024, the new Jafar center was opened spanning three floors housing the maths, art and computer science departments as well as a cafe, the library, several harkness rooms and DC studios.

In 2026, The A block was replaced with a new building. The new A block is home to the English, History and Politics department and at its heart sits a dedicated area for debating, Model UN and the new DC Scholars Series in Year 11 called the forum, Providing students with opportunities to develop their oracy, leadership and public speaking skills.

== Student body ==
As of 2018 there were 951 students, with 50% originating from British families and the remainder from other foreign nationalities.

== Extracurricular activities ==
Over 130 extracurricular activities are participated in by Dubai College students including the Duke of Edinburgh's Award, and F1 in Schools.

=== Athletics ===
Dubai College students annually partake in the 'Fab 5' athletics tournament, competing against other schools in the area. The college also competes in athletic competitions on a regular basis at Rashid School for Boys. The school also participates in the annual British Schools in the Middle East Games.

=== Debating ===
Dubai College is considered one of the leading schools for Debating in Dubai. They have successfully competed at various international and regional Debate tournaments and competitions, including the British Schools of the Middle East Debating Tournament, Debate Dubai, Cambridge Union Schools Debating Competition and COBIS Student World Debate Competition. Students from the school have also been selected to represent the UAE at the World Schools Debating Championship.

=== Rugby ===
Dubai College annually hosts the Dubai College Rugby 7's, and the Dubai College Rugby 10's tournaments. School teams from all over the United Arab Emirates and from the Persian Gulf are invited, and all the proceeds go to charity. Regular participants include The English College, Doha College, and Jumeirah College.

Dubai College also participates in the Gulf Under 18 Men section of the Dubai Sevens, and in an annual tour of Hong Kong preceding the Hong Kong Sevens.

=== F1 in Schools ===
In 2010 Dubai College participated in the F1 in Schools competition. Out of four Dubai College representative teams, Team Impulse won the UAE National Finals, and went on to represent the United Arab Emirates in the International Finals in Singapore. They won the Outstanding sportsmanship award. In the 2011 F1 in Schools UAE National Championships, two teams from Dubai College were entered, Team RedShift and Revolution Racing. Revolution Racing came 2nd overall, which means they will collaborate with a Malaysian team and compete in the world finals. Team RedShift won the Best Verbal Presentation award, as well as being named the 2011 F1 in Schools UAE National Champions. In 2017 Dubai College again participated in the F1 in Schools competition represented by only one team, Team Velocity. Team Velocity won the Best Verbal Presentation award and came 3rd overall.

=== Golf ===
Students from Dubai College annually create a workforce of over 100 people from years 9 and 10 to perform scoring duties at the Dubai Ladies Masters and the Dubai Desert Classic. They have also been scorers at the DP World Tour Championship, Dubai, the season-ending event of the European Tour.

== Controversies ==
=== Resignation of the headmaster ===
In 2009, schools in Dubai were subject to inspection by the KHDA, who separated schools into one of four categories; Outstanding, Good, Acceptable and Unsatisfactory. The assessments sparked significant controversy, partly because of the decision to link tuition increases to the results of the inspections. Outstanding schools were allowed fee increases by 15%, Good schools by 12%, Acceptable schools by 10%, and Unsatisfactory schools by 7%, diverging from the previous uniform allowance of an 8% increase each year.

The then headmaster of Dubai College, Dr. Carlo Ferrario, subsequently announced his resignation, citing government interference in the school's operations as the chief reason.

In a letter sent to parents of students, Ferrario was critical of the school inspections launched in the previous year, and said he would depart at the end of the academic year because of significant changes in the "educational landscape". "Over the past two years this has changed markedly, with the level of intervention from external agencies ... reaching levels that, in my view, compromise [the school’s] independence," Ferrario said in the letter. "While school inspection is important and I applaud it, I believe the system of inspection that has been adopted in Dubai presents more disadvantages than benefits for schools like Dubai College," he said. "It is not a regime with which I feel able to work."

Dubai College was given a result of Good, the second highest rating, in both the 2009 and 2010 inspections.

Ralph Tabberer, the chief of schools at Global Education Management Systems, said of Ferrario; "Carlo Ferrario is an outstanding educator, so we need to take notice of his comments on inspections. They are supposed to drive out the weak, not the strong". The owner of GEMS Education, Sunny Varkey, has also been critical of the inspections.

=== Fraud by accountant employee ===
In 2011, Dubai College discovered that they had been defrauded to the sum of DH 15,770,000 by an accounting department employee who proceeded to flee the UAE to India, his home country. The theft took place over 16 months, beginning in June 2010.

The fraudster was ordered to repay the DH 15,770,000 he had stolen from the school, as well as being ordered to serve a 5-year prison sentence. As of March 2021 the employee has not been found, nor has the money been recovered.

== Notable alumni ==
- Andrew Chetcuti, Maltese Olympic swimmer
- Jessica Ellerby, actress
- Natacha Karam, Actor
- Ross Vintcent, Italian Rugby Player
- Tom Weston-Jones, Actor
- Dinuk Wijeratne, Musician Symphony Nova Scotia
- Ed Jones, IndyCar driver
- Omar Daair OBE, British High Commissioner to Rwanda and Ambassador to Burundi
- Kaivalya Vohra, Zepto co-founder

== Gallery ==
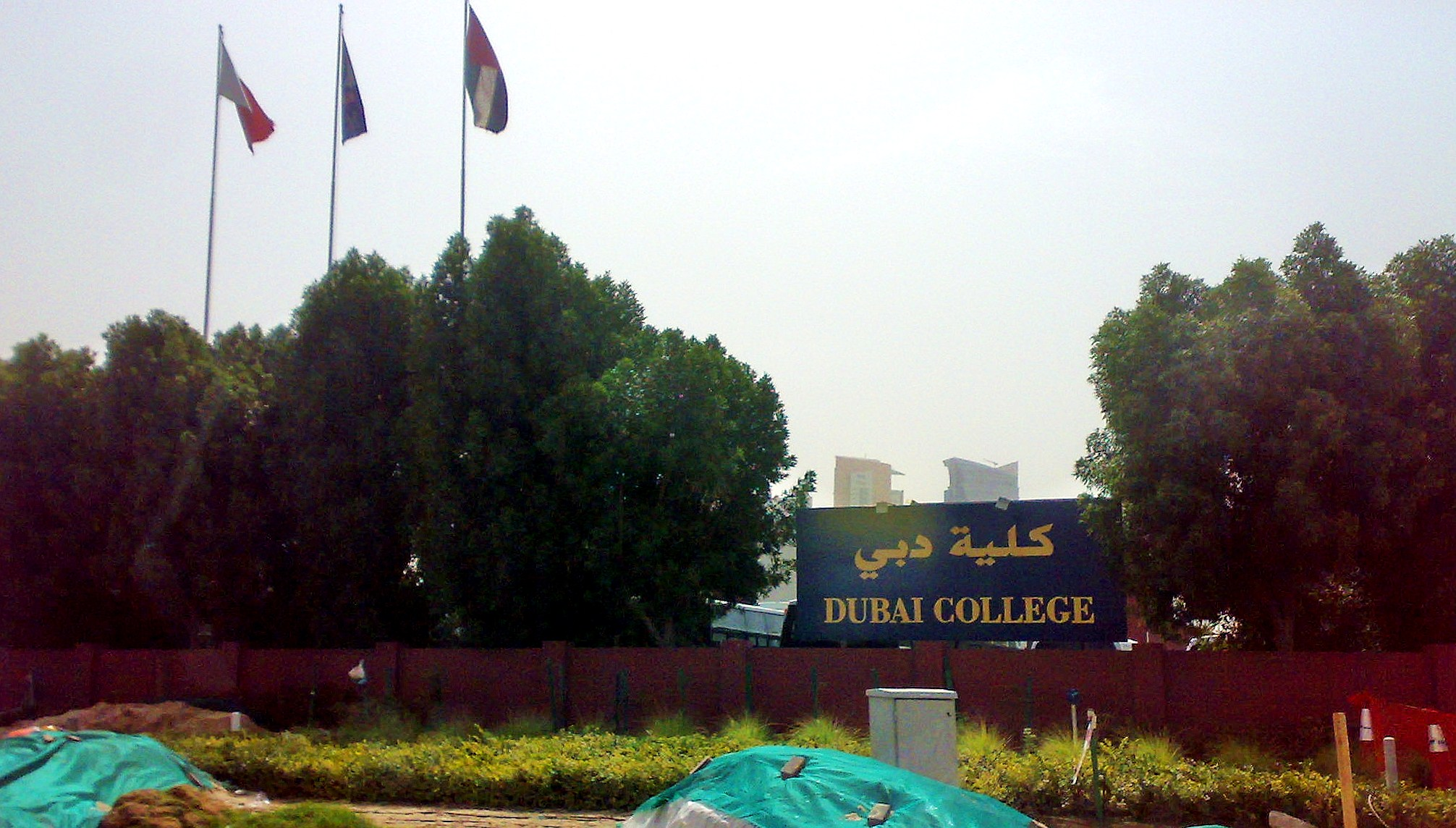
Dubai College signpost.
