= British School of Bucharest =

Location
- Strada Erou Iancu Nicolae, Nr. 42; Voluntari, Ilfov County; Romania
- Coordinates: 44.5148°N 26.1337°E

Information
- Type: British international school
- Established: 2000
- Head teacher: Jason Porter (Secondary School)
- Age: 2 to 18
- Enrollment: ~700
- Language: English
- Website: britishschool.ro

British School of Bucharest (BSB) is a British international school in Voluntari, near Bucharest, Romania. Founded in 2000, it educates around 700 pupils aged 2 to 18 from more than 65 nationalities, and follows the National Curriculum for England leading to IGCSE and A-Level examinations. The school has been rated Excellent in all areas by the UK Independent Schools Inspectorate (ISI) in 2018, 2022 and 2025.

== History and profile ==
The school was established in 2000 to provide English-medium education in Romania and has grown to encompass Early Years, Primary and Secondary education on a dedicated campus in northern Bucharest.

== Curriculum and languages ==
BSB follows the National Curriculum for England and prepares students for IGCSE and A-Level examinations. Modern foreign languages taught include French, Spanish, German and Mandarin.

== Accreditation and affiliations ==
The British School of Bucharest is recognised as a British School Overseas and is inspected by the UK Independent Schools Inspectorate (ISI). ISI inspections in 2018, 2022 and 2025 each judged the school "Excellent" in pupils' learning and achievement and in their personal development, the highest outcome under the British Schools Overseas framework. The school is a member of the Council of British International Schools (COBIS), the Association of British Schools Overseas (AoBSO) and the American Chamber of Commerce in Romania (AmCham).

== Notable initiatives ==
The school highlights its Innovation Hub as an extension of Design and Technology, supporting projects across science, technology, engineering, arts and mathematics (STEAM). Projects include Project Zephyr, an electric-vehicle build programme, which has been featured in education and local media.
