= Voluntari =

- Town
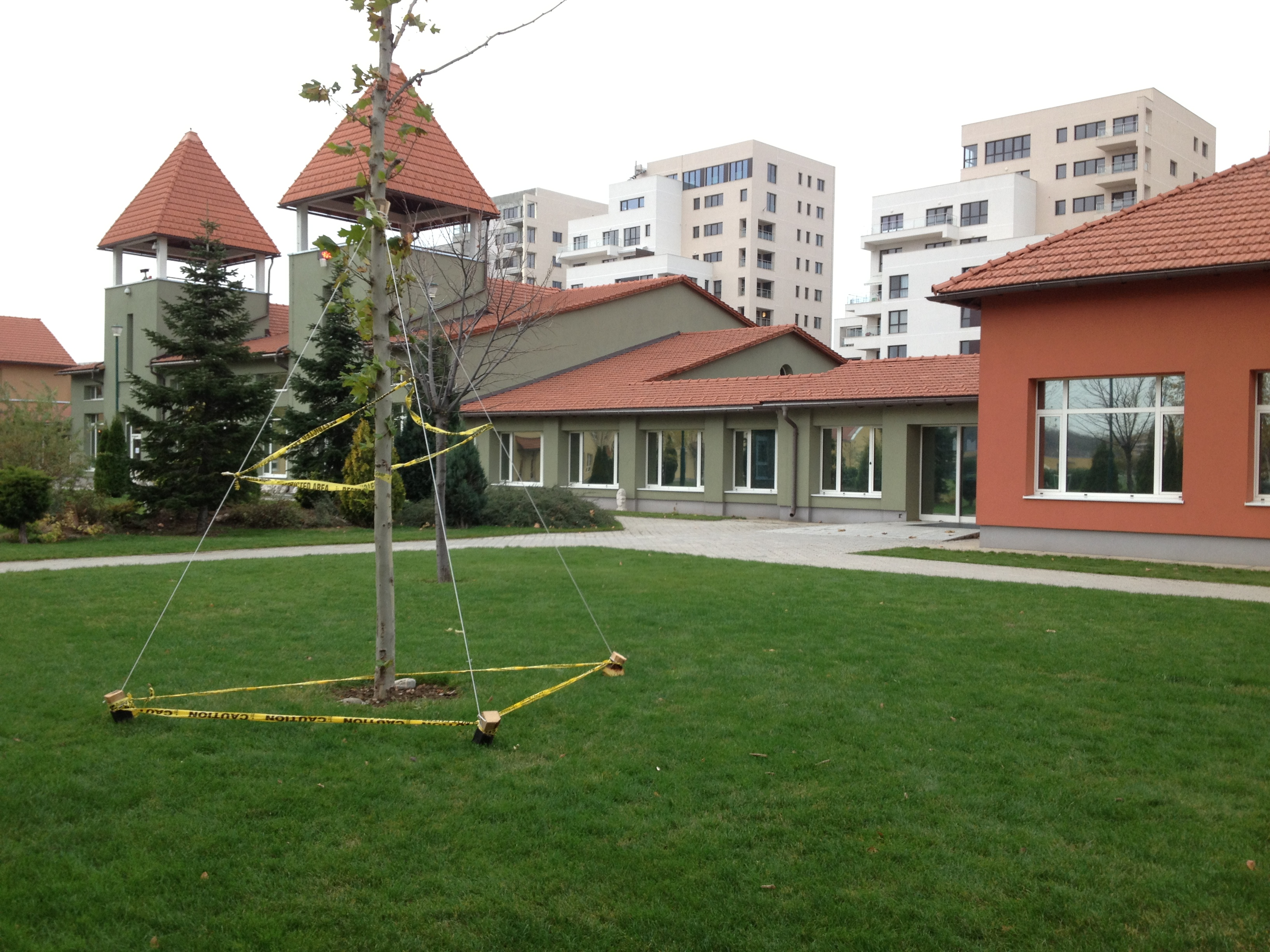
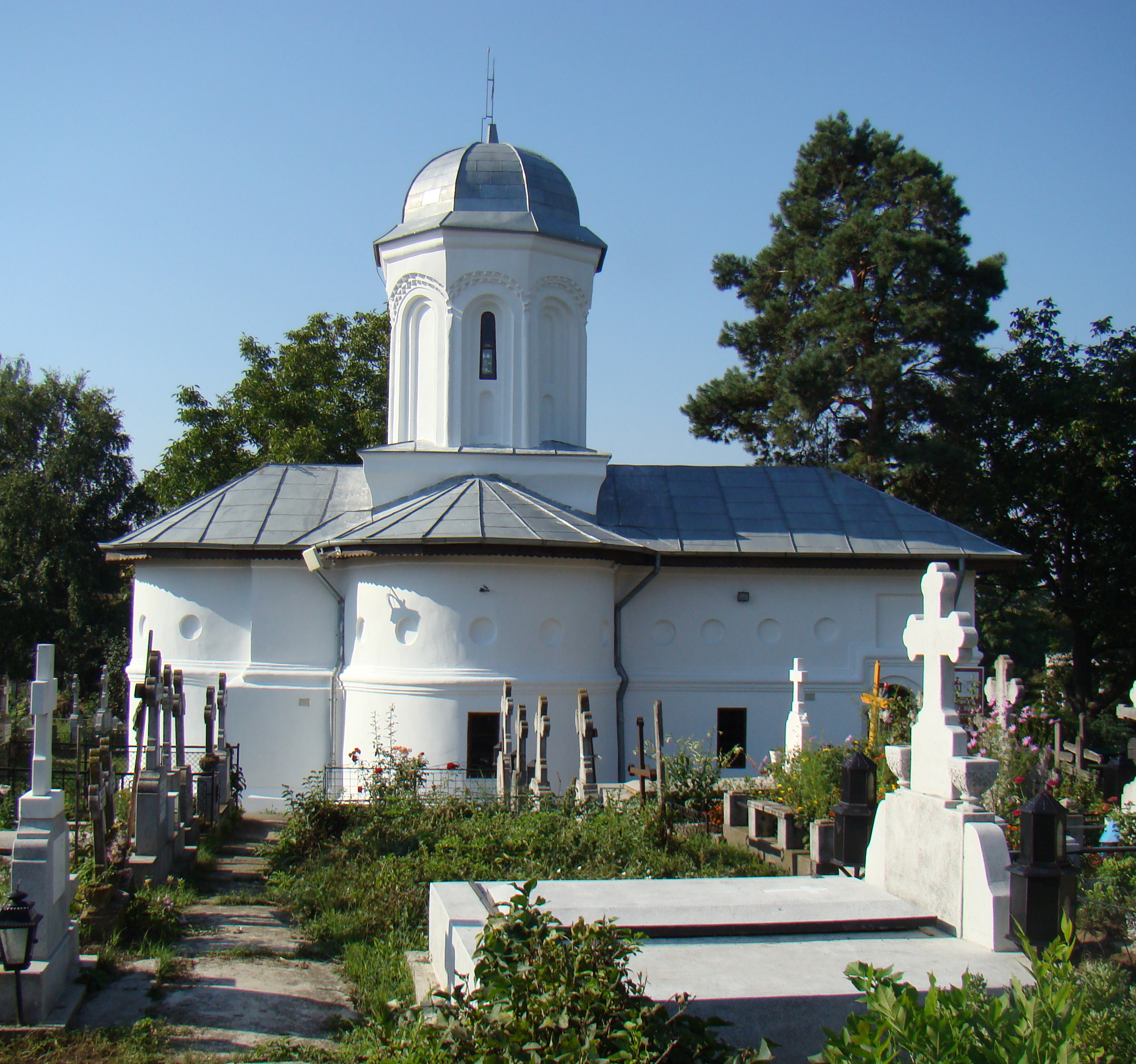
- American International School of Bucharest Saint Elijah Pipera-Tătăranu Church

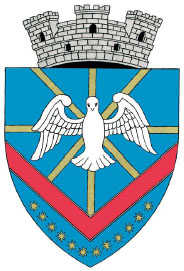
- Coat of arms

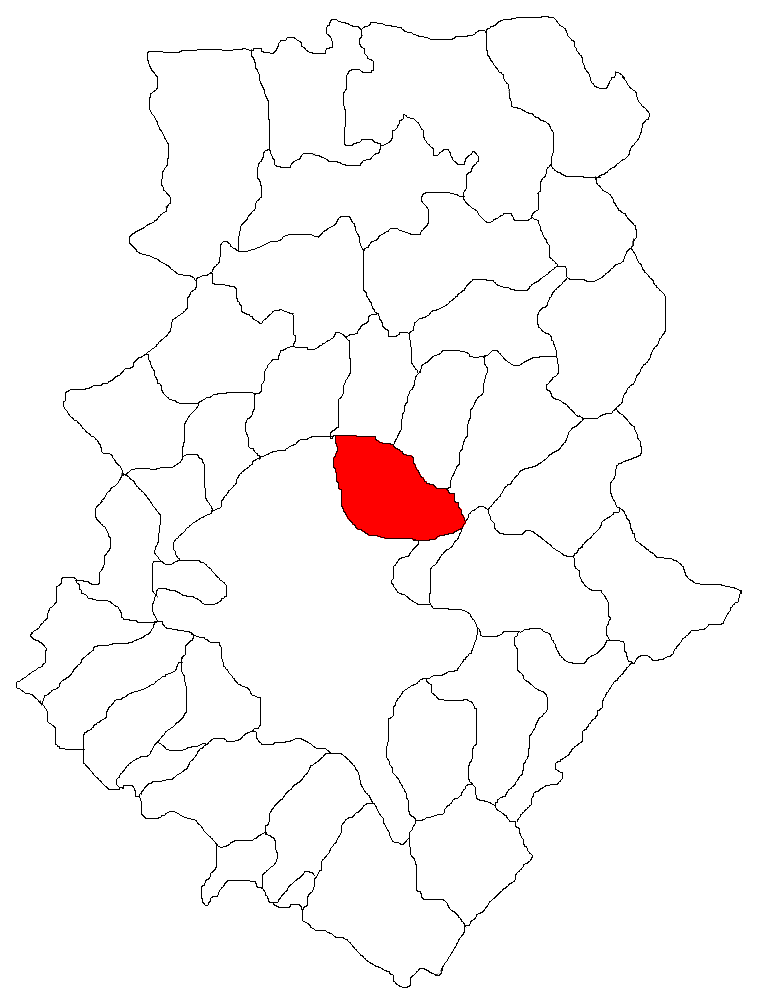
- Location in Ilfov County

- Location in Romania
- Coordinates: 44°29′33″N 26°11′29″E
- Country: Romania
- County: Ilfov

Government
  - Mayor (2024–2028): Florentin-Costel Pandele (PSD)
- Area: 37.4 km^{2} (14.4 sq mi)
- Population (2021-12-01): 47,366
  - Density: 1,270/km^{2} (3,280/sq mi)
- Time zone: UTC+02:00 (EET)
  - Summer (DST): UTC+03:00 (EEST)
- Postal code: 077190
- Area code: (+40) 02 1
- Vehicle reg.: IF
- Website: www.primaria-voluntari.ro

Voluntari (Romanian pronunciation: [volunˈtarʲ]) is a town in Ilfov County, Muntenia, Romania. It is located at a distance of 1 km from the northern border of Bucharest (on the DN2 road towards Urziceni) and is thus frequently viewed as a suburb of Bucharest.

The population is 47,366 inhabitants according to the 1 December 2021 census, with an ethnic composition, among those for whom data are available, of 94.8% Romanians, 1.3% Romani, 0.9% Chinese, 0.5% Turks, and 2.5% of other ethnic groups.

The low price of land, the proximity to Bucharest, and the easy and reliable access to both the railway network and the road network have allowed a steady development of industrial and commercial facilities, especially in the light industry and import/export commerce. The town's output estimate increased by over 25% between 2001 and 2005. Even with such high development rates, many residents commute to Bucharest. Voluntari is the site of a shopping centre known as Jolie Ville Galleria, as well as the headquarters of the Vodafone Romania company.

Voluntari literally means "Volunteers", in Romanian, having been founded by the volunteer soldiers who fought for Romania in World War I and were given plots to build their homes there after the war. The settlement received city status in 2004.

== Local government ==
The Voluntari Local Council (Consiliul Local Voluntari) has 19 councillors. It currently has the following party composition:

Party	Seats in 2008	Current Council
Social Democratic Party	17	
Democratic Liberal Party	2	

== Transport ==
Voluntari has its own bus network, operated by the local council, consisting of five bus routes: 1, 2, 153, 155 and 167. Additionally, the city is connected to Bucharest by bus routes run by STB, Bucharest's public transport operator.

== Sport ==
- FC Voluntari – football club

== Education ==
Voluntari is the site of the American International School of Bucharest, the British School of Bucharest and the Japanese School in Bucharest.

== Natives ==
- Anișoara Matei (born 1951), sports shooter
- Iuliana Munteanu (born 1955), rower

== See also ==
- Pipera
