= GEMS Wellington International School =

Private school in Dubai, United Arab Emirates

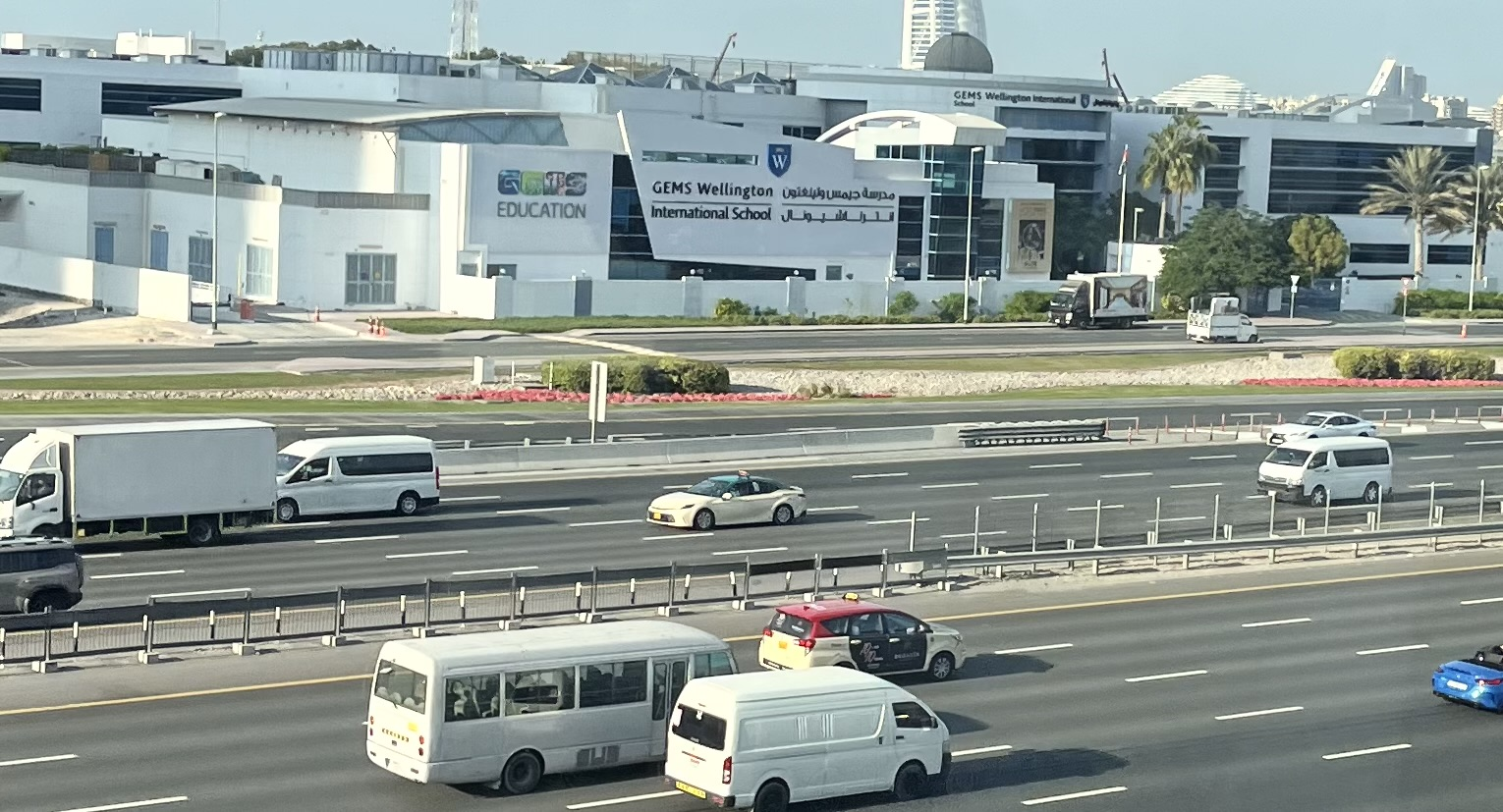

Location
- Al Sufouh; Dubai; United Arab Emirates
- Coordinates: 25°06′43″N 55°11′02″E

Information
- School type: Private Independent school
- Motto: النجاح للجميع كمتعلمين مدى الحياة (Success for all as lifelong learners)
- Patron saint: Prince Michael of Kent
- Established: 2005
- Founder: Sunny Varkey
- Status: Open
- Sister school: Gems Wellington Academy, Al Khail · Gems Wellington Academy, Silicon Oasis
- Authority: KHDA
- Principal: Andrew Jenkins
- Staff: 300
- Years offered: FS-1 - 13
- Gender: Co-educational
- Enrollment: 2000
- Sixth form students: 200
- Education system: British National Curriculum and International Baccalaureate
- Campus: Gems Wellington International School
- Campus type: Urban
- Houses: Emerald, Ruby, Onyx and Diamond
- Colour
- Athletics: Yes
- Sports: Yes
- Mascot: Wildcats
- Nickname: WIS
- Team name: WIS Wildcats
- USNWR ranking: Outstanding
- Newspaper: The Wellington Weekly
- Key products: WIS Merchandise
- School fees: AED 46,000 - 101,000
- Website: www.wellingtoninternationalschool.com

GEMS Wellington International School (Arabic: مدرسة جیمس ولینغتون انترناسیونال) is a private school situated in the Al Sufouh area of Dubai in the United Arab Emirates. The school has over 3000 students enrolled over all age groups. GEMS Wellington International School is a registered international school from FS-1 to Year 13. The school is part of the GEMS group of schools, an international school business.

== Curriculum ==
Wellington International School follows the British curriculum and IB curriculum. The school offers iGCSEs, GCSEs and the International Baccalaureate programme for Years 12 and 13, and will begin to offer the A-level pathway to Year 12 students starting from the 2025-2026 Academic Year.

== Academics ==
In 2024, the school saw 26% of students receive a Grade 9 in their iGCSEs and GCSEs, with 81% scoring a Grades 6 to 9. In 2024, students in the IB Career-related programme had a 100% pass rate in the school. Alumna of the school have gone on to study in Columbia University, Stanford, and other prestigious institutions.

== Extracurricular activities ==
Significant extracurricular activities participated in by Wellington International School include Model United Nations, the Duke of Edinburgh's Award, and charity work.

=== Charity Work ===
In 2024, the school produced a charity single, a cover of The Climb by American singer Miley Cyrus, which debuted at the top of UAE download and UK soundtrack charts on iTunes within hours of being released. The proceeds went to Harmony House, an orphanage in India. In 2023, students at the school started a non-profit organisation to aid migrant workers in the country.

== KHDA inspection report ==
The Knowledge and Human Development Authority (KHDA) is an educational quality assurance authority based in Dubai, United Arab Emirates. It undertakes early learning, school and higher learning institution management, and rates schools on Dubai based on their performance. Schools can achieve from Outstanding to Unsatisfactory. GEMS Wellington International has received an Outstanding rating since the 2009-2010 school year.

A summary of the inspection ratings for GEMS Wellington International School:

School Year	2017-2018	2016-2017	2015-2016	2014-2015	2013-2014	2012-2013	2011-2012	2010-2011	2009-2010	Curriculum
Rating	Outstanding	Outstanding	Outstanding	Outstanding	Outstanding	Outstanding	Outstanding	Outstanding	Outstanding	UK

== Notable alumni ==
- Tyrese Johnson-Fisher, American football player
