= Daniel Harper (headmaster) =

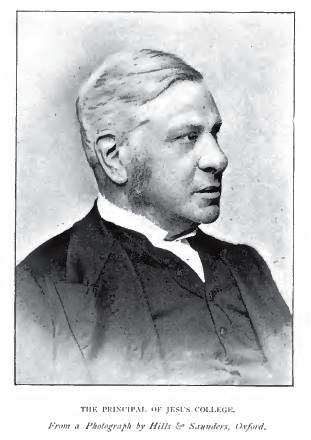
Hugo Harper

Hugo Daniel Harper (3 May 1821 – 8 January 1895) was Principal of Jesus College, Oxford, from 1877 to 1895.

== Early life and education ==
Harper was born at Langwick, Glamorgan on 3 May 1821. He went to school at Christ's Hospital and was first admitted as a sizar at St John's College, Cambridge on 25 May 1840 but less than a month later transferred to Jesus College, Oxford, where he was awarded a scholarship and obtained a second in classical moderations, followed by a first in mathematics in 1844. He was a Fellow of Jesus College, Oxford from 1845 to 1852.

== Career ==
He was headmaster of Cowbridge Grammar School (1847–50) and Sherborne School (1851–77). He served as Chairman of the Conference of Headmasters.

He was ordained Deacon at Christ Church Cathedral on 18 May 1845, and Priest at Salisbury Cathedral on 23 December 1855.

Harper married at All Saints' Church, Knightsbridge on 19 December 1850 Mary Charlotte Harness, the elder daughter of Henry Drury Harness. Their seven children were all born in Sherborne. Among their children was Mary Harper, who married in 1886 Dr. Ernest Stewart Roberts, later Master of Gonville and Caius College, Cambridge.

He served as Prebendary of Salisbury from 1871 to 1882.

In 1877 he was elected Principal of Jesus College, Oxford. During his time as Principal, he was heavily engaged in disputes about proposed new statutes for the college that were considered by their opponents to have an adverse effect on the links between the college and Wales.

From 1878 to 1882 he was Rector of Clynnog Fawr in Caernarfonshire, and from 1882 to 1893 Vicar of Besselsleigh in Berkshire.

Around the beginning of 1893 he became too ill to continue as Principal of Jesus College, and was relieved of his duties by the Visitor. He went to live at The Grove, Impington, Cambridgeshire and died there two years later on 8 January 1895. He was buried in Holywell Cemetery, Oxford in the grave of his son William Jevon Harper, who had died at the age of 17.
