= Dance FM =

Radio station in Bucharest, Romania

- Industry: Mass media
- Founded: 21 February 2011
- Headquarters: Bucharest, Romania
- Area served: Bucharest, Romania
- Services: Radio broadcasting
- Owner: RCS & RDS
- Website: www.dancefm.ro

Jingle used by Dance FM.

Dance FM is a clubbing radio station from Romania, broadcasting dance music, owned by RCS & RDS. It broadcasts on 89.5 FM in Bucharest and on the internet. It was officially released on 21 February 2011 at an event organised by The Mission.

On 18 June 2011, Dance FM organised an event, where Tiesto mixed music for more than 3,000 people at the Arenele Romane (ro) in Bucharest.

== Frequencies ==
City	Frequences
Bucharest	89.5
Cluj-Napoca	103
Târgu Mureș	100
Online	dancefm.ro FM

== Schedule ==
	MONDAY	TUESDAY	WEDNESDAY	THURSDAY	FRIDAY	SATURDAY	SUNDAY
00:00	Defected Radio Show	Clapcast by Claptone	Music From Space by Marc Romboy	Dance FM Non Stop Hits	Dance FM Hits	Kondo Beach 118BPM by Derek D	Hed Kandi
01:00	Made in Ibiza by Jose Maria Ramon	Emotional	Hot Robot Radio by Jamie Jones	Dance FM Non Stop Hits	Dance FM Hits	Circoloco Radio Show	Spectrum Radio by Jorin Voorn
02:00	Alb Who	Last night on Earth by Sasha	Gruuv's going on by Gruuv Element's	Dance FM Non Stop Hits	Dance FM Hits	Meduza	Vibrationz by Paul Damixie
03:00	Release yourself by Roger Sanchez	A state of trance by Armin Van Buuren	Underground Movement by Gully	Dance FM Non Stop Hits	Dance FM Hits	Stereo Productions Podcast by Chus & Ceballos	Mircea Ivan
04:00	Dance FM Hits	Dance FM Hits	Dance FM Hits	Dance FM Hits	Dance FM Hits	Dance FM Hits	Dance FM Hits
7:00	Get up and dance by Marius Onuc & Gabriel M	Get up and dance by Marius Onuc & Gabriel M	Get up and dance by Marius Onuc & Gabriel M	Get up and dance by Marius Onuc & Gabriel M	Get up and dance by Marius Onuc & Gabriel M	Dance FM Hits	Dance FM Hits
12:00	Dance FM Hits	Dance FM Hits	Dance FM Hits	Dance FM Hits	Dance FM Top 20 by Marius Onuc	Dance FM Hits	Dance FM Hits
14:00	Dance FM Non Stop Hits	Dance FM Non Stop HITS	Dance FM Non Stop Hits	Dance FM Non Stop Hits	Dance FM Non Stop Hits	Dance FM Non Stop Hits	Dance FM Non Stop Hits
21:00	Lucian Base	Anonymous Showcase	Selectro by Marika	Clubmix ONAIR by DJ Almud	Miki Love	Marius Onus	C. Păduraru
22:00	We Love Progressive by Alex & Mircea Babescu	DJ Kobin	Selectro by Marika	We are Creation by Alexandru Aprodu	Santino	Mircea Ivan	Virgil Baptista
23:00	NOTSOCOMMONDJ	Therapy by Audiopulse	Selectro by Marika	NUSHA/Never Over	DJ Paul	Trippin' Grooves by Cristian Kruger	DJ Kriss
