= List of Old Marlburians =

Alumni of Marlbrough College

The following is a list of notable Old Marlburians, former pupils of Marlborough College, Wiltshire, England or Marlborough College Malaysia, Iskandar Puteri, Malaysia.

== Academia and education ==
- Andrew Boggis, Master in College at Eton and chairman of the Headmasters' and Headmistresses' Conference, 2006
- Charles Fisher, Headmaster, Geelong Church of England Grammar School, Australia
- Peter Lamarque, philosopher
- John Raven, classical scholar and botanist
- Henry Wace, Principal of King's College London (1883–1897), former Dean of Canterbury

== Arts ==
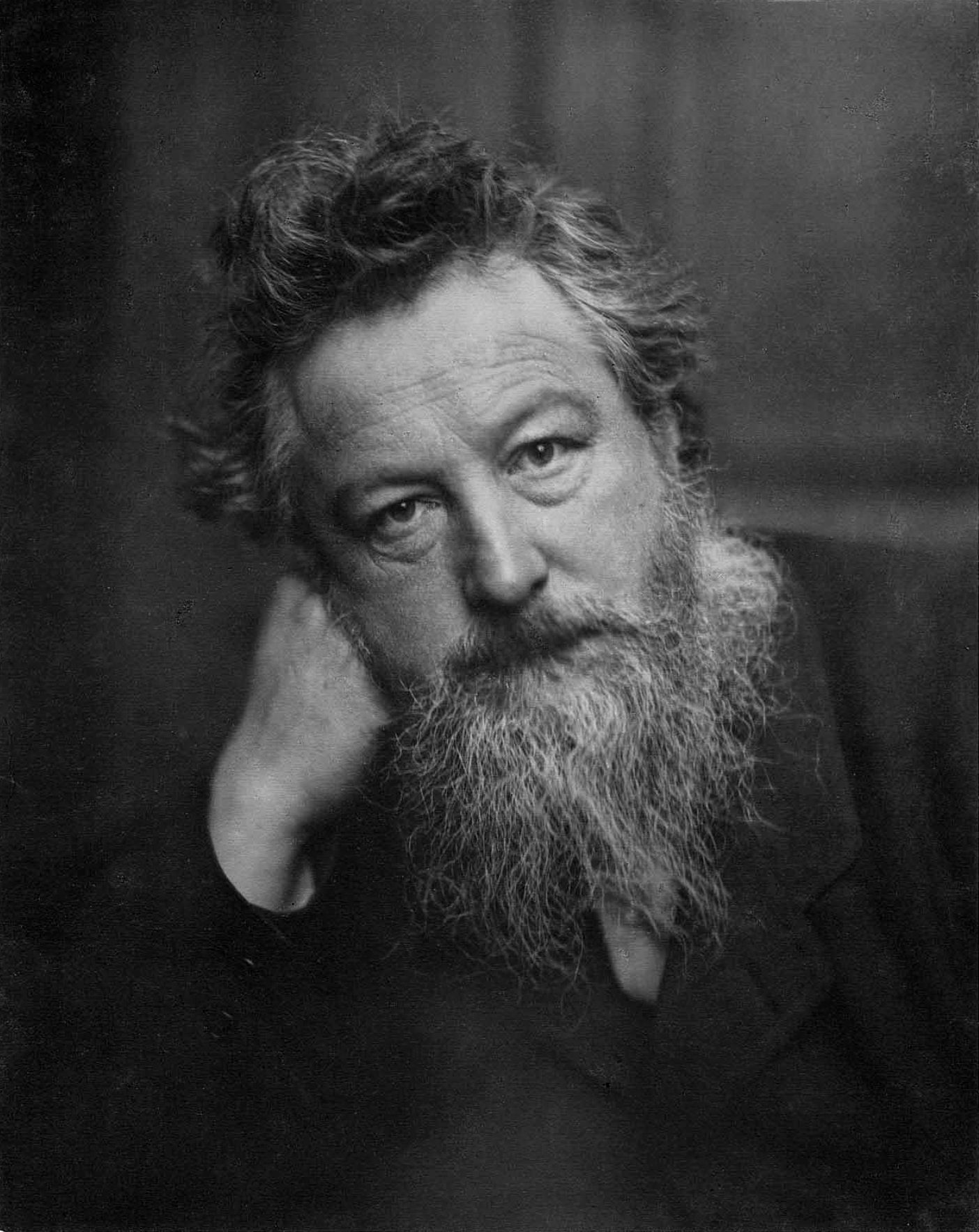
William Morris, textile designer, novelist, and socialist activist

- Anthony Blunt, art historian and communist spy
- Wilfrid Jasper Walter Blunt, writer and art teacher
- Lauren Child, writer and illustrator
- Claude Ferrier, architect
- Susannah Fiennes, artist
- Keith Henderson, artist
- William Morris, artist and writer
- Pontine Paus, designer, shipping heiress, and socialite
- Charles Saumarez Smith, art historian, former Director of the National Gallery
- Graham Shepard, cartoonist and illustrator
- Ellis Waterhouse, art historian

== Literature ==
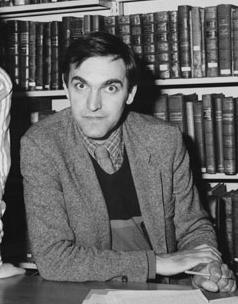
Ben Pimlott, academic and biographer

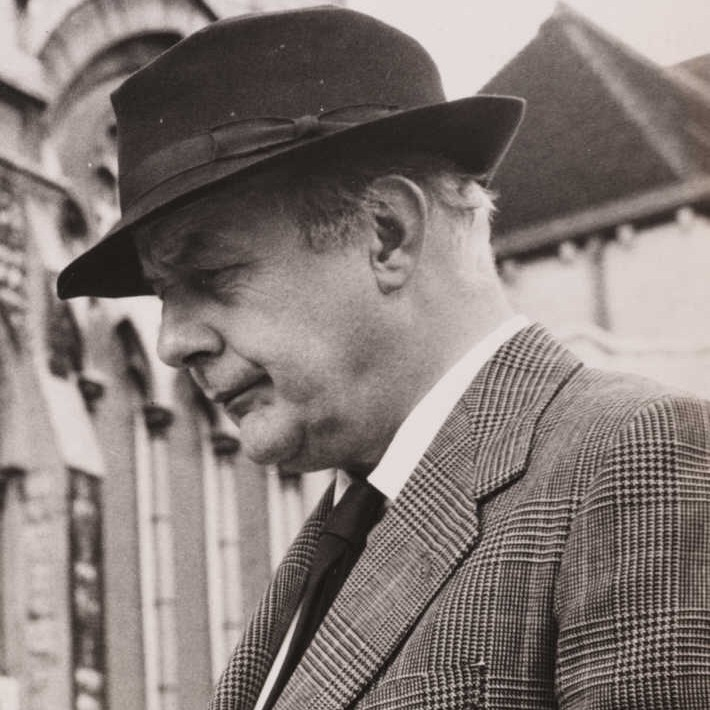
John Betjeman, Poet Laureate

- E. F. Benson, novelist
- John Betjeman, poet
- Humphrey Carpenter, biographer and broadcaster
- Bruce Chatwin, novelist and travel writer
- Cressida Cowell, ex-Children Laureate and creator of How to Train Your Dragon.
- J. Meade Falkner, author of Moonfleet and armaments manufacturer
- Anthony Hope, writer
- Arthur Lewis Jenkins, poet
- Dick King-Smith, writer
- Louis MacNeice, poet
- James Michie, poet and translator
- John Beverley Nichols, writer
- David Nobbs, comedy writer (Reginald Perrin)
- Redmond O'Hanlon, travel writer
- Ben Pimlott, biographer
- John Preston, journalist and novelist
- James Runcie, novelist and television producer
- Siegfried Sassoon, poet
- Charles Sorley, poet
- Bernard Spencer, poet
- Adam Thorpe, poet, novelist, and playwright
- R. J. Yeatman, co-author of 1066 and All That

== Music ==
- Toby Smith, keyboardist of Jamiroquai
- Bo Bruce, singer-songwriter
- Chris de Burgh, singer-songwriter
- Nick Drake, singer-songwriter
- Anthony Inglis, conductor
- Crispian Steele-Perkins, classical trumpeter
- David Mahoney, conductor, producer and creative director
- Fred Again, producer and composer

== Theatre, cinema and television ==
- Robert Addie, actor
- Bill Bankes-Jones Theatre and Opera Director
- Stephen Barry, director and administrator
- John Wingett Davies, film exhibitor
- Guy du Maurier, dramatist and soldier
- Michael Elwyn, actor
- Charles Furneaux, producer
- Colin Gordon, actor
- Wilfrid Hyde-White, actor
- Harry Brodribb Irving, actor
- Laurence Sydney Brodribb Irving, actor and dramatist
- Damian Jones, producer
- James Robertson Justice, actor
- James Mason, actor
- Simon McBurney, actor, writer and director
- Michael Pennington, actor and director
- Clive Robertson, actor
- Antony Root, television executive and producer
- William Desmond Taylor, director
- Ernest Thesiger, actor
- Nicholas Woodeson, actor
- Jack Whitehall, comedian, television writer/producer and actor
- Angus Wright, actor
- Emerald Fennell, actress, director and screenwriter
- Robert Watts, Hollywood film producer

== Politics ==
- Harriett Baldwin, MP for West Worcestershire
- Sally Bercow, wife of Speaker John Bercow
- Tim Boswell, MP for Daventry
- Stephen Bradley, former British Consul-General to Hong Kong
- Henry Brooke, Baron Brooke of Cumnor, Home Secretary
- Lord Brooke of Sutton Mandeville, Cabinet minister
- Rab Butler, statesman
- Samantha Cameron, wife of former Prime Minister David Cameron
- Christopher Chope, MP for Christchurch
- Otis Ferry, a hunt supporter and political activist, son of singer Bryan Ferry
- Diana Fox Carney, wife of Mark Carney, Prime Minister of Canada
- Alastair Goodlad, former MP for Eddisbury and High Commissioner to Australia
- Daniel Hannan, MEP for the South East of England
- Leonard Trelawny Hobhouse, British liberal politician and sociologist; one of the 'Fathers of Liberalism'
- William Jowitt, Lord Chancellor
- Peter Kirk, politician, first leader of the British delegation to the European Parliament
- George Butler Lloyd, MP for Shrewsbury (1913–1922)
- Mark Malloch Brown, Minister of State at the Foreign and Commonwealth Office
- John Maples, MP for Stratford-upon-Avon
- Frances Osborne, ex-wife of Chancellor of the Exchequer George Osborne
- William Newton Dunn, Conservative, and later Liberal Democrat, MEP for the East Midlands.
- John Parker, MP for Romford
- Maurice Petherick, MP for Penryn & Falmouth
- Mark Reckless, MP for Rochester and Strood
- Malcolm Ian Sinclair, 20th Earl of Caithness, politician
- Hallam Tennyson, Lord Tennyson, statesman
- Dennis Forwood Vosper, MP for Runcorn
- Lord Wright of Richmond, diplomat; Permanent Under-Secretary of State, Foreign and Commonwealth Office
- Montague Yeats-Brown, diplomat; consul to Genoa and Boston

== Sciences and engineering ==
- J. Richard Batchelor, transplant immunologist
- C. V. Boys, experimental physicist
- Francis Camps, pathologist
- George Stuart Carter, zoologist
- Henry Hugh Clutton, surgeon
- Sir Charles Galton Darwin, physicist
- John Dolphin, inventor and engineer
- Sir Nigel Gresley, steam locomotive engineer
- Donald Lynden-Bell, astronomer
- Sir Peter Medawar, Nobel prize-winning biologist
- David Morley, child health pioneer
- Alex Moulton, engineer and inventor of the Moulton Bicycle
- Peter Dunn, paediatrician who improved the care of newborn babies
- Sir Hugh Pelham, cell biologist
- Philip Sheppard, geneticist and lepidopterist
- Percy Sladen, marine zoologist
- Edward Thompson, steam locomotive engineer
- Thomas Valintine, doctor and New Zealand public health administrator
- Bernard Waddy, epidemiologist
- E. F. Warburg, botanist
- John Zachary Young, physiologist

== Sport ==
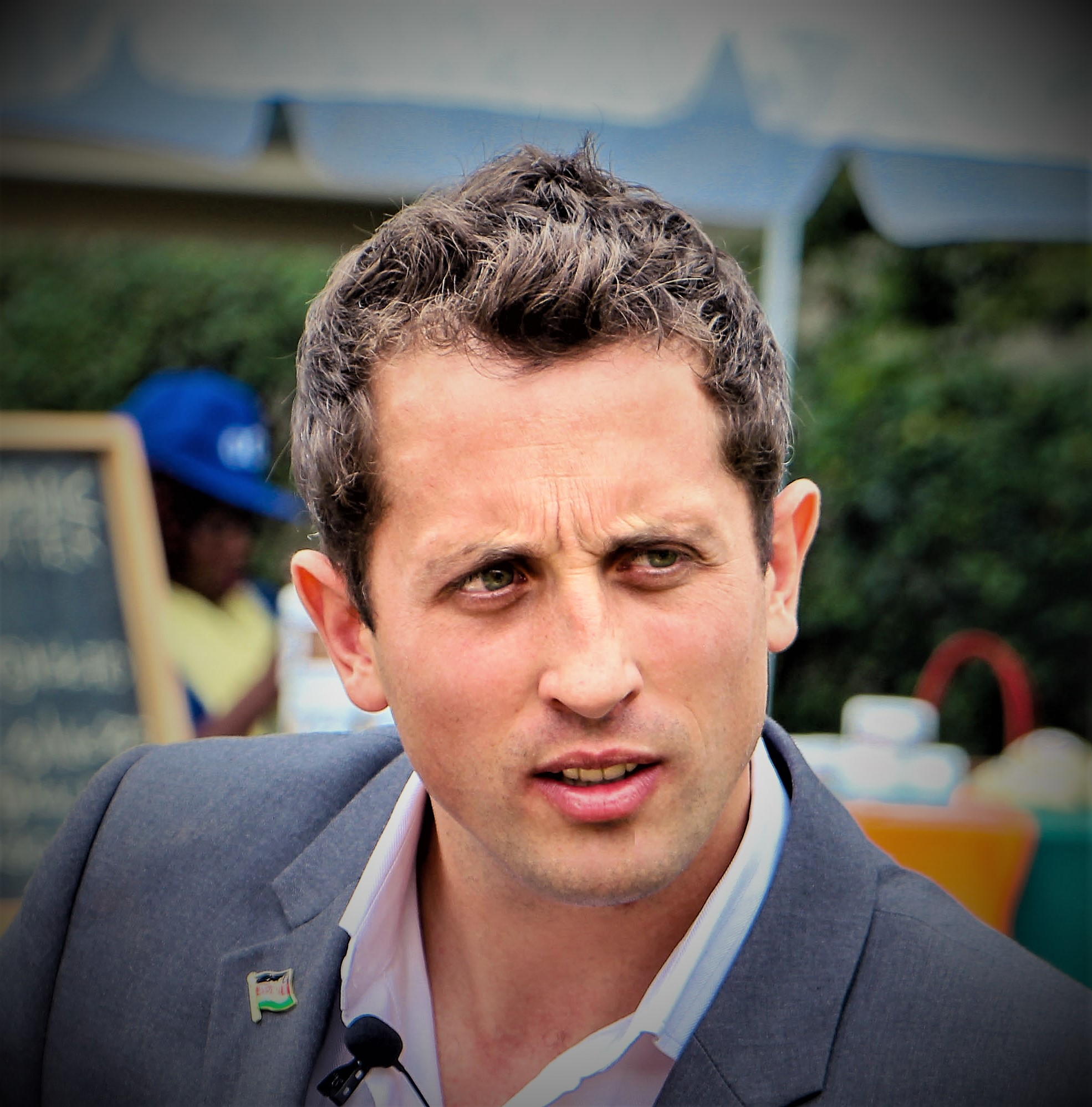
Competitive swimmer Jason Dunford

- George Ainsworth, first-class cricketer
- Robert Barker, played for England in the first international football match
- Fred Beart, cricketer
- Henry Bell, cricketer
- Sir Hugh Bomford, cricketer
- John Bowley, cricketer
- Walter Brooks, cricketer
- Richard Busk, cricketer
- Francis Chichester, round the world yachtsman
- William Crawley, cricketer
- Charles Dewé, cricketer
- Arthur Duthie, cricketer
- John Dolphin, cricketer
- Jason Dunford, swimmer
- Eric Elstob, cricketer
- Edward Fellowes, cricketer
- Arthur Fortescue, cricketer
- John Fuller, cricketer
- Henry Gale, cricketer
- Edward Garnier, cricketer
- Arthur Sumner Gibson, English rugby union player in the first international match in 1871
- Jamie Gibson, rugby union player
- Walter Greg (1851–1906), England rugby union international
- John Gunner, cricketer
- Alfred St. George Hamersley, English rugby union player in the first international match, later team captain
- Anthony Hill, cricketer
- Sir John Hoskyns, 15th Baronet, cricketer
- Edward Hume, cricketer
- John Hunt, leader of the first successful ascent of Mount Everest
- Hector Jelf, first-class cricketer
- Nigel Jerram, first-class cricketer
- Maurice Jewell, first-class cricketer
- Edward Kewley, 19th-century England Rugby captain
- Sir Henry King, first-class cricketer
- Robert Kingsford, England international footballer and FA Cup winner
- Frederic Hugh Lee (1855–1924), England rugby international (1876–77), Oxford rugby captain, and later Registrar of the Court of Arches
- William Lipscomb, cricketer
- John Lloyd, Welsh cricketer
- Reginald Lord, cricketer
- John Maples, cricketer
- Iain MacDonald-Smith, Olympic sailor, Gold medal Mexico (1968)
- Henry Maturin, Irish first-class cricketer
- Jake Meyer, mountaineer
- Michael Morgan, first-class cricketer
- John Morley, first-class cricketer
- Charles Morris, first-class cricketer
- Sydney Morse rugby union international who represented England (1873–1875)
- Peter Nelson, first-class cricketer and British Army officer
- Richard Page, first-class cricketer and British Army officer
- Inglewood Parkin, cricketer
- Charles Patteson, cricketer
- Edward Phillips, first-class cricketer
- Gerald Phillips, cricketer
- Mark Phillips, Olympic horseman and former husband of The Princess Royal
- Albert Porter, cricketer
- William Pulman, cricketer
- Francis Quinton, cricketer
- Nicholas Ross, cricketer
- John Scobell, cricketer
- Arthur Scott, cricketer
- Edward Shaw, cricketer
- Reggie Spooner, cricketer
- Allan Steel, cricketer
- Walter Thorburn, Scottish cricketer
- Mark Tomlinson, England International polo player
- Stirling Voules, cricketer
- Bernard Waddy, cricketer
- Charles Waller, cricketer
- Lancelot Ward, cricketer
- Ronald Watson, Scottish cricketer
- Charles Plumpton Wilson, England footballer
- Martin Winbolt-Lewis, Olympic athlete
- Andrew Wolfson, cricketer
- Sir John Wood, cricketer
- Kenneth Woodroffe, cricketer
- William Wright, cricketer

== Religion ==
- Cyril Alington, headmaster, and Dean of Durham
- Henry Bather, Archdeacon of Ludlow (1892–1904)
- Henry Bell, Canon of Carlisle
- Roy Henry Bowyer-Yin Canon and Chaplain of S Thomas College Mt Lavinia
- Alfred Blunt, Bishop of Bradford (1931–1955)
- Frederick Nicholas Charrington, social reformer and founder of the Tower Hamlets Mission
- Frederick Copleston, priest and philosopher
- Nigel Cornwall, Bishop of Borneo (1949–1962)
- Geoffrey Fisher, Archbishop of Canterbury
- Colin Fletcher, Bishop of Dorchester
- James Newcome, Bishop of Carlisle
- Edward Patey, Dean of Liverpool
- John Robinson, Bishop of Woolwich
- Mark Santer, Bishop of Birmingham (1987–2002)
- Hugh Richard Lawrie Sheppard, known as Dick Sheppard, vicar of St. Martin-in-the-Fields and founder of the Peace Pledge Union
- Arthur Winnington-Ingram, Bishop of London
- Edward Sydney Woods, Bishop of Lichfield (1937–1953)
- John Oliver Feetham, Bishop of North Queensland; recognized as a saint in the Anglican Church of Australia

== Journalism ==
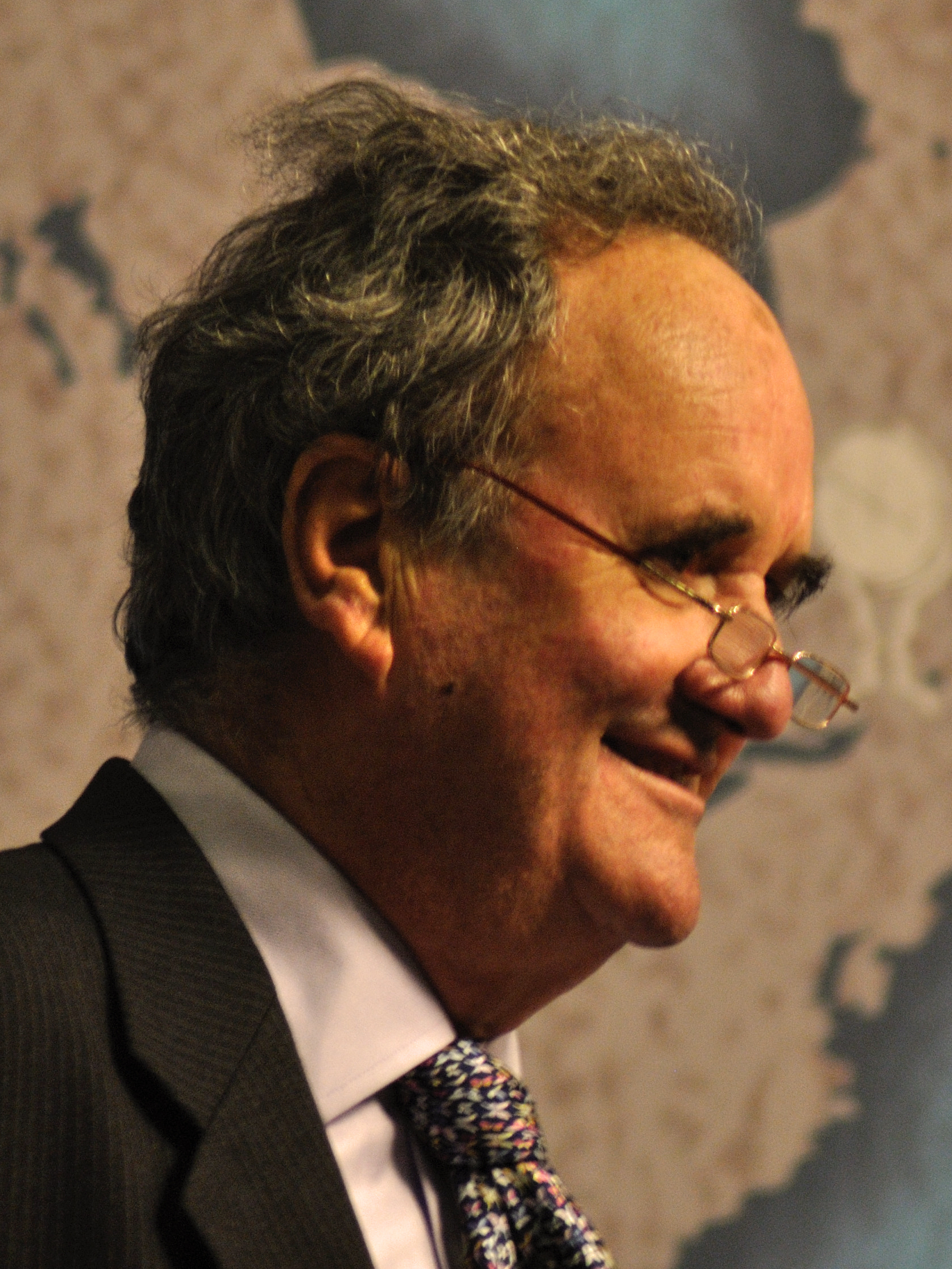
Mark Tully, BBC correspondent

- Rawdon Christie, English-born New Zealand television presenter
- Simon Fanshawe, writer and broadcaster
- Frank Gardner, BBC News Security Correspondent
- Richard Jebb, journalist
- Derrick Somerset Macnutt, crossword compiler under the pseudonym Ximenes
- Christopher Martin-Jenkins, BBC cricket correspondent
- James Mates, ITN newscaster
- Norris and Ross McWhirter, journalists, authors, and political activists
- Tom Newton Dunn, political editor of the Sun
- Edmund Penning-Rowsell, wine writer
- Julian Pettifer, ITV and BBC journalist
- Hugh Pym, ITN and BBC News journalist
- Emily Sheffield, Evening Standard editor, newspaper and magazine journalist
- Sir Mark Tully, BBC India correspondent and author
- T.C. Worsley, writer, editor, and television critic

== Armed forces ==
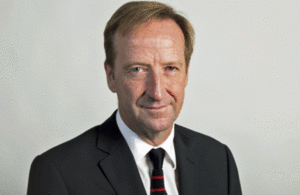
Alex Younger, Chief of the Secret Intelligence Service

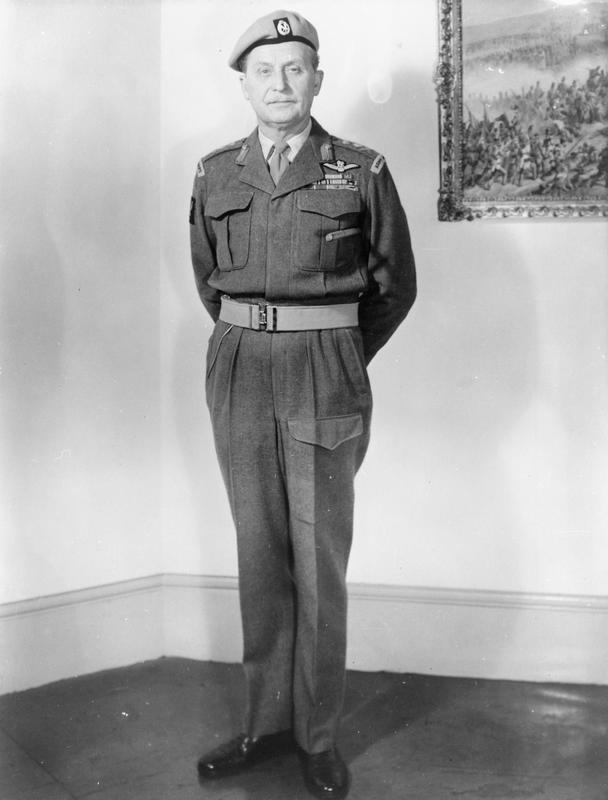
Hugh Stockwell, British Army Officer

- Nigel Anderson, soldier and local politician
- Lionel Ashfield, World War I flying ace, killed in action
- Phillip Scott Burge, World War I flying ace, killed in action
- Edward Bradford, soldier and Metropolitan Police Commissioner
- John Brigstocke, admiral, second sea lord, c-in-c Naval Home Command
- Michael Clapp senior Royal Navy officer who commanded the United Kingdom's amphibious assault group, Task Group 317.0, in the Falklands War
- Richard Corfield, officer in charge of the Somaliland Camel Constabulary
- Charles Elworthy, Chief of the Defence Staff and Governor of Windsor Castle
- Peter Gillett, Major-General, Deputy Constable and Lieutenant-Governor of Windsor Castle
- John 'Hoppy' Hopgood', pilot in 617 Squadron, killed on the Dambusters raid on 16 May 1943
- David Maltby, pilot in 617 Squadron who flew in the Dambusters raid
- John Kiszely, Lieutenant General and Director of the Defence Academy
- Ian Macfadyen, RAF officer and Lieutenant Governor of the Isle of Man (2000–2005)
- Charles MacGregor, General and head of intelligence for the British Indian Army
- Nevil Macready, General and Metropolitan Police Commissioner
- Patrick Palmer, Commander in Chief, Allied Forces Northern Europe and Governor of Windsor Castle
- Francis Quinton, British Army general (Royal Artillery)
- John Wilfred Stanier, Field Marshal
- Hugh Stockwell, General, Deputy Supreme Allied Commander Europe (1960–1964)
- Henry Hughes Wilson, Field Marshal
- Alex Younger, Chief of the Secret Intelligence Service

== Victoria Cross and George Cross holders ==
=== VC ===
Victoria Cross holders:

- Edward Kinder Bradbury
- Frederic Brooks Dugdale
- Charles Calveley Foss
- Reginald Clare Hart
- Raymond Harvey Lodge Joseph De Montmorency
- Llewelyn Alberic Emilius Price-Davies
- Lionel Ernest Queripel
- John Neil Randle
- Nowell Salmon
- Edward Talbot Thackeray
- Eric Charles Twelves Wilson
- Sir Henry Evelyn Wood
- Sidney Clayton Woodroffe

=== GC ===
George Cross holders:

- Arthur Frederick Crane Nicholls

== Commerce and industry ==
- Michael Clapham, industrialist (ICI)
- Ernest Debenham, department store owner
- Sir Nicholas Goodison, - Finance, reforms, arts, philanthropy
- Olivia Grosvenor, Duchess of Westminster, senior account manager
- Ambrose Heal, retailer
- Ian and Kevin Maxwell, former publishers and entrepreneurs
- Robert Noel, businessman, chief executive of Land Securities Group plc
- Rob Perrins, Managing Director of Berkeley Group Holdings
- George Duncan Rowe, stockbroker, co-founder of Rowe & Pitman
- Sir Francis Towle, hotelier
- Sir Michael Turner, General Manager (Chairman) of HSBC (1953–1962)
- Piers Wedgwood, 4th Baron Wedgwood, army officer and international ambassador for the Wedgwood Group
- Simon Woodroffe, founder of the Yo Sushi restaurant chain

== The Royal Family and the Court ==
- Princess Eugenie of York, younger daughter of Andrew Mountbatten-Windsor
- Catherine, Princess of Wales (née Catherine Middleton), wife of William, Prince of Wales
- Pippa Middleton, sister and Maid of Honour to the Princess of Wales
- Robin Janvrin, courtier, Private Secretary to Queen Elizabeth II
- Alan 'Tommy' Lascelles, courtier, Private Secretary to George VI and Elizabeth II, and cousin to the husband of Mary, Princess Royal
- Nigel Bridge, Baron Bridge of Harwich, Law Lord
- John Brightman, Baron Brightman, Law Lord
- Thomas William Cain, First Deemster of the Isle of Man
- Rayner Goddard, Lord Chief Justice
- Sir Philip Margetson, Assistant Commissioner of Police of the Metropolis
- William Moore, Lord Chief Justice of Northern Ireland
- T. C. Kingsmill Moore, Irish judge, politician, and author
- Sir Walter George Salis Schwabe, Chief Justice of the Madras High Court
- Sir Richard Gaskell, President of the Law Society of England and Wales
- Tunku Ali Redhauddin ibni Tuanku Muhriz, member of the Negeri Sembilan royal family, who is the Tunku Besar of Seri Menanti, an Honorary Bencher of the Inner Temple, President of WWF Malaysia, and the Chairman of Marlborough College Malaysia.

== Fashion ==
- Amanda Harlech, model and 'muse' to John Galliano
- Stella Tennant, model and fashion designer
- Samantha Cameron, wife of former Prime Minister David Cameron and creative director at Smythson

== Other professions ==
Tracy Philipps, intelligence officer and conservationist

- Sir Basil Blackett, civil servant and international finance expert
- Sir Hugh Bomford, civil servant in the Indian Civil Service
- Frederic Bonney, anthropologist and photographer
- Sir Grahame Clark, archaeologist
- O. G. S. Crawford, archaeologist
- Richard Dale, economist
- Stewart Donald, businessman and football club chairman
- Henry Everard, railway executive and acting President of Rhodesia
- Ian Fraser, Baron Fraser of Lonsdale, promoter of the interests of blind people
- Wilfred Grenfell, medical missionary and social reformer
- Gordon Hamilton-Fairley, oncologist and IRA victim
- Jason James, director and expert on UK/Japan relations
- Sir Edmund Ronald Leach, anthropologist
- Derrick Somerset Macnutt, Ximenes, cryptic crossword compiler for The Observer
- Ghislaine Maxwell, socialite, owner of the TerraMar Project, and convicted child sex trafficker
- Tunku 'Abidin Muhriz, Founding President of Institute of Democracy and Economic Affairs (IDEAS), Malaysia
- Tracy Philipps, colonial administrator, intelligence officer, and conservationist, Secretary-General of International Union for the Conservation of Nature and Natural Resources
- Edward John Hugh Tollemache, private firm banker
- David Treffry, colonial servant, international financier, and High Sheriff of Cornwall
- Prince Waranonthawat, Thai prince, grandson of King Chulalongkorn
- Gordon Welchman, code-breaker
- John Wood, civil servant in the Indian Civil Service

== Bibliography ==
- A History of Marlborough College During Fifty Years from its Foundation to the Present Time by A.G. Bradley, A.C. Champneys and J.W. Baines (Macmillan & Co., 1893)
- Marlborough College Register from 1843 to 1904 Inclusive by Marlborough College (Oxford: Horace Hart, 1905).
- Paths of Progress: a history of Marlborough College by Thomas Hinde (John Catt, 1992) ISBN 0-907383-33-5
- Marlborough College – official site
