= Robert Kingsford =

English footballer

Personal information
- Full name: Robert Kennett Kingsford
- Date of birth: 23 December 1849
- Place of birth: Sydenham Hill, England
- Date of death: 14 October 1895 (aged 45)
- Place of death: Saint Peter Port, Guernsey
- Position: Forward

Senior career*
Years	Team	Apps	(Gls)
- Old Marlburians
1872–1875	Wanderers	18	(10)
1869–1875	Crystal Palace	20	(10)

International career
1874	England	1	(1)
- * Club domestic league appearances and goals

Robert Kennett Kingsford (23 December 1849 – 14 October 1895) was an English footballer who made one appearance for England in 1874, and was a member of the Wanderers team that won the 1873 FA Cup Final.

== Career ==
Kingsford was born in Sydenham and was educated at Marlborough College, where he played football for the college. After leaving college, he played for the Old Marlburians and the Wanderers, winning the FA Cup with the Wanderers in 1873. In the final, played at Lillie Bridge on 29 March 1873, the Wanderers defeated Oxford University 2–0.

He made his solitary England appearance on 7 March 1874 against Scotland, playing as an outside forward. After "a most competitive game", Scotland won 2–1, with Kingsford scoring England's opening goal in the 22nd minute, before the Scots scored twice.

On 31 October 1874, Kingsford scored five in a game against Farningham.

Kingsford also played for Crystal Palace and represented Surrey at football, and took over from Charles Alcock as secretary to the Wanderers in 1874.

He was also a useful cricketer, and played three first-class matches for Surrey as a wicket-keeper.

He studied law, and emigrated to live in Adelaide, Australia. On 14 October 1895 aged 45, Kennett died in Guernsey, where his wife came from.

== Honours ==
Wanderers

- FA Cup: winners 1873

== International goals ==
Scores and results list England's goal tally first.

#	Date	Venue	Opponent	Score	Result	Competition
1	7 March 1874	Hamilton Crescent, Partick	Scotland	1–0	1–2	Friendly
