= Roger Ellis =

Roger Ellis may refer to:

- Roger Ellis (American football)
- Roger Ellis (schoolmaster)
