= John Dancy =

John Dancy may refer to:

- John Christopher Dancy, English headmaster
- John C. Dancy, politician, journalist, and educator in North Carolina and Washington, DC.
