= Ledger Hill =

English cricketer (1871–1950)

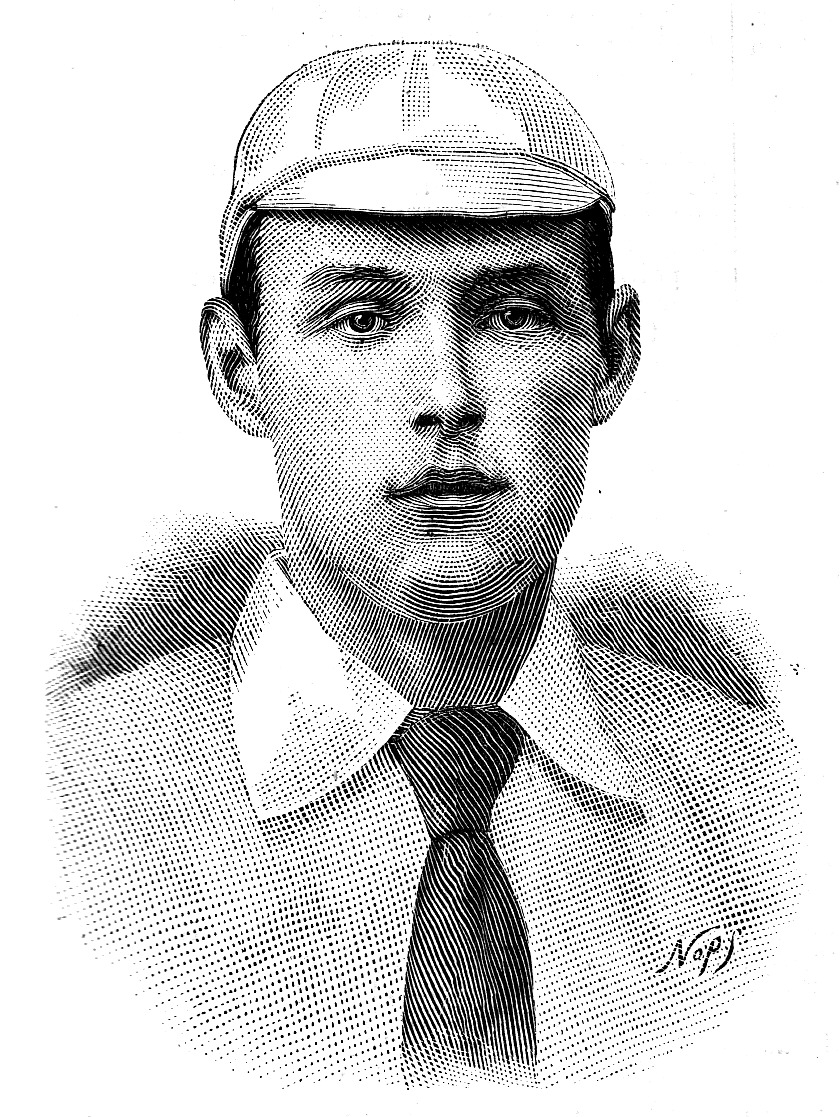
- A drawing of Hill in Cricket: A Weekly Record of the Game (1892)

Personal information
- Full name: Arthur James Ledger Hill
- Born: 26 July 1871; Bassett, Hampshire, England
- Died: 6 September 1950 (aged 79); Romsey, Hampshire, England
- Batting: Right-handed
- Bowling: Right-arm roundarm-fast Right-arm underarm-fast
- Relatives: Anthony Hill (son); Richard Page (nephew)

International information
- National side: England (1896)
- Test debut (cap 98): 13 February 1896 v South Africa
- Last Test: 21 March 1896 v South Africa

Domestic team information
- Years: Team
- 1890–1893: Cambridge University
- 1890–1911/12: Marylebone Cricket Club
- 1895–1921: Hampshire

Career statistics
Competition	Test	First-class
Matches	3	221
Runs scored	251	10,353
Batting average	62.75	27.98
100s/50s	1/1	19/44
Top score	124	199
Balls bowled	40	16,918
Wickets	4	305
Bowling average	2.00	27.99
5 wickets in innings	0	4
10 wickets in match	0	1
Best bowling	4/8	7/36
Catches/stumpings	1/–	143/–
- Source: Cricinfo, 6 November 2022

Arthur James Ledger Hill (26 July 1871 – 6 September 1950) was an English cricketer and played Test cricket for England in 1896. In first-class cricket, he began his career playing for Cambridge University while studying at Jesus College, Cambridge. He would play the majority of his first-class cricket for Hampshire, for whom he made 161 appearances between 1895 and 1921. Early in his career, Hill was a "useful fast bowler" and would take 305 first-class wickets during his career, the majority of which came prior to 1900. As a batsman, he scored over 10,000 runs in first-class cricket, recording nineteen centuries. He was notable for scoring the first-ever first-class century in India, which he made touring with Lord Hawke's XI in January 1893. His sporting endeavours also extended to rugby union and field hockey, with him representing Hampshire in both.

== Early life and Oxford cricket ==
The son of James Ledger Hill, he was born in July 1871 at Bassett, Hampshire. He was educated at Marlborough College, playing cricket, rugby, and racquets for the college. At Marlborough, he was coached in cricket by Joseph Potter. From there, he matriculated to Jesus College, Cambridge. While studying at Cambridge, Hill made his debut in first-class cricket for Cambridge University against C. I. Thornton's XI at Fenner's in 1890. He was a regular feature in the Cambridge eleven until 1893, making 34 appearances for Cambridge and gaining a blue in each of those seasons for his participation in The University Match against Oxford at Lord's. For Cambridge, he scored 975 runs an average of 17.90, with a highest score of 75, one of four half centuries he made for Cambridge. With his right-arm fast bowling, he took 66 wickets at a bowling average of 23.78, with best figures of 4 for 23.

During Hill's studies at Cambridge, he also made a number of first-class appearances for other teams. He made his first appearance for the Gentlemen in the Gentlemen v Players fixture of 1891 at Hastings, and later toured British India and Ceylon with Lord Hawke's XI, making four first-class appearances. Hill made history on this tour, scoring the maiden first-class century in Indian domestic cricket when he made 132 against All-India at Allahabad; he had been dropped on zero at the beginning of his innings. Hill had success in the first-class part of the tour with the bat, scoring 212 runs at an average of 35.33. With the ball, he took 16 wickets at an average of 12.18, including his maiden five wicket haul (5 for 7) against the Parsees. He also toured North America with Lord Hawke's XI in 1894, making two first-class appearances against the Gentlemen of Philadelphia.

== Hampshire ==
=== Early years at Hampshire ===
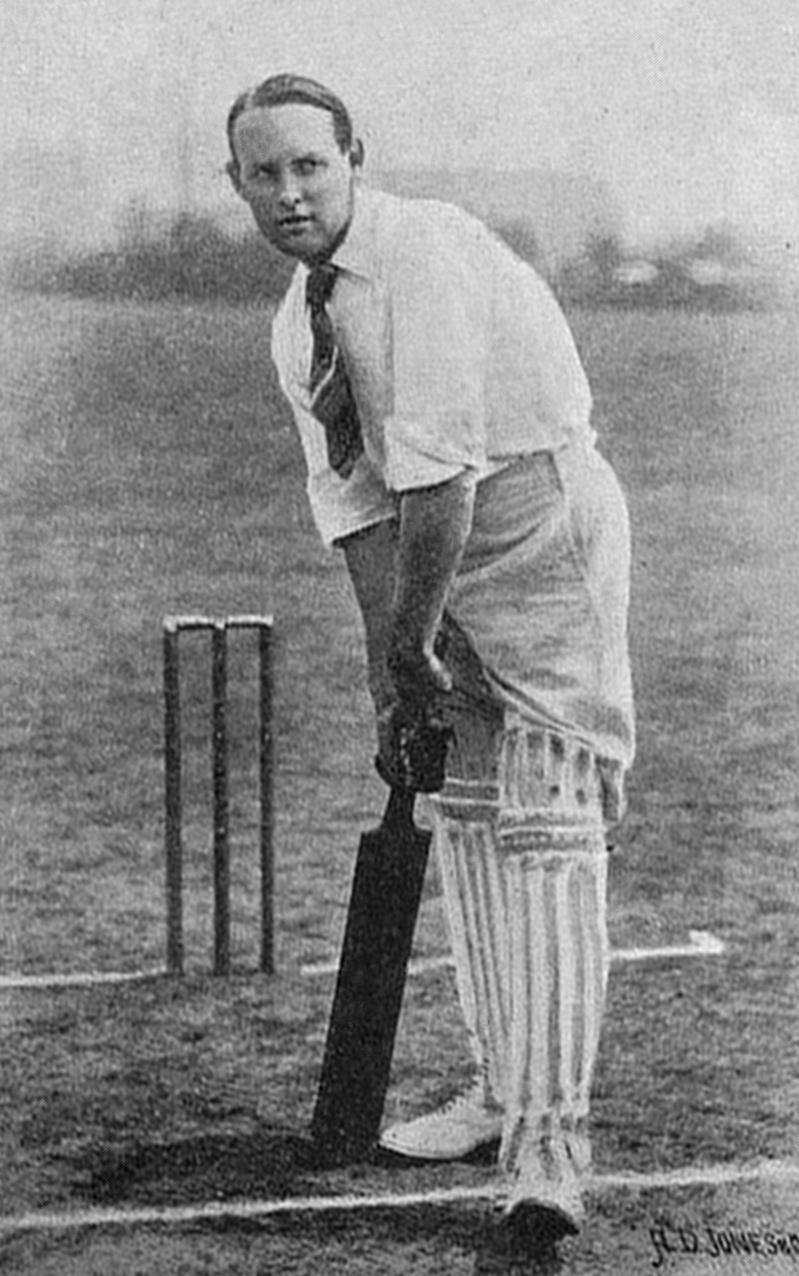
Hill, in the year he played Test cricket

Hill first played county cricket in 1888 for Wiltshire, five years prior to the official formation of its county club. He first played for Hampshire in 1890, when they were a second-class county. Having regained their first-class status in 1894, which had been lost in 1885, he made his debut for Hampshire in first-class cricket against Somerset in the 1895 County Championship. He made twenty first-class appearances for Hampshire during the season, scoring 800 runs at an average of 21.05, whilst with the ball he took 16 wickets at an average of 38.18.

Following the season, Hill once again toured with Lord Hawke's personal team, this time touring South Africa. Hill performed well on the tour, gaining him selection for the matches against South Africa, for which the touring team was designated as England. Hill played in all three matches against South Africa, which were later retrospectively granted Test status. In the first Test at Port Elizabeth, he made scores of 25 and 37. In England's innings victory in the second Test at Johannesburg, he made a half century (65 runs), whilst in the third Test, which was also an innings victory for England, he made a century (124 runs) opening the batting. He concluded his brief Test career with 251 runs at an average of 62.75, whilst with the ball he took 4 wickets at an average of exactly 2. A banker by profession, following the conclusion of the tour Hill remained in South Africa on business, resulting in him not partaking in the 1896 English season.

Hill returned for the 1897 season, opening his season by playing for Charles Thornton's personal eleven against Cambridge University. He featured for Hampshire on fourteen occasions throughout the season, in addition to playing for the Gentlemen in the Gentlemen v Players fixture. He made one century and scored 540 runs during the season, but had greater success with the ball, taking 40 wickets at an average of 21.20, whilst taking his career-best figures of 7 for 36 against Leicestershire. His good all-round form continued across into the following season, with Hill again taking 40 wickets at an average of 21.50, whilst improving his batting return with 662 runs at an average of 30.09; he a score of 199 against Surrey at The Oval that season, which was to be the highest of his career. He featured less frequently in 1899, but still managed to score 672 runs at an average of 39.52, making 168 against Warwickshire. However, his bowling returns declined significantly in 1899 with 17 wickets at an average of 49.58, but improved in 1900 when he took 30 wickets at an average of 31.06.

=== Later career with Hampshire ===
Following the 1900 season Hill was seldom utilised as a bowler, having changed his bowling style to become a lob bowler. At the turn of the century, he endured a quiet period with the bat. He found form once again in 1903, scoring 515 runs at an average of 46.81 from seven matches; he made three centuries during the season, including a score of 150 against Derbyshire in his first County Championship match of the season. His good form continued into 1904, when he scored 698 runs at average of 41.05 from eleven matches. Against Worcestershire that season, he made scores of 98 not out and 117. In 1905, he scored the same number of runs he did in 1904, made at a higher average and from fewer matches played; against Somerset, he made scores of 124 and 118 not out. His unbeaten second innings was notable for his opening partnership of 150 runs with Teddy Wynyard, with both batsman being handicapped; Hill was lame and struggled to run between the wickets, so scored mostly in boundaries (one six and 22 fours), whilst Wynyard had a damaged thumb and could only bat with one hand, with his contribution to the partnership amounting to 18 runs. Ledger remained consistent over the following three seasons, scoring over 500 runs and averaging in the thirties with the bat.

Following the 1908 season, Hill's appearances for Hampshire became more irregular. He played seven times for Hampshire in 1909, but struggled with the bat, scoring 175 runs at an average of 14.58. In 1910, he made five appearances for Hampshire, but made no major contributions with the bat, whilst the following season he played just twice in the 1911 County Championship. Hill toured Argentina with the Marylebone Cricket Club in February–March 1912, making three first-class appearances against the Argentine cricket team. He played once for Hampshire against Cambridge University in 1912, whilst in 1913 he made two appearances, playing against Derbyshire in the County Championship, and Oxford University. He did not feature in first-class cricket in the truncated 1914 season.

=== War service and post-war cricket ===
Hill served in the First World War as a volunteer with the Hampshire Volunteer Regiment (Territorial Force), being commissioned as a temporary second lieutenant in September 1916, with him being appointed a temporary lieutenant in December 1917. He returned to play for Hampshire following the end of the war in November 1918. He played three times for Hampshire in 1919, making two County Championship appearances, in addition to playing against the Australian Imperial Forces. He followed that up with three further appearances in the 1920 County Championship, before making a final appearance in the 1921 County Championship against Gloucestershire; during the 1921 season, he had the unusual occurrence of being a member of the Hampshire playing staff alongside his son, Anthony. Described by Wisden as being "a splendid batsman with a free, natural approach to the game", he made 161 appearances in first-class cricket for Hampshire. In these, he scored 8,381 runs at an average of 30.58; he made seventeen centuries and 38 half centuries. As a bowler, he took 199 wickets for Hampshire at a bowling average of 31.22, taking three five wicket hauls.

== Other sports ==
Hill played rugby union for the Trojans Rugby Club and Hampshire, succeeding former Hampshire captain Charles Robson as captain of the Trojans Rugby Club in 1910. Alongside playing rugby union, he also represented Hampshire in field hockey. He continued to play racquets into adulthood, and was noted to be a good boxer.

== Death ==
Hill died in Romsey in September 1950. His nephew, Richard Page, was also a first-class cricketer.

== Works cited ==
- "Obituary: A. J. L . Hill". The Cricketer Annual. London. 1950–51.
