= Roger Ellis (schoolmaster) =

British headmaster (1929–2023)

Roger Wykeham Ellis
- Born: 3 October 1929; Paddington, London, England
- Died: 14 February 2023 (aged 93)
- Education: Trinity College, Oxford
- Occupation: Headmaster

Roger Wykeham Ellis CBE (3 October 1929 – 14 February 2023) was a British schoolmaster, successively head of Rossall School and Marlborough College and Chairman of the Headmasters' Conference.

== Early life ==
Born in Paddington, Westminster, in October 1929, the son of Cecil Ellis, a solicitor, and his wife Pamela Unwin, Ellis was educated at St Peter's School, Seaford, Winchester College, and Trinity College, Oxford, where he held a scholarship and graduated BA and MA (conferred).

Descended through his mother from William the Conqueror, he served in the Royal Navy from 1947 to 1949.

== Career ==
Ellis was appointed an assistant master at Harrow School in 1952 and served as housemaster of the Headmaster's House there from 1961 to 1967. In September of that year he took up his first headship, at Rossall School, and in 1972 transferred to Marlborough College as Master (or head), succeeding J. C. Dancy. In the Michaelmas term of 1973, Ellis preached a sermon in the chapel of Abingdon School, and in the summer of 1977 visited Stowe School for the same purpose.

Marlborough College was the first boys' public school in England to admit girls, and in March 1974 Ellis told The New York Times that "The senior boys had a strong social need for the idea, and the girls clearly had a civilizing effect on them."

While at Marlborough, Ellis was a member of the Wiltshire County Council Education Committee (1975—1986). In 1983, he was elected as chairman of the Headmasters' Conference and retired from teaching in 1986.

Soon after leaving Marlborough, Ellis was appointed by Barclays Bank as its Graduate Recruitment Manager, a role he carried out until 1991.

== Voluntary work ==
Ellis served as a governor of several schools. In 1975 he joined the governing body of Cheam School and later chaired it, from 1987 to 1993; he was also a governor of Campion School, Athens, of Harrow School, where he had been a housemaster in the 1960s, and of St Edward's School, Oxford, where he was chairman from 1992 to 1999.

In his Athleticism in the Victorian and Edwardian Public School (1981), J. A. Mangan thanked Ellis for his help and for opening doors for him.

== Personal life and death ==
In 1964, Ellis married Margaret Jean Stevenson, and they had one son and two daughters. His wife was the sister of Dame Anne Griffiths, librarian and archivist to Prince Philip, Duke of Edinburgh.

In 1974, Ellis deposited in the Devon County Records Office the Memoirs and Diaries of Henry Ellis of Exeter (1790–1859), jeweller and clockmaker.

Ellis died of heart failure on 14 February 2023, at the age of 93.

== Honours ==
- 1984 New Year Honours: Commander of the Order of the British Empire

== Publication ==
- R. W. Ellis, Who's Who in Victorian Britain 1851–1901 (Stackpole Books, 2001) ISBN 978-0811716406
