= Henry Bell (cricketer) =

English cricketer and Anglican clergyman

Personal information
- Full name: Henry Bell
- Born: 4 January 1838; Oulton, Yorkshire, England
- Died: 11 June 1919 (aged 81); Saint-Jean-de-Luz, Pyrénées-Atlantiques, France
- Batting: Unknown

Career statistics
Competition	First-class
Matches	1
Runs scored	1
Batting average	1.00
100s/50s	–/–
Top score	1*
Catches/stumpings	–/–
- Source: Cricinfo, 17 November 2019

Henry Bell (4 January 1838 – 11 June 1919) was an English first-class cricketer and an Anglican clergyman.

The son of the Reverend John Bell, he was born in January 1838 at Oulton, Yorkshire. He was educated at Marlborough College, where he played cricket for the college eleven. From Marlborough he proceeded to University College, Durham. He made a single appearance in first-class cricket for the Gentlemen of the North against the Gentlemen of the South at The Oval in 1862. Batting twice in the match, Bell was dismissed without scoring in the Gentlemen of the North first-innings by W. Little, while in their second-innings he was not out batting at number eleven, having scored a single run. After graduating from Durham, he returned to Marlborough to take up the post of assistant master, which he held between 1862–72. By 1878, he was the personal chaplain to Lord Muncaster while also concurrently serving as vicar of Muncaster. He was appointed to the position of honorary canon of Carlisle Cathedral in 1888, while the following year he was appointed as proctor for the Archdeacon of Furness, Arthur Crosse. Bell died in France at Saint-Jean-de-Luz in June 1919. His son, Aubrey FitzGerald Bell, was a Portuguese and Spanish scholar.
