= Inglewood Parkin =

English cricketer

Personal information
- Full name: Inglewood Urban Parkin
- Born: 5 October 1875; Ashford, Kent, England
- Died: 7 November 1948 (aged 73); Ainstable, Cumberland, England
- Batting: Unknown
- Role: Wicket-keeper

Career statistics
Competition	First-class
Matches	2
Runs scored	8
Batting average	4.00
100s/50s	–/–
Top score	5*
Catches/stumpings	1/–
- Source: Cricinfo, 16 May 2020

Inglewood Urban Parkin (5 October 1875 – 7 November 1948) was an English first-class cricketer and businessman.

The son of The Reverend D. D. Parkin, he was born in October 1875 at Ashford, Kent. He was educated at Marlborough College, before going up to Oriel College, Oxford. A keen amateur cricketer, Parkin toured North America with Bernard Bosanquet's XI in September–October 1901, making two first-class appearances against the Gentlemen of Philadelphia, with Parkin scoring 8 runs in the first-class matches on the tour. He later served in the First World War, being commissioned as a second lieutenant in the Labour Corps in August 1917. Following the war, he was made a temporary lieutenant in March 1919. Parkin was involved in the coal mining industry in Kent, where he ran the Parkins Colliery Company. He died in November 1948 at Ainstable, Cumberland.
