= Nicholas Ross (cricketer) =

Scottish cricketer

Personal information
- Full name: Nicholas Peter Gilbert Ross
- Born: 2 October 1947 (age 79); Edinburgh, Midlothian, Scotland
- Batting: Left-handed
- Bowling: Leg break googly

Domestic team information
- Years: Team
- 1969–1970: Cambridge University
- 1979: Cambridgeshire

Career statistics
Competition	First-class
Matches	8
Runs scored	224
Batting average	28.00
100s/50s	–/1
Top score	68
Balls bowled	347
Wickets	9
Bowling average	29.00
5 wickets in innings	–
10 wickets in match	–
Best bowling	2/22
Catches/stumpings	5/–
- Source: Cricinfo, 20 July 2019

Nicholas Peter Gilbert Ross (born 2 October 1947) is a Scottish former first-class cricketer.

Ross was born at Edinburgh . He was educated at Marlborough College, before going up to Selwyn College, Cambridge. While studying at Cambridge, he made his debut in first-class cricket for Cambridge University against Essex at Fenner's in 1969. He played seven further first-class matches for Cambridge, the last coming in 1970. In his eight first-class matches for Cambridge, he scored 224 runs at an average of 28.00 and a high score of 68. With his leg break googly bowling, he took 9 wickets with best figures of 2 for 22. In addition to playing first-class cricket, he also played minor counties cricket for Cambridgeshire in 1979, making three appearances in the Minor Counties Championship.
