= William Wright (cricketer, born 1841) =

English cricketer and British Army officer

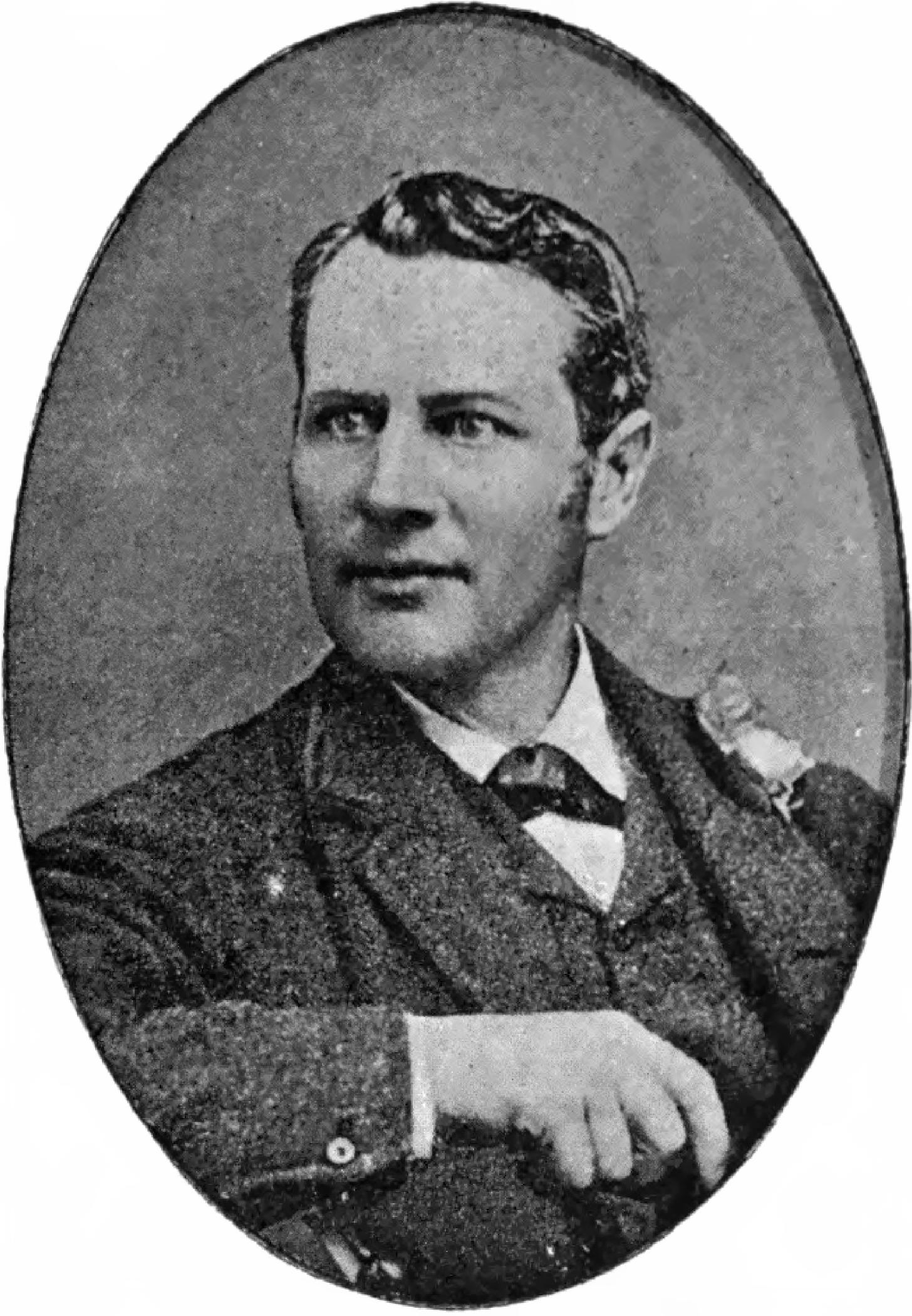

Personal information
- Full name: William Henry Wright
- Born: 10 August 1841; Drayton Parslow, Buckinghamshire, England
- Died: 28 December 1916 (aged 75); Pimlico, London, England
- Batting: Unknown

Domestic team information
- Years: Team
- 1866: Marylebone Cricket Club

Career statistics
Competition	First-class
Matches	2
Runs scored	5
Batting average	1.66
100s/50s	–/–
Top score	3
Catches/stumpings	–/–
- Source: Cricinfo, 5 August 2019

William Henry Wright (10 August 1841 – 28 December 1916) was an English first-class cricketer and British Army officer.

Wright was born in August 1841 at Drayton Parslow, Buckinghamshire. He was educated at Marlborough College, before attending the Royal Military Academy, Woolwich. He graduated from Woolwich into the Royal Artillery as a lieutenant in November 1860. Wright made two appearances in first-class cricket in May 1866, the first coming for the Gentlemen of England against Oxford University, with his second match coming for the Marylebone Cricket Club against Oxford University, with both matches played at Oxford. He was promoted to the rank of captain in 1873, before promotion to the rank of major in July 1881. He later died at Pimlico in December 1916.
