= The Heretick =

The Heretick is a satirical magazine published by students of Marlborough College; it was founded by the English poet John Betjeman in 1924. The magazine is published twice a year. Focusing on satire on both local and national events, its editors have included Anthony Blunt, Jack Whitehall, Al Gordon, Lara Prendergast, Georgina Kay, James Lloyd, Catherine Brydges, Catherine Okell, Jamie Batchelor and Hamish Woodhouse. Its motto is "Upon Philistia will I triumph".
