= Richard Page (cricketer) =

English cricketer and British Army officer

Personal information
- Full name: Richard Kennett Page
- Born: 24 January 1910; Bursledon, Hampshire, England
- Died: 27 July 2006 (aged 96); Baltinglass, Leinster, Ireland
- Batting: Right-handed
- Bowling: Leg break
- Relatives: Ledger Hill (uncle); Anthony Hill (cousin)

Career statistics
Competition	First-class
Matches	1
Runs scored	12
Batting average	6.00
100s/50s	–/–
Top score	12
Balls bowled	48
Wickets	0
Bowling average	–
5 wickets in innings	–
10 wickets in match	–
Best bowling	–
Catches/stumpings	–/–
- Source: Cricinfo, 14 April 2019

Richard Kennett Page MC MBE (24 January 1910 – 27 July 2006) was an English first-class cricketer and British Army officer. Page served with the Royal Artillery from 1930–1956, serving with distinction during the Second World War in which he was awarded the Military Cross. During his military career he also played first-class cricket for the British Army cricket team. In later life he was the vice-president of the Irish branch of the services charity SSAFA, for services to which he was made an MBE in 1995.

== Early life and military career ==
Page was born at Bursledon and educated at Marlborough College. From Marlborough he attended the Royal Military Academy, Woolwich. He graduated from Woolwich in January 1930, entering into the Royal Artillery as a second lieutenant. He was promoted to the rank of lieutenant in February 1933, with seniority to January 1933. He made a single appearance in first-class cricket for the British Army cricket team against Cambridge University at Fenner's in 1937. Batting twice in the match, he was dismissed for a 12 runs by Michael White in the Army's first-innings, while in their second-innings he was dismissed without scoring by John Cameron. He opened the bowling with his leg breaks alongside John Stephenson in the Cambridge first-innings, but went wicketless from eight overs bowled. He was promoted to the rank of captain in August 1938. Having served in the Second World War, he was awarded the Military Cross in October 1945, and was mentioned in dispatches in November 1945 and June 1946, for his efforts during the war.

== Later military career and life ==
In the same month he was promoted to the rank of major. He was promoted to the rank of lieutenant colonel in April 1952. He served as the regimental lieutenant colonel until April 1955. He retired from active service in April 1956 and was placed on the Reserve of Officers list. Having exceeded the age for recall, he was removed from the list in January 1965.

In retirement he moved to Ireland, where he was the vice-president of the Irish branch of the SSAFA armed forces charity. He was recognised for his services to the charity in the 1995 Birthday Honours, when he was made an MBE. He died in July 2006 in hospital at Baltinglass, Leinster. His wife had predeceased him, with the couple having two children. His cousin, Anthony Hill, was a first-class cricketer, while his uncle Ledger Hill played Test cricket for England.
