= Marlborough College Malaysia =

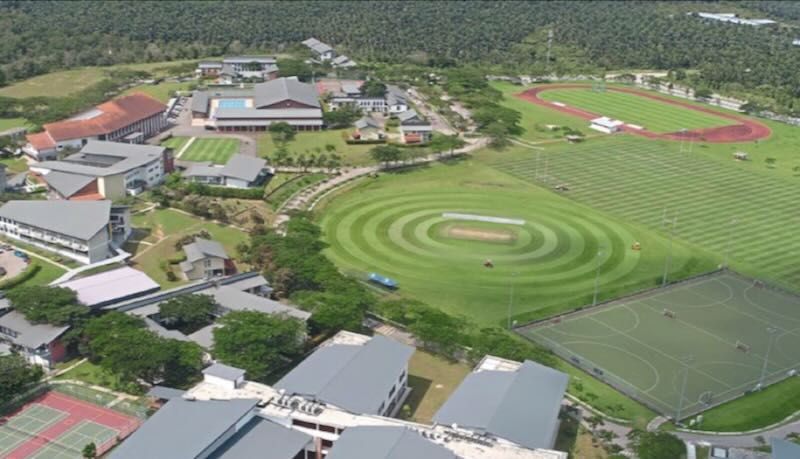

Location
- Jalan Marlborough; Iskandar Puteri; Johor, 79200; Malaysia; 1.4461°N 103.6509°E

Information
- Type: Private International School; Boarding school & Day school
- Motto: Latin: Deus Dat Incrementum (1 Corinthians 3:6: "God gives the Increase")
- Religious affiliation: Anglican foundation but focuses on spirituality rather than Christianity.
- Established: 2012
- Chairman of Council: Tunku Ali Redhauddin Tuanku Muhriz
- Principal: MRS dajouo
- Master: Simon Burbury
- Gender: Co-educational
- Age: 3 to 18
- Enrollment: 890
- Education system: IGCSE, IB
- Language: English
- Campus size: 90-acre (0.36 km^{2})
- Campus type: Rural
- Houses: 14 (6 boarding and 8 day)
- Colours: Royal blue and white
- Nickname: MCM
- Publication: Piccalilli
- Yearbook: Marlburian Magazine
- Affiliation: HMC, Council of British International Schools, Federation of British International Schools in Asia
- Alumni: Old Marlburians
- Website: www.marlboroughcollegemalaysia.org

Marlborough College Malaysia is a UK-style curriculum boarding international school in Malaysia for boarding and day pupils. The school is the sister school of Marlborough College in Wiltshire, UK. The college comprises a Pre-Preparatory School for children aged 3 to 8 years; a Preparatory School for boarding and day pupils aged between 8 and 12 years; and a Senior School for boarding and day pupils aged between 13 and 18 years. The current enrollment is approximately 890 pupils, representing 43 nationalities, and the staff-to-pupil ratio at the College is 1:7. The majority of the teaching body have teaching experience either in Marlborough College UK or other British independent schools.

As of today, Marlborough College Malaysia is a full member of FOBISIA.

== History ==
Marlborough College Malaysia opened on 27 August 2012. The school was built on the former Honan palm plantation as part of the Iskandar Development project in Johor on the southern tip of peninsula Malaysia. The opening of the College was described as a catalytic project complementing the EduCity development and wider regeneration of the Iskandar region of Johor. Marlborough College Malaysia was officially opened by HRH Raja Zarith Sofiah Binti Almarhum Sultan Idris Shah, consort to the Sultan of Johor, on 24 February 2013. The founding Master of the College was Mr Robert Pick, former Second Master of Marlborough College in the UK. Following Mr Pick's retirement, Mr Alan Stevens took over as Master on 1 August 2017 until July 2023. Mr Simon Burbury became Master on 1 August 2023. The schools was listed in 2022 in The Schools Index of the world's 150 best private schools and as one of the top 15 in the China and Southeast Asia category.

=== Names of the Houses ===
Senior Boarding Houses	Prep Boarding Houses	Senior Day Houses	Prep School Houses
Honan	Iskandar	Wallace	Hunt
Munawir Hill	Taylor	Thompson	Merlin
Wills		Butler	Seymour
Steel		Sheppard	Chichester
		Bickerton	
		Morley	

== Masters (headmasters) of Marlborough College Malaysia ==
- 2012–2017 Robert Pick
- 2017–2023 Alan Stevens
- 2023– Simon Burbury

== Governance ==
Marlborough College Malaysia is operated by M East Sdn Bhd, and its directors are mostly old pupils of Marlborough College. The directors as of 2023 are: HRH Tunku Ali Redhauddin Tuanku Muhriz (Chairman), Richard Fleck CBE, Dr Chin Joo Lim, Jessie W Y Soon, Ir Wan Adlan Affandy bin Wan Abdul Rahman, Chua Guan-Hock SC, Lau Huan Yeong, Nicholas Sampson, Tom Kirkwood, John Baker, Amran Hafiz Affifudin and Kristy Castleton.

=== IGCSE ===
All pupils follow the core curriculum: English Language, English Literature, Mathematics and the three Sciences. Four more subjects may be chosen from the lists below (within various option groups):

Economics	Music
Geography	Physical Education
History	Religious Studies
Art	Mandarin First Language
Computer Science	Mandarin Foreign Language
Design and Technology	Malay First Language
Drama	Malay Foreign Language
French	Additional Mathematics
Spanish	

In 2025, 61.3% of all grades were awarded at A*/A, with the cohort of 73 pupils achieving an average grade of A.

=== IB Diploma ===
In the Sixth Form, pupils study the International Baccalaureate (IB) Program IB Diploma Programme results in 2023 averaged at 33 points, 14% of pupils achieved over 40 points and a 97% pass rate. Some pupils went on to study at Universities.
