= Drayton Parslow =

Village in Buckinghamshire, England

Coordinates: 51.949°N 0.780°W

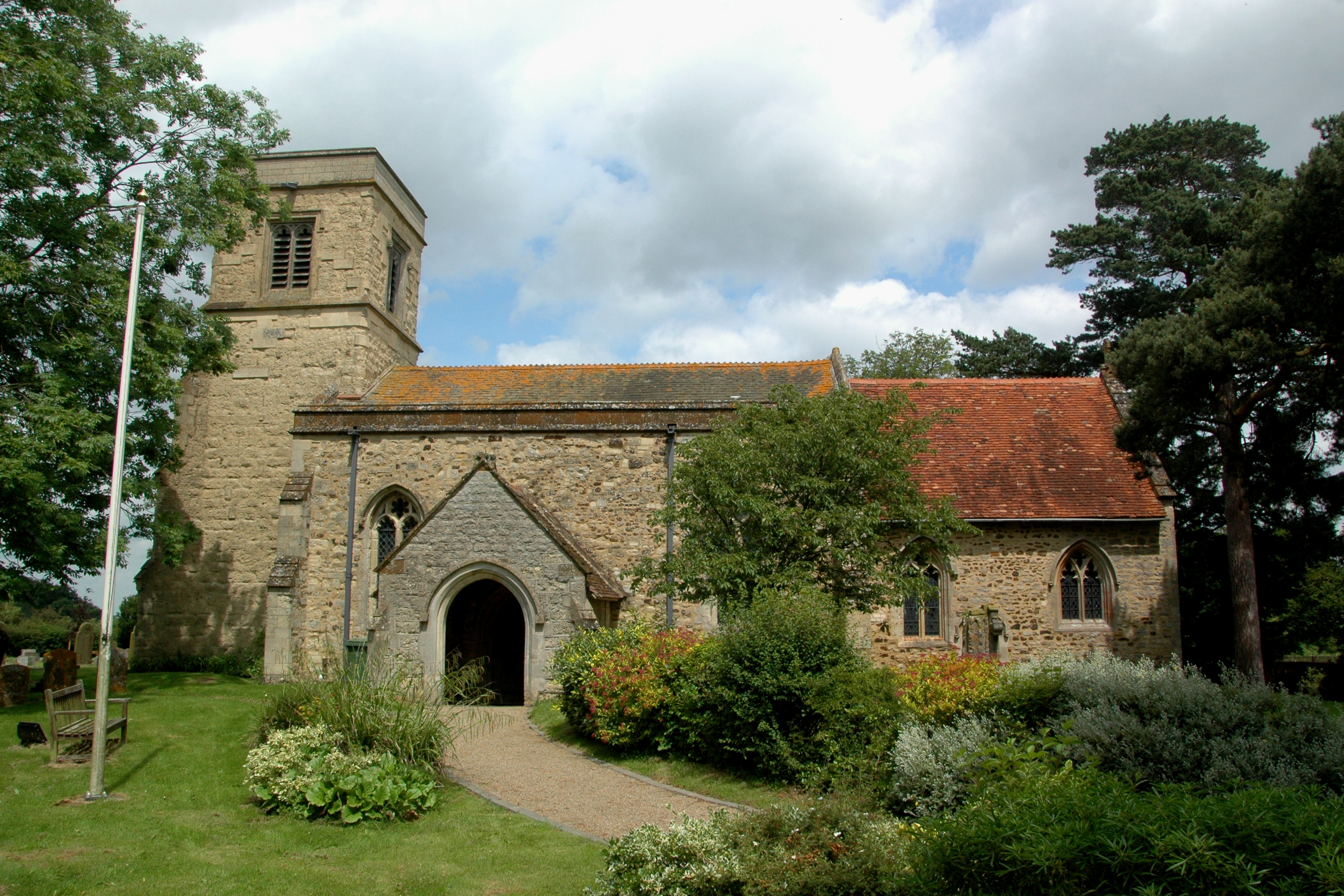
- Holy Trinity parish church

- Location within Buckinghamshire
- Population: 614 (2011 Census)
- OS grid reference: SP8328
- Civil parish: Drayton Parslow
- Unitary authority: Buckinghamshire
- Ceremonial county: Buckinghamshire
- Region: South East
- Country: England
- Sovereign state: United Kingdom
- Post town: Milton Keynes
- Postcode district: MK17
- Dialling code: 01296
- Police: Thames Valley
- Fire: Buckinghamshire
- Ambulance: South Central
- UK Parliament: Buckingham and Bletchley
- Website: Drayton Parslow Village

Drayton Parslow is a village and civil parish in Buckinghamshire, England, about 3.5 miles (5.6 km) south of Bletchley, within the Buckinghamshire Council unitary authority area. In the 2001 census the parish had a population of 596, increasing at the 2011 census to 614.

== Toponym ==
In the 11th century the toponym was Draintone or Draitone. This is derived from Old English and means "farm where sledges are used". It is a common English toponym for places that were on a hillside, where a sledge rather than a cart was needed for heavy loads. By the 13th century it had become Draitone Passele, referring to the Passelewe family, who tenanted the manor of Drayton from the latter part of the 11th century. It evolved through Draygtone Passelewe in the 14th century and Draighton Perselow in the 17th century before reaching its current form.

== Manor ==
In the reign of Edward the Confessor in the 11th century, Lewin de Nuneham held a manor of two hides and one virgate at Drayton. After the Norman Conquest of England, Lewin was displaced as feudal overlord by the Norman Geoffrey de Montbray, Bishop of Coutances. De Montbray tried unsuccessfully to displace the Passelewes as his tenants, and the family retained Drayton until 1379 when it passed by marriage to the Purcell family. In 1461 it was conveyed to a descendant of the Passelewes, William Laycon, in whose family it then remained until at least 1570.

In Edward the Confessor's reign, two brothers held a second, smaller manor of three virgates at Drayton. The Domesday Book records that by 1086 William I's half-brother Odo, Bishop of Bayeux held the fief of this manor. However, Odo was tried for fraud in 1076 and disgraced again in 1082 for acting without Royal authority, and his extensive estates were eventually escheated to the Crown. Odo's Drayton manor was annexed to the Honour of Ampthill in Bedfordshire. In 1562 it was linked with the manor of East Greenwich, and the last record of overlordship of this manor is dated 1607.

== Church and chapels ==
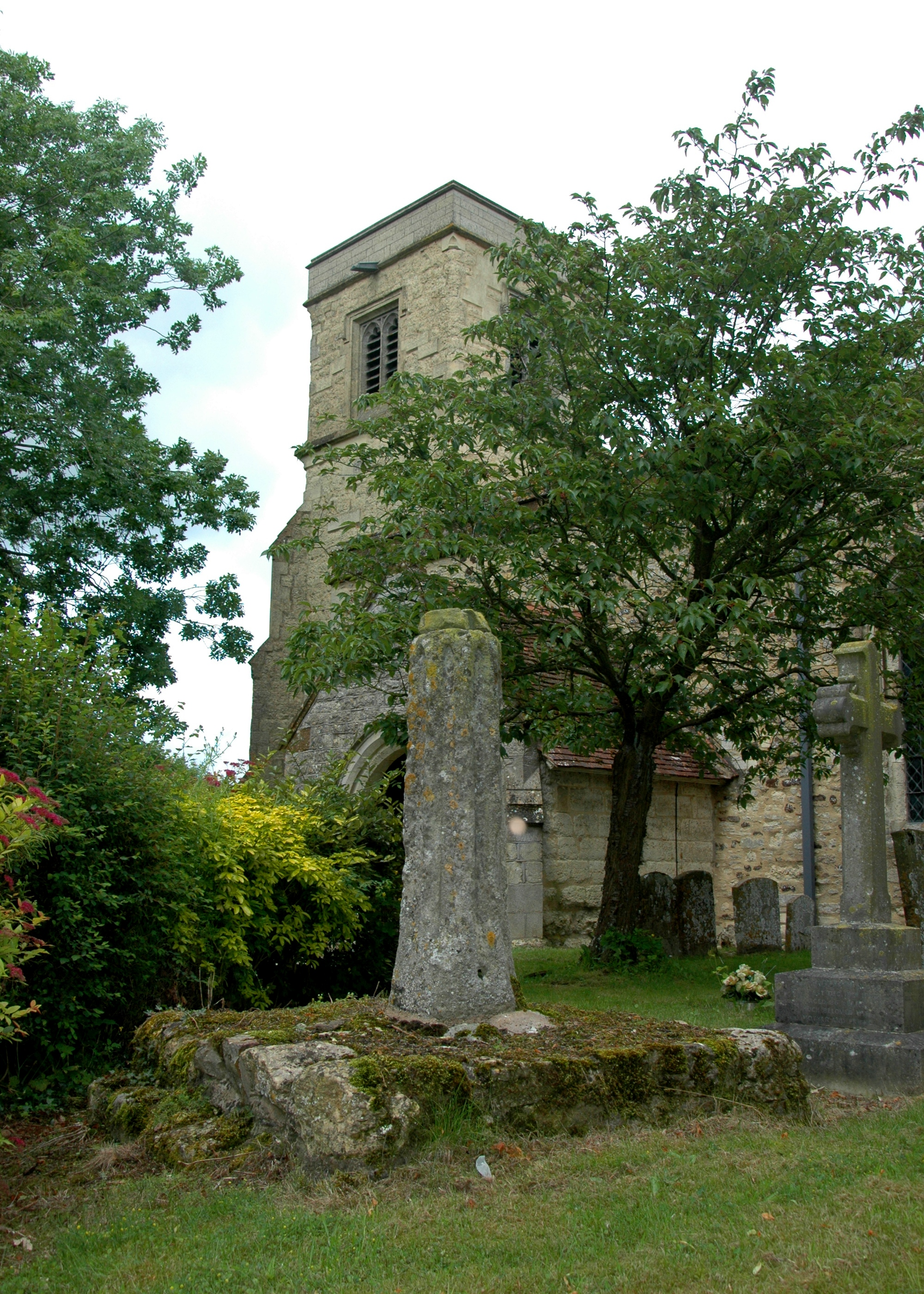
Base and broken shaft of Medieval preaching cross in Holy Trinity churchyard

=== Church of England ===
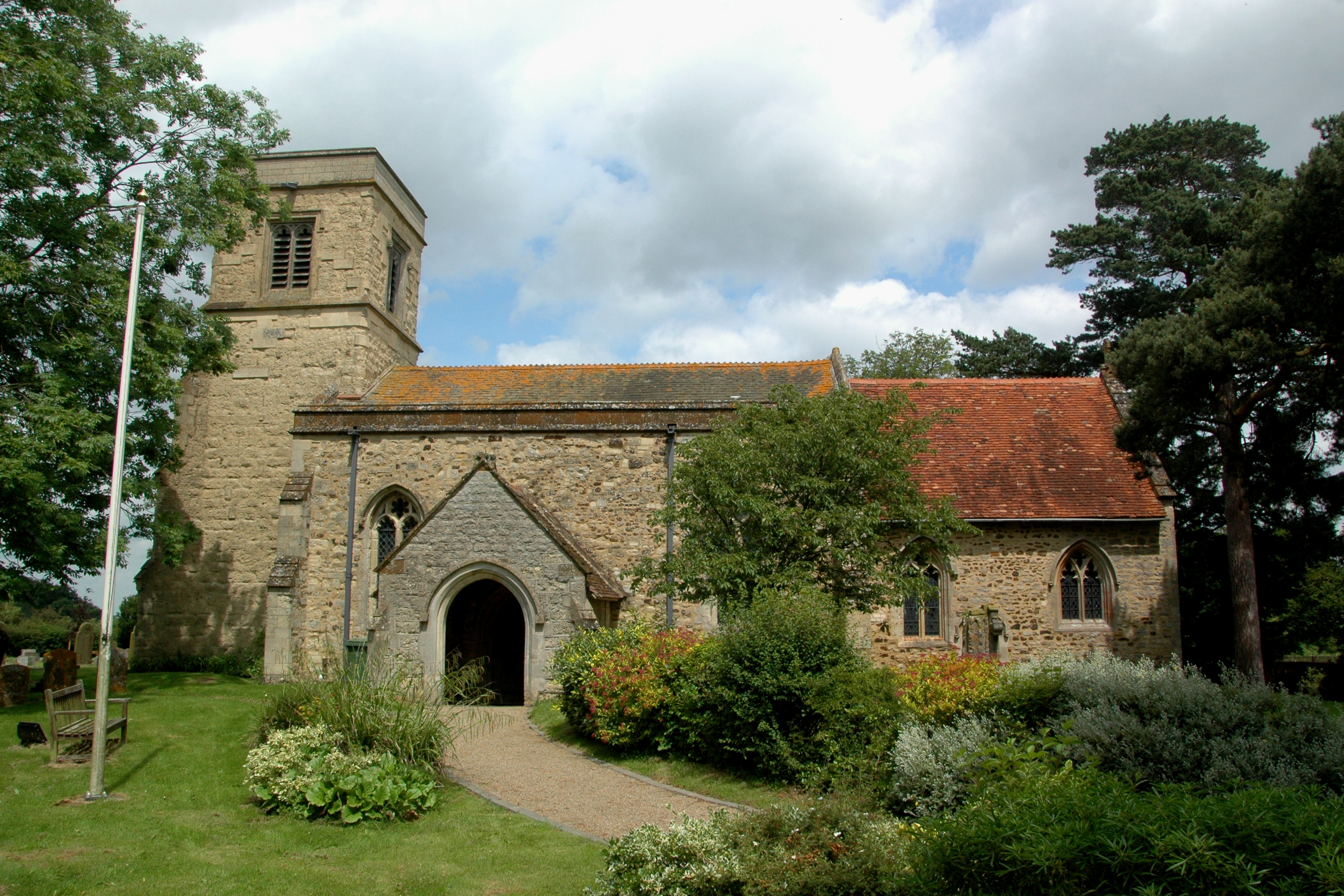
Holy Trinity south

The Church of England parish church of the Holy Trinity contains fragments of 12th-century masonry. The first known documentary record of the parish church is from 1232. The chancel was rebuilt in the 14th century in the Decorated Gothic style. In the 15th century the nave was rebuilt and the west tower was built or rebuilt in the Perpendicular Gothic style. Of the same period are the Perpendicular Gothic hexagonal baptismal font, the three-light east window of the chancel, a 15th-century alabaster relief above the altar depicting the Crucifixion of Jesus and fragments of 15th-century stained glass in the windows. In the 16th century the south porch was added. In 1863 the church was restored and the chancel was extended about 6 feet (2 m) eastwards, re-using the Perpendicular east window in the new position. Holy Trinity is now a Grade II* listed building.

By 1925 Holy Trinity had a ring of three bells. Bartholomew Atton of Buckingham cast the tenor bell in 1591. John Taylor & Co of Loughborough, who at the time also had a foundry at Oxford, cast the treble and second bell in 1842. In 1935 these became the fourth and fifth bells as John Taylor & Co cast a new treble, second and third bells, increasing the ring to six.

Holy Trinity has also a Sanctus bell that was cast in 1669 by Anthony Chandler, who worked at his family's bell-foundry in the village (see below).

Holy Trinity parish is now part of the Benefice of Newton Longville, Mursley, Swanbourne, Little Horwood and Drayton Parslow.

Drayton Rectory is a Georgian house of five bays built in 1753 or 1754.

Holy Trinity Church has been Grade II* listed (Entry Number: 1289256) since 19 August 1959. The summary states: "Fragments of C12 masonry, C14 chancel, C15 nave and W. tower, C16 S. porch. All much restored C19".

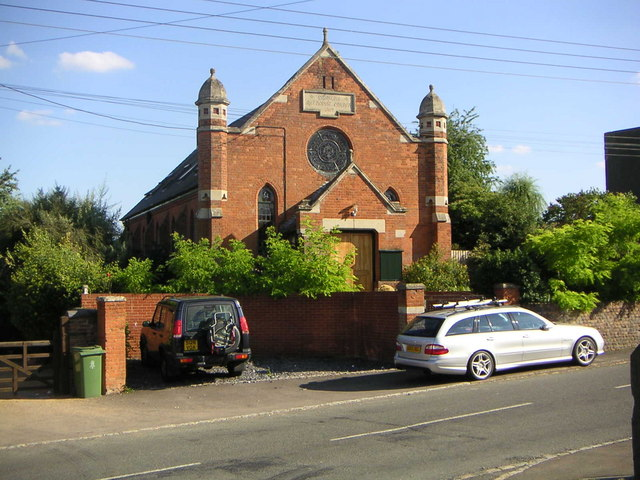
Former Primitive Methodist chapel, now a private house

=== Baptist ===
Drayton Baptist Chapel was built in 1830. The chapel is now closed and the building sold in 2022.

=== Methodist ===
Drayton's first Primitive Methodist chapel was built in 1847. In 1912 it was replaced with a new Gothic Revival red brick chapel, and in 1932 it became part of the Methodist Union. Drayton's Methodist congregation declined in the 1960s and 70s, and in 1984 the chapel was sold and converted into a private house.

== History ==
The settlement is recorded in the Domesday Book (1086) which lists 18 households. In later years, the top end of the village became known as Hog End and later, Church End. Until the 1800s, most residents worked in agriculture.

=== Bell-foundry ===
Drayton Parslow had a bell-foundry from 1635 to 1754. It was started by Richard I Chandler and run by members of his family for the next 91 years. In 1726 Edward Hall took over, and continued the business until 1754. By early 1800, the business was no longer in operation, probably because of increasing competition.

Reports indicate that 163 bells that were cast by founders from Drayton Parslow are known to survive. Examples in Buckinghamshire include bells at St James, Aston Abbotts, St Nicholas, Ickford and St Giles, Pitchcott and the Sanctus bell at St John the Evangelist, Whitchurch. There are also examples in Oxfordshire including at The Assumption of the Blessed Virgin Mary, Beckley, St Michael's, Fringford, St Mary the Virgin, Kidlington and SS Peter and Paul, Steeple Aston and the Sanctus bells at St Mary, Chesterton and St Nicholas', Emmington. An example in Northamptonshire is at St James the Less, Sulgrave.

=== World War I and II ===
Residents of the village were involved in both world wars. The village has a memorial obelisk that states: Commemoration First World War (1914–1918), Second World War (1939–1945) at the junction of Main Road and Chapel Lane.

According to Historic England, the village was also a World War II outstation to the Government Code and Cipher School at Bletchley Park; some of the work was moved here in 1943 when the group needed more space. Another source indicates that the buildings were also used as a prisoner of war camp, and after the war, as a hostel for displaced persons and those employed at the brick works. After the war, the Post Office used some of the buildings as a training centre. By the late 1980s the site had been redeveloped; a housing estate is now located there, Prospect Close.

== Amenities ==
Drayton Parslow Village School is a mixed, community, infant school, which educates children between the ages of four and seven and has about 45 pupils. Since 2007 the school has been in a partnership sharing a single headteacher with the schools in Mursley and Swanbourne. Many parish children older than seven go to Swanbourne C of E School, the Junior school of the Three Schools, while others travel to Stewkley or Winslow.

Drayton Parslow has a public house, The Three Horseshoes. The community has a village hall (Greenacre Hall), a Sports and Social Club, and a recreation field with playground and cricket pitch. A MUGA (multi-use games area) is located beside the village hall. The village school educates children to Year 3; Schools are located in the nearby communities for Grade 4 to 7.

In 2004, part of the village was declared a Conservation Area "of special architectural or historic interest, the character or appearance of which it is desirable to preserve or enhance".

== Notable people ==
- William Wright (1841–1916), cricketer

== Sources and further reading ==
- Page, W.H., ed. (1925). A History of the County of Buckingham. Victoria County History. Vol. 3. London: The St Katherine Press. pp. 345–348.
- Pevsner, Nikolaus (1960). Buckinghamshire. The Buildings of England. Harmondsworth: Penguin Books. pp. 111–112. ISBN 0-14-071019-1.
- RCHME, ed. (1913). An Inventory of the Historical Monuments in Buckinghamshire. Vol. 2, North. London: Her Majesty's Stationery Office. pp. 99–101.
