= George Ainsworth (cricketer) =

English cricketer and British Army officer

Personal information
- Full name: George William Bromilow Ainsworth
- Born: 21 March 1876; Freshfield, Lancashire, England
- Died: 3 March 1941 (aged 64); Bushey, Hertfordshire, England
- Batting: Unknown
- Relatives: Jerry Ainsworth (brother)

Career statistics
| Competition | First-class |
|---|---|
| Matches | 1 |
| Runs scored | 10 |
| Batting average | – |
| 100s/50s | –/– |
| Top score | 10* |
| Catches/stumpings | –/– |
- Source: Cricinfo, 18 February 2019

George William Bromilow Ainsworth (21 March 1876 – 3 March 1941) was an English first-class cricketer and British Army officer.

Ainsworth was born at Freshfield in Lancashire, and was educated at Marlborough College, entering in 1890 and leaving in 1893. He made one appearance in first-class cricket for H. D. G. Leveson Gower's XI against Oxford University at Oxford in 1902. He batted once during the match, scoring 10 runs without being dismissed. He served with the Royal Garrison Artillery during the latter stages of the First World War as a second lieutenant. He was promoted to the rank of lieutenant in August 1919. He resigned his commission in April 1920, retaining the rank of lieutenant.

He died at Bushey in Hertfordshire in March 1941. His brother, Jerry Ainsworth, was also a first-class cricketer.
