= Jerry Ainsworth =

English cricketer

Personal information
- Full name: Jerry Lionel Ainsworth
- Born: 11 September 1877; Formby, Lancashire
- Died: 30 December 1923 (aged 46); Falmouth, Cornwall
- Bowling: Slow left arm orthodox

Career statistics
Competition	First-class
Matches	11
Runs scored	44
Batting average	4
100s/50s	0/0
Top score	11
Balls bowled	1989
Wickets	50
Bowling average	15.82
5 wickets in innings	5
10 wickets in match	2
Best bowling	7/61
Catches/stumpings	7/–
- Source: CricketArchive, 5 October 2025

Jerry Lionel Ainsworth (11 September 1877 – 30 December 1923) was a first-class cricketer. He was born in Freshfield, Formby, Lancashire and died in Falmouth, Cornwall.

A slow left-arm bowler, he took 50 first-class wickets at just 15.82. He played 4 matches for Lancashire County Cricket Club in 1899 and also appeared for PF Warner's XI in 1898, AJ Webbe's XI in 1900, HDG Leveson-Gower's XI in 1902 and the Europeans in India in 1904/05.

His brother, George Ainsworth was also a first-class cricketer. Ainsworth was no batsman but took 5 wickets in an innings 5 times, 4 of these against the Philadelphians, against whom he claimed his best figures of 7 for 61.
