= William Pulman =

English cricketer

Personal information
- Full name: William Walker Pulman
- Born: 14 November 1852; Wellington, Somerset, England
- Died: 22 August 1936 (aged 83); Wellington, Somerset, England
- Batting: Right-handed

Domestic team information
- Years: Team
- 1874–1875: Oxford University

Career statistics
Competition	First-class
Matches	10
Runs scored	271
Batting average	18.06
100s/50s	–/–
Top score	46
Catches/stumpings	4/–
- Source: Cricinfo, 27 April 2020

William Walker Pulman (14 November 1852 – 22 August 1936) was an English first-class cricketer and clergyman.

The son of William Walker Pulman senior, he was born in November 1852 at Wellington, Somerset. He was educated at Marlborough College, before going up to St John's College, Oxford. While studying at Oxford, he played first-class cricket for Oxford University, making his debut against the Marylebone Cricket Club at Oxford in 1874. He played first-class cricket for Oxford until 1875, making ten appearances, which included two appearances in The University Match against Cambridge. He scored 271 runs in his ten matches, at an average of 18.06 and with a high score of 46. He was described by Wisden Cricketers' Almanack as “a free hitting batsman with sound style and could field with distinction anywhere”.

After graduating from Oxford, Pulman took holy orders in the Church of England. He held various curacies from 1876 to 1885, before becoming the rector of Westborough, Lincolnshire in 1885. He returned to his native Wellington in 1889 to become vicar there. It was there that Pulman died in August 1936.
