= Anthony Hill (cricketer) =

English cricketer

Personal information
- Full name: Anthony Ewart Ledger Hill
- Born: 14 July 1901; Romsey Extra, Hampshire, England
- Died: 25 October 1986 (aged 85); Winchester, Hampshire, England
- Batting: Right-handed
- Relatives: Ledger Hill (father); Richard Page (cousin)

Domestic team information
- Years: Team
- 1920–1930: Hampshire
- 1928: Marylebone Cricket Club

Career statistics
Competition	First-class
Matches	19
Runs scored	204
Batting average	7.55
100s/50s	–/–
Top score	24
Catches/stumpings	7/–
- Source: Cricinfo, 8 January 2010

Anthony Ewart Ledger Hill OBE DL (14 July 1901 — 25 October 1986) was an English first-class cricketer.

The son of the Hampshire and England all-rounder Ledger Hill, he was born in July 1901 in the civil parish of Romsey Extra, Hampshire. He was educated at Marlborough College, where he played for the college cricket team. He showed promise as an all-round cricketer at Marlborough, scoring a half century and taking matches figures of 8 for 99 against Rugby School in his final year.

Hill made his debut in first-class cricket for Hampshire against Gloucestershire at Southampton in the 1920 County Championship. He played first-class cricket for Hampshire until 1930, making eighteen appearances. In his eighteen matches, he scored 193 runs at an average of 7.42, with a highest score of 24. He was best remembered by Wisden as "a beautiful fielder". In addition to playing for Hampshire, Hill also made a single appearance in first-class cricket for the Marylebone Cricket Club against Wales at Lord's in 1928.

A few months prior to the start of the Second World War, Hill received a commission as a flying officer in the Royal Air Force Volunteer Reserve. He served during the war and was promoted to the temporary ranks flight lieutenant in September 1940 and squadron leader in December 1941. He resigned his commission in November 1944, retaining the rank of squadron leader.

Following the war, he was the vice-chairman of the Devenish Brewery in Weymouth and was appointed director of the Strong & Co Ltd brewery in Romsey in 1954. becoming chairman of Strongs five years later. He was also associated with the Hampshire and Isle of Wight Association of Boys' Clubs, acting as the organisation's chairman. He was appointed an OBE in the 1953 Coronation Honours for his work with the association. Hill was appointed a deputy lieutenant for Hampshire in September 1962. He died at Winchester in October 1986. His cousin, Richard Page, was also a first-class cricketer.
