= Walter Thorburn (cricketer) =

Scottish first-class cricketer (1884–1957)

Personal information
- Full name: Walter Hunter Thorburn
- Born: 7 October 1884; Innerleithen, Peeblesshire, Scotland
- Died: 27 March 1957 (aged 72); Peebles, Peeblesshire, Scotland
- Batting: Unknown
- Bowling: Unknown

Domestic team information
- Years: Team
- 1909–1912: Scotland

Career statistics
Competition	First-class
Matches	5
Runs scored	183
Batting average	30.50
100s/50s	–/1
Top score	90*
Balls bowled	6
Wickets	0
Bowling average	–
5 wickets in innings	–
10 wickets in match	–
Best bowling	–
Catches/stumpings	1/–
- Source: Cricinfo, 24 October 2022

Walter Hunter Thorburn (7 October 1884 – 27 March 1957) was a Scottish first-class cricketer.

The son of M. G. Thorburn, he was born in October 1884 at Innerleithen, Peeblesshire. He was educated in England at Marlborough College. In September 1903, he joined the Lanarkshire Imperial Yeomanry as a second lieutenant. A club cricketer for Peeblesshire, he made his debut in first-class cricket for Scotland against Ireland at Perth in 1909. He played first-class cricket for Scotland until 1912, making a further three appearances against Ireland and one against the touring Indians. He scored 183 runs in his five matches, at an average of 30.50 and a highest score of 90 not out. Thorburn served with the Lanarkshire Imperial Yeomanry in the First World War, holding the rank of captain in July 1916, the month in which he was made a temporary major. Outside of cricket, Thorburn was in business as a woollen manufacturer and mill owner; he was a senior director of Messrs Walter Thorburn & Bros. Ltd. He died at Peebles in March 1957.
