= Flannelled Fool =

Flannelled Fool: A Slice of a Life in the Thirties
- First edition
- Author: T. C. Worsley
- Language: English
- Genre: Autobiography
- Publisher: Alan Ross Ltd
- Publication date: 1967 (first edition)
- Publication place: United Kingdom
- Media type: Hardback and paperback
- Pages: 213 (hardback edition)

Flannelled Fool: A Slice of a Life in the Thirties is an autobiography by T. C. Worsley, published in 1967. It takes its title from a phrase in "The Islanders", a poem by Rudyard Kipling.

Though Flannelled Fool is subtitled A Slice of a Life in the Thirties, much of it treats the author's childhood and education at Marlborough College before he began a schoolmastering career at Wellington College in 1929.

== Publication ==
The frank accounts of many of its personages, only thinly disguised by false names, led, according to Alan Ross, the book's eventual publisher, to several rejections:

At least three leading publishers turned it down on legal advice, and Cuthbert Worsley himself admitted that he had been warned it was folly to expect publication. Re-reading it now I feel there were good reasons for anxiety, but at the time, with little to lose, it seemed worth the risk. Worsley had assured me that all the 'college' [Wellington] masters likely to cause trouble were dead, and Kurt Hahn, whose possible reaction had done most to scare off the others, was, safely, we hoped, back in Germany.

In the event, nothing happened. Far from bankrupting us or putting Cuthbert and me in gaol, the book both sold well and received a wonderful press.
