= T. C. Worsley =

British writer (1907–1977)

Thomas Cuthbert Worsley (10 December 1907 – 23 February 1977) was a British teacher, writer, editor, and theatre and television critic. He is best remembered for his autobiographical book Flannelled Fool: A Slice of a Life in the Thirties.

== Biography ==
Cuthbert Worsley was born on 10 December 1907 in Durham, the son of a rising Anglican clergyman. He was the third of four sons, with one sister. His father, F. W. Worsley—a Doctor of Divinity, a holder of the Military Cross, a former holder of the English long jump record and obsessive sportsman, and eventually Dean of Llandaff Cathedral—was a dominating but dysfunctional force in family life until his abrupt desertion, with two suitcases, of both family and deanery, when Worsley was a university student.

Worsley was educated initially at the Llandaff Cathedral school, transferring later to Brightlands preparatory school, Newnham-on-Severn, from where he won two scholarships to Marlborough College.

While at home from Marlborough during a summer vacation Worsley's younger brother Benjamin drowned at the seaside, an event incalculably traumatic for Worsley:

however gentle everyone was with me, I had the facts to face. I was alive and he was dead. He, the specially beloved of them all, the little genius, the most precious of any of us, hadn't survived. I had. And how could I forget that in the final climax of that deadly crisis, I had cast him off? I had torn myself free. If I hadn't, there would, of course, have been two deaths instead of one. True. But I had, I had actually, physically, deliberately, wilfully torn his clutching hands away from my thighs.

Are such traumas ever healed? Was I ever to be released from dreams in which such a thing had not happened? Or in which it turned out differently? In which I could swim and, swimming on my back, brought him to the shore as in the illustrations in the manuals? Would I ever be able to persuade myself that my story—accepted so willingly by the family—that I couldn't swim was true, when I had swum, I had swum thirty or forty yards to that rocky point and had got there—alone?

According to one account, this tragedy transformed Cuthbert into somewhat of a bore: when he was with a lover he would weep all the time, giving vent to his sense of guilt.

At Marlborough, following a year of general education, his studies were exclusively Classical and led to a scholarship at St John's College, Cambridge, from which, though he initially studied Classics, he graduated in English with a third-class degree. Throughout his school and university careers he was a successful cricketer, and his academic studies at Cambridge were neglected; but his sporting prowess helped him, immediately on graduating in 1929, to a position as schoolmaster at Wellington College. The story of his challenges to the traditions of the school is told in Flannelled Fool.

With Stephen Spender he went to Spain during the Spanish Civil War, some of his experiences being recorded decades later in Fellow Travellers. His The End of the Old School Tie (1941) was published as part of the Searchlight Books series edited by Tosco Fyvel and George Orwell. He later worked for the left-wing magazine New Statesman as assistant to Raymond Mortimer, the literary editor and drama critic. In 1958 he moved to the Financial Times as theatre and television critic.

He suffered from emphysema and died on 23 February 1977 in Kemp Town, Brighton.

== Bibliography ==
- Behind the Battle (1939)
- Education Today—and Tomorrow (with W. H. Auden) (1939)
- Barbarians and Philistines: Democracy and the Public Schools (1940)
- The End of the Old School Tie (1941)
- Shakespeare's Histories at Stratford 1951 (with J. Dover Wilson) (1952)
- The Fugitive Art: Dramatic Commentaries 1947-1951 (1952)
- Flannelled Fool: A Slice of a Life in the Thirties (1967)
- Five Minutes, Sir Matthew (1969)
- Television: The Ephemeral Art (1970)
- Fellow Travellers: A Memoir of the Thirties (1971)
