= John Christopher Dancy =

British schoolmaster and author

John Christopher Dancy (13 November 1920 – 28 December 2019) was an English headmaster, at Lancing College, where he was appointed to improve academic standards, and Marlborough College, and academic. He was best known for his reforms at Marlborough, including a coeducational Sixth Form. In the Introduction to his 1972 book Progressives and Radicals, Stewart wrote:

Some schools exemplify reform, but were not really regarded as radical: Rugby under Arnold, Shrewsbury under Butler, and Marlborough under Dancy.

== Life ==
The son of Dr. John Dancy of Richmond, Surrey, and Dr. Naomi Dancy, he was educated at Winchester College, and studied at New College, Oxford.

Dancy served in the British Army during World War II, first as a 2nd lieutenant in the Rifle Brigade in 1940. He was in its 8th Battalion to 1944, when he became an intelligence officer in the Second Army. He was a General Staff Officer in 30 Corps 1944–5, and in the I Airborne Corps in 1945.

== Educator ==
After the war, Dancy lectured in classics at Wadham College, Oxford, from 1946 to 1948. He taught as an assistant master at Winchester College from 1948 to 1953, and became headmaster of Lancing College in 1953. where academic standards had fallen. He went on to become Master of Marlborough College, in 1961.

In 1965 Dancy introduced business studies into the Marlborough curriculum, a high profile reaction to the Robbins Report. In 1968 came the introduction of girls to the Sixth Form, Marlborough being the first of the Headmasters' Conference institutions for boys (including most of the traditional British public schools) to take this step.

== Later life ==
After leaving his post at Marlborough, Dancy was Principal of St Luke's College, Exeter, from 1972 to 1978. St Luke's became part of the University of Exeter, and Dancy was Professor of Education there.

Dancy died aged 99. He walked with a limp, caused by polio.

== Works ==
- Commentary on I Maccabees (1954)
- The Public Schools and the Future (1963)
- Commentary on the Shorter Books of the Apocrypha (1972)
- Walter Oakeshott: a diversity of gifts (1995)
- The Divine Drama: The Old Testament as Literature (2001)

== Family ==
In 1944 Dancy married Angela Bryant, daughter of C. L. Bryant of Harrow. They had two sons and a daughter. Jonathan Dancy is one of the sons.
