= Marlborough College =

Independent school in Marlborough, Wiltshire, England

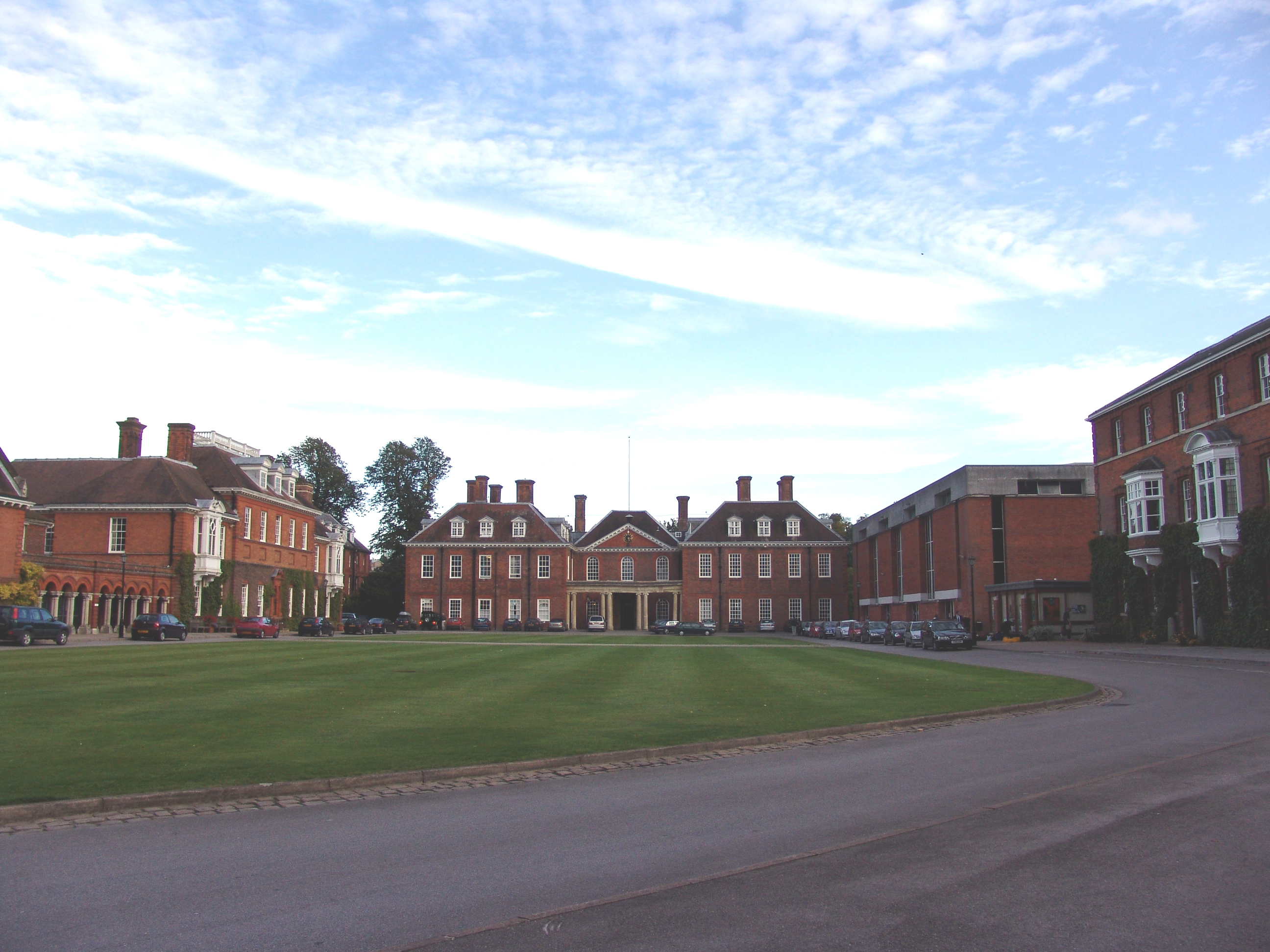

Location
- Marlborough, Wiltshire, SN8 1PA; England; 51.416°N 1.737°W

Information
- Type: Private school Boarding school
- Motto: Latin: Deus Dat Incrementum (1 Corinthians 3:6: God gives the increase)
- Religious affiliation: Church of England
- Established: 1843; 183 years ago
- Department for Education URN: 126516 Tables
- President: Stephen Lake
- Chair of Council: Heidi Venamore
- Master: Louise Moelwyn-Hughes
- Visitor: Justin Welby
- Gender: Co-educational
- Age: 13 to 18
- Enrolment: 1,011 (in 2024)
- Student to teacher ratio: 5:1
- Campus size: 286-acre (116 ha)
- Campus type: Semi-rural
- Houses: 16 boarding houses & 1 day house
- Colours: Navy & white
- Publication: The Marlburian; The Heretick; Piccalilli; Polyglot
- Budget: £69,172,000 (2024)
- Revenue: £73,314,000 (2024)
- Alumni: Old Marlburians
- Website: www.marlboroughcollege.org

Marlborough College is a public school (traditional description in the UK of fee-charging boarding schools) with day and boarding facilities for pupils aged 13 to 18 in Marlborough, Wiltshire, England. It was founded as Marlborough School in 1843 by the Dean of Manchester, George Hull Bowers, for the education of the sons of Church of England clergy. It now adopts a co-educational model. In 2023 there were around 1,000 pupils, approximately 45% of whom were female.

In 2024, the school was included in The Schools Index as one of the 150 best private schools in the world and among the top 30 senior schools in the UK. Fees for boarding pupils in 2024/2025 are £50,985 per year.

== History ==
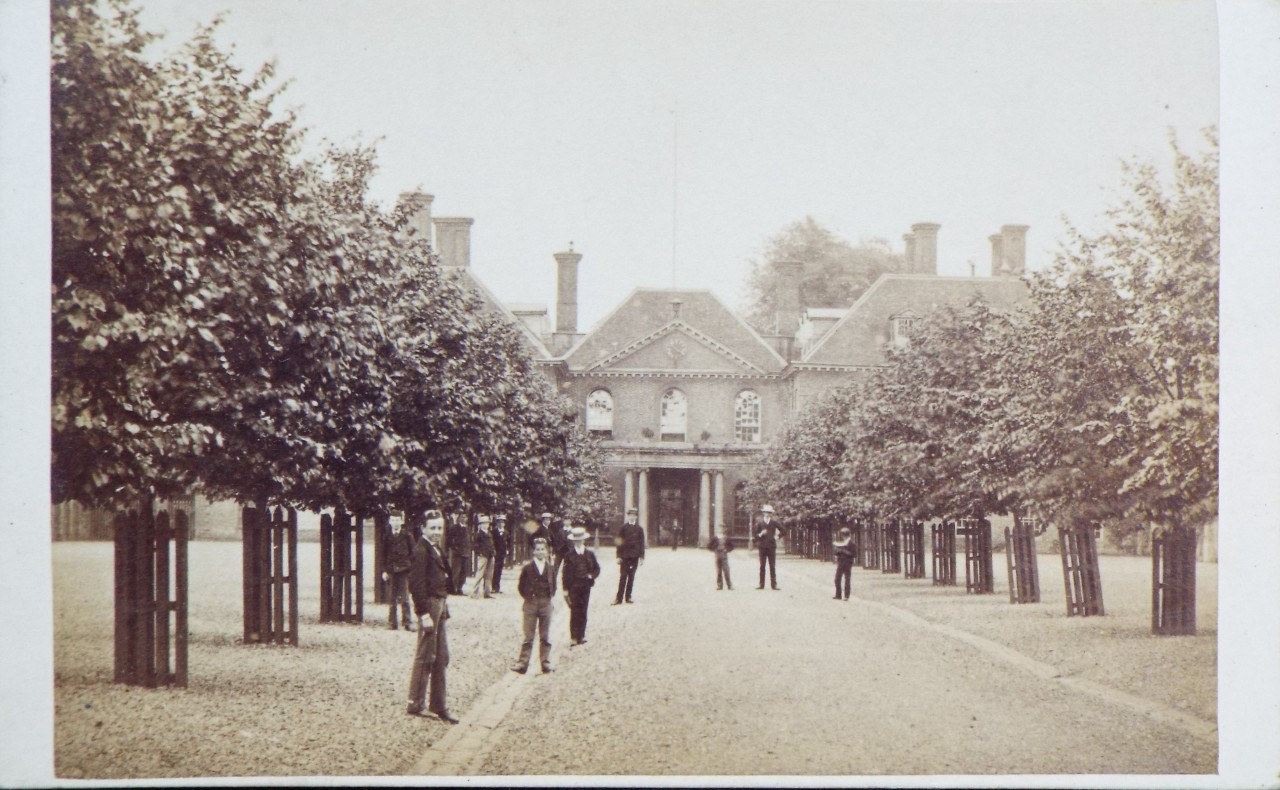
Marlborough College, c. 1891

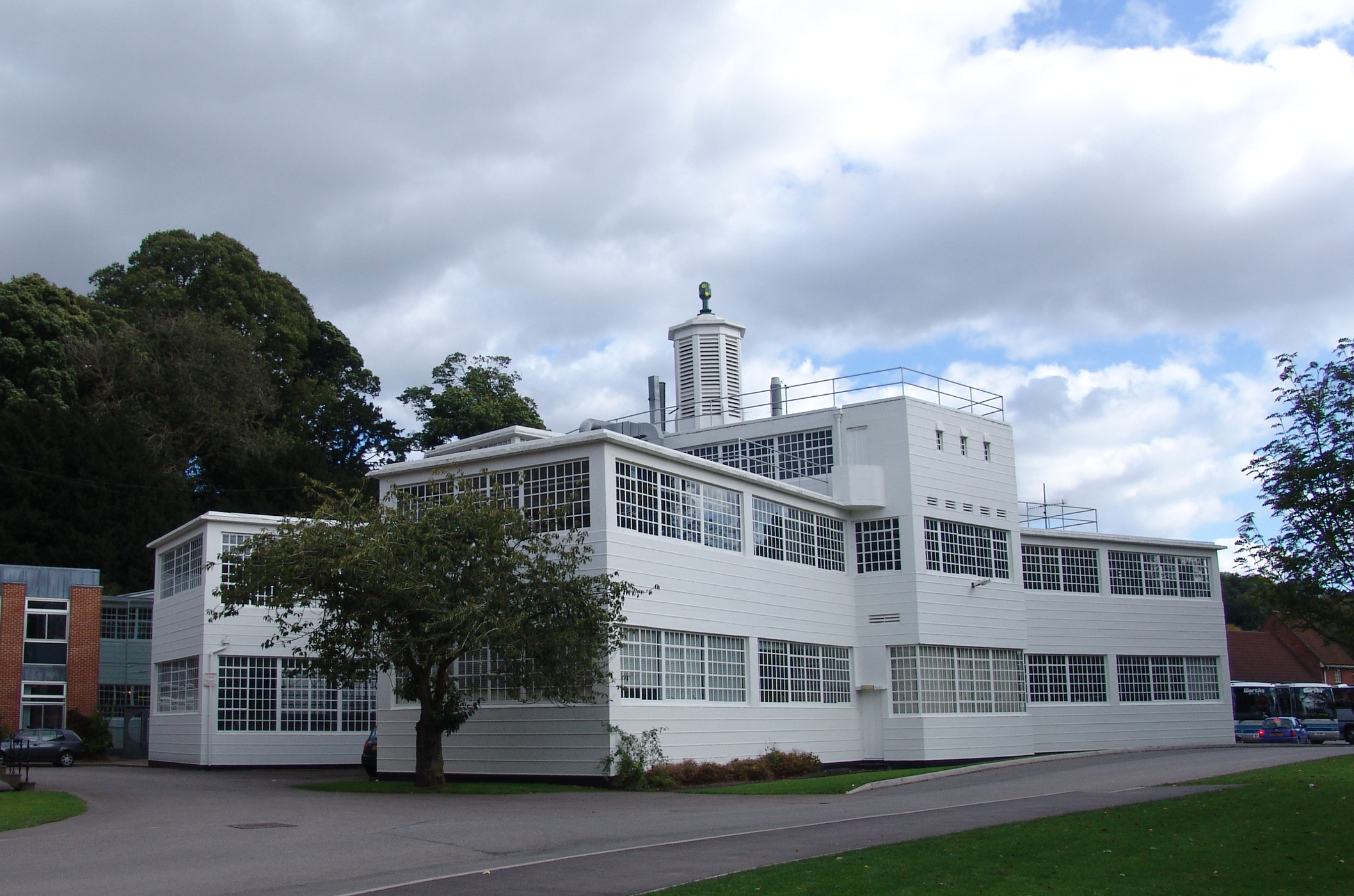
The listed Science Labs with the tree-covered Mound behind

Marlborough was, in 1968, the first major British independent boys' school to allow girls into the sixth form, setting a trend that many other schools followed. The school became fully co-educational in 1989, and made a major contribution to the School Mathematics Project (from 1961) alongside initiating the teaching of its Business Studies programme (from 1968). In 1963 a group of boys, led by the future political biographer Ben Pimlott, wrote a book, Marlborough, an open examination written by the boys, describing life at the boarding institute. The writer and television critic T. C. Worsley wrote about predatory old masters at the school in his critically acclaimed autobiography Flannelled Fool: A Slice of a Life in the Thirties.

In 2005, the school was one of fifty of the country's most prestigious independent schools which were found by the Office of Fair Trading to have run an illegal price-fixing cartel, exposed by The Times, which had allowed them to drive up fees for thousands of parents. Each school was required to pay a nominal penalty of £10,000, and all agreed to make ex-gratia payments totalling three million pounds into a trust designed to benefit pupils who attended the schools during the period in respect of which fee information was shared. Jean Scott, the head of the Independent Schools Council, said that independent schools had always been exempt from anti-cartel rules applied to business, were following a long-established procedure in sharing the information with each other, and were unaware of the change to the law (on which they had not been consulted). She wrote to John Vickers, the OFT director-general, saying, "They are not a group of businessmen meeting behind closed doors to fix the price of their products to the disadvantage of the consumer. They are schools that have quite openly continued to follow a long-established practice because they were unaware that the law had changed."

The school is a member of the G20 Schools group. Marlborough College Malaysia, a sister school, opened in Johor in 2012.

== Buildings ==
The college is built beside the Mound, at the site of a former Norman castle. No remains of the castle can be seen today, though the radiocarbon dating of core samples in the early 2010s indicated that the origins of the Mound date from 2400 BC. This is close to the dates established for Silbury Hill.

The main focus of the college is the Court, which is surrounded by buildings in a number of architectural styles. At the south end is the back of an early 18th-century mansion, later converted to a coaching inn, which was bought as the first building for the school. The main block of what now forms C House, it was built by Charles Seymour, 6th Duke of Somerset and is a Grade I listed building. Next to it are the old stables, now converted into boarding houses. The west side consists of the 1959 red brick dining hall, and a Victorian boarding house now converted to other purposes. The north west corner is dominated by its Victorian Gothic style chapel by the architects George Frederick Bodley and Thomas Garner, which has a collection of pre-Raphaelite style paintings by John Roddam Spencer Stanhope and stained glass by Old Marlburian William Morris.

The rest of the Court is surrounded by buildings in styles ranging from "Jacobethan" (a name coined by Old Marlburian Sir John Betjeman) to classical Georgian and Victorian. The latter, B house (now called B1), was (along with the College Chapel) designed by the Victorian architect Edward Blore, whose other works included the facade of Buckingham Palace (since remodelled) and the Vorontsovsky Palace in Alupka, Ukraine.

On the other side of the Mound is the science laboratory, built in 1933. It is an early example of shuttered concrete construction and was listed as a building of architectural significance in 1970.

== Houses ==
Pupils are assigned to one of the 16 houses upon entering the school, where they make their home for the duration of their studies, and compete against other houses in sporting olympiads.

The houses are divided between on-campus heritage sites – mostly gathered around the central court – and sites around the western side of Marlborough town. The older on-campus heritage houses are referred to by an alphanumeric title. Newer houses have been given names reflecting their location or commemorating a figure from the school's past.

=== House names ===
Boys In-College	Girls In-College	Mixed Out-College
B1	New Court	Summerfield
C1	Morris	Cotton
Turner	Ivy House	Littlefield
C3	Mill Mead	Preshute
Barton Hill	Elmhurst	
C2	Dancy	

When the college became fully co-educational in 1989, three girls' houses were opened – Morris, Elmhurst and Mill Mead; New Court was opened in 1991. Morris was moved in 1995 from A house to Field House, which had previously been occupied by B3 and C2. New houses were built to accommodate C3, which had previously shared C house with C1 (in 1989) and C2 (in 1992). In 2012, the college acquired the Ivy House Hotel in Marlborough High Street which opened as a girls' house in the autumn of that year.

== Railway locomotive ==
In 1933, the school lent its name to one of the steam locomotives in the Southern Railway's Schools class, which were named after English public schools. The locomotive bearing the school's name (no. 922, later 30922) was withdrawn in 1961.

== Masters ==
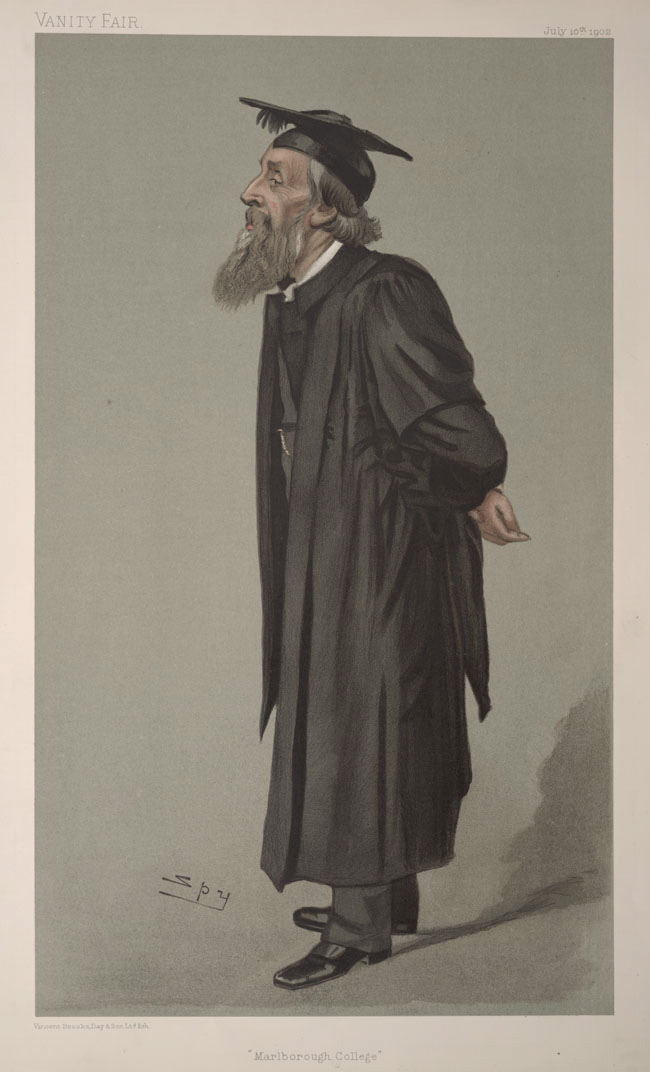
"Marlborough College". Caricature of George Charles Bell by Spy published in Vanity Fair in 1902.

- 1843–1851 Matthew Wilkinson
- 1852–1858 George Edward Lynch Cotton
- 1858–1870 George Granville Bradley
- 1871–1876 Frederick William Farrar
- 1876–1903 George Charles Bell
- 1903–1911 Frank Fletcher
- 1911–1916 St John Basil Wynne Willson
- 1916–1926 Cyril Norwood
- 1926–1939 George Charlewood Turner
- 1939–1952 Francis Melville Heywood
- 1952–1961 Thomas Ronald Garnett
- 1961–1972 John Christopher Dancy
- 1972–1986 Roger Wykeham Ellis
- 1986–1993 David Robert Cope
- 1993–2004 Edward John Humphrey Gould
- 2004–2012 Nicholas Alexander Sampson
- 2012–2018 Jonathan Leigh
- 2018– Louise Moelwyn-Hughes

== Other notable schoolmasters ==
- Stephen Borthwick, later head of Epsom College
- Peter Godfrey (choral conductor)
- Edwin Kempson (Everest mountaineer)

== Notable alumni ==
Former pupils include the Nobel laureate Sir Peter Medawar, Poet Laureate Sir John Betjeman, wartime poet Siegfried Sassoon, art historian and Soviet spy Anthony Blunt, writer Dick King-Smith, journalists Frank Gardner, James Mates, Tom Newton Dunn and Hugh Pym, businessman Simon Woodroffe, comedian Jack Whitehall, singers Nick Drake and Chris de Burgh, DJ and producer Frederick Gibson known as Fred Again, physician and broadcaster Phil Hammond, fashion moguls Amanda Harlech and Stella Tennant, and former socialite, convicted sex offender and founder of The TerraMar Project Ghislaine Maxwell.

Chancellor of the Exchequer Rab Butler, Home Secretary Henry Brooke, Baron Brooke of Cumnor, Archbishop of Canterbury Geoffrey Fisher, Olivia Grosvenor, Duchess of Westminster, and individuals from the British monarchy including Catherine, Princess of Wales and Princess Eugenie.

See List of Old Marlburians for other notable former pupils. Societies for former pupils include the Marlburian Club.

== Terms ==
There are three academic terms in the year:

- The Michaelmas Term, from early September to mid December (new boys, girls and lower-sixth candidates are now usually only admitted at the start of the Michaelmas Half);
- The Lent Term, from mid January to late March;
- The Summer Term, from late April to late June or early July.

== Facilities ==
=== The Memorial Hall ===
The Memorial Hall was built to commemorate the 749 Old Marlburians who were killed in World War I. Following World War II, the names of those killed in that war were added to a memorial panel in the entrance hall.

The hall is a semi-circular auditorium of stepped seats. There is a stage at the front. Below the seats with access from the outside rear are a number of music practice rooms. The façade of the hall towards the forecourt and road has two entrance lobbies linked together by eight stone columns. The forecourt is paved with stone.

The Hall holds about 800 people so can no longer be used for assemblies of the entire school. It is now most often used for concerts and theatrical productions where the whole school is not expected to attend.

=== The Chapel ===
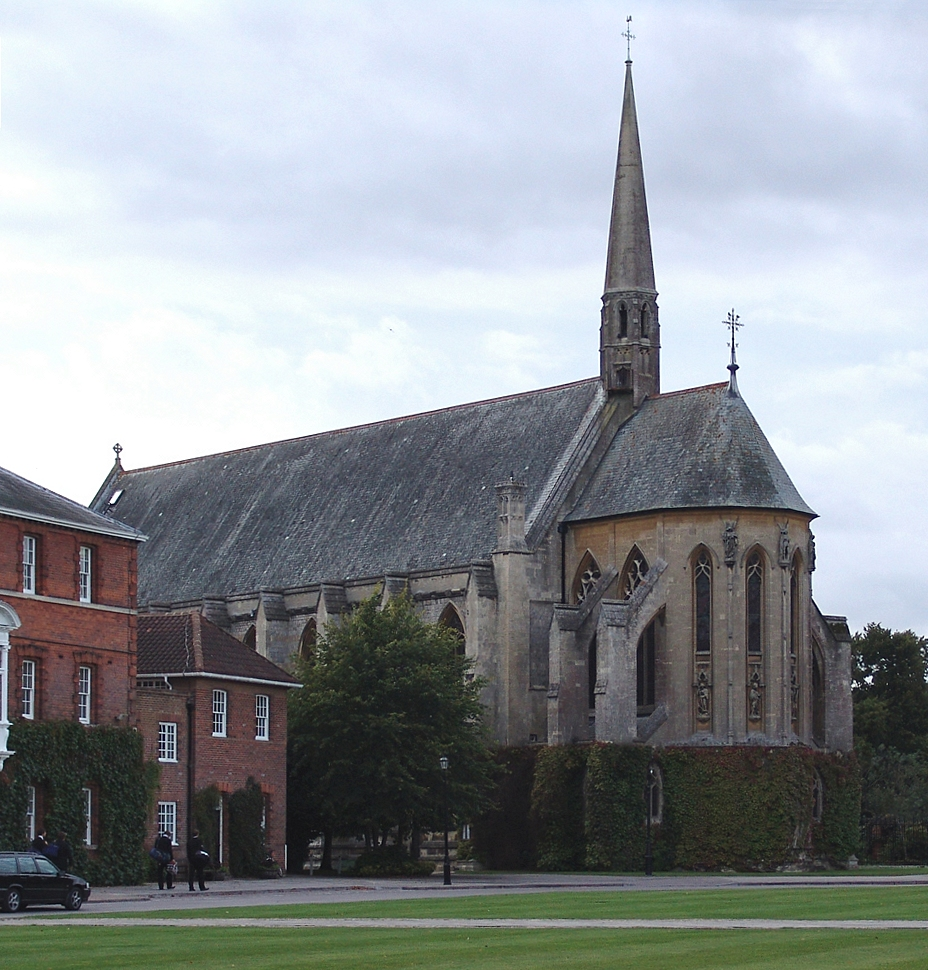
College Chapel

The current Chapel is the second to be built at the school. The first was opened in 1848 but by 1880 the school numbers had outgrown its space. After consideration of expanding the existing building, it was demolished in 1884 and a new Chapel was designed and built.

The new Chapel, designed in the Late Decorated Gothic style, was dedicated to St Michael and All Angels and was consecrated in 1886. The original colour scheme of greens and browns was much loved by Sir John Betjeman and there are twelve large Pre-Raphaelite murals by Spencer Stanhope which depict various Biblical scenes involving angels. Those on the north side show scenes from the Old Testament while the six on the south side are from the New Testament.

Two other artistic features are the Scholars' Window on the Chapel's south side. The work's creation was supervised in 1875 by Old Marlburian William Morris and designed by Edward Burne-Jones. Initially displayed in the original Chapel, the work was reinstated in the new Chapel c. 1885. A sculpture of "The Virgin and Child" by Eric Gill is near the west door. Sir Frank Brangwyn, who had been trained by Morris, produced murals for the school chapel of Christ's Hospital (1912–1923) and visited Marlborough College, particularly its chapel, on several occasions to deliver lectures and practical workshops to members of the college community. Brangwyn and Walthamstow Borough Council signed a trust deed in 1935 to set up the William Morris Gallery, and The William Morris Gallery and Brangwyn Gift opened to the public in October 1950.

In 2010, the Marlborough College Chapel was closed owing to structural defects. After being repaired, it was declared safe to use.

=== Music facilities and performance areas ===
All music halls and performance areas are fitted with soundproof windows which prevent sound from escaping, even while open, as well as walls engineered to prevent sound crossing at right angles. The floors of the centres also float on a bed of air, so as to maintain good soundproofing.

=== The Blackett Observatory ===
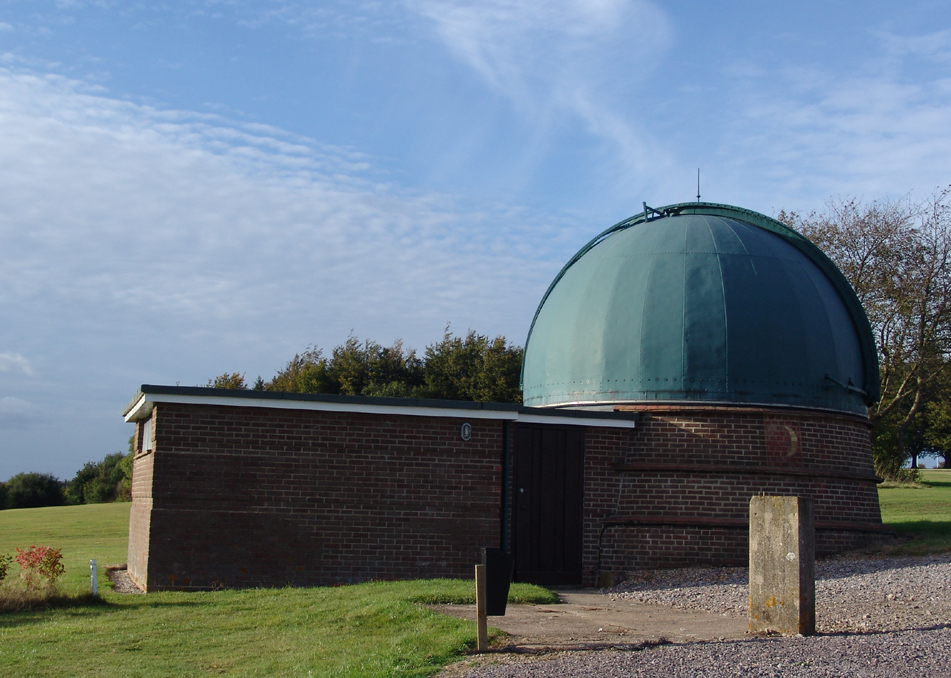
The Blackett Observatory

The Blackett Observatory houses a 10-inch-aperture (25-centimetre) Cooke refractor on a motorised equatorial mount. The telescope dates from 1860 and was used professionally at the Radcliffe Observatory at Oxford University. When that facility was relocated to South Africa in the 1930s, Sir Basil Blackett, a president of the Marlburian Club, raised the funds to purchase the telescope and have the observatory built on the college playing fields. It is used to teach astronomy and is also available to local astronomers.

=== Sports history and facilities ===
A fully operational army-only CCF detachment operates at the college under the supervision of a resident SSI (school staff instructor). Weekly parades take place at the parade ground adjacent to the armoury, with occasional off-campus activities, such as range-days or overnight exercises.

Next to the CCF parade ground is a six-lane .22 rifle range. Rifle shooting has had a long history at the college, with teams representing the school since 1862. By the 1890s, the "difficulty" of finding a replacement sport during the Easter term led to hockey matches being regularly played against Clifton College, with the sport consequently becoming popular with other public schools and sporting communities.

== See also ==
- The Heretick – a magazine published by students
- List of independent schools in the United Kingdom
- Education in the United Kingdom
- Marlborough College Malaysia
- Marlborough Mound
