= 1995 Ceredigion County Council election =

1995 Welsh local election

The first elections to the Ceredigion County Council were held on 4 May 1995. In the sense that the borders were identical, the election followed the 1991 election for Ceredigion District Council. It was followed by the 1999 election.

== Overview ==
As was the case with the previous authority, the Independents were the largest group with a number of councillors elected unopposed

== Boundaries ==
The boundaries were identical to those used since 1987 for elections to the previous Ceredigion District Council.

== Candidates ==
In addition to retiring members of the Ceredigion District Council a number of members of Dyfed County Council also sought election.

== Ward results ==
=== Aberaeron (one seat) ===
Aberaeron 1995
Party	Candidate	Votes	%	±%
Independent	R. Wyn Lewis*	470		
Plaid Cymru	T.D.G. Evans	231		
Independent	M.A. Richards	165		
Independent hold		Swing		

=== Aberporth (one seat) ===
Aberporth 1995
Party	Candidate	Votes	%	±%
Independent	William James Granville Varney*	unopposed		
Independent hold		Swing		

=== Aberystwyth East (two seats) ===
Aberystwyth East 1995
Party	Candidate	Votes	%	±%
Plaid Cymru	Hywel Griffiths Evans+*	554		
Plaid Cymru	Gareth Butler*	434		
Green	Julie Williams	109		
Liberal Democrats	Neil Ronald Diack	106		
Liberal Democrats	Martin Veart	93		
Plaid Cymru hold		Swing		
Plaid Cymru hold		Swing		

=== Aberystwyth North (two seats) ===
Aberystwyth North 1995
Party	Candidate	Votes	%	±%
Liberal Democrats	Edgar Carl Williams*	554		
Liberal Democrats	Robert Louis Griffin	340		
Plaid Cymru	Einion Gruffudd	291		
Independent	Mona Rachel Morris	286		
Plaid Cymru	Dafydd Ffredric Raw-Rees*	229		
Liberal Democrats hold		Swing		
Liberal Democrats hold		Swing		

=== Aberystwyth South (two seats) ===
Aberystwyth South 1995
Party	Candidate	Votes	%	±%
Independent	Llewelyn Goronwy Edwards*	864		
Independent	Gareth Ellis*	862		
Liberal Democrats	Graham Thomas Parry	207		
Plaid Cymru	Dilys Mary Parkin	112		
Liberal Democrats	Calvin John Onions	94		
Green	Sarah Margaret Scott	63		
Independent hold		Swing		
Independent hold		Swing		

=== Aberystwyth West (two seats) ===
Aberystwyth West 1995
Party	Candidate	Votes	%	±%
Liberal Democrats	Eric John Griffiths+	634		
Independent	Hywel Thomas Jones*	441		
Liberal Democrats	Carol Ann Kolczak*	265		
Plaid Cymru	Margaret Elin Jones	243		
Independent	Owen Henry Jones	188		
Green	Christopher Charles Busby	127		
Liberal Democrats hold		Swing		
Independent hold		Swing		

=== Beulah (one seat) ===
Beulah 1995
Party	Candidate	Votes	%	±%
Independent	John Elfed Davies*	unopposed		
Independent hold		Swing		

=== Borth (one seat) ===
Borth 1995
Party	Candidate	Votes	%	±%
Independent	William Thomas Kinsey Raw-Rees*	522		
Green	Jennifer Ann Edkins	283		
Independent hold		Swing		

=== Capel Dewi (one seat) ===
Capel Dewi 1995
Party	Candidate	Votes	%	±%
Independent	Thomas John Jones*	Unopposed		
Independent hold				

=== Cardigan (three seats) ===
Cardigan 1995
Party	Candidate	Votes	%	±%
Independent	Thomas John Adams-Lewis*	unopposed		
Liberal Democrats	D.M.B. Davies*	unopposed		
Liberal Democrats	Sandra Williams*	unopposed		
Independent hold		Swing		
Liberal Democrats hold		Swing		
Liberal Democrats gain from Independent		Swing		

=== Ceulanamaesmawr (one seat) ===
Ceulanamaesmawr 1995
Party	Candidate	Votes	%	±%
Plaid Cymru	Harry James	497		
Independent	John Rowland Davies*	424		
Plaid Cymru gain from Independent		Swing		

=== Ciliau Aeron (one seat) ===
Ciliau Aeron 1995
Party	Candidate	Votes	%	±%
Independent	Stanley Meredith Thomas*	unopposed		
Independent hold		Swing		

=== Faenor (one seat) ===
Faenor 1995
Party	Candidate	Votes	%	±%
Liberal Democrats	Peredur Wynne Eklund+*	559		
Labour	Thomas Elwyn Williams	319		
Plaid Cymru	Nona Tudor Evans	180		
Liberal Democrats hold		Swing		

=== Lampeter (two seats) ===
Lampeter 1995
Party	Candidate	Votes	%	±%
Labour	Robert George Harris+*	unopposed		
Liberal Democrats	David Doiran Evans	unopposed		
Labour hold		Swing		
Liberal Democrats hold		Swing		

=== Llanarth (one seat) ===
The sitting district councillor, elected as an Independent in 1991 but as an Alliance candidate in 1987 stood down. Rheinallt Evans, a county councillor since 1985, was defeated.

Llanarth 1995
Party	Candidate	Votes	%	±%
Liberal Democrats	Thomas Eurfyl Evans	446		
Plaid Cymru	John Rheinallt Evans+	200		
Liberal Democrats gain from Independent		Swing		

=== Llanbadarn Fawr (two seats) ===
Llanbadarn Fawr 1995
Party	Candidate	Votes	%	±%
Independent	John Richard Evans*	346		
Independent	William Irfon Griffiths*	329		
Plaid Cymru	Alun Geraint Cox	299		
Green	Timothy John Foster	189		
Independent hold		Swing		
Independent hold		Swing		

=== Llandyfriog (one seat) ===
Llandyfriog 1995
Party	Candidate	Votes	%	±%
Independent	Lyndon Lloyd Jones*	unopposed		
Independent hold		Swing		

=== Llandysiliogogo (one seat) ===
Llandysiliogogo 1995
Party	Candidate	Votes	%	±%
Independent	J.E. Evans*	509		
Plaid Cymru	D.I. Jones	299		
Independent hold		Swing		

=== Llandysul Town (one seat) ===
Llandysul Town 1995
Party	Candidate	Votes	%	±%
Independent	Evan John Keith Evans*	Unopposed		
Independent hold				

=== Llanfarian (one seat) ===
Llanfarian 1995
Party	Candidate	Votes	%	±%
Plaid Cymru	Alun Lloyd Jones*	359		
Liberal Democrats	Derwyn Robert Evans	192		
Plaid Cymru hold		Swing		

=== Llanfihangel Ystrad (one seat) ===
Llanfihangel Ystrad 1995
Party	Candidate	Votes	%	±%
Liberal Democrats	Huw Ceiriog Lloyd-Williams	512		
Plaid Cymru	J.B. Hughes	508		
Liberal Democrats gain from Independent		Swing		

=== Llangeitho (one seat) ===
Llangeitho 1995
Party	Candidate	Votes	%	±%
Liberal Democrats	Hannah Marion Jones*	unopposed		
Liberal Democrats hold		Swing		

=== Llangybi (one seat) ===
Llangybi 1995
Party	Candidate	Votes	%	±%
Independent	Johnny Williams*	unopposed		
Independent hold		Swing		

=== Llanrhystud (one seat) ===
Llanrhystud 1995
Party	Candidate	Votes	%	±%
Liberal Democrats	William Richard Edwards*	488		
Plaid Cymru	Elizabeth Mary Saunders Hughes	279		
Liberal Democrats hold		Swing		

=== Llansantffraed (one seat) ===
Llansantffraed 1995
Party	Candidate	Votes	%	±%
Plaid Cymru	Daniel Meurig James	503		
Independent	Tom Bleddyn Edwards	389		
Liberal Democrats	Philip Mark Simmons	153		
Plaid Cymru gain from Independent		Swing		

=== Llanwenog (one seat) ===
Llanwenog 1995
Party	Candidate	Votes	%	±%
Independent	David Alun James*	Unopposed		
Independent hold				

=== Lledrod (one seat) ===
Lledrod 1995
Party	Candidate	Votes	%	±%
Independent	David Lloyd Evans*	Unopposed		
Independent hold				

=== Melindwr (one seat) ===
Melindwr 1995
Party	Candidate	Votes	%	±%
Liberal Democrats	Fred Williams	468		
Plaid Cymru	Griffith Gwynfor Jones	392		
Liberal Democrats gain from Independent		Swing		

=== New Quay (one seat) ===
New Quay 1995
Party	Candidate	Votes	%	±%
Independent	Julian Raymond Evans	239		
Independent	Sarah Gillian Hopley	227		
Independent	J.D. Leworthy	54		
Independent hold		Swing		

=== Penbryn (one seat) ===
Penbryn 1995
Party	Candidate	Votes	%	±%
Independent	J. Geraint Jenkins*	617		
Anti Racialist	G. Hutton	55		
Independent hold		Swing		

=== Penparc (one seat) ===
Penparc 1995
Party	Candidate	Votes	%	±%
Independent	Thomas Haydn Lewis+*	unopposed		
Independent hold		Swing		

=== Tirymynach (one seat) ===
Tirymynach 1995
Party	Candidate	Votes	%	±%
Plaid Cymru	Wiliam Penri James+	472		
Independent	John Pryse Rees	237		
Plaid Cymru gain from Independent		Swing		

=== Trefeurig (one seat) ===
Trefeurig 1995
Party	Candidate	Votes	%	±%
Independent	Thomas Arthur Thomas*	Unopposed		
Independent hold				

=== Tregaron (one seat) ===
Tregaron 1995
Party	Candidate	Votes	%	±%
Independent	William Gethin Bennett*	499		
Plaid Cymru	James Douglas Kinnibrugh	164		
Independent hold		Swing		

=== Troedyraur (one seat) ===
Troedyraur 1995
Party	Candidate	Votes	%	±%
Independent	J.D. Thomas*	386		
Plaid Cymru	D.J. Bevan	222		
Independent hold		Swing		

=== Ystwyth one seat) ===
Ystwyth 1995
Party	Candidate	Votes	%	±%
Liberal Democrats	John David Rowland Jones*	677		
Green	Graham James Town	115		
Liberal Democrats hold		Swing		

== By-elections 1995-99 ==
=== Aberaeron 1996 ===
A by-election was held in the Aberaeron ward following the resignation of Independent councillor Wyn Lewis.

Aberaeron by-election, 20 June 1996
Party	Candidate	Votes	%	±%
Independent	Richard Emlyn Thomas	388	45.8	
Plaid Cymru		328	38.7	
Liberal Democrats		131	15.5	
Majority		60		
Turnout				
Registered electors				
Independent hold		Swing		

=== Llanfihangel Ystrad 1998 ===
A by-election was held in the Llanfihangel Ystrad ward following the death of Liberal Democrat councillor Huw Lloyd-Williams.

Llanfihangel Ystrad by-election, 25 June 1998
Party	Candidate	Votes	%	±%
Plaid Cymru	Evan Wynne Davies	570	57.6	
Liberal Democrats	Matthew Lewes Gee	420	42.4	
Majority		150		
Turnout				
Registered electors				
Plaid Cymru gain from Liberal Democrats		Swing		
