= Ceredigion District Council =

Welsh district council (1974–1996)

Coordinates: 52.23956°N 4.26638°W

Ceredigion
- District
- History
  - Created: 1 April 1974
  - Abolished: 31 March 1996
  - Succeeded by: Ceredigion County Council
  - HQ: Aberystwyth
- Contained within
  - County Council: Dyfed

Ceredigion District Council was one of six district-level authorities in the county of Dyfed, Wales, from 1974 until 1996. The district had an identical area to the pre-1974 administrative county of Cardiganshire. From its creation in 1974 the district used the name "Ceredigion" rather than "Cardiganshire", which had been used for the former county council. Further local government reorganisation in 1996 saw Dyfed County Council abolished and Ceredigion become a unitary authority, with the district council taking over county-level services to become Ceredigion County Council.

== History ==
The district of Ceredigion was created on 1 April 1974 under the Local Government Act 1972. It covered the administrative county of Cardiganshire, which was abolished at the same time. County-level functions passed to the new Dyfed County Council, which replaced Cardiganshire County Council, Carmarthenshire County Council and Pembrokeshire County Council. The new Ceredigion district replaced the previous nine district-level authorities in Cardiganshire:

- Aberaeron Rural District
- Aberaeron Urban District
- Aberystwyth Municipal Borough
- Aberystwyth Rural District
- Cardigan Municipal Borough
- Lampeter Municipal Borough
- New Quay Urban District
- Teifiside Rural District
- Tregaron Rural District

The district was reconstituted under the Local Government (Wales) Act 1994, taking over county-level functions in its area from Dyfed County Council, which was abolished, on 1 April 1996. The 1994 act specified that the new authority was to have both an English and a Welsh name: Cardiganshire / Sir Aberteifi. The new authority was elected in 1995, but acted as a shadow authority alongside the outgoing district and county councils until the new arrangements took effect the following year. During that time, the shadow authority requested a change of name from Cardiganshire / Sir Aberteifi to Ceredigion for both languages. The government confirmed the change with effect from 2 April 1996, one day after the new council came into being.

== Political control ==
The first election to the council was held in 1973, initially operating as a shadow authority before coming into its powers on 1 April 1974. A majority of the seats on the council were held by independents throughout the council's existence.

Party in control	Years
Independent	1974–1996

== Council elections ==
- 1973 Ceredigion District Council election
- 1976 Ceredigion District Council election
- 1979 Ceredigion District Council election
- 1983 Ceredigion District Council election
- 1987 Ceredigion District Council election
- 1991 Ceredigion District Council election

== Premises ==
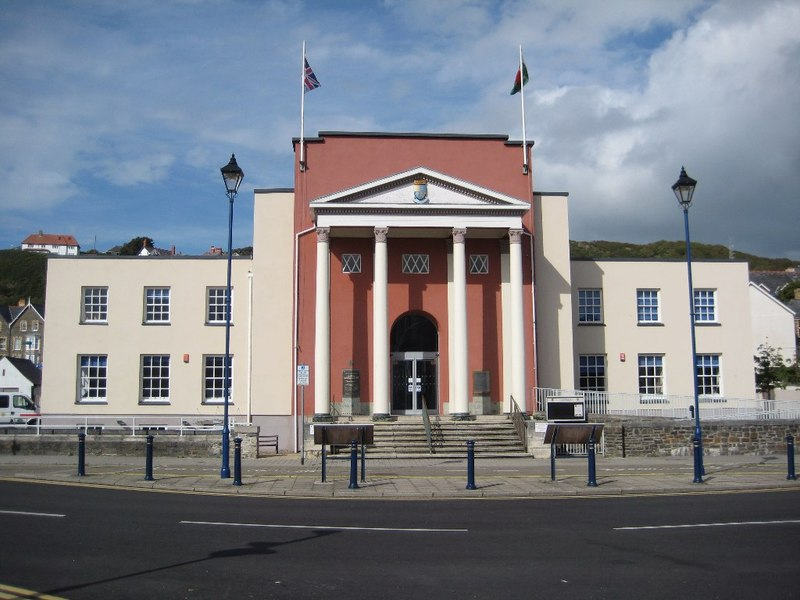
Aberystwyth Town Hall

The council maintained a number of offices around the district, mostly inherited from its predecessor authorities. Although the district covered the same area as the former Cardiganshire County Council, it was successor authority to the former district-level authorities, not the county council. As such, the former county council's main offices at Swyddfa'r Sir in Aberystwyth passed to Dyfed County Council rather than the new district council. The district council's main office was Aberystwyth Town Hall which had been built in 1962 for the former Aberystwyth Borough Council. In the early 1990s the council built itself a new office at Penmorfa in Aberaeron, which initially served as a secondary office. Penmorfa subsequently became the headquarters for the new Ceredigion County Council in 1996.
