= 1999 Ceredigion County Council election =

1999 Welsh local election

The second election to Ceredigion County Council was held on 6 May 1999. It was preceded by the 1995 election and followed by the 2004 election.

== Overview ==
Once again, the Independents were the largest group with a number of councillors elected unopposed

Thirty members of the original Council elected in 1995 were again returned.

Fourteen candidates were returned unopposed. Thirteen were sitting Independent or Liberal Democrat councilors; the only exception being Cen Llwyd, who was returned for Plaid Cymru in Llandysiliogogo ward, replacing a retiring Independent.

== Boundaries ==
There were no boundary changes.

== Candidates ==
Most of the retiring members sought re-election.

== Results by ward ==
=== Aberaeron (one seat) ===
Aberaeron 1999
Party	Candidate	Votes	%	±%
Independent	Richard Emlyn Thomas*	557		
Liberal Democrats	Deanne M. Hartwell-Jones	243		
Independent hold		Swing		

=== Aberporth (one seat) ===
Aberporth 1999
Party	Candidate	Votes	%	±%
Independent	William James Granville Varney*	Unopposed		
Independent hold		Swing		

=== Aberystwyth East (two seats) ===
Aberystwyth East 1999
Party	Candidate	Votes	%	±%
Plaid Cymru	Hywel Griffiths Evans*	691		
Plaid Cymru	Simon Thomas	552		
Liberal Democrats	Michael John Woods	244		
Plaid Cymru hold		Swing		
Plaid Cymru hold		Swing		

=== Aberystwyth North (two seats) ===
Aberystwyth North 1999
Party	Candidate	Votes	%	±%
Liberal Democrats	Edgar Carl Williams*	493		
Plaid Cymru	Llinos M. Roberts-Young	418		
Independent	Mona Rachel Morris	416		
Plaid Cymru	Jacqueline Mary Taylor	344		
Independent	I. Pidgeon	149		
Liberal Democrats hold		Swing		
Plaid Cymru gain from Liberal Democrats		Swing		

=== Aberystwyth South (two seats) ===
Aberystwyth South 1999
Party	Candidate	Votes	%	±%
Independent	Llewellyn Goronwy Edwards*	696		
Independent	Gareth Ellis*	606		
Socialist	Griffith Eric Hughes	397		
Plaid Cymru	Paul Cornelius Davies	223		
Labour	Dylan Paul Lewis	190		
Liberal Democrats	Graham Thomas Parry	136		
Independent hold		Swing		
Independent hold		Swing		

=== Aberystwyth West (two seats) ===
Aberystwyth West 1999
Party	Candidate	Votes	%	±%
Liberal Democrats	Eric John Griffiths*	754		
Independent	Hywel Thomas Jones*	408		
Plaid Cymru	Alun John Wiliams	357		
Liberal Democrats	Carol Ann Kolczak	320		
Labour	Mark Richard Franchi	150		
Liberal Democrats hold		Swing		
Independent hold		Swing		

=== Beulah (one seat) ===
Beulah 1999
Party	Candidate	Votes	%	±%
Independent	John Elfed Davies*	676		
Independent	Colin Sinclair	138		
Independent hold		Swing		

=== Borth (one seat) ===
Borth 1999
Party	Candidate	Votes	%	±%
Independent	William Thomas Kinsey Raw-Rees*	632		
Liberal Democrats	David Peter Shankland	173		
Independent hold		Swing		

=== Capel Dewi (one seat) ===
Capel Dewi 1999
Party	Candidate	Votes	%	±%
Independent	Thomas John Jones*	Unopposed		
Independent hold		Swing		

=== Cardigan (three seats) ===
John Adams-Lewis was elected as an Independent in 1995.

Cardigan 1999
Party	Candidate	Votes	%	±%
Plaid Cymru	Thomas John Adams-Lewis*	1,021		
Plaid Cymru	Trevor Thomas Griffiths	810		
Independent	Sarah Mary Morris	805		
Independent	John Bertram Evans	645		
Plaid Cymru	Glen Kelsall Johnson	473		
Liberal Democrats	Julian S. Beynon-Lewis	303		
Plaid Cymru gain from Liberal Democrats		Swing		
Plaid Cymru gain from Liberal Democrats		Swing		
Independent hold		Swing		

=== Ceulanamaesmawr (one seat) ===
Ceulanamaesmawr 1999
Party	Candidate	Votes	%	±%
Plaid Cymru	Ellen Elizabeth ap Gwynn	583		
Independent	Dafydd Ffredric Raw-Rees	297		
Plaid Cymru hold		Swing		

=== Ciliau Aeron (one seat) ===
Ciliau Aeron 1999
Party	Candidate	Votes	%	±%
Independent	Stanley Meredith Thomas*	Unopposed		
Independent hold		Swing		

=== Faenor (one seat) ===
Faenor 1999
Party	Candidate	Votes	%	±%
Liberal Democrats	Peredur Wynne Eklund*	Unopposed		
Liberal Democrats hold		Swing		

=== Lampeter (two seats) ===
Lampeter 1999
Party	Candidate	Votes	%	±%
Labour	Robert George Harris*	681		
Independent	John Ivor Williams	428		
Independent	Carol Ramaya	382		
Liberal Democrats	David Doiran Evans*	314		
Plaid Cymru	Robert Phillips	304		
Labour hold		Swing		
Independent gain from Liberal Democrats		Swing		

=== Llanarth (one seat) ===
Llanarth 1999
Party	Candidate	Votes	%	±%
Liberal Democrats	Thomas Eurfyl Evans*	Unopposed		
Liberal Democrats hold		Swing		

=== Llanbadarn Fawr (two seats) ===
Plaid Cymru had won a seat following the death of a previous Independent councillor.

Llanbadarn Fawr 1999
Party	Candidate	Votes	%	±%
Independent	Benjamin Lewis Davies	478		
Plaid Cymru	Gwydion Heini Gruffudd	393		
Liberal Democrats	Ian Rees	368		
Liberal Democrats	John Lodwick Davies	244		
Independent hold		Swing		
Plaid Cymru hold		Swing		

=== Llandyfriog (one seat) ===
Llandyfriog 1999
Party	Candidate	Votes	%	±%
Independent	Lyndon Lloyd Jones*	Unopposed		
Independent hold		Swing		

=== Llandysiliogogo (one seat) ===
Llandysiliogogo 1999
Party	Candidate	Votes	%	±%
Plaid Cymru	Cen Llwyd	Unopposed		
Plaid Cymru gain from Independent		Swing		

=== Llandysul Town (one seat) ===
Llandysul Town 1999
Party	Candidate	Votes	%	±%
Independent	Evan John Keith Evans*	417		
Plaid Cymru	David Graham Evans	369		
Independent hold		Swing		

=== Llanfarian (one seat) ===
Llanfarian 1999
Party	Candidate	Votes	%	±%
Plaid Cymru	Alun Lloyd Jones*	564		
Liberal Democrats	Robert A. Coleman	115		
Plaid Cymru hold		Swing		

=== Llanfihangel Ystrad (one seat) ===
Plaid Cymru had won the seat at a by-election

Llanfihangel Ystrad 1999
Party	Candidate	Votes	%	±%
Plaid Cymru	Evan Wynne Davies	663		
Liberal Democrats	Matthew Lewes Gee	433		
Plaid Cymru hold		Swing		

=== Llangeitho (one seat) ===
Llangeitho 1999
Party	Candidate	Votes	%	±%
Independent	David John Evans	609		
Liberal Democrats	John Meurig Hughes	154		
Independent gain from Liberal Democrats		Swing		

=== Llangybi (one seat) ===
Llangybi 1999
Party	Candidate	Votes	%	±%
Plaid Cymru	John Timothy Odwyn Davies	426		
Independent	George Gwynne Gibbons	194		
Liberal Democrats	Jan Sutton	104		
Plaid Cymru gain from Independent		Swing		

=== Llanrhystud (one seat) ===
Llanrhystud 1999
Party	Candidate	Votes	%	±%
Liberal Democrats	William Richard Edwards*	Unopposed		
Liberal Democrats hold		Swing		

=== Llansantffraed (one seat) ===
Llansantffraed 1999
Party	Candidate	Votes	%	±%
Plaid Cymru	Daniel Meurig James*	578		
Independent	Lodwick Lloyd	382		
Liberal Democrats	Thomas Leslie Lewis	240		
Plaid Cymru hold		Swing		

=== Llanwenog (one seat) ===
Llanwenog 1999
Party	Candidate	Votes	%	±%
Plaid Cymru	Samuel Haydn Richards	584		
Independent	David Alun James*	404		
Plaid Cymru gain from Independent		Swing		

=== Lledrod (one seat) ===
Lledrod 1999
Party	Candidate	Votes	%	±%
Independent	David Lloyd Evans*	670		
Plaid Cymru	Gwilym ab Ioan	351		
Liberal Democrats	Robert Edward Allen	81		
Independent hold		Swing		

=== Melindwr (one seat) ===
Melindwr 1999
Party	Candidate	Votes	%	±%
Liberal Democrats	Fred Williams*	Unopposed		
Liberal Democrats hold		Swing		

=== New Quay (one seat) ===
New Quay 1999
Party	Candidate	Votes	%	±%
Independent	Sarah Gillian Hopley	194		
Plaid Cymru	John Cadwallader Price	193		
Independent	Julian Raymond Evans*	166		
Independent hold		Swing		

=== Penbryn (one seat) ===
Penbryn 1999
Party	Candidate	Votes	%	±%
Independent	J. Geraint Jenkins*	Unopposed		
Independent hold		Swing		

=== Penparc (one seat) ===
Penparc 1999
Party	Candidate	Votes	%	±%
Independent	Thomas Haydn Lewis*	Unopposed		
Independent hold		Swing		

=== Tirymynach (one seat) ===
Tirymynach 1999
Party	Candidate	Votes	%	±%
Plaid Cymru	William Penri James*	618		
Liberal Democrats	Alexander James Dauncey	248		
Plaid Cymru hold		Swing		

=== Trefeurig (one seat) ===
Trefeurig 1999
Party	Candidate	Votes	%	±%
Independent	Thomas Arthur Thomas*	Unopposed		
Independent hold		Swing		

=== Tregaron (one seat) ===
Tregaron 1999
Party	Candidate	Votes	%	±%
Independent	William Gethin Bennett*	499		
Plaid Cymru	Margaret Mary Williams	207		
Independent hold		Swing		

=== Troedyraur (one seat) ===
Troedyraur 1999
Party	Candidate	Votes	%	±%
Independent	John David Thomas*	Unopposed		
Independent hold		Swing		

=== Ystwyth (one seat) ===
Ystwyth 1999
Party	Candidate	Votes	%	±%
Liberal Democrats	John David Rowland Jones*	Unopposed		
Liberal Democrats hold				

== By-elections 1999-2004 ==
=== Aberystwyth East 2000 ===
A by-election was held in the Aberystwyth East ward following the resignation of Plaid Cymru councillor Simon Thomas, who was elected MP for Ceredigion and Pembroke North at a by-election earlier that year.

Aberystwyth East by-election, 20 June 2000
Party	Candidate	Votes	%	±%
Plaid Cymru	Alun John Williams	367	51.3	
Liberal Democrats		279	39.0	
Conservative	Adrian Robson	69	9.7	
Majority				
Turnout				
Registered electors				
Plaid Cymru hold		Swing		

=== Borth 2001 ===
A by-election was held in the Borth ward on 29 March 2001 following the death of Tom Raw-Rees. The seat was held by an Independent candidate.

Borth by-election 2001
Party	Candidate	Votes	%	±%
Independent	Raymond Quant	524	69.7	−8.8
Plaid Cymru	Arthur Dafis	147	19.5	+19.5
Liberal Democrats		81	10.8	−10.7
Majority		377	50.2	−6.8
Turnout		752	48%	−1.9
Registered electors				
Independent hold		Swing	-14.15	

=== Aberporth 2001 ===
Aberporth by-election, 11 October 2001
Party	Candidate	Votes	%	±%
Liberal Democrats	Elfyn Owen Rees	336	51.9	
Plaid Cymru		311	48.1	
Majority				
Turnout				
Registered electors				
Liberal Democrats gain from Independent		Swing		

=== Llanbadarn Fawr 2001 ===
A by-election was held in the Llanbadarn Fawr ward following the resignation of Plaid Cymru councillor Gwydion Gruffudd.

Llanbadarn Fawr by-election, 11 October 2001
Party	Candidate	Votes	%	±%
Plaid Cymru		338	57.0	
Liberal Democrats		255	43.0	
Majority				
Turnout				
Registered electors				
Plaid Cymru hold		Swing		

=== Cardigan 2002 ===
A by-election was held in the Cardigan ward following the resignation of Plaid Cymru councillor Trevor Griffiths.

Cardigan by-election, 11 July 2002
Party	Candidate	Votes	%	±%
Independent	Alan Wilson	859	60.8	
Plaid Cymru		341	24.2	
Labour		128	9.1	
Liberal Democrats		84	5.9	
Majority				
Turnout				
Registered electors				
Independent gain from Plaid Cymru		Swing		
