= 1991 Ceredigion District Council election =

1991 Welsh local election

An election to Ceredigion District Council was held in May 1991. It was preceded by the 1987 election and followed, after local government reorganization, by the first election to Ceredigion County Council in 1995. On the same day there were elections to the other district local authorities and community councils in Wales.

== Overview ==
The Independents remained the largest group with a number of councillors elected unopposed. The uncontested wards were mainly in rural areas. However, some wards were keenly contested, including Cardigan.

== Results ==
=== Aberaeron (one seat) ===
Aberaeron 1991
Party	Candidate	Votes	%	±%
Independent	Wyn Lewis	unopposed		
Independent hold				

=== Aberporth (one seat) ===
Aberporth 1991
Party	Candidate	Votes	%	±%
Independent	William James Granville Varney*	unopposed		
Independent hold				

=== Aberystwyth East (two seats) ===
Aberystwyth East 1991
Party	Candidate	Votes	%	±%
Plaid Cymru	Hywel Griffiths Evans*	588		
Plaid Cymru	Gareth Butler*	395		
Liberal Democrats	Nicholas Bennett	278		
Plaid Cymru hold		Swing		
Plaid Cymru hold		Swing		

=== Aberystwyth North (two seats) ===
Aberystwyth North 1991
Party	Candidate	Votes	%	±%
Liberal Democrats	M. Jones*	651		
Liberal Democrats	Ceredig Jones*	507		
Independent	Mona Rachel Morris	428		
Liberal Democrats hold		Swing		
Liberal Democrats hold		Swing		

=== Aberystwyth South (two seats) ===
Both successful candidates had previously served as SDP councillors but did not join the Liberal Democrats.

Aberystwyth South 1991
Party	Candidate	Votes	%	±%
Independent	Llewellyn Goronwy Edwards*	886		
Independent	Gareth Ellis	687		
Labour	C.H. Evans*	499		
Liberal Democrats	P. Roberts	163		
Green	A. Bowden	125		
Independent hold		Swing		
Independent gain from Labour		Swing		

=== Aberystwyth West (two seats) ===
Aberystwyth West 1991
Party	Candidate	Votes	%	±%
Independent	Hywel Thomas Jones	490		
Liberal Democrats	Carol Ann Kolczak	377		
Independent	Owen Henry Jones	374		
Plaid Cymru	Simon Thomas	280		
Independent	Keith Morris	240		
Independent gain from Labour		Swing		
Liberal Democrats gain from Plaid Cymru		Swing		

=== Beulah (one seat) ===
Beulah 1991
Party	Candidate	Votes	%	±%
Independent	John Elfed Davies*	372		
Independent	J.C.L. Evans	364		
Independent	L.H.R. Patrick	170		
Independent hold		Swing		

=== Borth (one seat) ===
Borth 1991
Party	Candidate	Votes	%	±%
Independent	William Thomas Kinsey Raw-Rees*	671	74.8	
Labour	C.I. Campbell	226	25.2	
Independent hold		Swing		

=== Capel Dewi (one seat) ===
Capel Dewi 1991
Party	Candidate	Votes	%	±%
Independent	Thomas John Jones*	unopposed		
Independent hold				

=== Cardigan (three seats) ===
Cardigan 1991
Party	Candidate	Votes	%	±%
Independent	Sandra Williams*	1,342		
Independent	Thomas John Adams-Lewis	1,311		
Independent	John Bertram Evans*	971		
Independent	Tomos Melfydd George	689		
Independent	Barbara Myers	472		
Independent hold		Swing		
Independent gain from Liberal		Swing		
Independent hold		Swing		

=== Ceulanamaesmawr (one seat) ===
Ceulanamaesmawr 1991
Party	Candidate	Votes	%	±%
Independent	John Rowland Davies*	Unopposed		
Independent hold				

=== Ciliau Aeron (one seat) ===
Stanley Meredith Thomas had been elected at a by-election following the death of the previous member.

Ciliau Aeron 1991
Party	Candidate	Votes	%	±%
Independent	Stanley Meredith Thomas*	unopposed		
Independent hold				

=== Faenor (one seat) ===
Faenor 1991
Party	Candidate	Votes	%	±%
Liberal Democrats	Peredur Wynne Eklund*	unopposed		
Liberal Democrats hold				

=== Lampeter (two seats) ===
Lampeter 1991
Party	Candidate	Votes	%	±%
Labour	Robert George Harris	1,003		
Liberal Democrats	Cecilia P. Barton*	636		
Independent	J.R. Evans*	628		
Labour gain from Independent		Swing		
Liberal Democrats hold		Swing		

=== Llanarth (one seat) ===
Thomas had stood as an Alliance candidate in 1987

Llanarth 1991
Party	Candidate	Votes	%	±%
Independent	Alan Thomas*	unopposed		
Independent gain from Alliance				

=== Llanbadarn Fawr (two seats) ===
Llanbadarn Fawr 1991
Party	Candidate	Votes	%	±%
Independent	John Richard Evans*	Unopposed		
Independent	William Irfon Grifiths	Unopposed		
Independent hold				
Independent gain from Alliance				

=== Llandyfriog (one seat) ===
Llandyfriog 1991
Party	Candidate	Votes	%	±%
Independent	Lyndon Lloyd Jones*	unopposed		
Independent hold				

=== Llandysiliogogo (one seat) ===
Llandysiliogogo 1991
Party	Candidate	Votes	%	±%
Independent	J.E. Evans*	603		
Independent	R. Smith	252		
Independent hold		Swing		

=== Llandysul Town (one seat) ===
Llandysul Town 1991
Party	Candidate	Votes	%	±%
Independent	Evan John Keith Evans*	Unopposed		
Independent hold				

=== Llanfarian (one seat) ===
Llanfarian 1991
Party	Candidate	Votes	%	±%
Plaid Cymru	Alun Lloyd Jones	287	57.3	
Independent	Derwyn Robert Evans	214	42.7	
Plaid Cymru gain from Liberal		Swing		

=== Llanfihangel Ystrad (one seat) ===
Jones stood as a Liberal in 1987

Llanfihangel Ystrad 1991
Party	Candidate	Votes	%	±%
Independent	W.A. Jones*	unopposed		
Independent gain from Liberal				

=== Llangeitho (one seat) ===
Llangeitho 1991
Party	Candidate	Votes	%	±%
Liberal	Hannah Marion Jones*	unopposed		
Liberal hold				

=== Llangybi (one seat) ===
Llangybi 1991
Party	Candidate	Votes	%	±%
Independent	Johnny Williams*	unopposed		
Independent hold				

=== Llanrhystud (one seat) ===
Llanrhystud 1991
Party	Candidate	Votes	%	±%
Liberal Democrats	William Richard Edwards*	392	50.8	
Independent	E.M. Jones	379	49.2	
Liberal Democrats hold		Swing		

=== Llansantffraed (one seat) ===
Llansantffraed 1991
Party	Candidate	Votes	%	±%
Independent	L. Lloyd*	unopposed		
Independent hold				

=== Llanwenog (one seat) ===
Llanwenog 1991
Party	Candidate	Votes	%	±%
Independent	David Alun James*	Unopposed		
Independent hold				

=== Lledrod (one seat) ===
Lledrod 1991
Party	Candidate	Votes	%	±%
Liberal	David Lloyd Evans	unopposed		
Independent hold				

=== Melindwr (one seat) ===
Melindwr 1991
Party	Candidate	Votes	%	±%
Independent	E.H. Evans*	unopposed		
Independent hold				

=== New Quay (one seat) ===
New Quay 1991
Party	Candidate	Votes	%	±%
Independent	I.C. Pursey*	278		
Independent	K.G. Young	195		
Independent hold		Swing		

=== Penbryn (one seat) ===
Penbryn 1991
Party	Candidate	Votes	%	±%
Liberal	E.T. Jenner*	533		
Plaid Cymru	Ian ap Dewi	392		
Independent	G. Hutton	63		
Liberal hold		Swing		

=== Penparc (one seat) ===
Penparc 1991
Party	Candidate	Votes	%	±%
Independent	T. Haydn Lewis*	771		
Plaid Cymru	Islwyn Iago	261		
Independent hold		Swing		

=== Tirymynach (one seat) ===
The sitting Plaid Cymru councilor failed to submit a valid nomination.

Tirymynach 1991
Party	Candidate	Votes	%	±%
Independent	Dafydd F. Raw-Rees	unopposed		
Independent gain from Plaid Cymru				

=== Trefeurig (one seat) ===
Trefeurig 1991
Party	Candidate	Votes	%	±%
Independent	T.A. Thomas*	unopposed		
Independent hold				

=== Tregaron (one seat) ===
Tregaron 1991
Party	Candidate	Votes	%	±%
Independent	W.G. Bennett*	unopposed		
Independent hold				

=== Troedyraur (one seat) ===
Troedyraur 1991
Party	Candidate	Votes	%	±%
Independent	J.D. Thomas*	unopposed		
Independent hold				

=== Ystwyth one seat) ===
Ystwyth 1991
Party	Candidate	Votes	%	±%
Liberal Democrats	J.D.R. Jones*	unopposed		
Liberal Democrats hold				
