= Geraint Jenkins =

Geraint Jenkins may refer to:

- J. Geraint Jenkins (1929–2009), Welsh maritime historian and historian of rural crafts
- Geraint H. Jenkins (1946–2025), historian of Wales and the Welsh language
