= Welsh Maritime Historical Studies =

The Institute of Welsh Maritime Historical Studies (otherwise known as Morol) was established in 2005 in order to raise awareness of Welsh maritime history and heritage. The society was founded by maritime author Robin Evans. It also aims to encourage the deposition of maritime related sources to the care of relevant archives, libraries or museums.

The society has published many books including:

- Terry Davies, Borth: A Maritime History (2009) ISBN 9781845241537
- Aled Eames, Ships and Seamen of Anglesey 1558–1918 - Studies in Local and Maritime History ISBN 9781845273521

The Patron is Lord Dafydd Elis-Thomas and First Honorary President is J. Geraint Jenkins.
