= 2022 Ceredigion County Council election =

2022 Welsh local government election

- 5 May 2022

All 38 (previously 42) seats to Ceredigion County Council 20 seats needed for a majority

	First party	Second party	Third party
Leader	Bryan Davies		Ceredig Davies
Party	Plaid Cymru	Independent	Liberal Democrats
Leader's seat	Llannarth		Did not contest
Last election	20	13	8
Seats won	20	9	7
Seat change	0	▼4	▼1
	Fourth party	Fifth party
Leader	Hag Harris	Gwyn Wigley Evans
Party	Labour	Gwlad
Leader's seat	Lampeter	Llanrhystyd
Last election	1	N/A
Seats won	1	1
Seat change	0	▲1
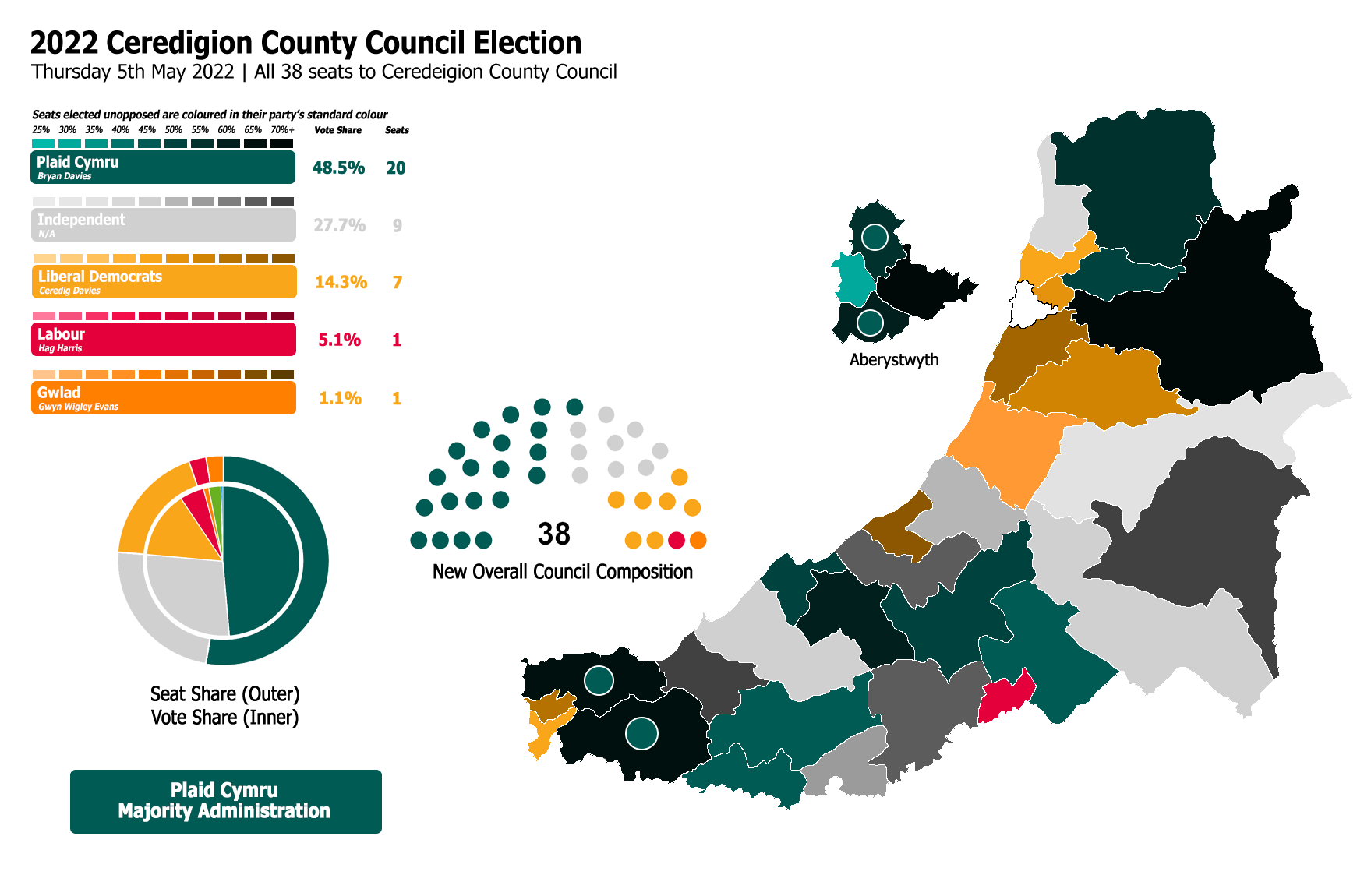
- Map showing the results of the 2022 Ceredigion County Council elections.
Council control before election
No overall control
Plaid Cymru and Independent coalition
Council control after election
Plaid Cymru
Plaid Cymru

The 2022 Ceredigion County Council election took place on 5 May 2022 to elect 38 members to Ceredigion Council. On the same day, elections were held to the other 21 local authorities and to community councils in Wales as part of the 2022 Welsh local elections. The previous all-council election took place in May 2017 and future elections will take place every five years.

== Background ==
Council elections in Wales were originally scheduled for May 2021, but were delayed to avoid a conflict with the 2021 Senedd election. The frequency of the elections was also increased from 4 years to five years to avoid future clashes, meaning (after 2022) the next council election is expected in 2027.

The number of councillors was decreased by 4 after the Local Democracy and Boundary Commission for Wales recommended the change in a report in May 2019. The number of wards was also decreased to 34 from 40.

Plaid Cymru groups in conjunction with Independent group had been in control of the council since 2012. Ellen ap Gwynn had been the leader of the council and leader of the Plaid Cymru group in the council since 2012, but she stepped back from that role after the elections. Bryan Davies, the County Councillor for Llannarth was chosen as the successor of ap Gwynn and leader of the Plaid Cymru group.

== Ward Changes ==
In August 2021 Welsh Government accepted a number of ward change proposals by the Local Democracy and Boundary Commission for Wales, with slight modifications on Welsh language names for some wards. These took effect from the 2022 council election. The changes gave a better parity of representation. 4 wards; Aberystwyth Penparcau, Aberystwyth Morlais a Glais, Beulah and Llangoedmor and Aberporth and Y Ferwig will be electing 2 councillors. 19 current wards will see no change under these reforms.

- The existing Rhyd-y-Fuwch and Teifi wards in the town of Cardigan were merged to create a single electoral ward named Cardigan-Teifi.
- The existing Aberporth ward was merged with the community of y Ferwig (previously in the Llangoedmor ward) to create a new two-member electoral ward named Aberporth and Y Ferwig.
- The existing Beulah ward was merged with the community of Llangoedmor to create a new two-member electoral ward named Beulah and Llangoedmor.
- The Capel Dewi and Trefol wards in the community of Llandysul were merged to create a new electoral ward named Llandysul South.
- The existing Troedyraur ward was combined with the Pontshaen and Tregroes wards of the community of Llandysul to create a new electoral ward named Llandysul North and Troedyraur.
- The existing New Quay ward was combined with the community of Llanllwchaearn to create a new electoral ward named New Quay and Llanllwchaearn.
- The communities of Llandysiliogogo and Llangrannog were combined to create a new electoral ward named Llandysilio and Llangrannog.
- The existing Penbryn ward was replaced by a new ward of the same name comprising only the community of Penbryn.
- The existing Aberaeron ward was combined with the LLanddewi Aberarth ward of the community of Dyffryn Arth to create a new electoral ward named Aberaeron and Aberarth.
- The existing Llansanffraid ward was replaced by a ward of the same name comprising the community of Llansanffraid and the Llanbadarn Trefeglwys ward of the community of Dyffryn Arth.
- The existing Lampeter ward continues with the same boundaries but with one councillor rather than two.

== Candidates by party ==
A total of 86 candidates stood for the 38 seats on the council (an average of 2.3 candidates per seat). Six political parties stood candidates in this election, plus 27 independent candidates.

Five candidates (two independent, one Plaid Cymru, one Liberal Democrat, one Labour) were the only candidates in their ward, and were thus returned unopposed without an election taking place.

Party	Number of candidates	Number of wards
Plaid Cymru	30	26
Independent	27	24
Liberal Democrats	12	11
Labour	9	8
Green	5	5
Conservative	2	1
Gwlad	1	1
Total	86 / 38	34

== Overview of results ==
Plaid Cymru won control of Ceredigion County Council in this election. With the number of seats reduced to 38, 20 seats were required for an outright majority. Plaid Cymru won 20 seats (no net change), independents lost four seats, while the Liberal Democrats lost one seat to Gwlad.

Ceredigion local election result 2022
Party	Seats	Gains	Losses	Net gain/loss	Seats %	Votes %	Votes	+/−
Plaid Cymru	20	N/A	N/A	0	52.6	48.5	13,228	+12.4
Independent	9	N/A	N/A	▼4	23.7	27.7	7,548	-5.0
Liberal Democrats	7	N/A	N/A	▼1	18.4	14.3	3,898	-8.5
Labour	1	N/A	N/A	0	2.6	5.1	1,405	-1.4
Gwlad	1	N/A	N/A	▲1	2.6	1.1	290	New
Green	0	N/A	N/A	0	0.0	2.6	709	+1.7
Conservative	0	N/A	N/A	0	0.0	0.4	103	-0.6
Total	38						27,282	

== Ward results ==
* = sitting councillor in this ward prior to election

=== Aberaeron and Aberarth (1 seat) ===
This ward was formed from a merger of the existing Aberaeron ward with the western portion of the Llansantffraed ward around the village of Aberarth.

Aberaeron and Aberarth ward
Party	Candidate	Votes	%	±%
Liberal Democrats	Elizabeth Evans*	702	83.2	N/A
Independent	Peter Huw Lloyd	142	16.8	N/A
Majority		560	66.4	N/A
Turnout		844	66.3	
Liberal Democrats win (new seat)				

=== Aberporth and Y Ferwig (2 seats) ===
This ward was formed by a merger of the Aberporth ward and the northern part of the Pen-parc ward. Prior to this election, Clive Davies was the incumbent councillor for Pen-parc ward, while Gethin Davies was the incumbent councillor for the Aberporth ward.

Aberporth and Y Ferwig ward
Party	Candidate	Votes	%	±%
Plaid Cymru	John Clive Davies*	824	66.0	
Plaid Cymru	Gethin Davies*	793	63.5	
Independent	Sue Lewis	451	36.1	
Majority		N/A	N/A	N/A
Turnout		1,248		
Plaid Cymru win (new seat)				
Plaid Cymru win (new seat)				

=== Aberystwyth Morfa a Glais (2 seats) ===
This ward was formed from a merger of Aberystwyth North ward, Aberystwyth Bronglais ward, Aberystwyth Central ward and the north-western part of Llanbadarn Fawr Sulien ward.

Prior to this election, Mark Anthony Strong was the incumbent councillor for Aberystwyth North ward, while Alun Williams was the incumbent councillor for Aberystwyth Bronglais ward.

Aberystwyth Morfa a Glais ward
Party	Candidate	Votes	%	±%
Plaid Cymru	Alun Williams*	720	56.2	N/A
Plaid Cymru	Mark Antony Strong*	581	45.3	N/A
Liberal Democrats	Iwan Jones Edwards	307	23.9	N/A
Green	CJ Peasley	193	15.1	N/A
Labour	James Ralph Cook	191	14.9	N/A
Labour	Dylan Lewis-Rowlands	165	12.9	N/A
Liberal Democrats	Joe Thomas	146	11.4	N/A
Conservative	Sam Hall	103	8.0	N/A
Conservative	Ewan Lawry	101	7.9	N/A
Majority		N/A	N/A	N/A
Turnout		1,282		
Plaid Cymru win (new seat)				
Plaid Cymru win (new seat)				

=== Aberystwyth Penparcau (2 seats) ===
Aberystwyth Penparcau ward
Party	Candidate	Votes	%	±%
Plaid Cymru	David Carl Worrall	515	61.8	N/A
Plaid Cymru	Steve Davies*	338	40.5	N/A
Labour	Alex Mangold	308	36.9	N/A
Independent	Glyndwr Lloyd Edwards*	157	18.8	N/A
Liberal Democrats	David Mark Lees	127	15.2	N/A
Majority		N/A	N/A	N/A
Turnout		834		
Plaid Cymru hold		Swing	N/A	
Plaid Cymru gain from Liberal Democrats		Swing	N/A	

=== Aberystwyth Rheidol (1 seat) ===
Aberystwyth Rheidol ward
Party	Candidate	Votes	%	±%
Plaid Cymru	Endaf Edwards*	228	33.8	+4.9
Liberal Democrats	Mair Benjamin	172	25.5	+0.3
Labour Co-op	Mathew Norman	162	24.0	+8.1
Independent	Martin Wyn Shewring	112	16.6	+7.6
Majority		56	8.3	+6.1
Turnout		674		
Plaid Cymru hold		Swing	+2.3	

=== Beulah and Llangoedmor (2 seats) ===
This ward was formed by a merger of the southern part of Pen-parc ward, and all of Beulah ward. Prior to the election, both of these were held by Plaid Cymru.

Beulah and Llangoedmor ward
Party	Candidate	Votes	%	±%
Plaid Cymru	Amanda Edwards	804	68.6	N/A
Plaid Cymru	Chris James	759	64.8	N/A
Independent	Gethin James	287	24.5	N/A
Labour	Jan Culley	257	21.9	N/A
Majority		N/A	N/A	N/A
Turnout		1,172		
Plaid Cymru win (new seat)				
Plaid Cymru win (new seat)				

=== Borth (1 seat) ===
Borth ward
Party	Candidate	Votes	%	±%
Independent	Hugh Richard Michael Hughes	378	42.4	+8.2
Green	Naomi Jane Salmon	277	31.1	N/A
Independent	Ray Quant*	237	26.6	−12.5
Majority		101	11.3	+6.4
Turnout		892		
Independent gain from Independent		Swing	-11.4	

=== Ceulan a Maesmawr (1 seat) ===
Ceulan a Maesmawr ward
Party	Candidate	Votes	%	±%
Plaid Cymru	Catrin M. S. Davies	512	59.7	+4.6
Independent	Dilwyn Lewis	345	40.3	−4.6
Majority		167	19.4	+9.2
Turnout		857		
Plaid Cymru hold		Swing	+4.6	

=== Ciliau Aeron (1 seat) ===
Ciliau Aeron ward
Party	Candidate	Votes	%	±%
Independent	Marc Davies*	606	65.0	+13.4
Plaid Cymru	Iwan Thomas	326	35.0	+2.2
Majority		280	30.0	+11.1
Turnout		932		
Independent hold		Swing	+5.1	

=== Faenor (1 seat) ===
Faenor ward
Party	Candidate	Votes	%	±%
Liberal Democrats	John Erfyl Roberts*	381	50.5	−6.7
Plaid Cymru	Elin Mabbutt	298	39.5	+15.4
Labour	Gareth Stevan Kelly	75	9.9	−2.3
Majority		83	11.0	−22.1
Turnout		754		
Liberal Democrats hold		Swing	-10.1	

=== Lampeter (1 seat) ===
Lampeter ward
Party	Candidate	Votes	%	±%
Labour	Hag Harris*	Unopposed		
Labour hold				

=== Llanbadarn Fawr (1 seat) ===
Gareth Davies was the incumbent councillor for the ward of Llanbadarn Fawr, Padarn ward prior to the election, which was merged with part of the Llanbadarn Fawr, Sulien ward (the other part of Sulien forming part of the new Aberystwyth Morfa a Glais ward).

Llanbadarn Fawr ward
Party	Candidate	Votes	%	±%
Plaid Cymru	Gareth Davies*	518	77.6	N/A
Independent	James Richard Arathoon	75	11.2	N/A
Liberal Democrats	Josh Rutty	74	11.1	N/A
Majority		443	66.5	N/A
Turnout		667		
Plaid Cymru win (new seat)				

=== Llandyfriog (1 seat) ===
Llandyfriog ward
Party	Candidate	Votes	%	±%
Plaid Cymru	Wyn Thomas*	Unopposed		
Plaid Cymru hold				

=== Llandysilio and Llangrannog (1 seat) ===
This ward was formed from a merger of the larger south-western section of the Llandysilio-gogo ward and the north eastern section of the Penbryn ward.

Llandysilio and Llangrannog ward
Party	Candidate	Votes	%	±%
Independent	Gareth Lloyd*	Unopposed		
Independent win (new seat)				

=== Llandysul North and Troedyraur (1 seat) ===
This ward was formed from a merger of the Troedyraur ward and the northern half of the Capel Dewi ward. Prior to this election, both wards were held by independents.

Llandysul North and Troedyraur ward
Party	Candidate	Votes	%	±%
Plaid Cymru	Maldwyn Lewis	431	46.3	N/A
Independent	Ioan Thomas	426	45.8	N/A
Green	Brian Richard Mitchell	74	7.9	N/A
Majority		5	0.5	N/A
Turnout		931		
Plaid Cymru win (new seat)				

=== Llandysul South (1 seat) ===
This ward was formed by a merger of the Llandysul Town ward and the south-eastern half of the Capel Dewi ward. Both wards were held by independents prior to this election. Keith Evans was the incumbent councillor for Llandysul Town ward prior to this election.

Llandysul South ward
Party	Candidate	Votes	%	±%
Independent	Keith Evans*	476	58.1	N/A
Plaid Cymru	Matt Adams	343	41.9	N/A
Majority		133	16.2	N/A
Turnout		819		
Independent win (new seat)				

=== Llanfarian (1 seat) ===
Llanfarian ward
Party	Candidate	Votes	%	±%
Liberal Democrats	Geraint Wyn Hughes	524	68.1	N/A
Plaid Cymru	Simon Lloyd Warburton	246	31.9	N/A
Majority		278	36.2	N/A
Turnout		770		
Liberal Democrats gain from Plaid Cymru		Swing	N/A	

=== Llanfihangel Ystrad (1 seat) ===
Llanfihangel Ystrad ward
Party	Candidate	Votes	%	±%
Plaid Cymru	Ceris Jones	434	50.2	−9.0
Independent	Gordon Evans	431	49.8	N/A
Majority		3	0.4	−27.0
Turnout		865		
Plaid Cymru hold		Swing	-29.4	

=== Llangeitho (1 seat) ===
Llangeitho ward
Party	Candidate	Votes	%	±%
Independent	Rhodri Evans*	Unopposed		
Independent hold				

=== Llangybi (1 seat) ===
Llangybi ward
Party	Candidate	Votes	%	±%
Plaid Cymru	Eryl Evans	309	48.4	−21.5
Independent	Jane Morgan	170	26.6	N/A
Labour	Dinah Mulholland	159	24.9	−5.2
Majority		139	21.8	−18.0
Turnout		638		
Plaid Cymru hold		Swing	-24.1	

=== Llannarth (1 seat) ===
Llannarth ward
Party	Candidate	Votes	%	±%
Plaid Cymru	Bryan Gareth Davies	373	64.0	N/A
Independent	Anwen Hughes	210	36.0	N/A
Majority		153	28.0	N/A
Turnout		583		
Plaid Cymru win (new seat)				

=== Llanrhystyd (1 seat) ===
Llanrhystyd ward
Party	Candidate	Votes	%	±%
Gwlad	Gwyn Wigley Evans	290	39.8	N/A
Liberal Democrats	Ken Bird	194	26.6	−31.9
Independent	David Inshaw	181	24.8	N/A
Green	Harry Hayfield	64	8.8	+4.5
Majority		96	13.2	−28.3
Turnout		729		
Gwlad gain from Liberal Democrats		Swing	+35.9	

=== Llanwenog (1 seat) ===
Llanwenog ward
Party	Candidate	Votes	%	±%
Independent	Euros Davies*	503	67.9	N/A
Plaid Cymru	Ryan James Jones	238	32.1	N/A
Majority		265	35.8	N/A
Turnout		741		
Independent hold		Swing	N/A	

=== Llansanffraid (1 seat) ===
The area of this ward was reduced for this election, with the eastern portion of the ward around Aberarth merging with the Aberaeron ward to form Aberaeron and Aberarth.

Llansanffraid ward
Party	Candidate	Votes	%	±%
Plaid Cymru	Keith Henson	446	54.1	N/A
Independent	Dafydd Edwards*	379	45.9	−31.8
Majority		67	8.2	−47.2
Turnout		825		
Plaid Cymru gain from Independent		Swing	+42.9	

=== Lledrod (1 seat) ===
The area of this ward was reduced for this election, with the south-eastern portion of the ward around Ystrad Fflur merging with the Tregaron ward to form Tregaron and Ystrad Fflur.

Lledrod ward
Party	Candidate	Votes	%	±%
Independent	Wyn Evans	257	36.5	N/A
Independent	Aaron Benjamin	239	33.9	+3.2
Plaid Cymru	Angharad Danielle Shaw	208	29.5	+14.3
Majority		18	2.6	−20.7
Turnout		704		
Independent gain from Independent		Swing	+16.7	

=== Melindwr (1 seat) ===
Melindwr ward
Party	Candidate	Votes	%	±%
Plaid Cymru	Rhodri Davies*	674	87.0	+7.8
Green	Chris Simpson	101	13.0	N/A
Majority		573	74.0	+15.6
Turnout		775		
Plaid Cymru hold		Swing	±0.0	

=== Mwldan (1 seat) ===
The English name for this ward was 'Cardigan Mwldan' prior to this election. No changes were made to the ward's boundaries.

Mwldan ward
Party	Candidate	Votes	%	±%
Liberal Democrats	Sian Maehrlein	441	61.7	+14.3
Plaid Cymru	Richard Morgan Jones	274	38.3	−14.3
Majority		167	23.4	+18.6
Turnout		715		
Liberal Democrats gain from Plaid Cymru		Swing	+14.3	

=== New Quay and Llanllwchaearn (1 seat) ===
This ward was formed from a merger of the existing New Quay ward plus a northern section of the Llandysilio-gogo ward.

New Quay and Llanllwchaearn ward
Party	Candidate	Votes	%	±%
Plaid Cymru	Matthew Vaux	482	54.1	N/A
Independent	Dan Potter*	409	45.9	N/A
Majority		73	8.2	N/A
Turnout		891		
Plaid Cymru win (new seat)				

=== Penbryn (1 seat) ===
The area of this ward was reduced for this election, with the north-eastern portion of the ward around Llangrannog merging with part of the Llandysilio ward to form Llandysilio and Llangrannog.

Penbryn ward
Party	Candidate	Votes	%	±%
Independent	Gwyn James*	478	87.5	+15.9
Independent	Jake Robert Rayson	68	12.5	N/A
Majority		410	75.0	+31.8
Turnout		546		
Independent hold		Swing	+1.7	

=== Teifi (1 seat) ===
The Teifi ward was created for this election by the merging of the 'Cardigan, Teifi' and 'Cardigan, Rhydyfuwch' wards. Prior to the election, Elaine Evans was the incumbent councillor for 'Cardigan, Rhydyfuwch' ward, while Catrin Miles was the incumbent councillor for 'Cardigan, Teifi' ward.

Teifi ward
Party	Candidate	Votes	%	±%
Liberal Democrats	Elaine Evans*	330	47.0	N/A
Plaid Cymru	Catrin Miles*	284	40.5	N/A
Labour	John Pope	88	12.5	N/A
Majority		46	6.5	N/A
Turnout		702		
Liberal Democrats win (new seat)				

=== Tirymynach (1 seat) ===
Tirmynach ward
Party	Candidate	Votes	%	±%
Liberal Democrats	Paul Hinge*	Unopposed		
Liberal Democrats hold				

=== Trefeurig (1 seat) ===
Trefeurig ward
Party	Candidate	Votes	%	±%
Plaid Cymru	Caryl Roberts	428	52.7	N/A
Independent	Dai Mason*	384	47.3	N/A
Majority		812	5.4	44
Turnout		812		
Plaid Cymru gain from Independent		Swing	N/A	

=== Tregaron and Ystrad Fflur (1 seat) ===
This ward was formed from a merger of the existing Tregaron ward with a south-eastern portion of Lledrod ward. Prior to this election Ifan Davies was the incumbent councillor for Lledrod ward, and Catherine Hughes was the incumbent councillor for Tregaron ward.

Tregaron and Ystrad Fflur ward
Party	Candidate	Votes	%	±%
Independent	Ifan Davies*	691	70.2	N/A
Plaid Cymru	Catherine Hughes*	294	29.8	N/A
Majority		397	40.4	N/A
Turnout		985		
Independent win (new seat)				

=== Ystwyth (1 seat) ===
Ystwyth ward
Party	Candidate	Votes	%	±%
Liberal Democrats	Meirion Davies*	500	59.0	−1.8
Plaid Cymru	Kerry Elizabeth Ferguson	348	41.0	+1.8
Majority		152	18.0	−3.6
Turnout		848		
Liberal Democrats hold		Swing		

== By-elections between 2022 and 2027 ==
=== Lampeter by-election 2022 ===
A by-election was held in the Lampeter ward following the death of Labour councillor Hag Harris, a member of the Council since its formation in 1995, and previously a member of Dyfed County Council since 1981.

Lampeter by-election, 6 October 2022
Party	Candidate	Votes	%	±%
Plaid Cymru	Ann Bowen Morgan	291	39.5	N/A
Liberal Democrats	Sandra Louise Jervis	268	36.4	N/A
Labour	Dinah Mulholland	160	21.7	+21.7
Independent	Lee Cowles	18	2.4	N/A
Majority		23	3.1	N/A
Turnout		737		
Plaid Cymru gain from Labour		Swing		

=== Llanfarian by-election 2023 ===
A by-election was held in the Llanfarian ward following the resignation of Liberal Democrat councillor Geraint Hughes who had captured the seat from Plaid Cymru in 2022. His party narrowly held the seat.

Llanfarian by-election, 20 July 2023
Party	Candidate	Votes	%	±%
Liberal Democrats	David Raymond Evans	298	48.2	−19.9
Plaid Cymru	Karen Joan Deakin	290	46.9	+15.0
Conservative	Jack Kevin Parker	30	4.9	N/A
Majority		8	1.3	−34.9
Turnout		618		
Liberal Democrats hold		Swing		

=== Aberystwyth Penparcau by-election 2023 ===
A by-election was held in the Aberystwyth Penparcau ward following the resignation of Plaid Cymru councillor Steve Davies who was first elected in 2012. His party held the seat.

Aberystwyth Penparcau by-election, 16 November 2023
Party	Candidate	Votes	%	±%
Plaid Cymru	Shelley Childs	201	36.7	−3.8
Labour	Alex Mangold	122	22.3	−14.6
Independent	Tomi Morgan	122	22.3	N/A
Liberal Democrats	Bryony Siân Davies	76	13.9	−1.3
Conservative	Ewan Roberts William Lawry	27	4.9	N/A
Majority		79	14.4	N/A
Turnout		548	25.2	
Plaid Cymru hold		Swing		

=== Tirymynach by-election 2024 ===
A by-election was held on 17 October in the Tirymynach ward following the death of Liberal Democrat councillor Paul Hinge, who was first elected in 2008.

Tirymynach by-election, 17 October 2024
Party	Candidate	Votes	%	±%
Liberal Democrats	Gareth Lewis	285	48.9	+48.9
Plaid Cymru	Jonathan Evershed	242	41.5	N/A
Reform	Jack Parker	25	4.3	N/A
Conservative	Ethan Terry	17	2.9	N/A
Labour	James Cook	8	1.4	N/A
Green	Harry Hayfield	6	1.0	N/A
Majority		43	7.4	N/A
Turnout		583		
Liberal Democrats hold		Swing		

- Jack Parker was the Conservative candidate in the Llanfarian by-election, but has since left them and joined Reform UK
