= 2004 Ceredigion County Council election =

2004 Welsh local government election

Result of the 2004 Ceredigion County Council election

An election to Ceredigion County Council was held on 10 June 2004 on the same day of the European Elections. It was preceded by the 1999 election and followed by the 2008 election.

The whole council was up for election and following boundary changes the number of seats was reduced to 42. The council remained in a situation of No Overall Control following Plaid Cymru gains at the expense of the Independents. The Independents formed a coalition administration following the previous county council election in May 1999, being largest group on the council along with the Liberal Democrats.

After the election, the composition of the council was:

- Independents 16
- Plaid Cymru 16
- Liberal Democrats 9
- Labour 1

== Election results: overview ==
Sixteen members of the original Council elected in 1995 were again returned.

Three of the elected Independent councilors, namely Gethin James (Aberporth), Ray Quant (Borth) and Haydn Lewis (Penparc) were non-party Independents, in that they did not sit as members of the Independent group of councilors.

Ceredigion local election result 2004
Party	Seats	Gains	Losses	Net gain/loss	Seats %	Votes %	Votes	+/−
Plaid Cymru	16	2	0	+2	38.10	38.92	10,198	-
Independent	12	0	4	-4	28.57	20.69	5,423	-
Liberal Democrats	9	2	0	+2	21.43	20.19	5,291	-
Non-party independents	3	0	3	-3	7.14	9.91	2598	-
Labour	1	0	0	=	2.38	3.00	785	-
Cymraeg/Welsh^{1}	1	1	0	+1	2.38	2.45	643	-
Llais Ceredigion	0	0	0	=	0.00	3.53	925	-
Llais Aberaeron UDP Reject^{2}	0	0	0	=	0.00	0.66	172	-
UKIP	0	0	0	=	0.00	0.37	96	-
Green	0	0	0	=	0.00	0.18	48	-
Conservative	0	0	0	=	0.00	0.10	26	-
Total	42			-2			26,205	

^{1}Cymraeg/Welsh was the label used by independent councillor John Ivor Williams. In 1999, and again in 2008, he ran with the label Independent.
^{2}Llais Aberaeron UDP Reject was the label used by Mary Elizabeth Davies.

== Ward results ==
=== Aberaeron (one seat) ===
Aberaeron 2004
Party	Candidate	Votes	%	±%
Independent	Richard Emlyn Thomas*	458		
Llais Aberaeron	Mary Elizabeth Davies	172		
Independent	Steve Harty	57		
Independent hold		Swing		

=== Aberporth (one seat) ===
Aberporth 2004
Party	Candidate	Votes	%	±%
Independent	Gethin James	396		
Liberal Democrats	Elfyn Owen Rees*	326		
Llais Ceredigion	Emyr Hywel	194		
Independent hold		Swing		

=== Aberteifi, Mwldan (one seat) ===
Aberteifi, Mwldan 2004
Party	Candidate	Votes	%	±%
Independent	Sarah Mary Morris*	406		
Plaid Cymru	Thomas John Adams-Lewis*	286		
Independent win (new seat)				

=== Aberteifi, Rhydyfuwch (one seat) ===
Boundary Change.

Aberteifi, Rhydyfuwch 2004
Party	Candidate	Votes	%	±%
Liberal Democrats	John Mark Cole	203		
Plaid Cymru	Tomos Melfydd George	185		
Liberal Democrats win (new seat)				

=== Aberteifi, Teifi (one seat) ===
Boundary Change.

Aberteifi, Teifi 2004
Party	Candidate	Votes	%	±%
Independent	Alan Wilson*	226		
Plaid Cymru	David Aidan Lloyd Owen	57		
Independent win (new seat)				

=== Aberystwyth Bronglais (one seat) ===
Boundary Change

Aberystwyth Bronglais 2004
Party	Candidate	Votes	%	±%
Plaid Cymru	Alun John Wiliams*	303		
Liberal Democrats	John Paul Maddrell	120		
Plaid Cymru win (new seat)				

=== Aberystwyth Central (one seat) ===
Boundary Change

Aberystwyth Central 2004
Party	Candidate	Votes	%	±%
Liberal Democrats	Ceredig Wyn Davies	252		
Plaid Cymru	Vivian Rees-Butterworth	96		
Independent	Hywel Thomas Jones*	51		
Conservative	Will Quince	26		
Liberal Democrats win (new seat)				

=== Aberystwyth North (one seat) ===
Possible Boundary Change

Aberystwyth North 2004
Party	Candidate	Votes	%	±%
Liberal Democrats	Edgar Carl Williams*	264		
Plaid Cymru	John Aled Davies	239		
Liberal Democrats win (new seat)				

=== Aberystwyth Penparcau (two seats) ===
This ward was previously known as Aberystwyth South

Aberystwyth Penparcau 2004
Party	Candidate	Votes	%	±%
Independent	Llewellyn Goronwy Edwards*	550		
Independent	Owen Henry Jones	364		
Plaid Cymru	Susan Jane Jones-Davies	195		
Plaid Cymru	John Michael Jones	188		
Liberal Democrats	Denise Elizabeth Cole	149		
Green	Timothy John Foster	48		
Independent hold		Swing		
Independent hold		Swing		

=== Aberystwyth Rheidol (one seat) ===
Aberystwyth Rheidol 2004
Party	Candidate	Votes	%	±%
Liberal Democrats	Eric John Griffiths*	580		
Plaid Cymru	Jacqueline Mary Taylor	182		
Liberal Democrats win (new seat)				

=== Beulah (one seat) ===
Beulah 2004
Party	Candidate	Votes	%	±%
Plaid Cymru	William David Lyndon Lloyd	518		
Llais Ceredigion	Ioan Glyndwr Howells	191		
Independent hold		Swing		

=== Borth (one seat) ===
Borth 2004
Party	Candidate	Votes	%	±%
Independent	Raymond Paul Quant*	490		
Plaid Cymru	Mark Antony Strong	277		
Independent hold		Swing		

=== Capel Dewi (one seat) ===
Capel Dewi 2004
Party	Candidate	Votes	%	±%
Independent	Thomas Peter Lloyd Davies	420		
Plaid Cymru	Martha Ann Eileen Curry	181		
Independent hold		Swing		

=== Ceulanamaesmawr (one seat) ===
Ceulanamaesmawr 2004
Party	Candidate	Votes	%	±%
Plaid Cymru	Ellen Elizabeth ap Gwynn*	572		
Liberal Democrats	Maurice Roger Brown	196		
Plaid Cymru hold		Swing		

=== Ciliau Aeron (one seat) ===
Ciliau Aeron 2004
Party	Candidate	Votes	%	±%
Independent	Stanley Meredith Thomas*	451		
Plaid Cymru	Arthur John Moelfryn Maskell	367		
UKIP	Iain James Sheldon	96		
Independent hold		Swing		

=== Faenor (one seat) ===
Faenor 2004
Party	Candidate	Votes	%	±%
Liberal Democrats	John Erfyl Roberts	450		
Plaid Cymru	Alan Lloyd Evans	316		
Liberal Democrats hold		Swing		

=== Lampeter (two seats) ===
Lampeter 2004
Party	Candidate	Votes	%	±%
Labour	Robert George Harris*	785		
Independent	John Ivor Williams*	643		
Plaid Cymru	Andrew Gerald Carter	350		
Labour hold		Swing		
Independent hold		Swing		

=== Llanarth (one seat) ===
Llanarth 2004
Party	Candidate	Votes	%	±%
Liberal Democrats	Thomas Eurfyl Evans*	396		
Plaid Cymru	Dafydd Ieuan Jones	208		
Liberal Democrats hold		Swing		

=== Llanbadarn Fawr Padarn (one seat) ===
Boundary Change

Llanbadarn Fawr Padarn 2004
Party	Candidate	Votes	%	±%
Plaid Cymru	Gareth Davies	223		
Independent	Benjamin Lewis Davies*	187		
Plaid Cymru win (new seat)				

=== Llanbadarn Fawr Sulien (one seat) ===
Boundary Change

Llanbadarn Fawr Sulien 2004
Party	Candidate	Votes	%	±%
Plaid Cymru	Paul James	316		
Liberal Democrats	Heather Fievet Stitt	42		
Plaid Cymru win (new seat)				

=== Llandyfriog (one seat) ===
Llandyfriog 2004
Party	Candidate	Votes	%	±%
Plaid Cymru	Benjamin Towyn Evans	395		
Independent	Derrick Richards	358		
Plaid Cymru gain from Independent		Swing		

=== Llandysiliogogo (one seat) ===
Llandysiliogogo 2004
Party	Candidate	Votes	%	±%
Plaid Cymru	Cen Llwyd*	unopposed		
Plaid Cymru hold		Swing		

=== Llandysul Town (one seat) ===
Llandysul Town 2004
Party	Candidate	Votes	%	±%
Independent	Evan John Keith Evans*	unopposed		
Independent hold		Swing		

=== Llanfarian (one seat) ===
Alun Lloyd Jones had left the Plaid Cymru group and joined the Independents after the 1999 election.

Llanfarian 2004
Party	Candidate	Votes	%	±%
Independent	Alun Lloyd Jones*	340		
Plaid Cymru	Rhodri Mabon ap Gwynfor	318		
Independent hold		Swing		

=== Llanfihangel Ystrad (one seat) ===
Llanfihangel Ystrad 2004
Party	Candidate	Votes	%	±%
Plaid Cymru	Owen Llywelyn	593		
Liberal Democrats	Matthew George Cooper Lewes Gee	380		
Plaid Cymru hold		Swing		

=== Llangeitho (one seat) ===
Llangeitho 2004
Party	Candidate	Votes	%	±%
Independent	David John Evans*	540		
Plaid Cymru	Dafydd Wyn Morse	197		
Independent hold		Swing		

=== Llangybi (one seat) ===
Llangybi 2004
Party	Candidate	Votes	%	±%
Plaid Cymru	John Timothy Odwyn Davies*	454		
Liberal Democrats	Rodney Edmund George Parish	169		
Plaid Cymru hold		Swing		

=== Llanrhystud (one seat) ===
Llanrhystud 2004
Party	Candidate	Votes	%	±%
Liberal Democrats	David Rowland Rees-Evans	392		
Independent	Emyr Morgan Jones	217		
Plaid Cymru	Mari Luned Llwyd	207		
Llais Ceredigion	David John Williams	15		
Liberal Democrats hold		Swing		

=== Llansantffraed (one seat) ===
Llansantffraed 2004
Party	Candidate	Votes	%	±%
Plaid Cymru	Daniel Meurig James*	583		
Independent	Dafydd Wyn Edwards	309		
Liberal Democrats	Carol Ann Kolczak	260		
Plaid Cymru hold		Swing		

=== Llanwenog (one seat) ===
Llanwenog 2004
Party	Candidate	Votes	%	±%
Plaid Cymru	Samuel Haydn Richards*	unopposed		
Plaid Cymru hold		Swing		

=== Lledrod (one seat) ===
Lledrod 2004
Party	Candidate	Votes	%	±%
Independent	David Lloyd Evans*	682		
Llais Ceredigion	Gwilym ab Ioan	319		
Independent hold		Swing		

=== Melindwr (one seat) ===
Melindwr 2004
Party	Candidate	Votes	%	±%
Liberal Democrats	Fred Williams*	540		
Plaid Cymru	Gweirydd Gwyndaf	357		
Liberal Democrats hold		Swing		

=== New Quay (one seat) ===
New Quay 2004
Party	Candidate	Votes	%	±%
Independent	Sarah Gillian Hopley*	363		
Plaid Cymru	Julian Raymond Evans	185		
Independent hold		Swing		

=== Penbryn (one seat) ===
Plaid Cymru had won the seat in a by-election.

Penbryn 2004
Party	Candidate	Votes	%	±%
Plaid Cymru	Ian ap Dewi*	661		
Liberal Democrats	Thomas Sean Fievet Stitt	145		
Plaid Cymru hold		Swing		

=== Penparc (one seat) ===
Penparc 2004
Party	Candidate	Votes	%	±%
Independent	Thomas Haydn Lewis*	755		
Llais Ceredigion	Raymond Michael Dawe	205		
Independent hold		Swing		

=== Tirymynach (one seat) ===
Tirymynach 1999
Party	Candidate	Votes	%	±%
Plaid Cymru	Wiliam Penri James*	465		
Liberal Democrats	Paul Buckingham James Hinge	185		
Plaid Cymru hold		Swing		

=== Trefeurig (one seat) ===
Trefeurig 2004
Party	Candidate	Votes	%	±%
Plaid Cymru	David Suter	375		
Liberal Democrats	Evan Daniel Jones	241		
Independent	John Dilwyn Lewis	93		
Plaid Cymru gain from Independent		Swing		

=== Tregaron (one seat) ===
Tregaron 2004
Party	Candidate	Votes	%	±%
Plaid Cymru	Catherine Jane Hughes	349		
Independent	Nerys Ann Evans	314		
Plaid Cymru gain from Independent		Swing		

=== Troedyraur (one seat) ===
Troedyraur 2004
Party	Candidate	Votes	%	±%
Independent	Gerallt Wynford Jones	unopposed		
Plaid Cymru gain from Independent		Swing		

=== Ystwyth (one seat) ===
Ystwyth 2004
Party	Candidate	Votes	%	±%
Liberal Democrats	John David Rowland Jones*	unopposed		
Liberal Democrats hold		Swing		
