= 1979 Ceredigion District Council election =

1979 Welsh local election

The third round election to Ceredigion District Council was held in May 1979. It was preceded by the 1976 election and followed by the 1983 election. On the same day there was a UK General Election and elections to the other district and community councils in Wales.

== Results ==
=== Aberaeron (one seat) ===
Aberaeron 1979
Party	Candidate	Votes	%	±%
Independent	Thomas Glyn Griffiths Herbert*	Unopposed		
Independent hold		Swing		

=== Aberbanc (one seat) ===
Aberbanc 1979
Party	Candidate	Votes	%	±%
Independent	B. Jones	558	52.7	
Plaid Cymru	L. Jones	501	47.3	
Majority			5.4	
Turnout			89.3	
Independent hold		Swing		

=== Aberporth (one seat) ===
Aberporth 1979
Party	Candidate	Votes	%	±%
Independent	J.L. Davies*	928	77.5	
Plaid Cymru	Tomos Melfydd George	269	22.5	
Majority			55.1	
Turnout			67.0	
Independent hold		Swing		

=== Aberystwyth Ward One (four seats) ===
Aberystwyth Ward One 1979
Party	Candidate	Votes	%	±%
Labour	Griffith Eric Hughes*	1,739		
Labour	W.J. Eden	1,222		
Labour	John Marek	1,077		
Liberal	G. Parry	1,074		
Plaid Cymru	G. Edwards	1,038		
Turnout				
Labour hold		Swing		
Labour hold		Swing		
Labour gain from Independent Labour		Swing		
Liberal gain from Independent		Swing		

=== Aberystwyth Ward Two (two seats) ===
Aberystwyth Ward Two 1979
Party	Candidate	Votes	%	±%
Liberal	Miss K.A. Jones*	1,057		
Liberal	Ceredig Jones	860		
Plaid Cymru	R. Davies*	828		
Turnout			79.5	
Liberal hold		Swing		
Liberal gain from Plaid Cymru		Swing		

=== Aberystwyth Ward Three (two seats) ===
Aberystwyth Ward Three 1979
Party	Candidate	Votes	%	±%
Plaid Cymru	Hywel Griffiths Evans*	unopposed		
Liberal	M. Jones*	unopposed		
Turnout				
Plaid Cymru hold		Swing		
Liberal hold		Swing		

=== Aeron (one seat) ===
Aeron 1979
Party	Candidate	Votes	%	±%
Independent	D. Jones*	unopposed		
Independent hold		Swing		

=== Borth (one seat) ===
Borth 1979
Party	Candidate	Votes	%	±%
Independent	William Thomas Kinsey Raw-Rees*	unopposed		
Independent hold		Swing		

=== Bow Street (one seat) ===
Bow Street 1976
Party	Candidate	Votes	%	±%
Plaid Cymru	Hywel Wyn Jones	472	54.1	
Independent	Dafydd F. Raw-Rees	400	45.9	
Majority			8.2	
Turnout			84.9	
Plaid Cymru gain from Independent		Swing		

=== Cardigan (three seats) ===
Cardigan 1979
Party	Candidate	Votes	%	±%
Liberal	W. Jenkins*	unopposed		
Independent	O.M. Owen*	unopposed		
Independent	I.J.C. Radley*	unopposed		
Liberal hold		Swing		
Independent hold		Swing		
Independent hold		Swing		

=== Cwmrheidol and Devils' Bridge (one seat) ===
Cwmrheidol and Devils' Bridge 1979
Party	Candidate	Votes	%	±%
Independent	E.H. Evans	344	64.3	
Liberal	E. Griffiths	127	23.7	
Plaid Cymru	M. Davies	64	12.0	
Majority			40.6	
Turnout			89.6	
Liberal hold		Swing		

=== Faenor Upper (one seat) ===
Faenor Upper 1979
Party	Candidate	Votes	%	±%
Independent	M.B. Roberts*	unopposed		
Independent hold		Swing		

=== Felinfach (one seat) ===
Felinfach 1979
Party	Candidate	Votes	%	±%
Independent	W.A. Jones*	unopposed		
Independent hold		Swing		

=== Lampeter (two seats) ===
Lampeter 1979
Party	Candidate	Votes	%	±%
Independent	J.R. Evans	928		
Independent	J.E. Roberts	732		
Liberal	Mrs C.P. Barton	664		
Turnout				
Independent hold		Swing		
Independent hold		Swing		

=== Llanarth (one seat) ===
Llanarth 1979
Party	Candidate	Votes	%	±%
Independent	Alan Thomas	711	78.7	
Independent	S. Thomas*	193	21.3	
Majority			57.4	
Turnout			80.6	
Independent hold		Swing		

=== Llanbadarn Fawr (one seat) ===
Llanbadarn Fawr 1979
Party	Candidate	Votes	%	±%
Independent	J.E. Raw-Rees*	755	58.6	
Labour	M. Leather	533	41.4	
Majority		222	17.2	
Turnout			69.0	
Independent hold		Swing		

=== Llandygwydd (one seat) ===
Llandygwydd 1979
Party	Candidate	Votes	%	±%
Independent	John Elfed Davies	unopposed		
Independent hold		Swing		

=== Llandysul North (one seat) ===
Llandysul North 1979
Party	Candidate	Votes	%	±%
Independent	Thomas John Jones*	unopposed		
Independent hold		Swing		

=== Llandysul South (one seat) ===
Llandysul South 1979
Party	Candidate	Votes	%	±%
Independent	A.Ll. Evans	688	66.2	
Conservative	D. Gutteridge	352	33.8	
Majority			32.4	
Turnout			83.0	
Independent hold		Swing		

=== Llanfair and Llanwnen (one seat) ===
Llanfair and Llanwnen 1979
Party	Candidate	Votes	%	±%
Independent	Johnny Williams*	unopposed		
Independent hold		Swing		

=== Llanfarian (one seat) ===
Llanfarian 1979
Party	Candidate	Votes	%	±%
Labour	Arthur Morgan*	259	37.6	
Plaid Cymru	E. Jones	235	34.1	
Liberal	J. Thomas	195	28.3	
Majority		24	3.5	
Turnout			75.1	
Labour hold		Swing		

=== Llanfihangel and Llanilar (one seat) ===
The sitting member was elected as an Independent in 1976.

Llanfihangel and Llanilar 1979
Party	Candidate	Votes	%	±%
Liberal	Ll.D. Jones*	unopposed		
Liberal gain from Independent		Swing		

=== Llangeitho and Caron Isclawdd (one seat) ===
Llangeitho and Caron Isclawdd 1979
Party	Candidate	Votes	%	±%
Liberal	W.G. Bennett*	unopposed		
Independent hold		Swing		

=== Llangoedmor (one seat) ===
Llangoedmor 1979
Party	Candidate	Votes	%	±%
Independent	I.J. Griffiths*	407	54.3	
Independent	A. Griffiths	343	45.7	
Majority			8.5	
Turnout			86.2	
Independent hold		Swing		

=== Llangrannog and Penbryn (one seat) ===
Llangrannog and Penbryn 1979
Party	Candidate	Votes	%	±%
Independent	E.T. Jenner	unopposed		
Independent hold		Swing		

=== Llanilar and Llanrhystud (one seat) ===
Llanilar and Llanrhystud 1979
Party	Candidate	Votes	%	±%
Liberal	William Richard Edwards*	unopposed		
Liberal hold		Swing		

=== Llanllwchaiarn and Llandysiliogogo (one seat) ===
Llanllwchaiarn and Llandysiliogogo 1979
Party	Candidate	Votes	%	±%
Independent	J.E. Evans*	unopposed		
Independent hold		Swing		

=== Llansantffraid and Cilcennin (one seat) ===
Llansantffraid and Cilcennin 1979
Party	Candidate	Votes	%	±%
Independent	L. Lloyd*	unopposed		
Independent hold		Swing		

=== Llanwenog (one seat) ===
Llanwenog 1979
Party	Candidate	Votes	%	±%
Independent	D.A. James*	unopposed		
Independent hold		Swing		

=== Lledrod, Strata Florida and Ysbyty Ystwyth (one seat) ===
Lledrod, Strata Florida and Ysbyty Ystwyth 1979
Party	Candidate	Votes	%	±%
Independent	David Lloyd Evans*	unopposed		
Independent hold		Swing		

=== Nantcwnlle, Llanddewi Brefi and Llangeitho (one seat) ===
Nantcwnlle, Llanddewi Brefi and Llangeitho 1979
Party	Candidate	Votes	%	±%
Independent	Hannah Marion Jones	495	51.2	
Liberal	E. Williams*	471	48.8	
Majority			2.4	
Turnout			89.4	
Independent gain from Liberal		Swing		

=== New Quay (one seat) ===
New Quay 1979
Party	Candidate	Votes	%	±%
Independent	I.C. Pursey*	unopposed		
Independent hold		Swing		

=== Taliesin and Talybont (one seat) ===
Taliesin and Talybont 1979
Party	Candidate	Votes	%	±%
Independent	John Rowland Davies*	Unopposed		
Independent hold				

=== Trefeurig and Goginan (one seat) ===
Trefeurig and Goginan 1979
Party	Candidate	Votes	%	±%
Independent	J. Jones*	unopposed		
Independent hold		Swing		

=== Troedyraur (one seat) ===
Troedyraur 1979
Party	Candidate	Votes	%	±%
Independent	S. Idris Evans*	unopposed		
Independent hold		Swing		
