= 1983 Ceredigion District Council election =

1983 Welsh local election

An election to Ceredigion District Council was held in May 1983. It was preceded by the 1979 election and followed by the 1987 election. On the same day there were elections to the other district local authorities and community councils in Wales.

== Results ==
=== Aberaeron (one seat) ===
Aberaeron 1983
Party	Candidate	Votes	%	±%
Independent	J.A. Rees*	unopposed		
Independent hold		Swing		

=== Aberbanc (one seat) ===
Aberbanc 1983
Party	Candidate	Votes	%	±%
Independent	L.L. Jones*	unopposed		
Independent hold		Swing		

=== Aberporth (one seat) ===
Aberporth 1983
Party	Candidate	Votes	%	±%
Independent	J.L. Davies*	unopposed		
Independent hold		Swing		

=== Aberystwyth Ward One (four seats) ===
Aberystwyth Ward One 1983
Party	Candidate	Votes	%	±%
Alliance (SDP)	Gareth Ellis*	1,223		
Alliance (SDP)	Llewellyn Goronwy Edwards	1,086		
Alliance (SDP)	Owen Henry Jones	825		
Labour	C.H. Evans	617		
Labour	J.B. Evans	554		
Labour	Mrs B.E. Cole	524		
Labour	W.J. Eden*	518		
Alliance (Liberal)	M. Mantock	449		
Alliance hold		Swing		
Alliance gain from Labour		Swing		
Alliance gain from Labour		Swing		
Labour hold		Swing		

=== Aberystwyth Ward Two (two seats) ===
Aberystwyth Ward Two 1983
Party	Candidate	Votes	%	±%
Labour	Thomas Elwyn Williams	530		
Alliance (Liberal)	Ceredig Jones*	453		
Independent	Mona Rachel Morris	371		
Plaid Cymru	Robert Davies	349		
Alliance (Liberal)	Miss K.A. Jones*	309		
Labour gain from Alliance		Swing		
Alliance hold		Swing		

=== Aberystwyth Ward Three (two seats) ===
Aberystwyth Ward Three 1983
Party	Candidate	Votes	%	±%
Plaid Cymru	Hywel Griffiths Evans*	897		
Alliance (Liberal)	M. Jones*	842		
Alliance (Liberal)	J.R. Thomas	471		
Plaid Cymru hold		Swing		
Alliance hold		Swing		

=== Aeron (one seat) ===
Aeron 1983
Party	Candidate	Votes	%	±%
Liberal	Evan Evans Williams	329		
Plaid Cymru	B. Roberts	257		
Majority				
Liberal hold		Swing		

=== Borth (one seat) ===
Borth 1983
Party	Candidate	Votes	%	±%
Independent	William Thomas Kinsey Raw-Rees*	unopposed		
Independent hold		Swing		

=== Bow Street (one seat) ===
Bow Street 1983
Party	Candidate	Votes	%	±%
Plaid Cymru	Hywel Wyn Jones*	393		
Independent	D.F. Raw-Rees	233		
Majority				
Plaid Cymru hold		Swing		

=== Cardigan (three seats) ===
Cardigan 1983
Party	Candidate	Votes	%	±%
Independent	I.J.C. Radley*	876		
Independent	O.M. Owen*	852		
Independent	John Bertram Evans*	820		
Independent	C.M. Phillips	465		
Independent hold		Swing		
Independent hold		Swing		
Independent hold		Swing		

=== Cwmrheidol and Devils' Bridge (one seat) ===
Cwmrheidol and Devils' Bridge 1983
Party	Candidate	Votes	%	±%
Independent	E.H. Evans*	unopposed		
Independent hold		Swing		

=== Faenor Upper (one seat) ===
Faenor Upper 1983
Party	Candidate	Votes	%	±%
Independent	M.B. Roberts*	unopposed		
Independent hold		Swing		

=== Felinfach (one seat) ===
Felinfach 1983
Party	Candidate	Votes	%	±%
Independent	W.A. Jones*	unopposed		
Independent hold		Swing		

=== Lampeter (two seats) ===
Lampeter 1983
Party	Candidate	Votes	%	±%
Independent	J.R. Evans*	861		
Alliance (Liberal)	Mrs C.P. Barton	751		
Independent	J.E. Roberts*	656		
Alliance (Liberal)	A. Lawson	332		
Independent hold		Swing		
Alliance gain from Independent		Swing		

=== Llanarth (one seat) ===
Llanarth 1983
Party	Candidate	Votes	%	±%
Independent	Alan Thomas*	564		
Independent	J.O. Evans	205		
Majority				
Independent hold		Swing		

=== Llanbadarn Fawr (one seat) ===
Llanbadarn Fawr 1983
Party	Candidate	Votes	%	±%
Independent	J.E. Raw-Rees*	353		
Labour	R.B. Kemp	154		
Majority				
Independent hold		Swing		

=== Llandygwydd (one seat) ===
Llandygwydd 1983
Party	Candidate	Votes	%	±%
Independent	John Elfed Davies*	unopposed		
Independent hold		Swing		

=== Llandysul North (one seat) ===
Llandysul North 1983
Party	Candidate	Votes	%	±%
Independent	Thomas John Jones*	unopposed		
Independent hold		Swing		

=== Llandysul South (one seat) ===
Llandysul South 1983
Party	Candidate	Votes	%	±%
Independent	A.Ll. Evans	unopposed		
Independent hold		Swing		

=== Llanfair and Llanwnen (one seat) ===
Llanfair and Llanwnen 1983
Party	Candidate	Votes	%	±%
Independent	Johnny Williams*	unopposed		
Independent hold		Swing		

=== Llanfarian (one seat) ===
Llanfarian 1983
Party	Candidate	Votes	%	±%
Independent	A Morgan*	unopposed		
Independent hold		Swing		

=== Llanfihangel and Llanilar (one seat) ===
Llanfihangel and Llanilar 1983
Party	Candidate	Votes	%	±%
Liberal	Ll.D. Jones*	416		
Independent	W. Morgan	408		
Majority		8		
Liberal hold		Swing		

=== Llangeitho and Caron Isclawdd (one seat) ===
Llangeitho and Caron Isclawdd 1983
Party	Candidate	Votes	%	±%
Independent	W.G. Bennett*	unopposed		
Independent hold		Swing		

=== Llangoedmor (one seat) ===
Llangoedmor 1983
Party	Candidate	Votes	%	±%
Independent	I.J. Griffiths*	unopposed		
Independent hold		Swing		

=== Llangrannog and Penbryn (one seat) ===
Llangrannog and Penbryn 1983
Party	Candidate	Votes	%	±%
Liberal	E.T. Jenner*	769		
Independent	M.M. Woodford	47		
Majority		722		
Liberal hold		Swing		

=== Llanilar and Llanrhystud (one seat) ===
Llanilar and Llanrhystud 1983
Party	Candidate	Votes	%	±%
Liberal	William Richard Edwards*	unopposed		
Liberal hold		Swing		

=== Llanllwchaiarn and Llandysiliogogo (one seat) ===
Llanllwchaiarn and Llandysiliogogo 1983
Party	Candidate	Votes	%	±%
Independent	J.E. Evans*	unopposed		
Independent hold		Swing		

=== Llansantffraid and Cilcennin (one seat) ===
Llansantffraid and Cilcennin 1983
Party	Candidate	Votes	%	±%
Independent	L. Lloyd*	unopposed		
Independent hold		Swing		

=== Llanwenog (one seat) ===
Llanwenog 1983
Party	Candidate	Votes	%	±%
Independent	D.A. James*	unopposed		
Independent hold		Swing		

=== Lledrod, Strata Florida and Ysbyty Ystwyth (one seat) ===
Lledrod, Strata Florida and Ysbyty Ystwyth 1983
Party	Candidate	Votes	%	±%
Independent	M.J. Morgan	unopposed		
Independent hold		Swing		

=== Nantcwnlle, Llanddewi Brefi and Llangeitho (one seat) ===
Nantcwnlle, Llanddewi Brefi and Llangeitho 1983
Party	Candidate	Votes	%	±%
Liberal	Hannah Marion Jones*	467		
Independent	J.G. Lloyd	428		
Majority		39		
Liberal hold		Swing		

=== New Quay (one seat) ===
New Quay 1983
Party	Candidate	Votes	%	±%
Independent	I.C. Pursey*	325		
Independent	R.F. de S. Pickering	164		
Majority		161		
Independent hold		Swing		

=== Taliesin and Talybont (one seat) ===
Taliesin and Talybont 1983
Party	Candidate	Votes	%	±%
Independent	John Rowland Davies*	Unopposed		
Independent hold				

=== Trefeurig and Goginan (one seat) ===
Trefeurig and Goginan 1983
Party	Candidate	Votes	%	±%
Independent	J. Jones*	unopposed		
Independent hold		Swing		

=== Troedyraur (one seat) ===
Troedyraur 1983
Party	Candidate	Votes	%	±%
Independent	Rev S. Idris Evans*	unopposed		
Independent hold		Swing		
