= Ceredigion County Council =

Local government of Ceredigion, Wales

Ceredigion County Council Cyngor Sir Ceredigion (Welsh)

Type
- Type: Principal council of Ceredigion

History
- Founded: 1 April 1996
- Preceded by: Dyfed County Council; Ceredigion District Council

Leadership
- Chair: John Roberts, Liberal Democrat since 15 May 2026
- Leader: Bryan Davies, Plaid Cymru since 13 May 2022
- Chief Executive: Eifion Evans since 1 October 2017

Structure
- Seats: 38 councillors
- Graph of the party split among 38 seats.
- Political groups: Administration (21) Plaid Cymru (21) Other parties (17) Liberal Democrats (7) Gwlad (1) Independent (9)
- Joint committees: Mid and West Wales Fire and Rescue Service
- Length of term: 5 years

Elections
- Voting system: First-past-the-post
- First election: 4 May 1995
- Last election: 5 May 2022
- Next election: 6 May 2027

Meeting place
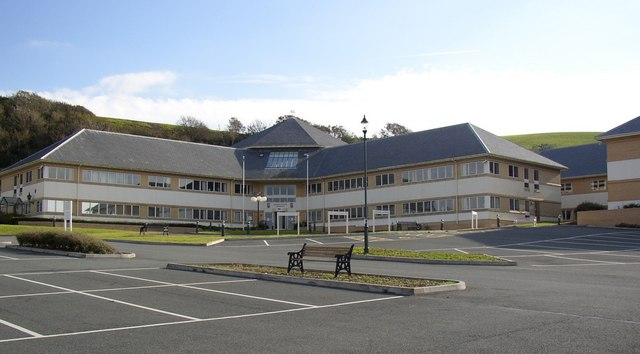
- Neuadd Cyngor Ceredigion, Penmorfa, Aberaeron, SA46 0PA

Website
- www.ceredigion.gov.uk

Ceredigion County Council (Welsh: Cyngor Sir Ceredigion) is the local authority for the county of Ceredigion, one of the principal areas of Wales. The council's main offices are in Aberaeron.

== History ==
The current council was created on 1 April 1996 under the Local Government (Wales) Act 1994, replacing Ceredigion District Council and also taking over county-level functions in the area from Dyfed County Council, which was abolished. The 1994 act specified that the new authority was to have both an English and a Welsh name: Cardiganshire / Sir Aberteifi. The new authority was elected in 1995, but acted as a shadow authority alongside the outgoing district and county councils until the new arrangements took effect the following year. During that time, the shadow authority requested a change of name from Cardiganshire / Sir Aberteifi to Ceredigion for both languages. The government confirmed the change with effect from 2 April 1996, one day after the new council came into being.

=== Public health ===
The county had the lowest rates of people infected with or dying from COVID-19 in the British mainland, up to June 2020. The area is naturally rural; holiday attractions and the university were closed down very early. The council set up its own contact tracing system in March 2020.

== Political control ==
The council has been under Plaid Cymru majority control since the 2022 election.

The first election to the new council was held in 1995. It initially operated as a shadow authority alongside the outgoing authorities, before formally coming into its powers on 1 April 1996. Political control of the council since 1996 has been as follows:

Party in control	Years
Independent	1996–1999
No overall control	1999–2003
Independent	2003–2004
No overall control	2004–2022
Plaid Cymru	2022–present

=== Leadership ===
The leaders of the council since 1996 have been:

Councillor	Party	From	To
Dai Lloyd Evans	Independent	1996	2006
Keith Evans	Independent	2006	May 2012
Ellen ap Gwynn	Plaid Cymru	11 May 2012	May 2022
Bryan Davies	Plaid Cymru	13 May 2022	

=== Composition ===
Following the 2022 election, and subsequent by-elections and changes of allegiance up to October 2026, the composition of the council was:

Party	Seats
Plaid Cymru	21
Liberal Democrats	7
Gwlad	1
Independent	9
Total	38

The Gwlad councillor and eight of the independent councillors sit together as the "Independents Group". The other independent councillor is unaffiliated to any group. The next election is due in 2027.

== Elections ==
Elections take place every five years. The last full county election took place on 5 May 2022. The next election is due in May 2027.

Year	Seats	Plaid Cymru	Independent	Liberal Democrats	Labour	Gwlad	Notes
1995	43	6	**26**	10	1	N/A	Independent majority control
1999	44	14	**22**	7	1	N/A	Independent led with Lib Dem support
2004	42	**16**	**16**	9	1	N/A	Independent led with Lib Dem support
2008	42	**19**	12	10	1	N/A	Independent led with Lib Dem support
2012	42	**19**	15	7	1	N/A	Plaid Cymru led with Independent support
2017	42	**20**	13	8	1	N/A	Plaid Cymru led with Independent support
2022	38	**20**	9	7	1	1	Plaid Cymru majority control

Party with the most elected councillors in bold. Coalition agreements in notes column.

== Premises ==
Since the local government reorganisation in 1996, the council has had its meeting place and main offices at Neuadd Cyngor Ceredigion (English: Ceredigion Council Hall) at Penmorfa in Aberaeron. The building was erected in the early 1990s for the council's predecessor, Ceredigion District Council.

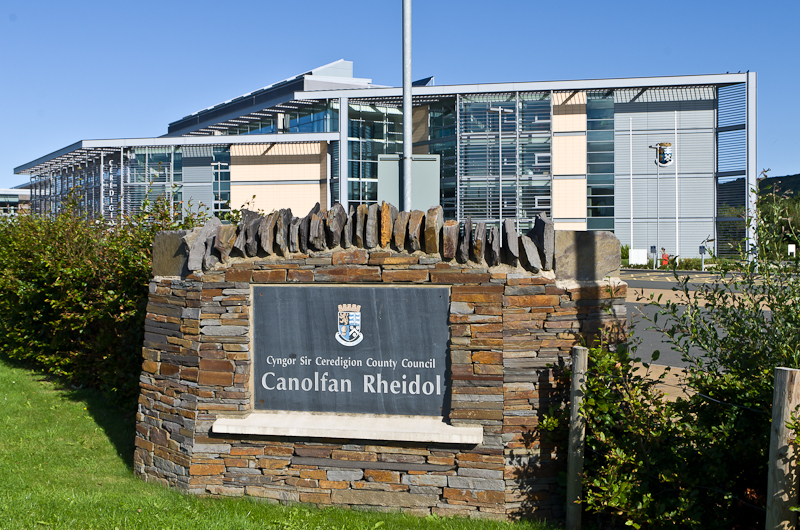
Council's offices at Canolfan Rheidol on outskirts of Aberystwyth, opened 2009.

When the council was created in 1996 it inherited various offices from its predecessor authorities, including Swyddfa'r Sir in Aberystwyth, which had been built as the Queen's Hotel in 1866 and had served as the headquarters of the former Cardiganshire County Council from 1950 until 1974, then served as an area office for Dyfed County Council from 1974 until 1996. The council also inherited Aberystwyth Town Hall, which had been the headquarters of Ceredigion District Council. Both these Aberystwyth offices closed in 2009 when the council opened a new Aberystwyth area office at Canolfan Rheidol in Llanbadarn Fawr on the outskirts of Aberystwyth. The council also has area offices in Lampeter and Cardigan.

== Arms ==
Coat of arms of Ceredigion County Council
Notes Originally granted to Cardiganshire County Council on 21 October 1937 Coronet A mural crown Or. Escutcheon Quarterly per pale indented first Sable a lion rampant reguardant Or second barry wavy of six Argent and Azure a herring haurient proper third Azure a garb Or banded Gules and fourth Sable a chevron between three roses Argent barbed and seeded Proper. Motto Golud Gwlad Rhyddid (A Nation's Wealth Is Freedom)
