= 2008 Ceredigion County Council election =

2008 Welsh local government election

Result of the 2008 Ceredigion County Council election

The 2008 election to Ceredigion County Council was held on 1 May 2008 along with elections to other Welsh councils, plus the London Mayor and Assembly Elections, Metropolitan English councils and Non Metropolitan English councils elections. All 42 council seats were up for election. It was preceded by the 2004 election and followed by the 2012 election.

The previous council was controlled by Independents in coalition with the Liberal Democrat group and the single Labour member. Since 2004, there have been no by-elections to the council (the only council in Wales not to have any during the last four years). Nominations for the council elections closed on 4 April 2008. The last council meeting before the elections (when the council was formally dissolved) was held on 17 April 2008. The composition of the council prior to the elections was:

- Independents 16
- Plaid Cymru 16
- Liberal Democrats 9
- Labour 1

2 Independents had defected to Plaid Cymru and a further 2 Independents had retired. All existing councillors bar the 2 retirees were up for re-election.

== Election results: overview ==
Ceredigion local election result 2008
| Party | Seats | Gains | Losses | Net gain/loss | Seats % | Votes % | Votes | +/− |
|---|---|---|---|---|---|---|---|---|
| Plaid Cymru | 19 | 6 | 3 | +3 | 45.23 | 43.80 | 12,141 | +4.88 |
| Independent | 11 | 6 | 7 | -1 | 26.19 | 21.03 | 5,830 | +0.34 |
| Liberal Democrats | 10 | 2 | 1 | +1 | 23.8 | 23.86 | 6,613 | +3.67 |
| Non-party independents | 1 | 1 | 3 | -2 | 2.38 | 4.71 | 1,305 | -4.71 |
| Labour | 1 | 0 | 0 | 0 | 2.38 | 3.19 | 885 | +0.19 |
| Conservative | 0 | 0 | 0 | 0 | 0.00 | 2.93 | 805 | +2.80 |
| Green | 0 | 0 | 0 | 0 | 0.00 | 0.51 | 139 | +0.32 |
| Others | 0 | 0 | 1 | -1 | 0.0 | N/A | 0 | -7.01 |
| Total | 42 | | | | | | 27,718 | |

All parties received a higher share of the vote than in 2004. This was in part due to a fall in the number of non-party independents standing and previous non-party independents joining the independent grouping, but also due to a number of parties (namely UKIP and Llais Ceredigion) not standing candidates this time around.

Plaid Cymru made six gains. They gained a seat in the ward of Aberystwyth, Penparcau, as well as the wards of Cardigan, Mwldan, Cardigan, Teifi, Ciliau Aeron, Llanfarian, Llangeitho and Melindwr. The party also made four losses: Llandysilio-gogo, Llansantffraid, Tirymynach and Troedyraur.

The Liberal Democrats made two gains, Tirymynach and Aberaeron, but lost Melindwr.

The three non-party independents from 2004 were re-elected as Independents (Haydn Lewis in Pen-parc, Gethin James in Aberporth and Ray Quant in Borth), as well as John Ivor Williams, who had held his seat in 2004 under the label Cymraeg/Welsh. A single candidate was elected as a non-party independent (Gareth Lloyd Cletwr in Llandysilio-gogo).

Nine members of the original Council elected in 1995 were again returned.

== Ward results ==
=== Aberaeron (one seat) ===
Aberaeron 2008
| Party | Candidate | Votes | % | ±% |
|---|---|---|---|---|
| Liberal Democrats | Elizabeth Evans | 493 | | |
| Independent | Richard Emlyn Thomas* | 247 | | |
| Liberal Democrats gain from Independent | | Swing | | |

=== Aberporth (one seat) ===
Aberporth 2008
| Party | Candidate | Votes | % | ±% |
|---|---|---|---|---|
| Independent | Gethin James | 610 | | |
| Conservative | Mark William Mainwaring | 251 | | |
| Independent hold | | Swing | | |

=== Aberteifi, Mwldan (one seat) ===
Aberteifi, Mwldan 2008
| Party | Candidate | Votes | % | ±% |
|---|---|---|---|---|
| Plaid Cymru | Thomas John Adams-Lewis | 503 | | |
| Independent | Sarah Mary Morris* | 202 | | |
| Conservative | Bradley George Stephen Vaughan | 48 | | |
| Plaid Cymru gain from Independent | | Swing | | |

=== Aberteifi, Rhydyfuwch (one seat) ===
Aberteifi, Rhydyfuwch 2008
| Party | Candidate | Votes | % | ±% |
|---|---|---|---|---|
| Liberal Democrats | John Mark Cole* | 370 | | |
| Plaid Cymru | Ann Rees-Sambrook | 60 | | |
| Liberal Democrats hold | | Swing | | |

=== Aberteifi, Teifi (one seat) ===
Aberteifi, Rhydyfuwch 2008
| Party | Candidate | Votes | % | ±% |
|---|---|---|---|---|
| Plaid Cymru | Catrin Miles | 167 | | |
| Independent | Alan Wilson* | 124 | | |
| Plaid Cymru gain from Independent | | Swing | | |

=== Aberystwyth Bronglais (one seat) ===
Aberystwyth Bronglais 2008
| Party | Candidate | Votes | % | ±% |
|---|---|---|---|---|
| Plaid Cymru | Alun John Wiliams* | 376 | | |
| Liberal Democrats | Trevor Graham Shaftoe | 76 | | |
| Conservative | Robert Mark Schofield | 33 | | |
| Plaid Cymru hold | | Swing | | |

=== Aberystwyth Central (one seat) ===
Aberystwyth Central 2008
| Party | Candidate | Votes | % | ±% |
|---|---|---|---|---|
| Liberal Democrats | Ceredig Wyn Davies* | 296 | | |
| Plaid Cymru | Mark Strong | 142 | | |
| Conservative | Emily Day | 24 | | |
| Liberal Democrats hold | | Swing | | |

=== Aberystwyth North (one seat) ===
Aberystwyth North 2008
| Party | Candidate | Votes | % | ±% |
|---|---|---|---|---|
| Liberal Democrats | Edgar Carl Williams* | 275 | | |
| Plaid Cymru | John Aled Davies | 252 | | |
| Conservative | Anthony Alexander Pickles | 40 | | |
| Liberal Democrats hold | | Swing | | |

=== Aberystwyth Penparcau (two seats) ===
Aberystwyth Penparcau 2008
| Party | Candidate | Votes | % | ±% |
|---|---|---|---|---|
| Plaid Cymru | Rob Gorman | 419 | | |
| Independent | Llewellyn Goronwy Edwards* | 391 | | |
| Plaid Cymru | Steve Davies | 377 | | |
| Independent | Owen Henry Jones* | 195 | | |
| Liberal Democrats | Mick Jones | 97 | | |
| Labour | Richard Boudier | 95 | | |
| Conservative | David John Cogdell | 46 | | |
| Conservative | Graeme Matthew David Smith | 31 | | |
| Plaid Cymru gain from Independent | | Swing | | |
| Independent hold | | Swing | | |

=== Aberystwyth Rheidol (one seat) ===
Aberystwyth Rheidol 2008
| Party | Candidate | Votes | % | ±% |
|---|---|---|---|---|
| Liberal Democrats | Eric John Griffiths* | 490 | | |
| Plaid Cymru | Susan Jones-Davies | 197 | | |
| Conservative | Jason Luke Edwards | 38 | | |
| Liberal Democrats hold | | Swing | | |

=== Beulah (one seat) ===
Beulah 2008
| Party | Candidate | Votes | % | ±% |
|---|---|---|---|---|
| Plaid Cymru | William David Lyndon Lloyd* | 690 | | |
| Liberal Democrats | Neil Flower | 121 | | |
| Plaid Cymru hold | | Swing | | |

=== Borth (one seat) ===
Borth 2008
| Party | Candidate | Votes | % | ±% |
|---|---|---|---|---|
| Independent | Raymond Paul Quant* | 436 | | |
| Independent | James Whitlock Davies | 333 | | |
| Independent hold | | Swing | | |

=== Capel Dewi (one seat) ===
Cllr Peter Davies (Ind, Capel Dewi) was elected unopposed in 2008. He was first elected in 2004 (beating a Plaid Cymru candidate by 239 votes (40%) and sits on the Development Control Committee and the Standards Committee.

Capel Dewi 2008
| Party | Candidate | Votes | % | ±% |
|---|---|---|---|---|
| Independent | Thomas Peter Lloyd Davies | unopposed | | |
| Independent hold | | Swing | | |

=== Ceulanamaesmawr (one seat) ===
Ceulanamaesmawr 2008
| Party | Candidate | Votes | % | ±% |
|---|---|---|---|---|
| Plaid Cymru | Ellen Elizabeth ap Gwynn* | 527 | | |
| Liberal Democrats | Richard Oliver Morgan-Ash | 172 | | |
| Plaid Cymru hold | | Swing | | |

=== Ciliau Aeron (one seat) ===
Plaid Cymru had captured the seat in a by-election.

Ciliau Aeron 2008
| Party | Candidate | Votes | % | ±% |
|---|---|---|---|---|
| Plaid Cymru | Arthur John Moelfryn Maskell | 544 | | |
| Liberal Democrats | Harry Hayfield | 151 | | |
| UKIP | Iain James Sheldon | 117 | | |
| Plaid Cymru hold | | Swing | | |

=== Faenor (one seat) ===
Faenor 2008
| Party | Candidate | Votes | % | ±% |
|---|---|---|---|---|
| Liberal Democrats | John Erfyl Roberts* | 501 | | |
| Plaid Cymru | Alan Lloyd Evans | 215 | | |
| Conservative | Robert James MacKinnon | 38 | | |
| Liberal Democrats hold | | Swing | | |

=== Lampeter (two seats) ===
Lampeter 2008
| Party | Candidate | Votes | % | ±% |
|---|---|---|---|---|
| Labour | Robert George Harris* | 790 | | |
| Independent | John Ivor Williams* | 575 | | |
| Independent | Dorothy Williams | 249 | | |
| Plaid Cymru | Robert Phillips | 263 | | |
| Liberal Democrats | Derek Wilson | 123 | | |
| Green | Elly Foster | 65 | | |
| Conservative | Michael Nevill James Chamberlain | 55 | | |
| Labour hold | | Swing | | |
| Independent hold | | Swing | | |

=== Llanarth (one seat) ===
Cllr. Eurfyl Evans (Lib Dem, Llanarth) was elected unopposed in 2008. He was first elected in 1995 (holding the ward from Cllr. Alan Thomas) and won re-election in 2004 by 188 votes over Plaid Cymru (31%) and in the last Cabinet (that was dissolved at the same time as the last meeting of the council) was the Cabinet member with responsibility for Economic Development

Llanarth 2008
| Party | Candidate | Votes | % | ±% |
|---|---|---|---|---|
| Liberal Democrats | Thomas Eurfyl Evans* | unopposed | | |
| Liberal Democrats hold | | Swing | | |

=== Llanbadarn Fawr Padarn (one seat) ===
Llanbadarn Fawr Padarn 2008
| Party | Candidate | Votes | % | ±% |
|---|---|---|---|---|
| Plaid Cymru | Gareth Davies | 248 | | |
| Independent | Bob Morris | 104 | | |
| Liberal Democrats | Terry Raymond Lynch | 48 | | |
| Plaid Cymru hold | | Swing | | |

=== Llanbadarn Fawr Sulien (one seat) ===
Llanbadarn Fawr Sulien 2008
| Party | Candidate | Votes | % | ±% |
|---|---|---|---|---|
| Plaid Cymru | Paul James* | 346 | | |
| Liberal Democrats | Peter Jeffery Hampson | 74 | | |
| Plaid Cymru hold | | Swing | | |

=== Llandyfriog (one seat) ===
Llandyfriog 2008
| Party | Candidate | Votes | % | ±% |
|---|---|---|---|---|
| Plaid Cymru | Benjamin Towyn Evans* | 523 | | |
| Liberal Democrats | Alex Bashford | 165 | | |
| Plaid Cymru hold | | Swing | | |

=== Llandysiliogogo (one seat) ===
Llandysiliogogo 2008
| Party | Candidate | Votes | % | ±% |
|---|---|---|---|---|
| Independent | Gareth Lloyd | 607 | | |
| Plaid Cymru | Cen Llwyd* | 309 | | |
| Independent gain from Plaid Cymru | | Swing | | |

=== Llandysul Town (one seat) ===
Llandysul Town 2008
| Party | Candidate | Votes | % | ±% |
|---|---|---|---|---|
| Independent | Evan John Keith Evans* | 404 | | |
| Plaid Cymru | Iwan William Richards | 236 | | |
| Independent hold | | Swing | | |

=== Llanfarian (one seat) ===
Alun Lloyd Jones had left the Plaid Cymru group and joined the Independents after the 1999 election. However, since the 2004 election he rejoined the party.

Llanfarian 2008
| Party | Candidate | Votes | % | ±% |
|---|---|---|---|---|
| Plaid Cymru | Alun Lloyd Jones* | 361 | | |
| Liberal Democrats | Elian Lorrae Jones-Southgate | 248 | | |
| Conservative | Llinos Ma Thomas | 41 | | |
| Plaid Cymru hold | | Swing | | |

=== Llanfihangel Ystrad (one seat) ===
Llanfihangel Ystrad 2008
| Party | Candidate | Votes | % | ±% |
|---|---|---|---|---|
| Plaid Cymru | Owen Llywelyn | 656 | | |
| Liberal Democrats | Matthew George Cooper Lewes Gee | 344 | | |
| Plaid Cymru hold | | Swing | | |

=== Llangeitho (one seat) ===
Cllr. David Evans (Plaid Cymru, Llangeitho) was elected unopposed in 2008. First elected in 1999 (gaining the seat from the Liberal Democrats as an Independent candidate) joined Plaid Cymru at the close of nominations in 2008. As an Independent member he sat on the Development Control Committee and was vice chair of the Environmental Services and Housing Committee.

Llangeitho 2008
| Party | Candidate | Votes | % | ±% |
|---|---|---|---|---|
| Plaid Cymru | David John Evans* | unopposed | | |
| Plaid Cymru gain from Independent | | Swing | | |

=== Llangybi (one seat) ===
Llangybi 2008
| Party | Candidate | Votes | % | ±% |
|---|---|---|---|---|
| Plaid Cymru | John Timothy Odwyn Davies* | 416 | | |
| Liberal Democrats | Sonia Rose Williams | 205 | | |
| Plaid Cymru hold | | Swing | | |

=== Llanrhystud (one seat) ===
Llanrhystud 2008
| Party | Candidate | Votes | % | ±% |
|---|---|---|---|---|
| Liberal Democrats | David Rowland Rees-Evans | 500 | | |
| Independent | Emyr Morgan Jones | 266 | | |
| Liberal Democrats hold | | Swing | | |

=== Llansantffraed (one seat) ===
Llansantffraed 2008
| Party | Candidate | Votes | % | ±% |
|---|---|---|---|---|
| Independent | Dafydd Wyn Edwards | 583 | | |
| Plaid Cymru | Daniel Meurig James* | 545 | | |
| Independent gain from Plaid Cymru | | Swing | | |

=== Llanwenog (one seat) ===
Llanwenog 2008
| Party | Candidate | Votes | % | ±% |
|---|---|---|---|---|
| Plaid Cymru | Samuel Haydn Richards* | 692 | | |
| Liberal Democrats | Kathy Bracy | 118 | | |
| Plaid Cymru hold | | Swing | | |

=== Lledrod (one seat) ===
Lledrod 2008
| Party | Candidate | Votes | % | ±% |
|---|---|---|---|---|
| Independent | Ifan Davies | 549 | | |
| Plaid Cymru | Catrin Myfanwy Huws | 452 | | |
| Independent hold | | Swing | | |

=== Melindwr (one seat) ===
Melindwr 2008
| Party | Candidate | Votes | % | ±% |
|---|---|---|---|---|
| Plaid Cymru | Rhodri Davies | 489 | | |
| Liberal Democrats | Fred Williams* | 432 | | |
| Plaid Cymru gain from Liberal Democrats | | Swing | | |

=== New Quay (one seat) ===
New Quay 2008
| Party | Candidate | Votes | % | ±% |
|---|---|---|---|---|
| Independent | Sarah Gillian Hopley* | 349 | | |
| Conservative | Luke William Ashley Evetts | 160 | | |
| Independent hold | | Swing | | |

=== Penbryn (one seat) ===
Penbryn 2008
| Party | Candidate | Votes | % | ±% |
|---|---|---|---|---|
| Plaid Cymru | Ian ap Dewi* | 652 | | |
| Liberal Democrats | June Perry | 244 | | |
| Plaid Cymru hold | | Swing | | |

=== Penparc (one seat) ===
Penparc 2008
| Party | Candidate | Votes | % | ±% |
|---|---|---|---|---|
| Independent | Thomas Haydn Lewis* | 667 | | |
| Plaid Cymru | David Richard James | 256 | | |
| Independent hold | | Swing | | |

=== Tirymynach (one seat) ===
Tirymynach 2008
| Party | Candidate | Votes | % | ±% |
|---|---|---|---|---|
| Liberal Democrats | Paul Buckingham James Hinge | 434 | | |
| Plaid Cymru | William Penri James* | 420 | | |
| Liberal Democrats gain from Plaid Cymru | | Swing | | |

=== Trefeurig (one seat) ===
Trefeurig 2008
| Party | Candidate | Votes | % | ±% |
|---|---|---|---|---|
| Plaid Cymru | David Suter | 461 | | |
| Liberal Democrats | Martin John Squires | 108 | | |
| Independent | Kari Walker | 99 | | |
| Plaid Cymru hold | | Swing | | |

=== Tregaron (one seat) ===
Cllr. Catherine Jane Hughes (Plaid Cymru, Tregaron) was elected in 2004 defeating an Independent candidate by 35 votes (5%) and was vice chair of the Social Service Committee as well as serving on the Development Control Committee and Education Committee.

Tregaron 2008
| Party | Candidate | Votes | % | ±% |
|---|---|---|---|---|
| Plaid Cymru | Catherine Jane Hughes* | unopposed | | |
| Plaid Cymru hold | | Swing | | |

=== Troedyraur (one seat) ===
Troedyraur 2008
| Party | Candidate | Votes | % | ±% |
|---|---|---|---|---|
| Independent | Roy Griffiths Lloyd | 381 | | |
| Plaid Cymru | Gerallt Wynford Jones* | 151 | | |
| Independent gain from Plaid Cymru | | Swing | | |

=== Ystwyth (one seat) ===
Ystwyth 2008
| Party | Candidate | Votes | % | ±% |
|---|---|---|---|---|
| Liberal Democrats | John David Rowland Jones* | 528 | | |
| Plaid Cymru | Sian Mererid Archer | 196 | | |
| Green | Leila Kiersch | 74 | | |
| Liberal Democrats hold | | Swing | | |

== By-elections 2008-12 ==
=== Aberystwyth Rheidol 2008 ===
A by-election was held in the Aberystwyth Rheidol ward following the resignation of Liberal Democrat councillor Eric Griffiths.

Aberystwyth Rheidol by-election, 10 July 2008
| Party | Candidate | Votes | % | ±% |
|---|---|---|---|---|
| Plaid Cymru | John Aled Davies | 271 | 40.2 | |
| Liberal Democrats | | 252 | 37.4 | |
| Independent | | 98 | 14.5 | |
| Labour | | 36 | 5.3 | |
| Conservative | | 17 | 2.5 | |
| Majority | | | | |
| Turnout | | | | |
| Registered electors | | | | |
| Plaid Cymru gain from Liberal Democrats | | Swing | | |
