= 1987 Ceredigion District Council election =

1987 Welsh local election

An election to Ceredigion District Council was held in May 1987. It was preceded by the 1983 election and followed by the 1991 election. On the same day there were elections to the other district local authorities and community councils in Wales.

== Boundary Changes ==
There were a number of boundary changes with other wards being renamed.

== Results ==
=== Aberaeron (one seat) ===
Aberaeron 1987
Party	Candidate	Votes	%	±%
Independent	J.A. Rees*	unopposed		
Independent hold				

=== Aberporth (one seat) ===
Aberporth 1987
Party	Candidate	Votes	%	±%
Independent	William James Granville Varney	499		
Liberal	C.O.J. Evans	284		
Independent	G.M. Harries	226		
Independent hold		Swing		

=== Aberystwyth East (two seats) ===
Aberystwyth East 1987
Party	Candidate	Votes	%	±%
Plaid Cymru	Hywel Griffiths Evans*	621		
Plaid Cymru	Gareth Butler	333		
Alliance (Liberal)	J.R. Thomas	265		
Independent	Hywel Thomas Jones	246		
Labour	D.C.K.T. Edwards	126		
Plaid Cymru win (new seat)				
Plaid Cymru win (new seat)				

=== Aberystwyth North (two seats) ===
Aberystwyth North 1987
Party	Candidate	Votes	%	±%
Alliance (Liberal)	M. Jones*	740		
Alliance (Liberal)	Ceredig Jones*	572		
Green	C.G.B. Simpson	471		
Alliance win (new seat)				
Alliance win (new seat)				

=== Aberystwyth South (two seats) ===
Aberystwyth South 1987
Party	Candidate	Votes	%	±%
Alliance (SDP)	Llewellyn Goronwy Edwards*	997		
Labour	Colin H. Evans*	727		
Alliance (SDP)	Owen Henry Jones*	676		
Alliance win (new seat)				
Labour win (new seat)				

=== Aberystwyth West (two seats) ===
Aberystwyth West 1987
Party	Candidate	Votes	%	±%
Labour	Thomas Elwyn Williams*	808		
Plaid Cymru	R. Davies	417		
Alliance (Liberal)	Mrs E.M. Griffiths	403		
Independent	Mona Rachel Morris	383		
Labour win (new seat)				
Plaid Cymru win (new seat)				

=== Beulah (one seat) ===
Beulah 1987
Party	Candidate	Votes	%	±%
Independent	John Elfed Davies*	unopposed		
Independent hold				

=== Borth (one seat) ===
Borth 1987
Party	Candidate	Votes	%	±%
Independent	William Thomas Kinsey Raw-Rees*	unopposed		
Independent hold				

=== Capel Dewi (one seat) ===
Capel Dewi 1987
Party	Candidate	Votes	%	±%
Independent	Thomas John Jones*	unopposed		
Independent hold				

=== Cardigan (three seats) ===
Ivor Radley stood as an Independent in 1983

Cardigan 1987
Party	Candidate	Votes	%	±%
Independent	John Bertram Evans*	1,018		
Independent	Sandra Williams	1,003		
Liberal	I.J.C. Radley*	977		
Independent	O.M. Owen*	890		
Independent	J.O. Evans	428		
Independent hold		Swing		
Independent hold		Swing		
Liberal gain from Independent		Swing		

=== Ceulanamaesmawr (one seat) ===
Ceulanamaesmawr 1987
Party	Candidate	Votes	%	±%
Independent	John Rowland Davies*	536		
Plaid Cymru	Harry James	343		
Independent hold		Swing		

=== Ciliau Aeron (one seat) ===
Williams had stood as a Liberal in 1983.

Ciliau Aeron 1987
Party	Candidate	Votes	%	±%
Independent	Evan Evans Williams*	unopposed		
Independent gain from Liberal				

=== Faenor (one seat) ===
Faenor 1987
Party	Candidate	Votes	%	±%
Alliance	Peredur Wynne Eklund	443		
Independent	Mrs E.A.M. Andrews	351		
Labour	C.N. Edwards	78		
Alliance gain from Independent		Swing		

=== Lampeter (two seats) ===
Lampeter 1987
Party	Candidate	Votes	%	±%
Independent	J.R. Evans*	723		
Alliance	Cecilia P. Barton*	698		
Independent	J.I. Williams	645		
Green	R.P. Jones	328		
Independent hold		Swing		
Alliance hold		Swing		

=== Llanarth (one seat) ===
Thomas stood as an Independent in 1983.

Llanarth 1987
Party	Candidate	Votes	%	±%
Alliance	Alan Thomas*	unopposed		
Alliance gain from Independent				

=== Llanbadarn Fawr (two seats) ===
Llanbadarn Fawr 1987
Party	Candidate	Votes	%	±%
Independent	J.R. Evans*	unopposed		
Alliance	J.T. Todd	unopposed		
Independent win (new seat)				
Alliance win (new seat)				

=== Llandyfriog (one seat) ===
Llandyfriog 1987
Party	Candidate	Votes	%	±%
Independent	Lyndon Lloyd Jones*	unopposed		
Independent hold				

=== Llandysiliogogo (one seat) ===
Llandysiliogogo 1987
Party	Candidate	Votes	%	±%
Independent	J.E. Evans*	632		
Independent	A.E. Owen	244		
Independent hold		Swing		

=== Llandysul Town (one seat) ===
Llandysul Town 1987
Party	Candidate	Votes	%	±%
Independent	E.J. Keith Evans*	unopposed		
Independent hold				

=== Llanfarian (one seat) ===
Morgan stood as an Independent in 1983

Llanfarian 1987
Party	Candidate	Votes	%	±%
Liberal	A Morgan*	249		
Independent	J.G. Parry-Jones	192		
Liberal gain from Independent		Swing		

=== Llanfihangel Ystrad (one seat) ===
Llanfihangel Ystrad 1987
Party	Candidate	Votes	%	±%
Liberal	W.A. Jones*	unopposed		
Independent hold		Swing		

=== Llangeitho (one seat) ===
Llangeitho 1987
Party	Candidate	Votes	%	±%
Liberal	Hannah Marion Jones*	554		
Green	K.T.B. Hodd	195		
Majority				
Liberal hold		Swing		

=== Llangybi (one seat) ===
Llangybi 1987
Party	Candidate	Votes	%	±%
Independent	Johnny Williams*	unopposed		
Independent hold		Swing		

=== Llanrhystud (one seat) ===
Llanrhystud 1987
Party	Candidate	Votes	%	±%
Liberal	William Richard Edwards*	483		
Independent	E.M. Jones	259		
Liberal hold		Swing		

=== Llansantffraed (one seat) ===
Llansantffraed 1987
Party	Candidate	Votes	%	±%
Independent	L. Lloyd*	629		
Independent	E.L. Jones	331		
Plaid Cymru	T.F. Jones	157		
Independent hold		Swing		

=== Llanwenog (one seat) ===
Llanwenog 1987
Party	Candidate	Votes	%	±%
Independent	D. Alun James*	unopposed		
Independent hold		Swing		

=== Lledrod (one seat) ===
Morgan had stood as an Independent in 1983.

Lledrod 1987
Party	Candidate	Votes	%	±%
Liberal	M.J. Morgan*	unopposed		
Liberal gain from Independent		Swing		

=== Melindwr (one seat) ===
Melindwr 1987
Party	Candidate	Votes	%	±%
Independent	E.H. Evans*	unopposed		
Independent hold		Swing		

=== New Quay (one seat) ===
New Quay 1987
Party	Candidate	Votes	%	±%
Independent	I.C. Pursey*	unopposed		
Independent hold		Swing		

=== Penbryn (one seat) ===
Penbryn 1987
Party	Candidate	Votes	%	±%
Liberal	E.T. Jenner*	unopposed		
Liberal hold		Swing		

=== Penparc (one seat) ===
Penparc 1987
Party	Candidate	Votes	%	±%
Independent	T.H. Lewis*			
Independent	T.M. George	365		
Alliance	L.W. Lovegrove	70		
Independent hold		Swing		

=== Tirymynach (one seat) ===
Tirymynach 1987
Party	Candidate	Votes	%	±%
Plaid Cymru	Hywel Wyn Jones*	unopposed		
Plaid Cymru hold		Swing		

=== Trefeurig (one seat) ===
Trefeurig 1987
Party	Candidate	Votes	%	±%
Independent	T.A. Thomas*	unopposed		
Independent hold		Swing		

=== Tregaron (one seat) ===
Tregaron 1987
Party	Candidate	Votes	%	±%
Independent	W.G. Bennett*	unopposed		
Independent hold		Swing		

=== Troedyraur (one seat) ===
Troedyraur 1987
Party	Candidate	Votes	%	±%
Independent	J.D. Thomas	294		
Independent	Rev S.I. Evans*	263		
Independent hold		Swing		

=== Ystwyth one seat) ===
Ystwyth 1987
Party	Candidate	Votes	%	±%
Liberal	J.D.R. Jones*	717		
Independent	M. Newman	86		
Majority				
Liberal hold		Swing		
