= Swyddfa'r Sir =

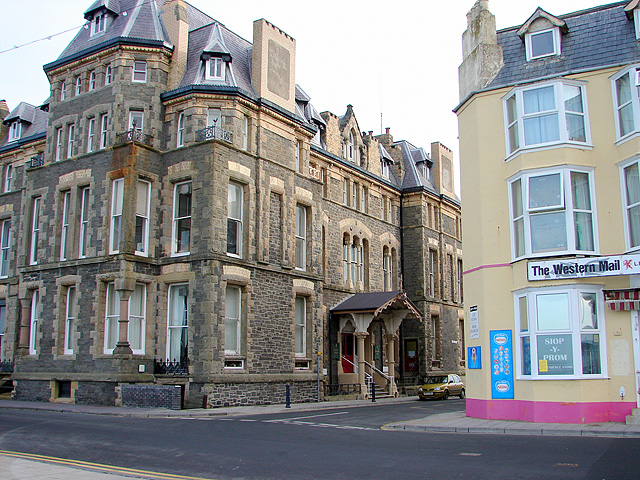
- The then entrance to the then Register office, February 2009
- Interactive map of the Swyddfa'r Sir area
- Former names: Queen's Hotel (1866–1950)
- Alternative names: County Council Offices (1950–2009)

General information
- Status: Unoccupied, For Sale
- Type: Hotel/Offices
- Architectural style: Hôtel de Ville
- Location: Marine Terrace, Albert Place, SY23 2DE, Aberystwyth, Wales
- Coordinates: 52.420111°N 4.084532°W
- Opened: 1866
- Closed: 2012
- Client: Hafod Hotel Company
- Owner: Ceredigion County Council

Technical details
- Material: Dressed local stone Mansard roof made from Welsh slate
- Floor count: 5 (1xbasement, 1xground floor, 3xupper floors)
- Floor area: 51,200 square feet (4,760 m^{2})
- Grounds: 0.332 acres (0.134 ha)

Design and construction
- Architect: C. Forster Hayward
- Architecture firm: Hayward & Davis
- Main contractor: George Lumley
- Awards: Grade II listed

Other information
- Parking: Queen's Yard: 0.342 acres (0.138 ha)

Swyddfa'r Sir (Welsh for 'county office') is a Grade II listed former hotel, former main offices of Ceredigion County Council and former Magistrates Court building located in Aberystwyth, well known as the outside of the police station in the BBC Wales police television series Y Gwyll (Hinterland).

== History ==
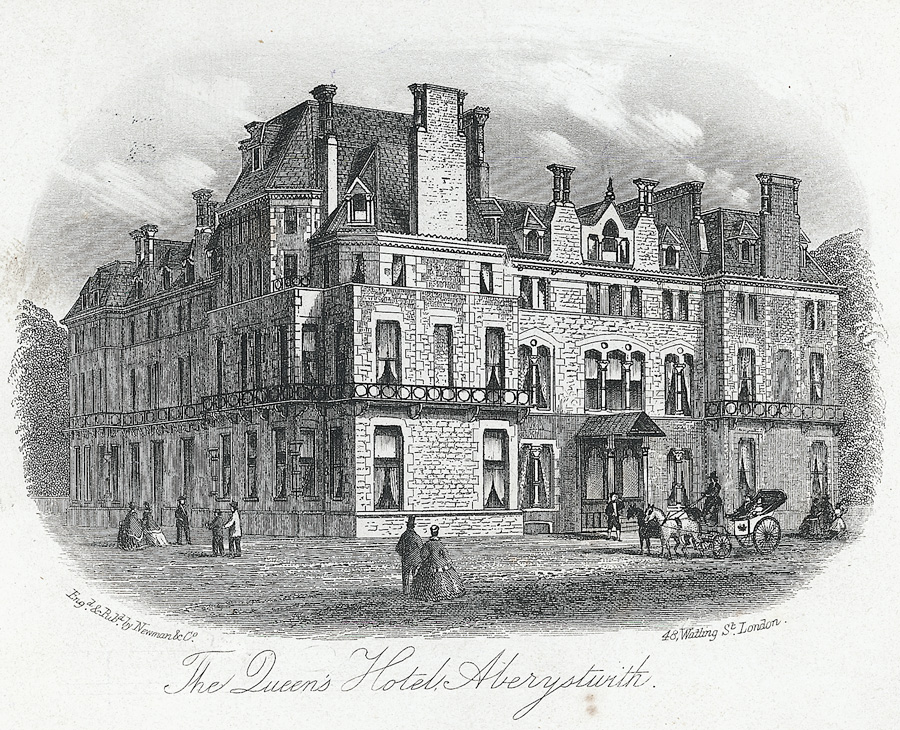
The Queen's Hotel, circa 1860

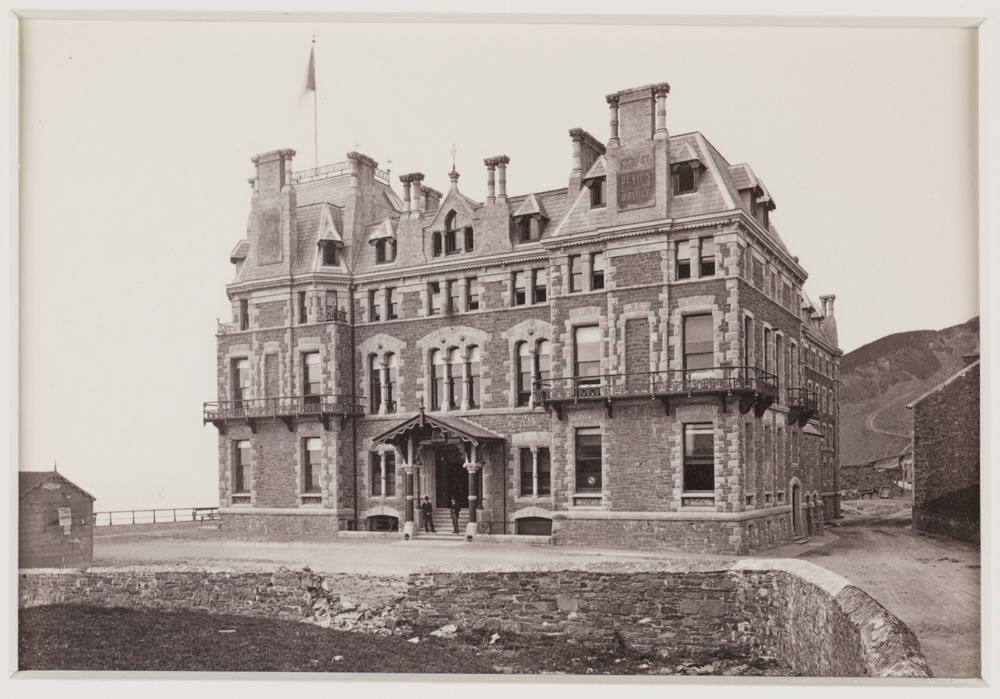
The Queen's Hotel, circa 1880, taken by Francis Bedford(1816–1894). From the collection of the National Media Museum

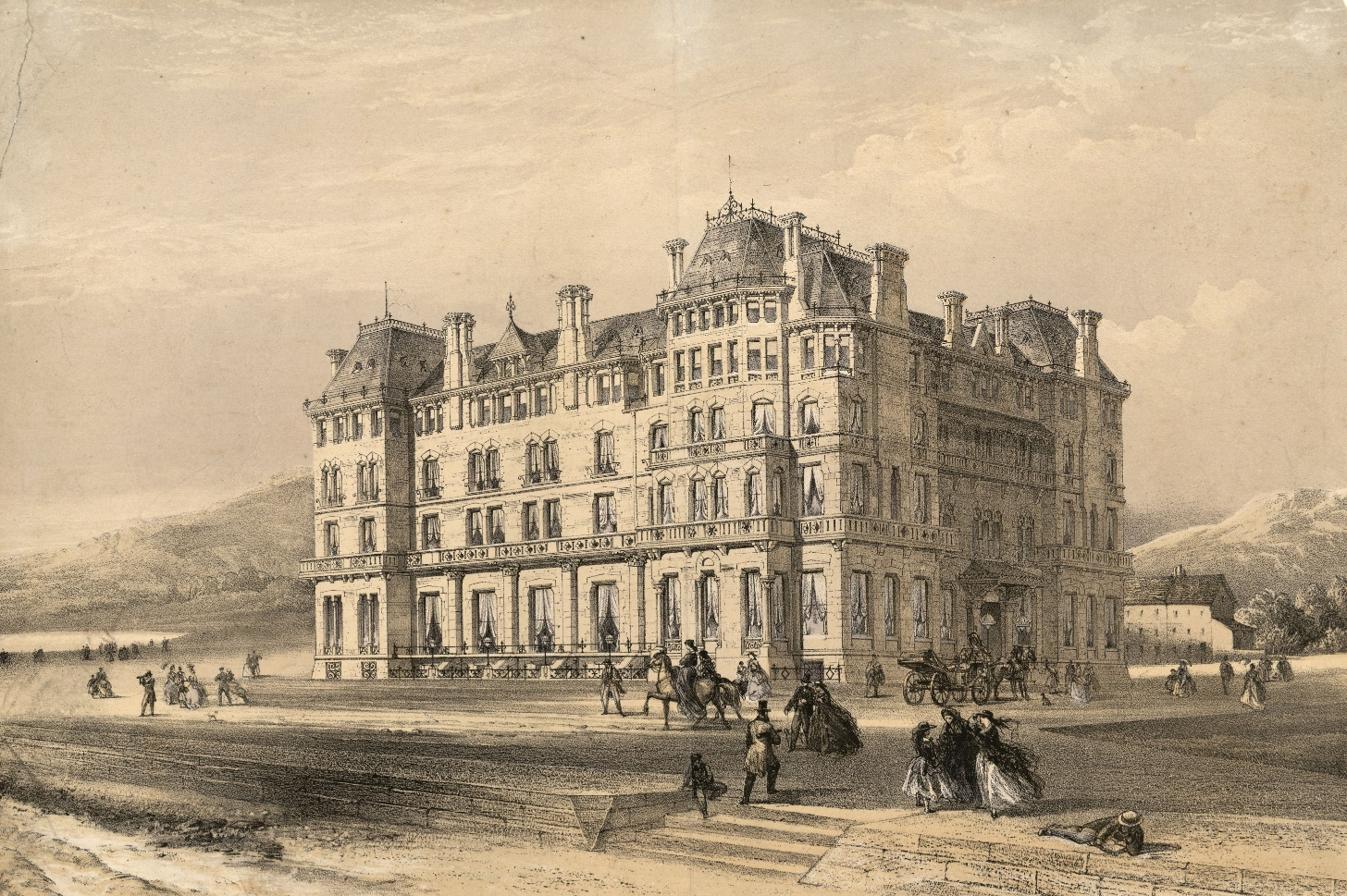
The Queen's Hotel, circa 1875

Originally constructed as a detached hotel on the town's seafront, it was opened in 1866 by the Hafod Hotel Company as the "Queen's Hotel". Designed by C. Forster Hayward of Hayward & Davis in the then popular symmetrical Hôtel de Ville style, it was a smaller-scale version of his earlier 1863 Duke of Cornwall Hotel in Plymouth. The five storey premises – basement, ground floor plus three upper floors – created a total floor area of 51,200 square feet (4,760 m^{2}), providing 83 bedrooms. Built by George Lumley of Aberystwyth, the dressed stone exterior was capped by a Mansard roof of locally sourced Welsh slate. Internally, the main entrance in a gothic architecture style led to a staircase, lit from above by a stained glass window in the mezzanine. The entrance area also included access to an early passenger lift, and the ballroom. Many of the main spaces included acanthus plaster ceilings, whilst other public areas were faced with quartz and ore panels. The ground floor toilets presently remain intact, equipped with the original ceramic sinks and brass taps.

Commandeered as the local Royal Air Force base and accommodation unit during the Second World War, Aberystwyth Council purchased the building post-war, and after conversion under County Architect G. R. Bruce, used the building from 1950 onwards. Due to the space available, during the council's period of occupation the building was additionally used for periods of time as: a dentistry; emergency evacuation hospital; a police station; a register office for weddings; an Aberystwyth University lecture theatre; and the county archives. The local circuit Magistrates Court later moved into the building, using the former ballroom as their main court.

Ceredigion County Council moved to the newly built Canolfan Rheidol in mid-2009, with the court remaining until 2012. In December 2013 the council placed the unoccupied building up for sale at £1million, under chartered surveyors Cooke & Arkwright. After it did not sell, the council chose in June 2014 to put the building up for public auction.

The building was subsequently sold for £530,000 and was being converted by Hawkstone Ltd into a spa hotel that would also have 20 luxury flats and 19 studio apartments for rent. The developers expected to spend £5 million on the renovation.

== Y Gwyll (Hinterland) ==
From April 2013, the Welsh television production company Fiction Factory started filming the police television series Y Gwyll (Hinterland), starring Richard Harrington. Filmed in both Welsh and English, the Welsh version was broadcast on S4C from October 2013, the bilingual on BBC One Wales from January 2014 and BBC Four from March 2014. Shot over a 124-day period in and around Aberystwyth and the surrounding Ceredigion region, the unoccupied building acted as both the series production offices, and the external face of Swyddfa'r Sir serves as the outside of the series' fictional police station. In light of the building's proposed sale, the production company requested access for the second series, which was to be filmed starting in September 2014. Only the exterior was used for filming of that second series.
