= Aberystwyth Rural District =

Welsh district (1894–1974)

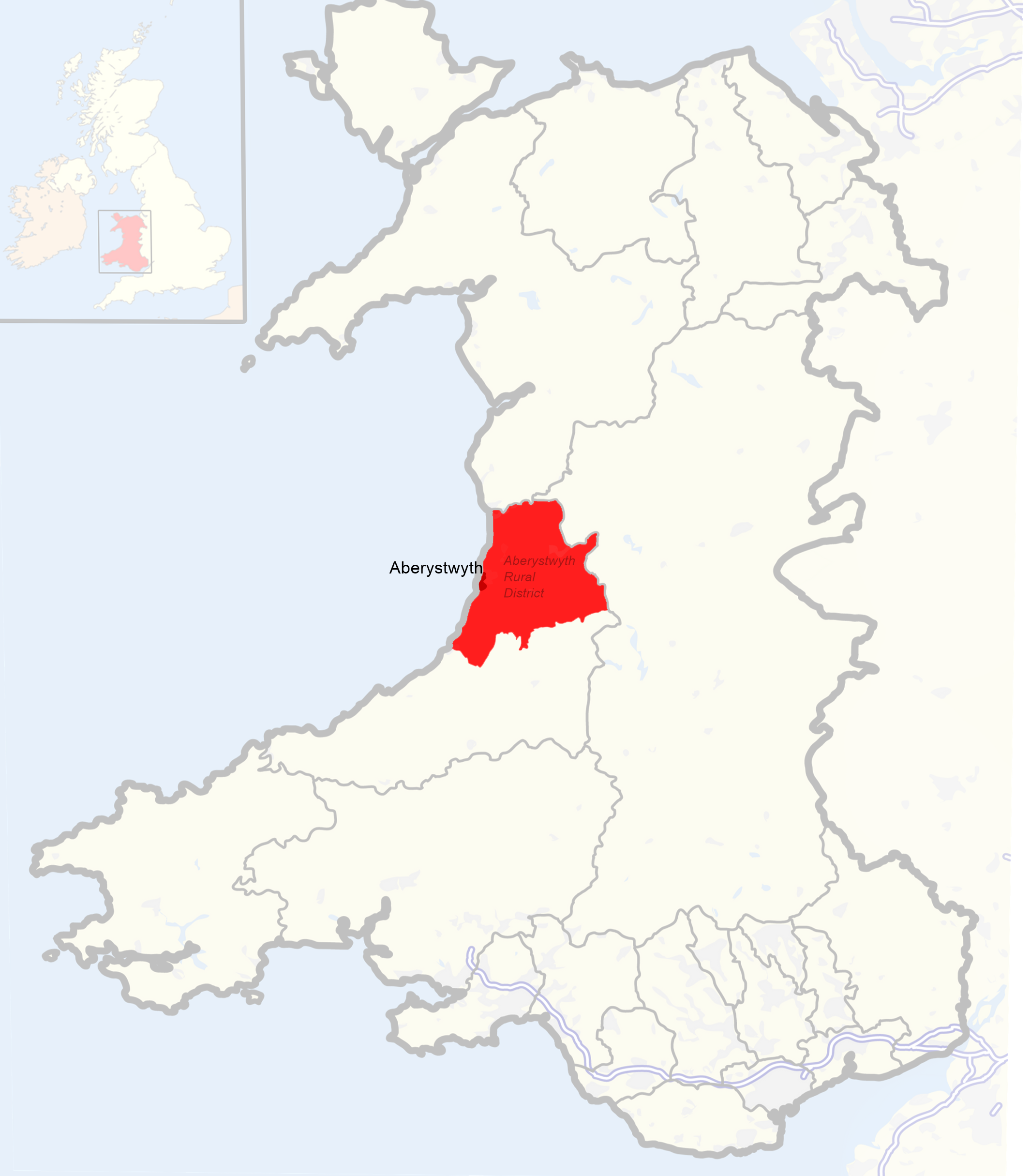
Aberystwyth Rural District as it appeared in 1973

Aberystwyth Rural District was a local authority in Wales created in 1894. The inaugural elections to the authority were held in December 1894.

The Rural District covered all parishes in north Cardiganshire outside the borough of Aberystwyth. Details and minutes of the district are held in the National Library of Wales in Aberystwyth.

The authority was abolished following local government re-organization in 1974.
