= J. Geraint Jenkins =

British historian and curator (1929–2009)

John Geraint Jenkins (1929 – 15 August 2009) was a native Welsh speaker, maritime historian and historian of rural crafts.

== Early life, education and career ==
Jenkins was born in 1929 into a Welsh-speaking "seafaring" family based near Llangrannog in Ceredigion; he attended the village school and Cardigan Grammar School, before completing his university education at the University Colleges of Wales at Swansea and Aberystwyth.

He graduated from the University of Wales, Aberystwyth in 1950 with a degree in geography and anthropology, and then completed a master's degree there under E. G. Bowen and Alwyn J. Rees. He worked at a museum in Leicester from 1952 to 1953, when he was appointed Assistant Keeper at the Museum of English Rural Life in Reading, which came with a part-time lectureship at the University of Reading (which housed the museum). In 1960, he returned to Wales as Assistant Keeper of the Welsh Folk Museum at St Fagans, and nine years later he secured promotion as Keeper of Material Culture. He then moved in 1977 to the Welsh Industrial and Maritime Museum in Cardiff, to be closer to the sea and his interest in maritime history; he regarded the decade he spent there as the happiest of his career. In 1981, the University of Wales conferred on him a doctor of science degree. But his move back to St Fagans and the Folk Museum in 1987 to be its Curator was less happy, owing in part to clashes with management and what Jenkins regarded as English interference. He retired early in 1992, and moved to Penbryn. He was the High Sheriff of Dyfed in 1994–95 and joined Ceredigion County Council, serving as its chairman in 2002–03.

== Death and legacy ==
Jenkins died on 15 August 2009, leaving a widow, Nansi, and two sons; another son, had died in 2000. According to his obituary in The Independent, "Geraint Jenkins played a leading role in the preservation and interpretation of the maritime history of Wales. He published more than 50 books, many to do with the seafaring traditions of west Wales, and was an acknowledged authority on the subject. He also made expert studies of other aspects of Welsh folk life, including traditional farm implements, rural crafts, the woollen industry and Cardiff ship-owners."

== Selected works ==
- The English Farm Wagon (1961)
- The Welsh Woollen Industry (1969)
- Crefftwyr Gwlad [Country Craftsmen] (1971)
- Nets and Coracles (1974)
- Life and Tradition in Rural Wales (1976)
- The Inshore Fishermen of Wales (1991)
- Traddodiad y Môr [The Maritime Tradition] (2004)
- Welsh Ships and Sailing Men (2005)
- Ar Lan Hen Afon [On the Bank of an Old River] (2005)
- Y Cwrwgl [The Coracle] (2006)
