= Artwork title =

Name given to a work of art

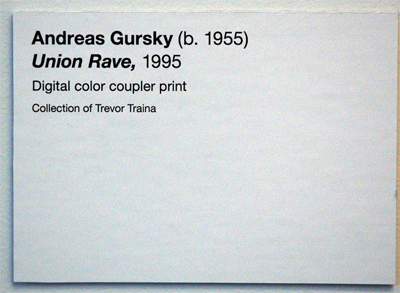
One can find the title of an artwork in a museum label

In art, a title is a word or phrase used to identify and distinguish a particular work of art. These titles can be descriptive, indicative of the content or theme of the work, or they can be more abstract and open to interpretation. Titles can be designated by the artists themselves, or by curators or other third parties, and can affect reception and interpretation.

Traditionally, only works of art in the fine arts are titled, but convenient descriptive titles may be needed for works in the decorative arts, for cataloging, museum labels and similar fields.

It may be discovered or argued that the subject of a work has been wrongly identified. A painting by Titian has been argued to show both Salome or Judith with the Head of Holofernes. The Arnolfini Portrait by Jan van Eyck in the National Gallery has been given several different titles by the museum over recent decades, as opinions as to the nature of the occasion and the people shown have changed.

== History and curation ==
In the ancient world, artworks were not typically given a proper title, the identification of something like a cult image being self-evident in a particular sociocultural context, akin to the concept of the Poor Man's Bible. They were sometimes inscribed by epigraphy with the signature of the artist and/or the subject of the piece such as a titulus, but a titulus served simple utilitarian functions and was not a true title. Subsequent art history, beginning with Pliny's chapters that gave common names to works such as by Praxiteles.

The relatively small group of narrative religious subjects in Western medieval art were and are referred to by the standard names for an event shown, and used in theological and devotional literature. The need for an agreed-upon title only emerged in a Western context in the 18th century, with more secular subjects, and more printed literature of art criticism, and Age of Enlightenment cataloging of the first museums and first exhibitions.

In modern times, titles of artworks are usually chosen by the artist. They can also have been assigned by galleries, private collectors, printmakers, art dealers, or curators, this historical process being the subject of a book by Ruth Yeazell. Some works are titled with a simple descriptive phrase, for example The Train in the Snow by Claude Monet or Sunflowers by Vincent van Gogh. Other works may use more abstract or symbolic titles, for example The Scream by Edvard Munch or The Persistence of Memory by Salvador Dalí. The onomastician Adrian Room compiled an encyclopedic dictionary in this area. John C. Welchman has written Invisible Colors as a critical history of modern titles, after an aphorism by Marcel Duchamp.

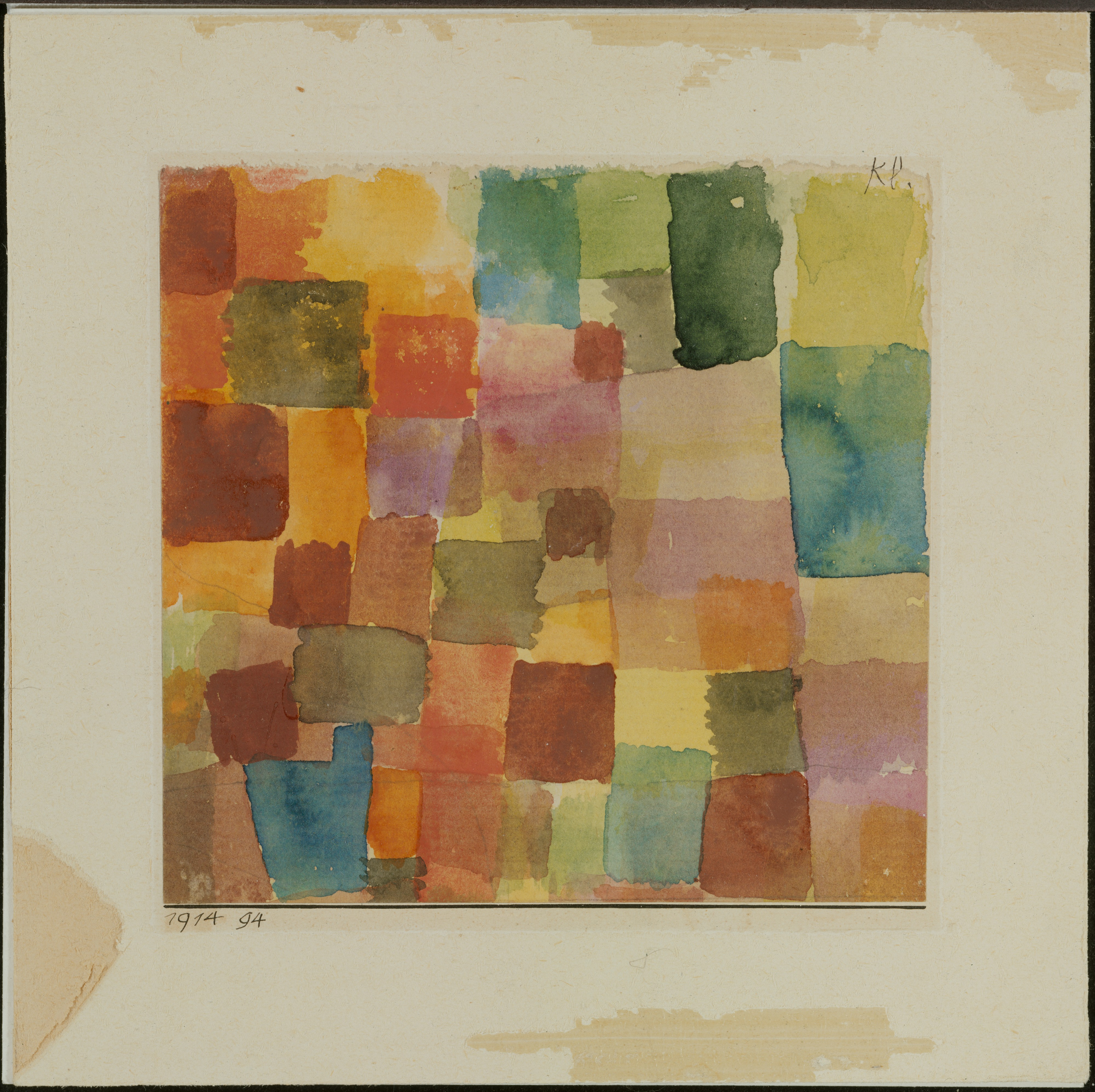
Untitled by Paul Klee (1914)

Some artworks have had their museum label names changed as new art history research emerges or as a modification of an offensive or pejorative name. Curating institutions are responsible for thorough documentation of all title variants, including translations of an artwork title into one or more languages. As a proper title is considered the default for modern works, others may be designated "Untitled" (by secondary sources or by the artist as a conscious choice), and are sometimes also assigned a parenthetical name for clarity.

From Gustave Courbet's L'Origine du monde (1866), to Marcel Duchamp's Fountain (1916) and L.H.O.O.Q. (1919), to Freytag-Loringhoven and Schamberg's God (1917), to Maurizio Cattelan's America (2016), artists have used artwork titles to provide additional meaning and/or context to their works of art.

== Art criticism ==
The title of a work of art can have an impact on its reception and aesthetic interpretation, and can also be an aspect of the artist's overall vision for the piece. This can be particularly the case for abstract art. In some cases, the title of a work of art may be a quote or homage to another work of art or literature. Conversely, ekphrastic literature often repurposes the title of an artwork.

Philosophically, Jacques Derrida compared an artwork's title to a parergon and considered it similarly to a simulacrum, and Jean-Luc Nancy took a comparable approach. The title of a work of art is a part of its identity and can influence its reception and interpretation by audiences, as noted by art critic Arthur Danto, who made a thought experiment of a particular abstract mural being named after either the first or third of Newton's laws of motion; however, titles can be more impactful on the interpretation of some works than others.

== See also ==
- Art name
- List of artworks known in English by a foreign title
