= List of works known in English by a foreign title =

The following is an alphabetical list of works of art that are often called by a non-English name in an English context. (Of course, many such titles are simply the names of people: Don Quixote, Irma la Douce, Madame Bovary, Tosca, Pelléas et Mélisande. These have been omitted, as have examples where the English may easily be inferred: Symphonie fantastique, Les liaisons dangereuses.)

Title	Transcription	Language	Translation	Description
99 Luftballons		German	99 Balloons	song by Nena
À la recherche du temps perdu		French	In Search of Lost Time	novel by Marcel Proust
Aberystwyth Mon Amour		French	Aberystwyth My Love	novel by Malcolm Pryce
Aina	آئینہ	Urdu	Mirror	film directed by Nazr-ul-Islam
Alhambra	الْحَمْرَاء	Arabic	The Red One	Muslim monument, located near Granada, Spain
Angkor Wat	អង្គរវត្ត	Khmer	temple complex of the city	Hindu and (later) Buddhist temple site, located in Angkor, Cambodia
Arthashastra	अर्थशास्त्रम्	Sanskrit	"science of politics" or "science of material gain"	treatise on statecraft, economic policy and military strategy
Autobahn		German	Motorway	album and song by Kraftwerk
Bal		Turkish	Honey	film by Semih Kaplanoğlu
Barcarolle: une nuit à Lisbonne		French	Barcarolle: A Night in Lisbon	symphonic poem by Camille Saint-Saëns
Bhagavad Gita	भगवद्गीता	Sanskrit	Song of God	philosophical, Hindu book of poems (author contentious)
Carmina Burana		Latin	Songs from Beuern	medieval book of poems and a cantata by Carl Orff
Cavalleria rusticana		Italian	Rustic Chivalry	opera by Pietro Mascagni
Chichen Itza		Yucatec Maya	At the Mouth of the Well of the Itza	Mayan monument, located on the Yucatán Peninsula, Mexico
Commentarii de Bello Gallico		Latin	Commentaries on the Gallic War	Julius Caesar's firsthand account of the Gallic Wars
Codex Gigas		Latin	Giant Book	largest medieval manuscript in the world, the authorship is attributed to Hermann Inanclus (Herman, the Recluse), a monk
Così fan tutte		Italian	That's What They [feminine] All Do	opera by Wolfgang Amadeus Mozart
Dai Miao	岱庙	Chinese	Dai Temple	Daoist temple complex, located on Mount Tai, People's Republic of China
Dàin do Eimhir		Scottish Gaelic	Poems to Eimhir	Sequence of poems by Sorley MacLean
Dao De Jing	道德经/道德經	Chinese	Way/Path, Virtue, Guideline	philosophical, Daoist book of poems probably by Laozi
Das Boot		German	The Boat	film directed by Wolfgang Petersen
Das Hildebrandslied		German	Lay/Song of Hildebrand	heroic lay, written in Old High German
Das Kapital		German	Capital	treatise by Karl Marx
Das klagende Lied		German	The Lamentation	cantata by Gustav Mahler
Das Lied von der Erde		German	The Song of the Earth	symphony by Gustav Mahler
De Leeuw van Vlaanderen		Dutch	The Lion of Flanders	book by Hendrik Conscience
Déjeuner sur l'herbe		French	Lunch on the Grass	painting by Édouard Manet
De re publica		Latin	On the State	philosophical hexalogy by Cicero
De rerum natura		Latin	On the Nature of Things	philosophical didactic poem by Lucretius
De vita Caesarum		Latin	About the Life of the Caesars	collection of biographies by Suetonius
Der Freischütz		German	The Freeshooter or The Marksman	opera by Carl Maria von Weber
Der Hölle Rache kocht in meinem Herzen		German	Hell's vengeance boils in my heart	aria by Wolfgang Amadeus Mozart
Der Ring des Nibelungen		German	The Ring of the Nibelung	cycle of four operas by Richard Wagner
Der Schauspieldirektor		German	The Impresario	Singspiel by Wolfgang Amadeus Mozart
Der Wehrwolf		German	a portmanteau and word play, combining the words for "defence" and "wolf" to Wehrwolf, similar to werewolf	book by Hermann Löns
Desafinado		Portuguese	Out of Tune	song by Antônio Carlos Jobim
Deus Ex		Latin	God out of	video game-series by Eidos Interactive
Die Entführung aus dem Serail		German	The Abduction from the Seraglio	opera by Wolfgang Amadeus Mozart
Die Fledermaus		German	The Bat	operetta by Johann Strauss II
Die glückliche Hand		German	The Lucky Hand	musical drama by Arnold Schoenberg
Die Mensch-Maschine		German	The Man-Machine	album by Kraftwerk
Die schöne Müllerin		German	The Fair Maid of the Mill	song cycle by Franz Schubert
Die Verbannten Kinder Evas		German	The Banished Children of Eve	album from the Austrian band of the same name
Dies irae		Latin	Day of Wrath	hymn by Thomas of Celano and part of the Requiem
Don Quichotte à Dulcinée		French	Don Quixote to Dulcinea	song cycle by Maurice Ravel
Dorvyzhy	Дорвыжы	Udmurt	"homeland roots" or "homeland generation"	Udmurt literary national epic
Edda	Óðr	Old Norse	Poetry	Eddur (plural of Edda) are the Poetic Edda (author unknown) and Prose Edda (by Snorri Sturluson), are two Icelandic ancient books
Eine kleine Nachtmusik		German	A Little Night-Music	serenade by Wolfgang Amadeus Mozart
El amor brujo		Spanish	Love, the Magician	ballet by Manuel de Falla
El Cielo		Spanish	The sky/heaven	album by dredg
El cóndor pasa		Spanish	The Condor Passes	song by Daniel Alomía Robles and Julio Baudouin
El Shaddai	אל שדי	Hebrew	"God Almighty" (loosely translated)	video game by Ignition Entertainment
Elfen Lied		German	Elf Song	manga and anime-series by Lynn Okamoto
Eroica		Italian	Heroic	symphony by Ludwig van Beethoven
Erlkönig		German	"The Alder King" or "The King of the Elves"	poem by Johann Wolfgang von Goethe
Erwartung		German	Expectation	opera by Arnold Schoenberg
Fātata te Miti		Tahitian	By the Sea	painting by Paul Gauguin
Fetih 1453		Turkish	Conquest 1453	film by Faruk Aksoy
Feuer frei!		German	"free to fire!" (German military language for "fire at will")	song by Rammstein
Gesta Danorum		Latin	Deeds of the Danes	series of books by Saxo Grammaticus
Gitanjali	গীতাঞ্জলি	Bengali	"An offering of songs" or "prayer offering of songs"	collection of poems by Rabindranath Tagore
Giv'at Halfon Eina Ona	גבעת חלפון אינה עונה	Hebrew	Halfon Hill Doesn't Answer	film by Assi Dayan
Götterdämmerung		German	Twilight of the Gods	opera by Richard Wagner
Gurrelieder		German	Songs of Gurre	oratorio by Arnold Schoenberg
Hagia Sophia	Ἅγια Σοφία	Greek	Divine Wisdom	Byzantine dome-church (now a mosque), located in Istanbul, Turkey
Harakiri	腹切り	Japanese	Harakiri/cutting the belly	film by Masaki Kobayashi
Häxan		Swedish	Witches	film by Benjamin Christensen
Heimskringla		Old Norse	The World-Circle	Kings' saga by Snorri Sturluson
Hiroshima mon amour		French	Hiroshima My Love	film directed by Alain Resnais
Huis clos		French	In Camera	play by Jean-Paul Sartre
Ich will		German	I want	song by Rammstein
Ikiru	生きる	Japanese	To Live	film directed by Akira Kurosawa
Il trovatore		Italian	The Troubadour	opera by Giuseppe Verdi
Ilias	Ἰλιάς	Ancient Greek	"Trojan" or "Troas"	epic poem, attributed to Homer
Jeux d'enfants		French	Children's Games	symphonic suite by Georges Bizet
Jewang Ungi	제왕운기	Korean	Rhymed Chronicles of Sovereigns	poem by Yi Seung-hyu
Kaaba	الكعبة	Arabic	The Cube	most sacred site in Islam, located in Mecca, Saudi Arabia
Kagemusha	影武者	Japanese	Shadow Warrior	film directed by Akira Kurosawa
Kalevala		Finnish	Lands of Kaleva	epic poem by Elias Lönnrot
Kalevipoeg		Estonian	Kalev's Son	epic poem by Friedrich Reinhold Kreutzwald
Kama Sutra	कामसूत्र	Sanskrit	Verses of Desire	ancient book about human sexual behavior by Vātsyāyana
Katamari Damacy	塊魂	Japanese	Clump Soul	video game by Namco
Kebra Nagast	ክብረ ነገሥት	Ge'ez	Glory of Kings	Ethiopian's national epic
Keine Lust		German	No Desire (German idiom for "I don't feel like it.")	song by Rammstein
Kindertotenlieder		German	Songs of Dead Children	song cycle by Gustav Mahler
Kraftwerk		German	Power Station	debut album by Kraftwerk
Kremlin	Кремль	Russian	Fortress	historic fortified complex at the heart of Moscow, Russia
Kundun	སྐུ་མདུན་	Tibetan	The Presence	film directed by Martin Scorsese
La Bohème		French	The Bohemian	opera by Giacomo Puccini
La création du monde		French	The Creation of the World	ballet by Darius Milhaud
La cucaracha		Spanish	The Cockroach	traditional song
La dame aux camélias		French	The Lady of the Camellias	novel by Alexandre Dumas, fils
La Damoiselle élue		French	The Blessed Damozel	cantata by Claude Debussy after poem by Dante Gabriel Rossetti
La Dolce Vita		Italian	The Sweet Life	film directed by Federico Fellini
La finta giardiniera		Italian	The Pretend Garden-Girl	opera by Wolfgang Amadeus Mozart
La mer		French	The Sea	three symphonic sketches for orchestra by Claude Debussy
La notte		Italian	The Night	film by Michelangelo Antonioni
La strada		Italian	The Road	film by Federico Fellini
La traviata		Italian	The Fallen Woman	opera by Giuseppe Verdi
La Vie en rose		French	Rose-Tinted Life	song by Louis Guglielmi and Édith Piaf
Lāčplēsis		Latvian	Bear-slayer	epic poem by Andrejs Pumpurs
Lacrimosa		Latin	"weeping" or "tearful"	part of Dies Irae
Lahuta e Malcís		Gheg Albanian	The Highland Lute	Albanian national epic poem
Le bœuf sur le toit		French	The Ox on the Roof	ballet by Darius Milhaud
Le chasseur maudit		French	The Cursed Huntsman	symphonic poem by César Franck
L'eclisse		Italian	The Eclipse	film by Michelangelo Antonioni
L'enfant et les sortilèges		French	The Child and the Spells	opera by Maurice Ravel
Le Grand Meaulnes		French	The Great Meaulnes	novel by Alain-Fournier
Les noces		French	The Wedding	dance cantata by Igor Stravinsky
Le tombeau de Couperin		French	Couperin's Tomb	suite by Maurice Ravel
L'étranger		French	The Outsider	novel by Albert Camus
L'heure espagnole		French	The Spanish Hour/The Time in Spain	opera by Maurice Ravel
Liebestod		German	Love's Death	final scene from the opera Tristan und Isolde by Richard Wagner
Longmen Shiku	龙门石窟/龍門石窟	Chinese	Dragon's Gate Grottoes/Caves	artificial, Buddhist grottoes, located south of Luoyang
L'Isle joyeuse		French	The Joyful Isle	piano piece by Claude Debussy
Má vlast		Czech	My Fatherland	cycle of symphonic poems by Bedřich Smetana
Machu Picchu		Quechua	Old Peaks	Inca site, located above Urubamba Valley, Peru
Madadayo	まあだだよ	Japanese	Not Yet	film by Akira Kurosawa
Mahabharata	महाभारत	Sanskrit	The Great History/Story of the Bharatas	epic of ancient India
Mahabodhi Temple	महाबोधि मंदिर	Sanskrit	Great Awakening Temple	Buddhist temple in Bodh Gaya, India
Masjid Al-Haram	المسجد الحرام	Arabic	The Sacred Mosque	largest mosque in the world, located in Mecca, Saudi Arabia
Mein Kampf		German	My Struggle	autobiography and political treatise by Adolf Hitler
Memento		Latin	Recall	film by Christopher Nolan
Mo Ghile Mear		Irish	My Gallant Darling	song by Seán Clárach Mac Domhnaill
Moai		Rapa Nui	Figurine	monolithic human figures on the Polynesian island of Easter Island
Namárië		Quenya	Be Well	poem by J. R. R. Tolkien
Narn i Chîn Húrin		Sindarin	The Tale of the Children of Húrin	unfinished story by J.R.R. Tolkien
Nayakan	நாயகன்	Tamil	The Hero	film by Mani Ratnam
Nessun dorma		Italian	No-one Shall Sleep	aria from Giacomo Puccini's opera Turandot
Ni no Kuni	二ノ国	Japanese	Second Country	video game by Level-5 and Studio Ghibli
Nibelungenlied		German	Lay/Song of the Nibelungs	German national epic
Nobilissima Visione		Italian	The Noblest Vision	ballet by Paul Hindemith
Notre Dame		French	Our Lady	cathedral in Paris, France
Obaltan	오발탄	Korean	Maybe a Miss	film by Yu Hyun-mok
Ōkami	大神, 狼 or 大紙	Japanese	"Great God" if written as 大神, "Wolf" if written as 狼 or "Great Paper" if written as 大紙	video game published by Capcom
Ōkamiden	大神伝, 狼伝 or 大紙伝	Japanese	"Chronicles of a/the Great God" if written as 大神伝, "Chronicles of a/the Wolf" if written as 狼伝 or "Chronicles of a/the Great Paper" if written as 大紙伝	sequel to Ōkami
Ombra mai fu		Italian	Never was a shade	aria by Georg Friedrich Händel
Orgelbüchlein		German	Little Organ Book	collection of chorale preludes and pedagogical treatise on composition by Johann Sebastian Bach
Pappa Ante Portas		German (the first word) and Latin	Daddy in front of the Gates	film by Loriot
Pavane pour une infante défunte		French	Pavane for a Dead Infanta	piano/orchestral piece by Maurice Ravel
Petite Fleur		French	Little Flower	instrumental by Sidney Bechet
Petra	πέτρα	Greek	Stone	city in the Jordanian governorate of Ma'an, famous for its rock cut architecture
Philosophiæ Naturalis Principia Mathematica		Latin	Mathematical Principles of Natural Philosophy	three books by Sir Isaac Newton
Pierrot lunaire		French	Moonlit [or Moonstruck] Pierrot	song cycle by Arnold Schoenberg
Popol Vuh		Classical K'iche'	Book of the People	corpus of mytho-historical narratives of the K'iche' kingdom in Guatemala
Porco Rosso		Italian	Red Pig	film by Hayao Miyazaki
Potiche		French	Trophy Wife	film by François Ozon
Praan	প্রাণ	Bengali	Stream of Life	poem by Rabindranath Tagore
Prélude à l'après-midi d'un faune		French	Prelude to the Afternoon of a Faun	symphonic poem by Claude Debussy
Princess Mononoke	もののけ姫 (Mononoke-hime)	Japanese	Princess of the demons/monsters (only the hime was translated to English)	film by Hayao Miyazaki
Qur'an (or Koran)	القرآن	Arabic	The Recitation	religious text of Islam by Muhammad
Raag Darbari	रागदरबारी	Hindi	A raga of bureaucracy	Novel by Shrilal Shukla
Ramakien	รามเกียรติ์	Thai	Glory of Rama	Thailand's national epic
Ramayana	रामायण	Sanskrit	Rama's Path	ancient Indian epic
Ran	乱	Japanese	"Chaos" or "Revolt"	film by Akira Kurosawa
Rashōmon	羅城門	Japanese	Gate of the Fortress	former Japanese monuments, were located in Heijō-kyō and Heian-kyō, Japan
Rashomon	羅生門	Japanese	Gate of the Fortress	film by Akira Kurosawa
Ratatouille		French	a French dish	film by Pixar
Selva morale e spirituale		Italian	Moral and Spiritual Forest	collection of sacred music by Claudio Monteverdi
Serse		Italian	Xerxes	opera by Georg Friedrich Händel
Shahnameh	شاهنامه	Persian	The Book of Kings	enormous poetic opus written by the Persian poet Ferdowsi
Shiri/Swiri	쉬리	Korean	Korean Splendid Dace	film by Kang Je-gyu
Shoah	השואה	Hebrew	Calamity	film by Claude Lanzmann
Silmarillion		Quenya	From the Radiance of Pure Light	collection of J. R. R. Tolkien's mythopoeic works
Skáldskaparmál		Old Norse	Language of Poetry	poem by Snorri Sturluson, consisting of around 50,000 words
Skeireins	𐍃𐌺𐌴𐌹𐍂𐌴𐌹𐌽𐍃	Gothic	Explanation	commentary on the Gospel of John by an unknown Gothic author
Stalag 17		German	a German abbreviation for "Stammlager" (base/main camp)	film by Billy Wilder
Suzakumon	朱雀門	Japanese	Gate of the Vermilion Bird	former Japanese monuments, were located in Fujiwara-kyō, Heijō-kyō and Heian-kyō, Japan
Taegukgi	태극기	Korean	South Korean Flag	film by Kang Je-gyu
Taj Mahal	تاج محل or ताज महल	Persian	Crown of Buildings	Indian monument, located in Agra, India
Te Deum		Latin	You, God	Christian hymn of praise
Tekken	鉄拳	Japanese	Iron Fist	video game series by Namco
Tiananmen	天安门/天安門	Chinese	Gate of Heavenly Peace	Chinese Monument, located in Beijing, People's Republic of China
Titash Ekti Nadir Naam	তিতাস একটি নদীর নাম	Bengali	A River Named Titash	film by Ritwik Ghatak
Todesfuge		German	Death Fugue	poem by Paul Celan
Torah	תּוֹרָה	Hebrew	Instruction	Judaism's founding legal and ethical religious texts, probably by Moses
Tristan und Isolde		German	Tristan and Iseult	opera by Richard Wagner
(Tsubaki) Sanjūrō	椿三十郎 or 三十郎	Japanese	Thirty-year-old Camellia Tree or Thirty-year-old	film by Akira Kurosawa
Turandot	توراندختر	Persian	Turan's Daughter	opera by Giacomo Puccini
Vers la flamme		French	Towards the Flame	piano piece by Alexander Scriabin
Verklärte Nacht		German	Transfigured Night	string sextet by Arnold Schoenberg
Vespro della Beata Vergine		Italian	Vespers for the Blessed Virgin, 1610	musical composition by Claudio Monteverdi
Volver		Spanish	To Return	film by Pedro Almodóvar
Vom Kriege		German	On War	book by Carl von Clausewitz
Weiß Kreuz		German	White Cross (accurately "weißes Kreuz" in German)	anime by Ken'ichi Kanemaki
Winterreise		German	Winter Journey	song cycle by Franz Schubert
Yeelen		Bambara	Brightness	film by Souleymane Cissé
Yojimbo	用心棒	Japanese	Bodyguard	film by Akira Kurosawa
Yungang Shiku	云冈石窟/雲岡石窟	Chinese	Cloud Ridge Grottoes/Caves	artificial, buddhist grottoes, located by Datong
Zaveshchanie russkogo fashista	Завещание русского фашиста	Russian	The Last Will of a Russian fascist	book by Konstantin Rodzaevsky
Zemlya	Земля	Ukrainian	Soil/Earth	film by Alexander Dovzhenko
