= Brian Houghton Hodgson =

British diplomat and naturalist (1800–1894)

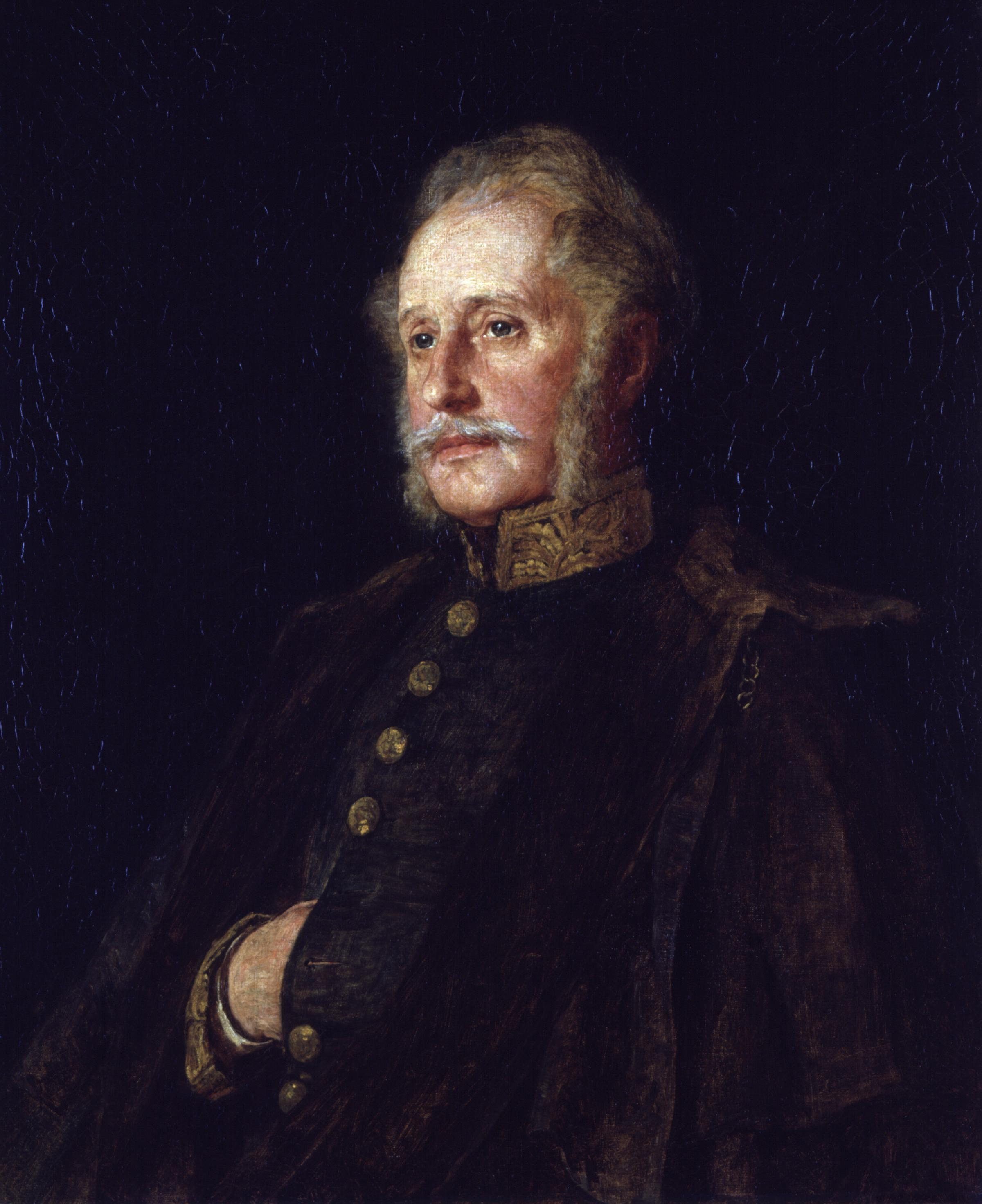
- Portrait by Louisa Starr, c. 1872
- Born: 1 February 1801; Prestbury, Cheshire, England
- Died: 23 May 1894 (aged 93); London, England
- Education: East India Company College
- Employer: British East India Company
- Notable work: Classified catalogue of mammals of Nepal, Illustrations of the Literature and Religion of the Buddhists.
- Spouse(s): Anne Scott, Susan Townshend.
- Scientific career
- Author abbrev. (zoology): Hodgson

Brian Houghton Hodgson (1 February 1801 – 23 May 1894) was a British diplomat, naturalist and ethnologist who spent most of his life in India and Nepal, serving as a British resident in the latter. He described numerous species of birds and mammals from the Himalayas, and several birds were named after him by others such as Edward Blyth. He was a scholar of Newar Buddhism and wrote extensively on a range of topics relating to linguistics and religion. He was an opponent of the British proposal to introduce English as the official medium of instruction in Indian schools.

== Early life ==
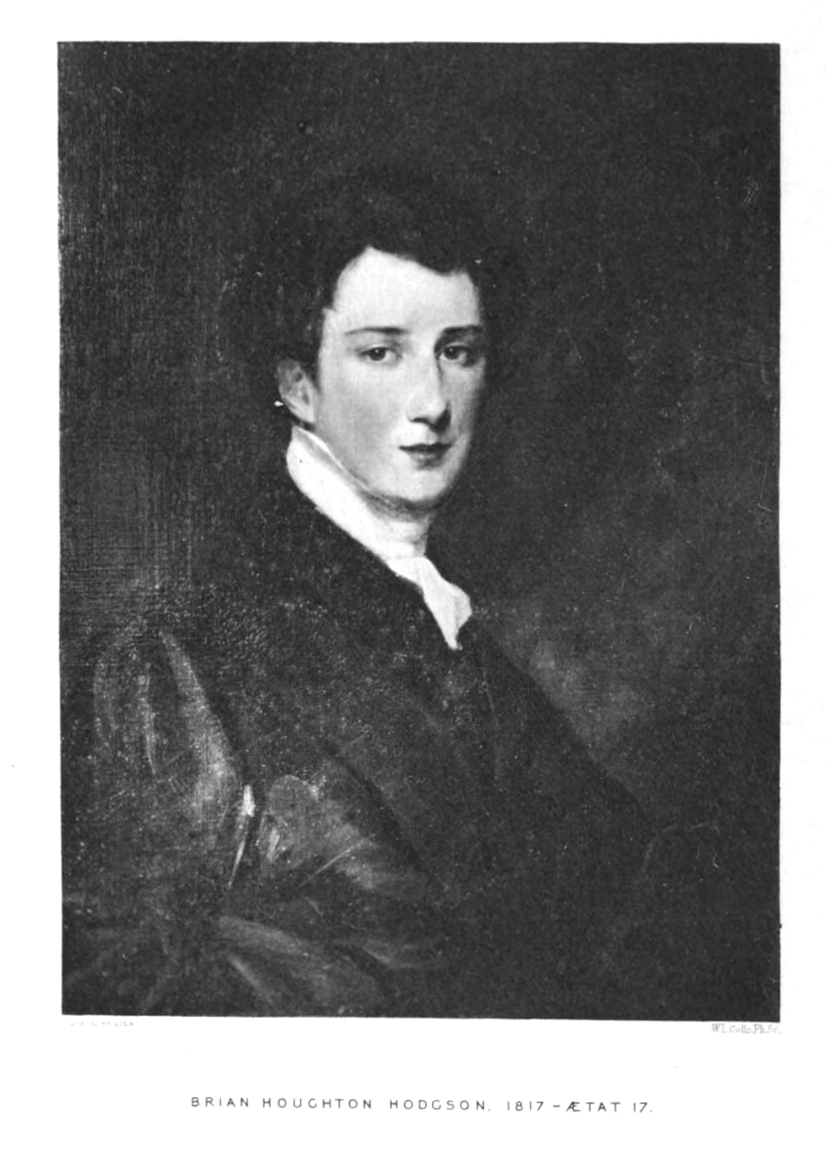
Aged 17

Hodgson was the second of seven children of Brian Hodgson (1766–1858) and his wife Catherine (1776–1851), and was born at Lower Beech, Prestbury, Cheshire. His father lost money in a bad bank investment and had to sell their home at Lower Beech. A great-aunt married to Beilby Porteus, the Bishop of London, helped them but the financial difficulties were great. Hodgson's father worked as a warden of the Martello towers and in 1820 was barrack-master at Canterbury. Brian (the son) studied at Macclesfield Grammar School until 1814 and the next two years at Richmond, Surrey under the tutelage of Daniel Delafosse. He was nominated for the Bengal civil service by the East India Company director James Pattison. He went to study at the East India Company College and showed an aptitude for languages. An early influence was Thomas Malthus who was a family friend and a staff member at the college. At the end of his first term in May 1816, he obtained a prize for Bengali. He graduated in December 1817 as a gold medallist.

== India ==
At the age of seventeen (1818) he travelled to India as a writer in the British East India Company. His talent for languages such as Sanskrit and especially Persian was to prove useful for his career. He was posted as Assistant Commissioner in the Kumaon region during 1819–20 reporting to George William Traill. The Kumaon region had been annexed from Nepal and in 1820 he was made assistant to the resident in Nepal, but he took up a position of acting deputy secretary in the Persian department of the Foreign office in Calcutta. Ill health made him prefer to go back into the hills of Nepal. He took up position in 1824 as postmaster and later assistant resident in 1825. In January 1833 he became the British Resident at Kathmandu. He continued to suffer from ill health and gave up meat and alcohol in 1837. He studied the Nepalese people, producing a number of papers on their languages, literature and religion. In 1853 he made a brief visit to England and the Netherlands. He married Anne Scott in the British Embassy at the Hague. She died in 1868. In 1870 he married Susan Townshend of Derry. In 1838 he was made Chevalier of the Légion d'honneur by the French government.

== Nepal politics ==
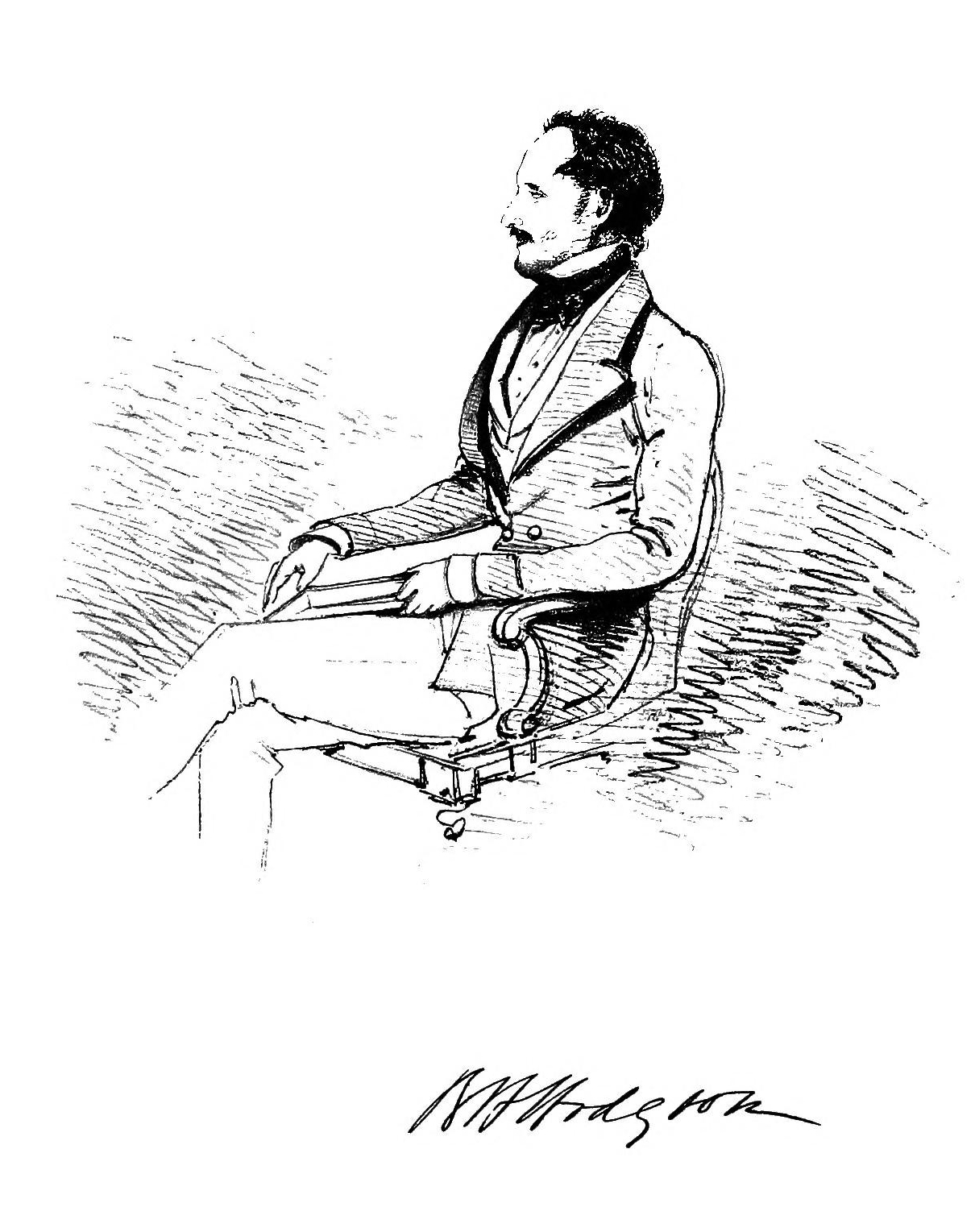
Drawing of Hodgson by William Tayler c. 1849

Hodgson sensed the resentment of Nepal following annexation of a large part of her lands and believed that the situation could be improved by encouraging commerce with Tibet and by making use of the local manpower in the British military. He initially followed his predecessor in co-operating with Bhimsen Thapa, a minister, but later shifted allegiance to the young King Rajendra and sought to interact directly with the King. Hodgson later supported Bhimsen's opponents Rana Jang Pande and Krishna Ram Mishra. In July 1837 King Rajendra's infant son was found dead. Bhimsen was suspected and Hodgson recommended that he be held in custody and this led to widespread anti-British sentiment which was used by the King as well as Rana Jang Pande. Hodgson then became sympathetic to the Brahmin family of the Poudyals who were rivals of the Mishras. In 1839, Bhimsen Thapa committed suicide while still in custody. The nobility felt threatened by Rana Jang Pande and there was considerable instability with an army mutiny that threatened even the British Residency. Lord Auckland, the Governor-General of India, wanted to settle the issue but troops had already been mobilised to Afghanistan and Hodgson had to negotiate through diplomacy. Hodgson was then able to set up Krishna Ram and Ranga Nath Poudyal as ministers to the Nepal king. In 1842, Hodgson provided refuge to an Indian merchant Kashinath from Benares who was sought by King Rajendra for recovery of some dues. When the King went to seize Kashinath, Hodgson put a hand around him and declared that the King would have to take both of them prisoner and this led to a clash. Hodgson chose not to inform the new governor-general, Lord Ellenborough, about the incident. Ellenborough's letter to Hodgson declared that no Resident would act contrary to the views of Government or extend privileges of British subjects beyond limits assigned to them. Ellenborough sought his removal from Kathmandu.

== Return to England ==
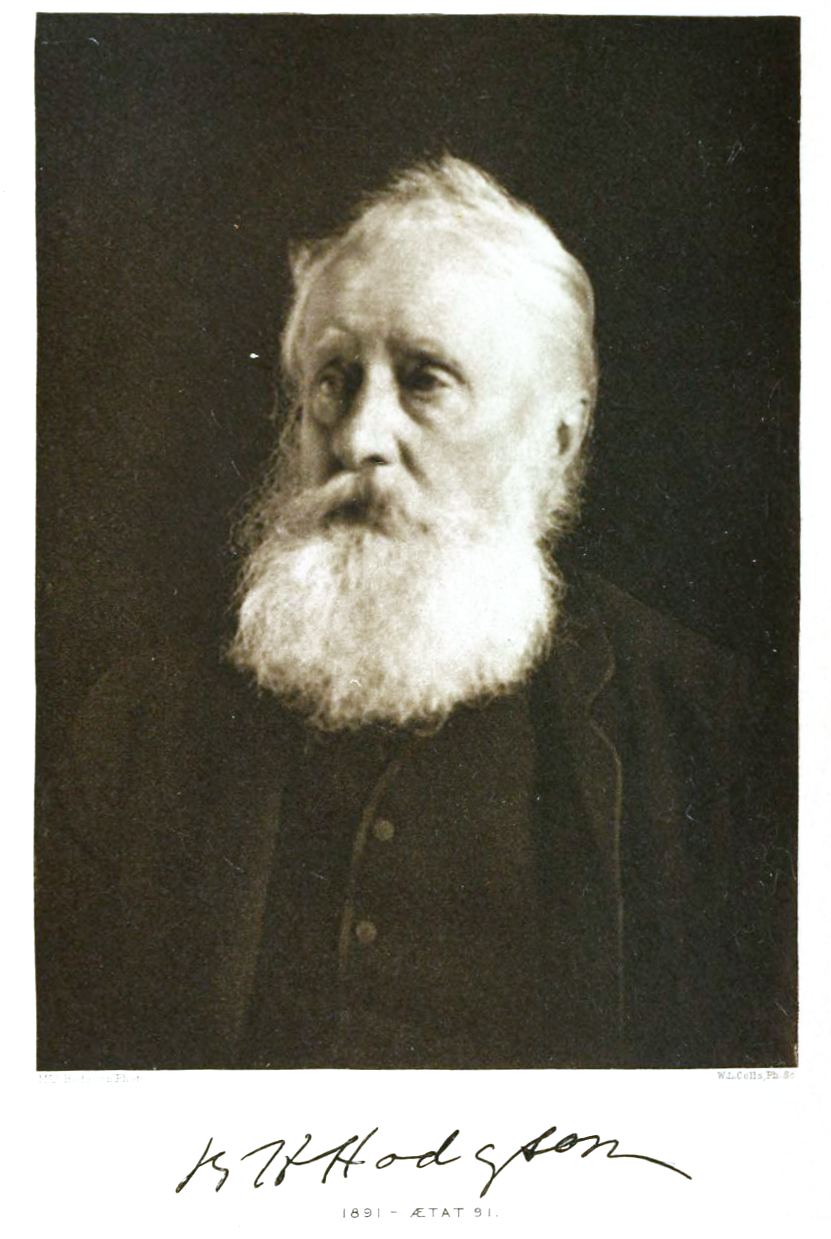
At 91

Hodgson resigned in 1844 when Lord Ellenborough posted Henry Montgomery Lawrence as Resident to Nepal and transferred Hodgson as Assistant Sub-commissioner to Simla. He then returned to England for a short period. During this time, Lord Ellenborough was himself dismissed. Hodgson visited his sister Fanny who had become Baroness Nahuys and was living in Holland. In 1845 he settled in Darjeeling and continued his studies of the peoples of northern India for thirteen years. Joseph Dalton Hooker visited him during this period and wrote back to Charles Darwin with information obtained from Hodgson on the introduced species and hybrids. Hodgson's son Henry was sent to tutor the son-in-law of Jung Bahadur Rana of Nepal. In 1857 he influenced Viscount Canning to accept Jung Bahadur Rana's help in 'suppressing' the Indian Rebellion of 1857. In the summer of 1858, he returned to England and would not visit India again. He lived initially at Dursley in Gloucestershire but in 1867 moved to Alderley in the Cotswolds.

== Ethnology and anthropology ==
During his posting in Nepal, Hodgson became proficient in Nepali and Newari. Hodgson was financially pressed until 1837, but he maintained a group of research assistants at his expense. He collected Buddhist texts in Sanskrit and Pali and studied them with his friend Pandit Amritananda. He believed that there were four schools of Buddhism and wrongly assumed that the Sanskrit texts were older than those in Pali. He however became an expert on Hinayana philosophy. Hodgson had a keen interest in the culture of the people of the Himalayan regions. He believed that racial affinities could be identified on the basis of linguistics and he was influenced by the works of William Jones, Friedrich Schlegel, Johann Blumenbach and Jame Prichard. From his studies he believed that the 'Aboriginal' populations of the Himalayas were not 'Aryans' or 'Caucasians', but the 'Tamulian', who he claimed were unique to India. Hodgson obtained copies of ancient Buddhist texts, the Kahgyur and the Stangyur. One copy was gifted to him by the Grand Lama. These were rare Tibetan works based on old Sanskrit writings (brought originally from the area of the Buddha's personal teachings in Magadha or Bihar in India) and he was able to offer them to the Asiatic Society and the Royal Asiatic Society of Great Britain and Ireland in 1838. The Russian government purchased part of the same book for £2000 around the same time.

In 1837 Hodgson collected the first Sanskrit text of the Lotus Sutra and sent it to translator Eugène Burnouf of the Collége de France, Paris.

== Educational reform ==
During his service in India, Hodgson was a strong proponent of education in the local languages and opposed both the use of English as a medium of instruction as advocated by Lord Macaulay as well as the orientalist view that supported the use of Arabic, Persian or Sanskrit. From 1835 to 1839, Hodgson, William Adam, Frederick Shore and William Campbell wrote against Macaulay's idea of education in the English medium. Hodgson wrote a series of essays for the journal of the Serampore Mission The Friend of India that argued for the education in the vernacular. The essays were republished in 1880 in his Miscellaneous Essays Relating to Indian Subjects.

No one has more earnestly urged the duty of communicating European knowledge to the natives than Mr. Hodgson; no one has more powerfully shown the importance of employing the vernacular languages for accomplishing that object; no one has more eloquently illustrated the necessity of conciliating the learned and of making them our coadjutors in the great work of a nation's regeneration.

— William Adam, 1838

== Ornithology and natural history ==
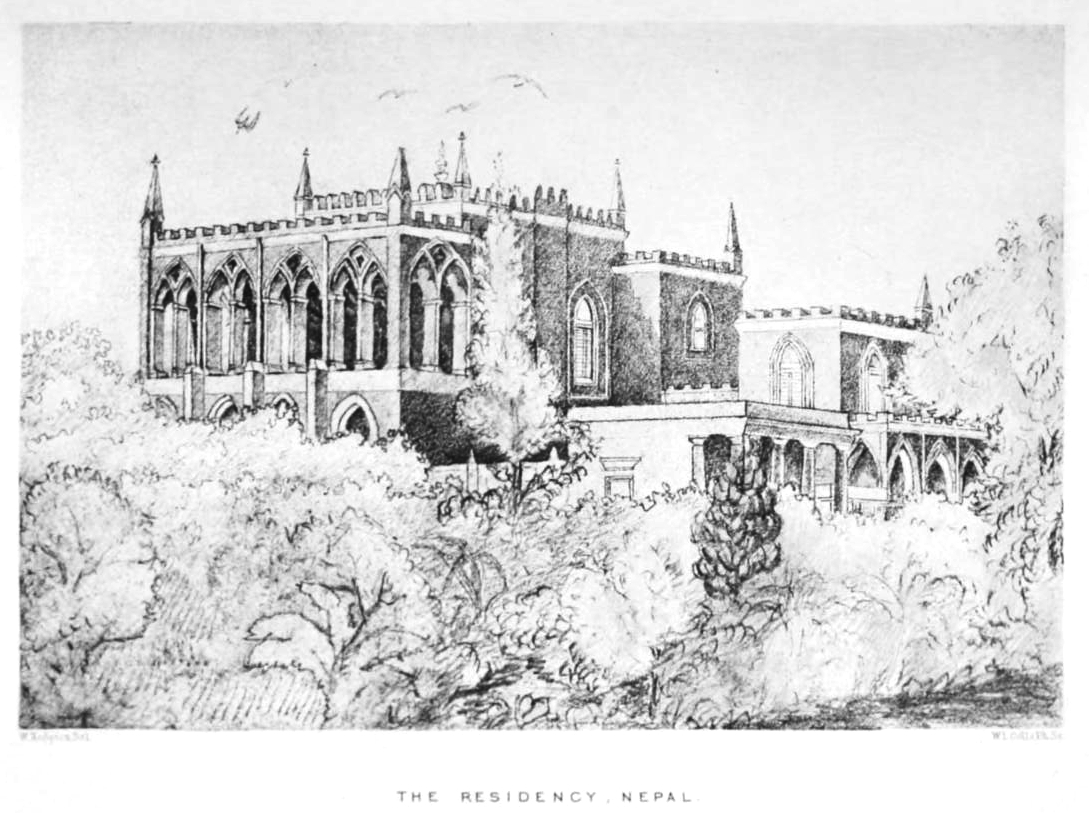
The Residency, Hodgson's home in Nepal

Hodgson studied all aspects of natural history around him including material from Nepal, Sikkim and Bengal. He amassed a large collection of birds and mammal skins which he later donated to the British Museum. As a result of an order by the Nepalese court he was unable to travel outside Kathmandu while living there and he therefore employed local hunters to collect his specimens for him. He described a species of antelope which was named after him, the Tibetan Antelope Pantholops hodgsonii. He also described the pygmy hog which he gave the scientific name of Porcula salvania, the species name derived from the Sal forest ("van" in Sanskrit) habitat where it was found. He also discovered 39 species of mammals and 124 species of birds which had not been described previously, 79 of the bird species were described by himself. The zoological collections presented to the British Museum by Hodgson in 1843 and 1858 contained 10,499 specimens. In addition to these, the collection also included an enormous number of drawings and coloured sketches of Indian animals by three native artists under his supervision. These sketches include anatomical details and Hodgson may have learned dissection and anatomy from Archibald Campbell. One of them was Raj Man Singh, but many of the paintings are unsigned. Most of them were subsequently transferred to the Zoological Society of London and the Natural History Museum.

His studies were recognised and the Royal Asiatic Society made him a member in 1828 and the Linnean Society of London elected him as a fellow in 1835. He was elected a Fellow of the Royal Society in June 1877. The Zoological Society of London sent him their diploma as a corresponding member. The Société Asiatique de Paris and the Museum d'Histoire Naturelle also honoured him. Around 1837 he planned an illustrated work on the birds and mammals of Nepal. The Museum d'Histoire Naturelle de Paris and other learned bodies came forward as supporters, three hundred and thirty subscribers registered in India, and in July 1837 he was able to write to his father that the means of publication were secured: "I make sure of three hundred and fifty to four hundred subscribers, and if we say 10 per copy of the work, this list should cover all expenses. Granted my first drawings were stiff and bad, but the new series may challenge comparison with any in existence." He hoped to finish the work in 1840.

In 1845, he presented 259 bird skins to the Natural History Society of Northumberland, Durham, and Newcastle upon Tyne.

After retiring to Darjeeling he took a renewed interest in natural history. During the spring of 1848 he was visited by Sir Joseph Hooker. He wrote to his sister Fanny:

I have still my accomplished and amiable guest, Dr. Hooker, with me, and am even thinking of accompanying him on an excursion to the foot of the snows. Our glorious peak Kinchinjinga proves to be the loftiest in the range and consequently in the world, being 28,178 feet above the sea. Dr. Hooker and I wish to make the nearer acquaintance of this king of mountains, and we propose, if we can, to slip over one of the passes into Tibet in order to measure the height of that no less unique plateau, and also to examine the distribution of plants and animals in these remarkable mountains which ascend from nearly the sea-level, by still increasing heights and corresponding changes of climate, to the unparalleled elevation above spoken of. Dr. Hooker is young in years but old in knowledge, has been at the Antarctic Pole with Ross, and is the friend and correspondent of the veteran Humboldt. He says our Darjiling botany is a wondrous mixture of tropical and northern forms, even more so than in Nepal and the western parts of the Himalayan ranges; for we have several palms and tree-ferns and Cycases and Musas (wild plantain), whereas to the westward there are few or none of these. Cryptogamous plants abound yet more here than there, especially fungi. Every old tree is loaded with them and with masses of lichens, and is twined round by climbing plants as big as itself, whilst Orchideae or air plants put forth their luscious blossoms from every part of it. Dr. Hooker has procured ten new species of rhododendrons, one of which is an epiphyte, and five palms and three Musas and three tree-ferns and two Cycases. These are closely juxtaposed to oaks, chestnuts, birches, alders, magnolias, Michelias, Oleas, all of enormous size. To them I must add rhododendrons, including the glorious epidendric species above spoken of, and whose large white blossoms depend from the highest branches of the highest oaks and chestnuts. Laurels too abound with me as forest trees, and a little to the north are the whole coniferous family, Pinus, Picea, Abies, with larch and cedar and cypress and juniper, all represented by several species and nearly all first-rate for size and beauty. Then my shrubs are Camelias and Daphnes and Polygonums and dwarf bamboos; and my herbaceous things, or flowers and grasses, bluebells, geraniums, Cynoglossum, Myriactis, Gnaphalium, with nettles, docks, chickweeds, and such household weeds. I wish, Fan, you were here to botanise with Dr. Hooker; for I am unworthy, having never heeded this branch of science, and he is such a cheerful, well-bred youthful philosopher that you would derive as much pleasure as profit from intercourse with him. Go and see his father Sir William Hooker at the Royal Gardens at Kew.

He wrote in 1849 on the physical geography of the Himalayan region, looking at the patterns of river-flows, the distributions and affinities of various species of mammals, birds and plants while also looking at the origins of the people inhabiting different regions.

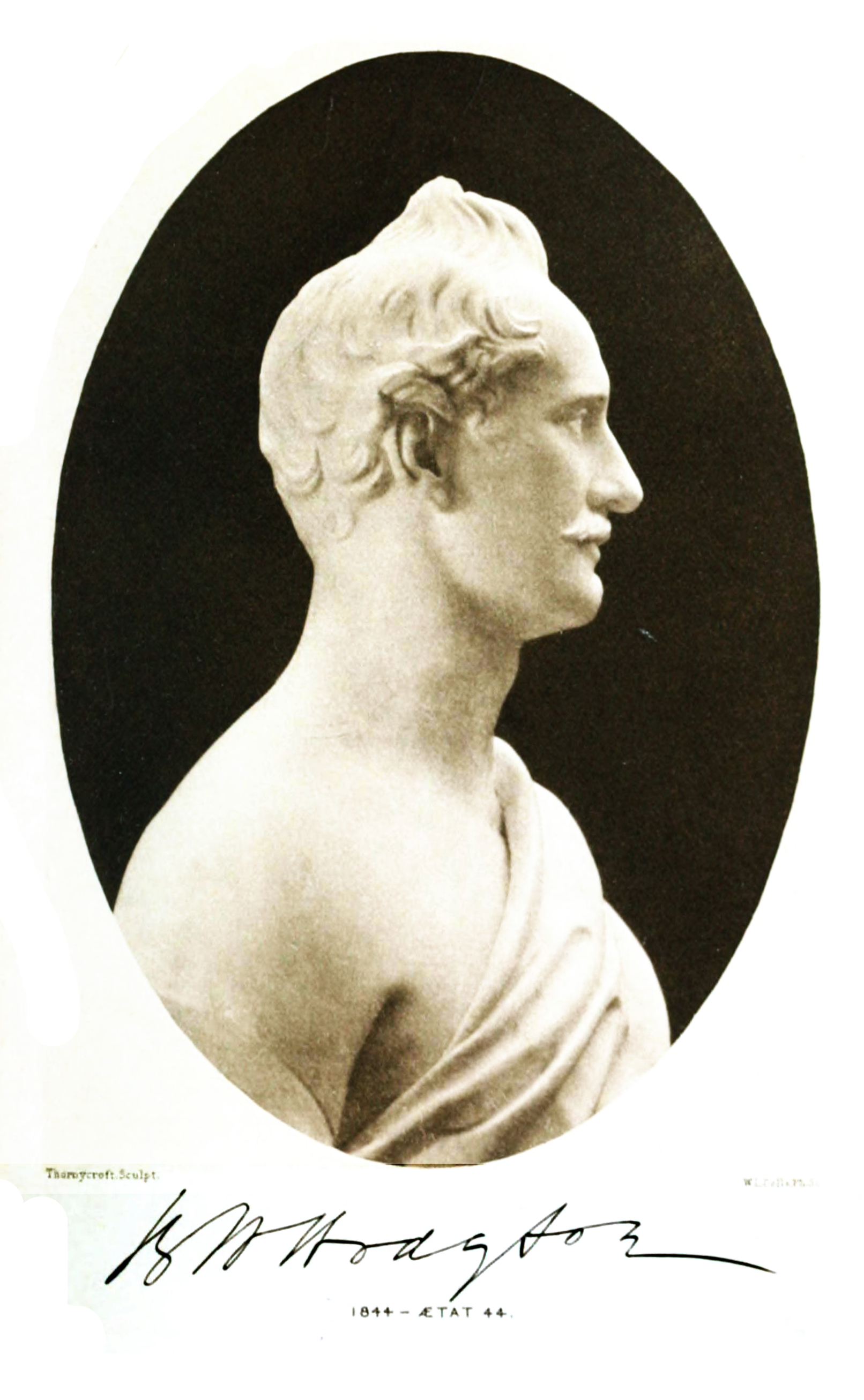
Bust of Hodgson at the Asiatic Society Museum in Calcutta by Thomas Thornycroft

Allan Octavian Hume said of him:

Mr. Hodgson's mind was many-sided, and his work extended into many fields of which I have little knowledge. Indeed of all the many subjects which, at various times, engaged his attention, there is only one with which I am well acquainted and in regard to his researches in which I am at all competent to speak. I refer of course to Indian Ornithology, and extensive as were his labours in this field, they absorbed, I believe, only a minor portion of his intellectual activities. Moreover his opportunities in this direction were somewhat circumscribed, for Nepal and Sikkim were the only provinces in our vast empire whose birds he was able to study in life for any considerable period. Yet from these two comparatively small provinces he added fully a hundred and fifty good new species to the Avifauna of the British Asian Empire, and few and far between have been the new species subsequently discovered within the limits he explored. But this detection and description of previously unknown species was only the smaller portion of his contributions to Indian Ornithology. He trained Indian artists to paint birds with extreme accuracy from a scientific point of view, and under his careful supervision admirable large-scale pictures were produced, not only of all the new species above referred to, but also of several hundred other already recorded ones, and in many cases of their nests and eggs also. These were continually accompanied by exact, life-size, pencil drawings of the bills, nasal orifices, legs, feet, and claws (the scutellation of the tarsi and toes being reproduced with photographic accuracy and minuteness), and of the arrangement of the feathers in crests, wings, and tails. Then on the backs of the plates was preserved an elaborate record of the colours of the irides, bare facial skin, wattles, legs, and feet, as well as detailed measurements, all taken from fresh and numerous specimens, of males, females, and young of each species, and over and above all this, invaluable notes as to food (ascertained by dissection), nidification and eggs, station, habits, constituting as a whole materials for a life-history of many hundred species such as I believe no one ornithologist had ever previously garnered. ...
Hodgson combined much of Blyth's talent for classification with much of Jerdon's habit of persevering personal observation, and excelled the latter in literary gifts and minute and exact research. But with Hodgson ornithology was only a pastime or at best a parergon, and humble a branch of science as is ornithology, it is yet like all other branches a jealous mistress demanding an undivided allegiance; and hence with, I think, on the whole, higher qualifications, he exercised practically somewhat less influence on ornithological evolution than either of his great contemporaries. ...

Many birds of the Himalayan region were first formally described and given a binomial name by Hodgson. The list of world birds maintained by Frank Gill, Pamela Rasmussen and David Donsker on behalf of the International Ornithological Committee credits Hodgson as the authority for 29 genera and 77 species.

Charles Darwin in his Variation of Animals and Plants under Domestication, when discussing the origin of the domestic dog, mentions that Hodgson succeeded in taming the young of the race primaevus of the dhole or Indian wild dog (Cuon alpinus), and in making them as fond of him and as intelligent as ordinary dogs. Darwin also cited a 1847 article by Hodgson on the varieties of sheep and goats in the Himalayas.

== Personal life and death ==
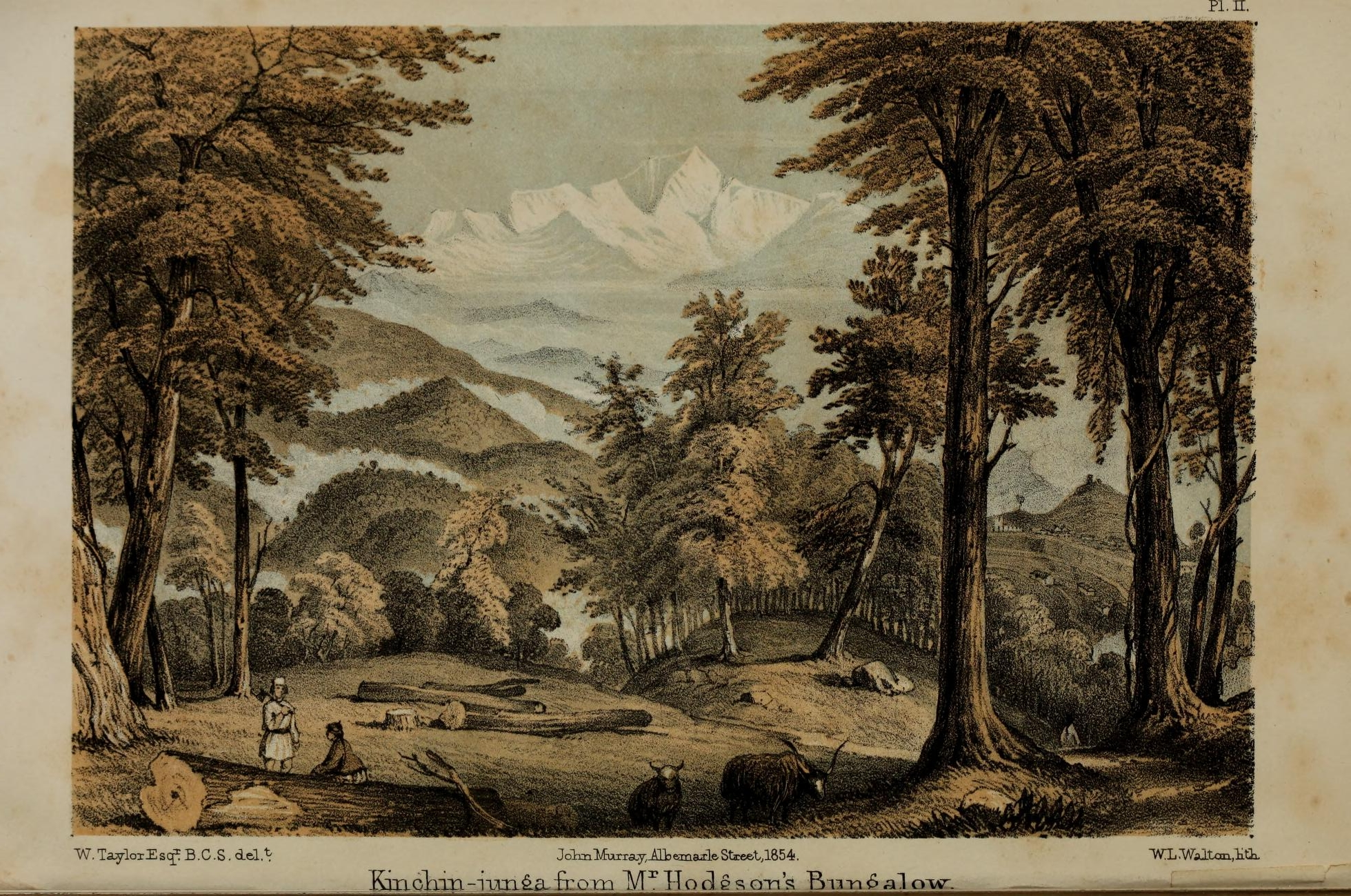
View from Hodgson's home in Darjeeling as seen by J.D. Hooker in 1854

In 1839 he wrote to his sister Fanny that he did not eat meat or drink wine and preferred Indian food habits after his ill health in 1837. Due to his strict vegetarian diet he required the nickname "Hermit of the Himalayas".

During his life in India, Hodgson fathered two children (Henry, who died in Darjeeling in 1856, and Sarah, who died in Holland in 1851; a third child possibly died young) with a Muslim woman, Mehr-un-Nissa, who lived with him from 1830 until her death around 1843. Worried about the abuse and discrimination in India of 'mixed-race' children, he had his children sent to Holland to live with his sister Fanny, but both died young. He married Anne Scott in 1853 who lived in Darjeeling until her death in January 1868. He moved to England in 1858 and lived at Dursley, Gloucestershire, and then at Alderley (1867, where his neighbours included Marianne North). In 1869 he married Susan, daughter of Rev. Chambré Townshend of Derry, who outlived him. He had no children from his marriages. He died at his home on Dover Street in London on 23 May 1894 and was buried at Alderley churchyard in Gloucestershire.

Hodgson refers to the ornithologist Samuel Tickell as his brother-in-law. Tickell's sister Mary Rosa was married to Brian's brother William Edward John Hodgson (1805 – 12 June 1838). Mary returned to England after the death of William Hodgson and married Lumisden Strange in February 1840.

== Honours ==
Hodgson was awarded the DCL, honoris causa by Oxford University in 1889. His friend Joseph Hooker named the genus Hodgsonia (Cucurbitaceae), Magnolia hodgsonii, and a species of rhododendron, Rhododendron hodgsoni, after him. Several species of bird including Hodgson's hawk-eagle, Hodgson's hawk-cuckoo, Hodgson's bushchat, Hodgson's redstart, Hodgson's frogmouth and Hodgson's treecreeper are named after him. Other animals named after him include the Hodgson's bat, Hodgson's giant flying squirrel, Hodgson's brown-toothed shrew and Hodgson's rat snake.

He is commemorated in the scientific name of the snake species Elaphe hodgsoni (synonyms: Gonyosoma hodgsoni, Orthriophis hodgsoni) and the plant genus Hodgsonia Hook.f. & Thomson (1854) (Cucurbitaceae).

== Selected publications ==
- Hodgson, B. H. (1836). "Synoptical description of sundry new animals, enumerated in the Catalogue of Nepalese Mammals". Journal of the Asiatic Society of Bengal. 5: 231–238.
- Hodgson, B. H. (1838). "Classified catalogue of Nepalese mammalia". Annals of Natural History. 1 (2): 152−154.
- Hodgson, B. H. (1841). "Classified catalogue of mammals of Nepal". Calcutta Journal of Natural History and Miscellany of the Arts and Sciences in India. 4: 284−294.
- Hodgson, B. H. (1841). Illustrations of the Literature and Religion of the Buddhists. Serampore: self-published.
- Hodgson, B. H. (1842). "Notice of the mammals of Tibet, with descriptions and plates of some new species". Journal of the Asiatic Society of Bengal. 11 (1): 275–289.
- Hodgson, B. H. (1846). Catalogue of the Specimens and Drawings of Mammalia and Birds of Nepal and Thibet. London: British Museum.
- Hodgson, B.H. (1847a). "On a new form of the Hog kind or Suidae". Journal of the Asiatic Society of Bengal. 16 (1): 423–428.
- Hodgson, B. H. (1847b). "Description of the wild ass (Asinus polydon) and wolf of Tibet (Lupus laniger)". Calcutta Journal of Natural History. 7: 469–477.
- Hodgson, B. H. (1847c). "Observations on the manners and structure of Prionodon pardicolor". Calcutta Journal of Natural History. 8: 40–45.
- Hodgson, B. H. (1847d). Essay the first; On the Kocch, Bódo and Dhimál tribes. Calcutta: J. Thomas, Baptist Mission Press.
- Hodgson, B. H. (1847e). "On the tame sheep and goats of the sub-Himalayas and of Tibet". Journal of the Asiatic Society of Bengal. 16 (2): 1003–1026.
- Hodgson, B. H. (1849). "On the physical geography of the Himalaya". Journal of the Asiatic Society of Bengal. 32: 761–788.
- Hodgson, B. H. (1853). "Felis macrosceloides". Proceedings of the Zoological Society of London. I. Mammalia: Plate XXXVIII.
- Hodgson, B. H. (1874). Essays on the Languages, Literature and Religion of Nepal and Tibet. London: Trübner & Company.
- Hodgson, B. H. (1880a). Miscellaneous Essays Relating to Indian Subjects. Vol. 1. London: Trübner & Company.
- Hodgson, B. H. (1880b). Miscellaneous Essays Relating to Indian Subjects. Vol. 2. London: Trübner & Company.

== Sources ==
- Darwin, Charles (1868). The Variation of Animals and Plants under Domestication. Vol. 1. London: John Murray.
- Hunter, W. W. (1896). Life of Brian Houghton Hodgson. London: John Murray.
