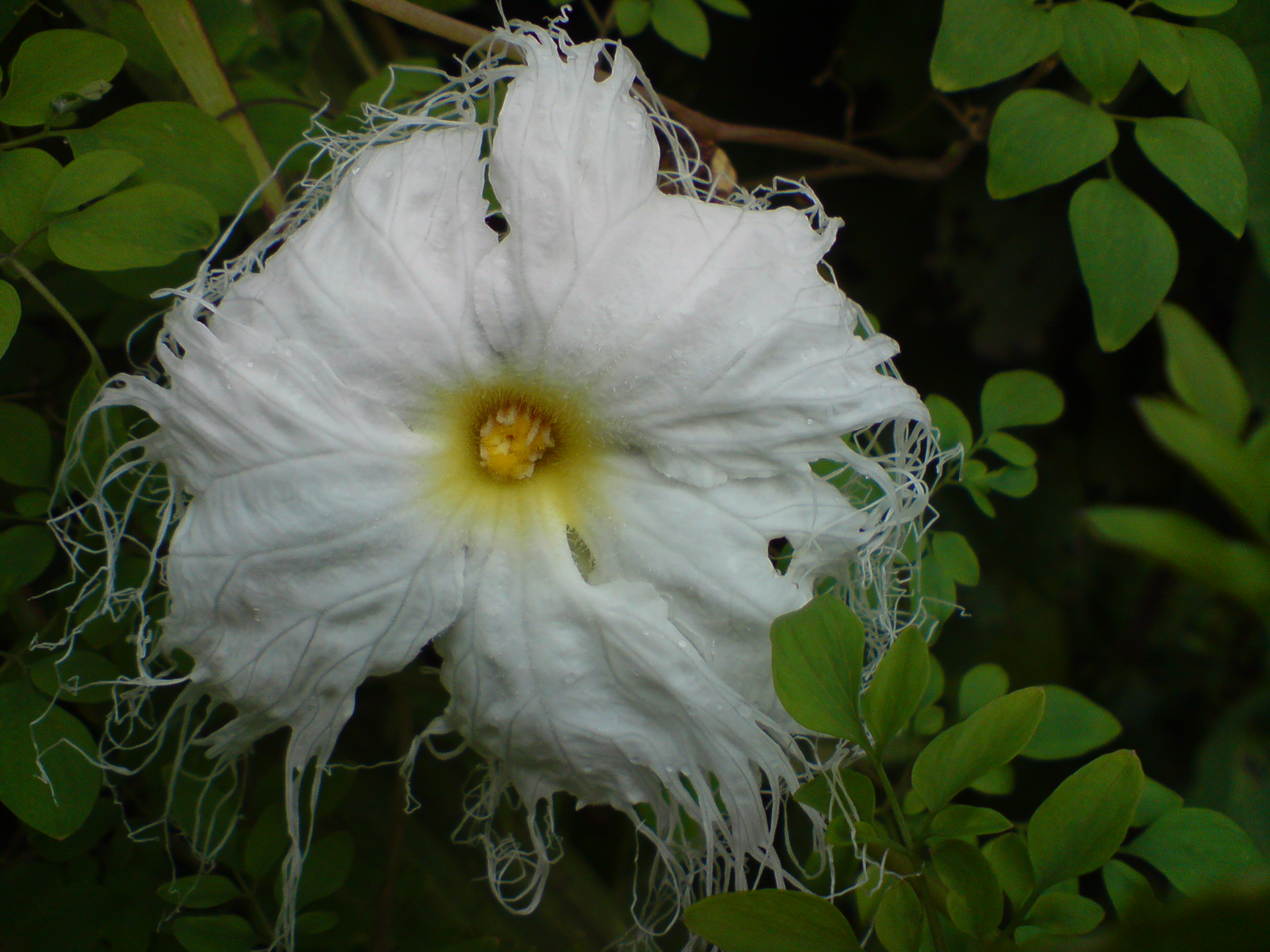
- Male flower of Hodgsonia heteroclita

Scientific classification
- Kingdom: Plantae
- Clade: Tracheophytes
- Clade: Angiosperms
- Clade: Eudicots
- Clade: Rosids
- Order: Cucurbitales
- Family: Cucurbitaceae
- Subfamily: Cucurbitoideae
- Tribe: Sicyoeae
- Genus: Hodgsonia; Hook.f. & Thomson

Species
- Hodgsonia heteroclita; Hodgsonia macrocarpa; Hodgsonia tsai

= Hodgsonia =

Genus of flowering plants

Hodgsonia is a small genus of fruit-bearing vines in the family Cucurbitaceae.

Hodgsonia was named after Brian Houghton Hodgson in 1853 by the British botanists Joseph Dalton Hooker and Thomas Thomson, who examined the plant under Hodgson's hospitality in the Himalaya.

== Classification ==
Three species are accepted by Plants of the World Online:

- Hodgsonia heteroclita (Roxb.) Hook.f. & Thomson 1853
- Hodgsonia macrocarpa (Blume) Cogn. 1881
- Hodgsonia tsai J.Y.Shen, X.D.Ma, W.G.Wang & B.Pan bis 2022

== Physical characteristics ==
Hodgsonia heteroclita is a vine or liana growing up to 30 m (98 ft) in length. The leaves are about 15 cm (5.9 in) long and wide. The flowers bloom for just one night, then fall off. It is dioecious, with separate male and female plants. The five-petaled flowers have numerous filaments up to 7.5 cm (3.0 in) long hanging from the end of each petal. These flowers are white in front and yellow with red stripes on the back. The fruit which follows is the shape and colour of a small pumpkin (Cucurbita pepo).

	H. heteroclita	H. macrocarpa
Leaf lobes	Usually 5	Usually 3

== Uses ==
=== Food ===
Although the flesh of Hodgsonia fruit is inedible and considered worthless, the large, oil-rich seeds are an important source of food. The kernels are occasionally eaten raw; they are slightly bitter, possibly due to an unidentified alkaloid or glucoside, but "perfectly safe" to eat. More commonly, the seeds are roasted, after which they taste like pork scraps or lard; many mountain peoples consider these roasted seeds a delicacy. In addition to eating the seeds alone, the Naga incorporate them into various types of curry. The Karbi Community of North East India cultivate it in their backyard gardens and consume it as a side dish during a meal. They call it Hanthar Athe.

=== Medicine ===
The medicinal importance of Hodgsonia is mostly in its leaves. In Malaya and java, native physicians report several uses for the nose. The leaves may be dried and burnt, and the smoke inhaled, or the juice of young stems and leaves is squeezed into the nostrils to allay irritation from small insects. The leaves are also boiled and the resulting liquid taken internally, both for nose complaints and to reduce fevers. The ashes from burnt leaves of H. macrocarpa are also used to heal wounds.

In Nagaland, the fruit bulb is applied to bacterial infections in the feet. In Sarawak, Hodgsonia oil is used to anoint the bodies of mothers after childbirth; it also forms the base of embrocations carrying ashes from the leaves of coconut palm and Kaempferia. The oil is also used as a base for medicines in Eastern India.

== Vernacular names ==
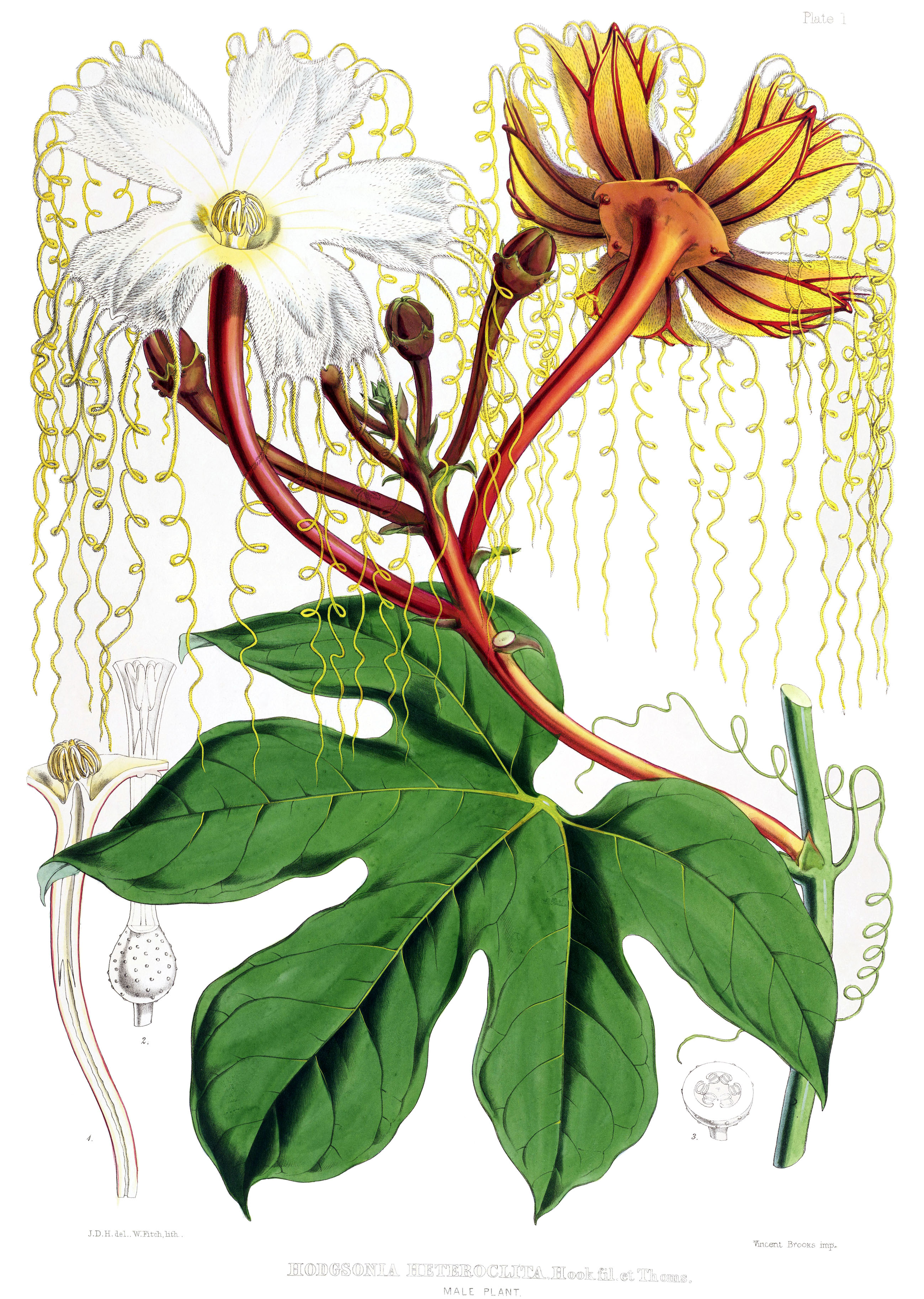
Hodgsonia heteroclita male plant

- In the north, H. heteroclita:
  - India, Sikkim (Lepchas): Kat'hior-pot; Nagaland: Assa; Mizoram: Khaûm
  - China, Yunnan: You-zha-guo (油渣果, "Fat-cracklings fruit")
  - Bangladesh: Makal; Sylhet: Goolur
  - Vietnam: Đài hái, Cây mỡ lợn, Dây beo, Ké bao, Mướp rừng, Dây sén, Mác Kịch (Tày)
  - Laos: Mak klung
- In the south, H. macrocarpa:
  - Thailand, Pattani: Kāpā yê
  - Malaysia, Malaya: Akar kêpayang, Kêlêpayang, Pepayang, Teruah, Breuh
  - Indonesia, Java: Akar kêpayang; (Sundanese): Aroi pichung, Chèlèng; Sumatra: Bilungking, Kadam
- European languages:
  - (English): Kadam seed, Kapayang, Lard fruit; Chinese lardplant
  - (Dutch): Kadamzaad

Some of these names are ambiguous. "Kepayang" might mean Pangium edule, the "football fruit" tree whose aril is edible but whose large seeds are so laden with hydrocyanic acid that they are used as a powerful arrow poison. The seeds can be prepared for human consumption; they are boiled and steeped in water, not roasted. "Kadam" can also mean Anthocephalus cadamba, a tree with much smaller fruit and minute seeds.
