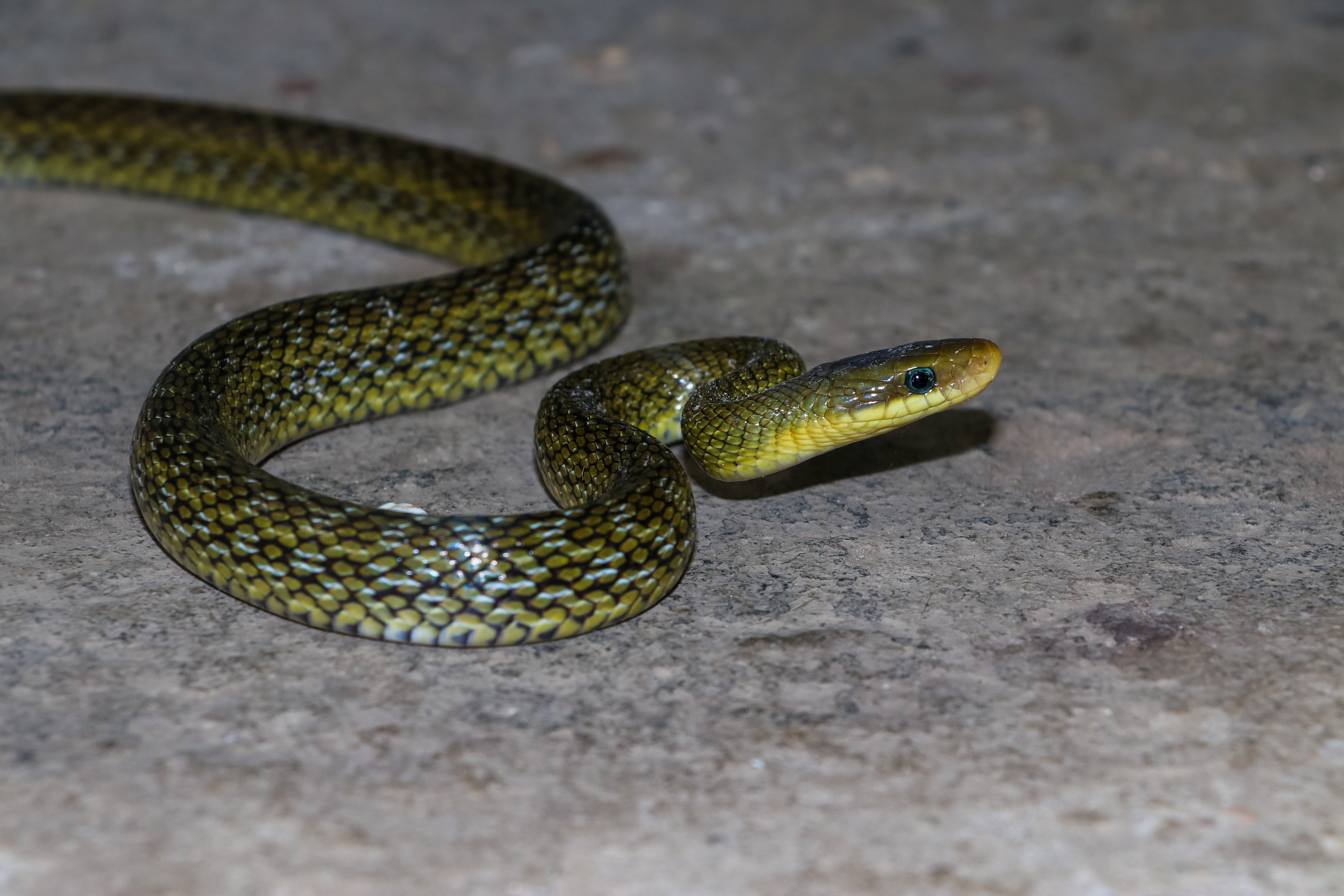

Conservation status
- Least Concern (IUCN 3.1)

Scientific classification
- Kingdom: Animalia
- Phylum: Chordata
- Class: Reptilia
- Order: Squamata
- Suborder: Serpentes
- Family: Colubridae
- Genus: Elaphe
- Species: E. hodgsoni

Binomial name
- Elaphe hodgsoni (Günther, 1860)

Synonyms
- Spilotes hodgsonii Günther, 1860; Compsosoma hodgsonii — Günther, 1864; Coluber hodgsoni — Boulenger, 1890; Elaphe hodgsoni — Smith M.A., 1943; Gonyosoma hodgsoni — Wallach, 1997; Orthriophis hodgsoni — Utiger et al., 2002; Elaphe hodgsoni — Chen et al., 2017

= Elaphe hodgsoni =

Species of snake

Elaphe hodgsoni, also known commonly as Hodgson's rat snake and the Himalayan trinket snake, is a species of snake in the family Colubridae. The species is native to parts of Asia around the Himalayas.

== Etymology ==
The specific name, hodgsoni, is in honor of British naturalist Brian Houghton Hodgson.

== Description ==
E. hodgsoni grows to 4 feet (1.2 m) in total length, including a tail 9 inches (23 cm) long. It is brownish-olive above, with most of the scales black-edged. The young have blackish cross bands. Its lower parts are yellowish, with the outer part of the margin of each ventral shield blackish.

Its rostral is as deep as it is broad, and visible from above. The suture between the internasals is much shorter than that between the prefrontals. Its frontal is as long as its distance from the end of the snout or a little shorter, and shorter than the parietals. The loreal is longer than deep, and often united with the prefrontal. It has one large preocular (a small subocular below the preocular is rarely present) and two postoculars. Temporals are 2+2 or 2+3. Normally there are 8 upper labials, the fourth and fifth entering the eye, and 5 lower labials in contact with the anterior chin shields. The anterior chin shields are as long as the posterior chin shields or a little longer. The dorsal scales are in 23 rows, feebly keeled on the posterior part of the body. Ventrals 233–246; anal divided; subcaudals 79–90.

== Geographic range ==
E. hodgsoni is found in China (Tibet), India (Sikkim, Assam, Kashmir), and Nepal.

Type locality: "China: Ladakh" (Günther 1860) = "Tibet: Ladakh, Tsomoriri" (Boulenger 1894).

== Habitat ==
The preferred natural habitat of E. hodgsoni is forest, at altitudes of 1,500–5,000 m (4,900–16,400 ft), but it is also found in agricultural areas and urban areas.

== Behavior ==
E. hodgsoni is terrestrial and diurnal.

== Diet ==
E. hodgsoni preys upon toads, skinks, and rodents.

== Reproduction ==
E. hodgsoni is oviparous. The female lays a clutch of about six eggs, which she guards. The eggs hatch in about 130 days.

== Gallery ==
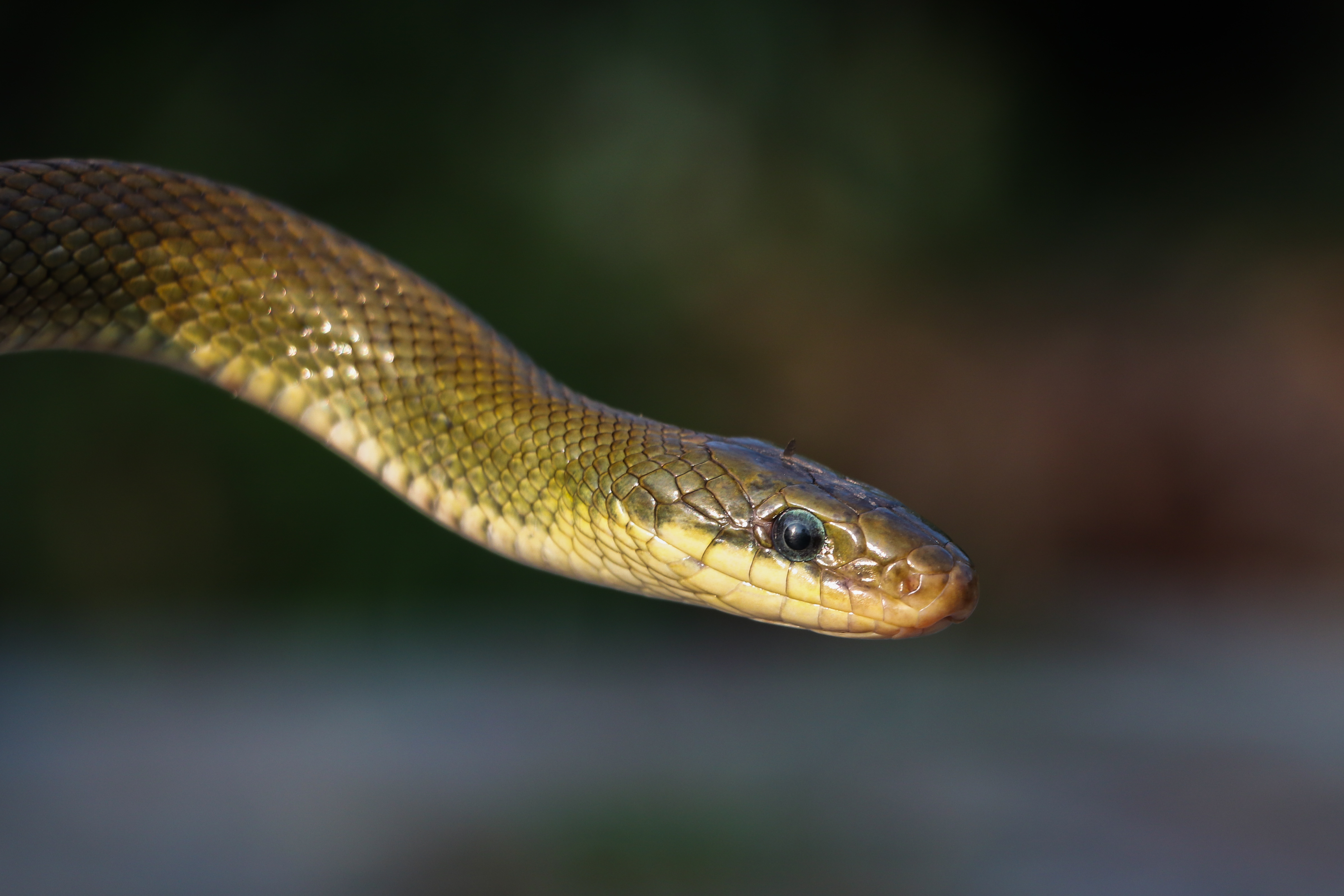
Himalayan Trinket
