= List of museums from the 18th century =

While already in antiquity places like the Temple of Peace exhibited collections (here of bounty of war), the first museums of modern times started to open only in the Renaissance:

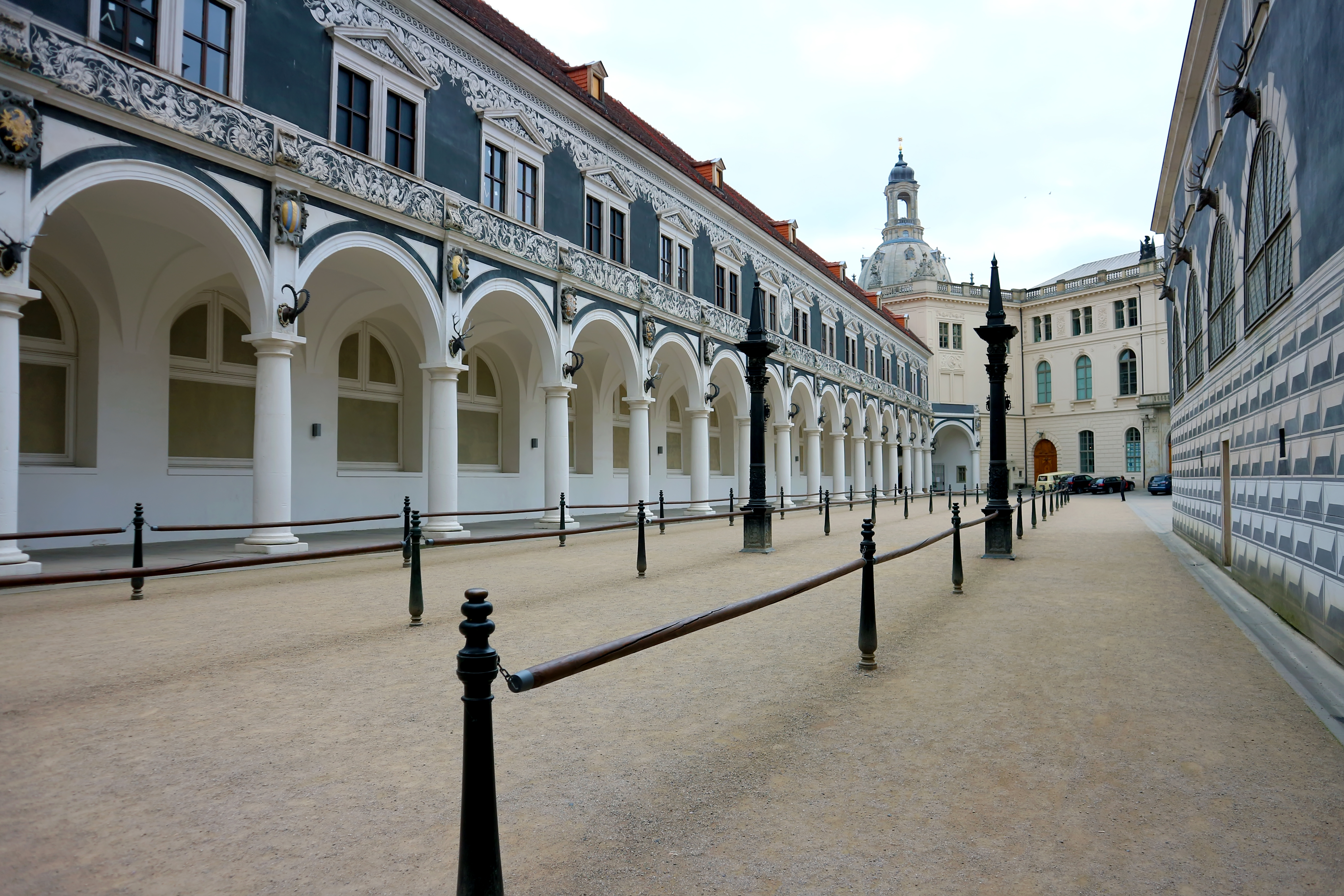
- The Dresden Renaissance Stable was originally much more lavishly painted and contained - partly still existent - ancient collections of arms, saddles as well as figurines and was openly visitable in guided tours from 1588 onwards.
  The first publicly visitable collection of art pieces, exhibiting beside 128 valuable Italian riding art horses some 50 sleds, carved figurines of Black Riders, horses, saddles and arms as well as a painting gallery, was contained in the Dresden Electoral stable, opened to the public in 1588. The collection itself dates however already from the 14th century.
- The Capitoline Museums, the oldest collection of art in the world, began in 1471 when Pope Sixtus IV donated a group of important ancient sculptures to the people of Rome. It was however only opened to the public in 1734.
- The Vatican Museums, traces its origins to the public displayed sculptural collection begun in 1506 by Pope Julius II.
- Ambras Castle (Schloss Ambras Innsbruck), Austria, is not the oldest art collection, but it is the earliest collection still to be found in that very building created especially for its museum purpose (1572–1583, Supplement 1589).

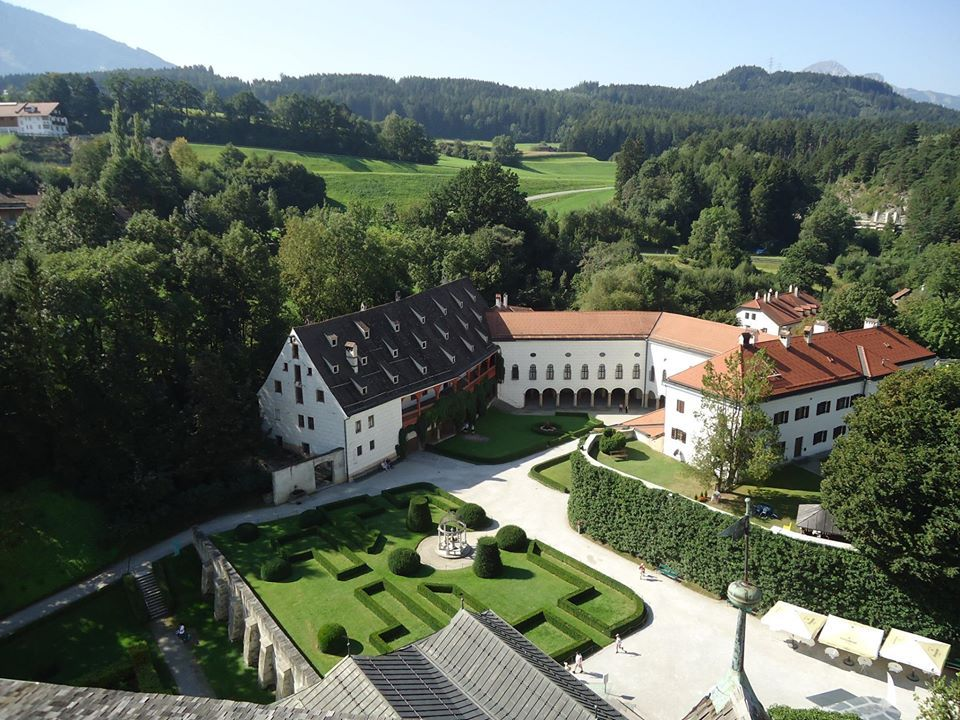
The Lower Castle of Ambras Castle, Innsbruck was one of the earliest buildings explicitly intended for use as a museum and still exists today in its proper function, showing the original collections.

- The Livrustkammaren in Stockholm is one of the oldest museums still in use. Created 1628 by Gustavus Adolphus during the thirty years war. The collection also has the oldest inventory in the world still in use. It has collections from 1558 still on display.
- The Royal Armouries in the Tower of London is the oldest museum in the United Kingdom. It opened to the public in 1660, though there had been paying privileged visitors to the armouries displays from 1592. Today the museum has three sites including its new headquarters in Leeds.
- The Kircherian Museum was opened around 1660 by the Jesuit Athanasius Kircher in the Roman College, exhibiting several of his automata and spectacles, such as his famous sunflower clock.
- Rumphius built a botanical museum in Ambon in 1662; it was succeeded by a museum of the Batavia Society of Art and Science, established on 24 April 1778.
- The Amerbach Cabinet, originally a private collection, was bought by the university and city of Basel in 1661 and opened to the public in 1671.
- The Musée des Beaux-Arts et d'archéologie in Besançon was established in 1694 after Jean-Baptiste Boisot, an abbot, gave his personal collection to the Benedictines of the city in order to create a museum open to the public two days every week.
- The Kunstkamera in St. Petersburg was founded in 1717 in Kikin Hall and officially opened to the public in 1727 in the Old St. Petersburg Academy of Science Building
- The British Museum in London, was founded in 1753 and opened to the public in 1759. Sir Hans Sloane's personal collection of curios provided the initial foundation for the British Museum's collection.
- The Uffizi Gallery in Florence, This art collection was begun in the 15th century by Cosimo de' Medici, enlarged by his descendants, and in 1743 bequeathed by the last heir of the House of Medici "to the people of Tuscany and to all nations". The Uffizi Palace (built 1560–1581) was designed by the Renaissance painter and architect Giorgio Vasari. The top floors were converted to gallery space, open to visitors on request, and then opened to the public as a museum in 1769 by Grand Duke Peter Leopold.
- The Museum of the History of Riga and Navigation is the oldest in Latvia and the whole of the Baltics, and one of the oldest in Europe. It was founded and opened to public in 1773 by the Riga Town Council as Himsel Museum. The rich and diverse collections of the museum originated from an art and natural sciences collection of Nikolaus von Himsel (1729–1764), a Riga doctor. Today the Museum of the History of Riga and Navigation collections number more than 500 000 items, systematised in about 80 collections.
- The Hermitage Museum was founded in 1764 by Catherine the Great and has been open to the public since 1852.
- The Museo del Prado in Madrid was founded in 1785 by Charles III of Spain, originally to house the Natural History Cabinet. Later, the building was converted into the new Royal Museum of Paintings and Sculptures, opened to the public in 1819, with the aim of showing the works of art belonging to the Spanish Crown. Nowadays, with the nearby Thyssen-Bornemisza Museum and the Museo Reina Sofía, it forms the so-called Golden Triangle of Art.
- The Belvedere Palace of the Habsburg monarchs in Vienna opened with a collection of art in 1781.
- The Teylers Museum in Haarlem (The Netherlands) established in 1778 and is the oldest Dutch museum.
- The Louvre Museum in Paris (France), also a former royal palace, opened to the public in 1793.
- The Brukenthal National Museum, erected in the late 18th century in Sibiu, Transylvania, Romania, housed in the palace of Samuel von Brukenthal—who was Habsburg governor of Transylvania and who established its first collections around 1790. The collections were officially opened to the public in 1817, making it the oldest institution of its kind in Romania.
- The museum of the American Philosophical Society in Philadelphia dates to 1743, making it the oldest museum in the United States.
- The Charleston Museum was established in 1773 thereby making it the first museum in the Southern United States. It did not open to the public until 1824.
- Charles Willson Peale established his Philadelphia Museum, America's first public museum, in 1786 in Philadelphia's Independence Hall in 1786. It closed by the 1840s.
