= Malcolm Pryce =

British author (born 1960)

Malcolm Pryce (born 1960) is a British author, mostly known for his noir detective novels.

== Biography ==
Born in Shrewsbury, England, Pryce moved at the age of nine to Aberystwyth, where he later attended Penglais Comprehensive School before leaving to do some travelling. After working in a variety of jobs, including BMW assembly-line worker in Germany, hotel washer-up, "the world's worst aluminium salesman" and deckhand on a yacht in Polynesia, Pryce became an advertising copywriter in London and Singapore. He is currently resident in Oxford.

== Writing career ==
Pryce writes in the style of Raymond Chandler and has been labelled "the king of Welsh noir". His Aberystwyth Noir novels are incongruously set on the rainswept streets of an alternate universe version of the Welsh seaside resort and university town of Aberystwyth. The hero of these novels is Louie Knight, the best private detective in Aberystwyth (also the only private detective in Aberystwyth), who battles crime organised by the local Druids, investigates the strange case of the town's disappearing youths, and gets involved in its burgeoning film industry, which produces What The Butler Saw movies.

Pryce has also written The Case of the 'Hail Mary' Celeste and Aberystwyth Noir - It Ain't Over till the Bearded Lady Sings, a BBC Radio 4 Afternoon Drama, first broadcast on 15 May 2013, featuring Louie Knight and produced and directed by Kate McAll.

== Bibliography ==
=== Aberystwyth noir ===
- Aberystwyth Mon Amour, 2001, Bloomsbury Publishing, ISBN 978-0-7475-5786-9
- Last Tango in Aberystwyth, 2003, Bloomsbury Publishing, ISBN 978-0-7475-6676-2
- The Unbearable Lightness of Being in Aberystwyth, 2005, Bloomsbury Publishing, ISBN 978-0-7475-7894-9
- Don't Cry for Me Aberystwyth, 2007, Bloomsbury Publishing, ISBN 978-0-7475-8016-4
- From Aberystwyth with Love, 2009, Bloomsbury Publishing, ISBN 978-0-7475-9519-9
- The Day Aberystwyth Stood Still, 2011, Bloomsbury Publishing, ISBN 978-1-4088-1025-5
- A Streetcar Named Aberystwyth, 2024, Zoo of Words, ISBN 978-1068639807

=== The Case Files of Jack Wenlock, Railway Detective ===
- The Case of the 'Hail Mary' Celeste, 2015, Bloomsbury Publishing, ISBN 978-1-4088-5193-7
- The Corpse in the Garden of Perfect Brightness, 2020, Bloomsbury Publishing, ISBN 978-1-4088-9529-0

This author should not be confused with a different author of the same name, who has written the following books:

- A Dragon to Agincourt, 2003, Y Lolfa, ISBN 978-0-86243-684-1
- With Madog to the New World, 2005, Y Lolfa, ISBN 978-0-86243-758-9

== See also ==
- Louie Knight
