= The Train in the Snow =

1875 painting by Claude Monet

- Le train dans la neige (French)
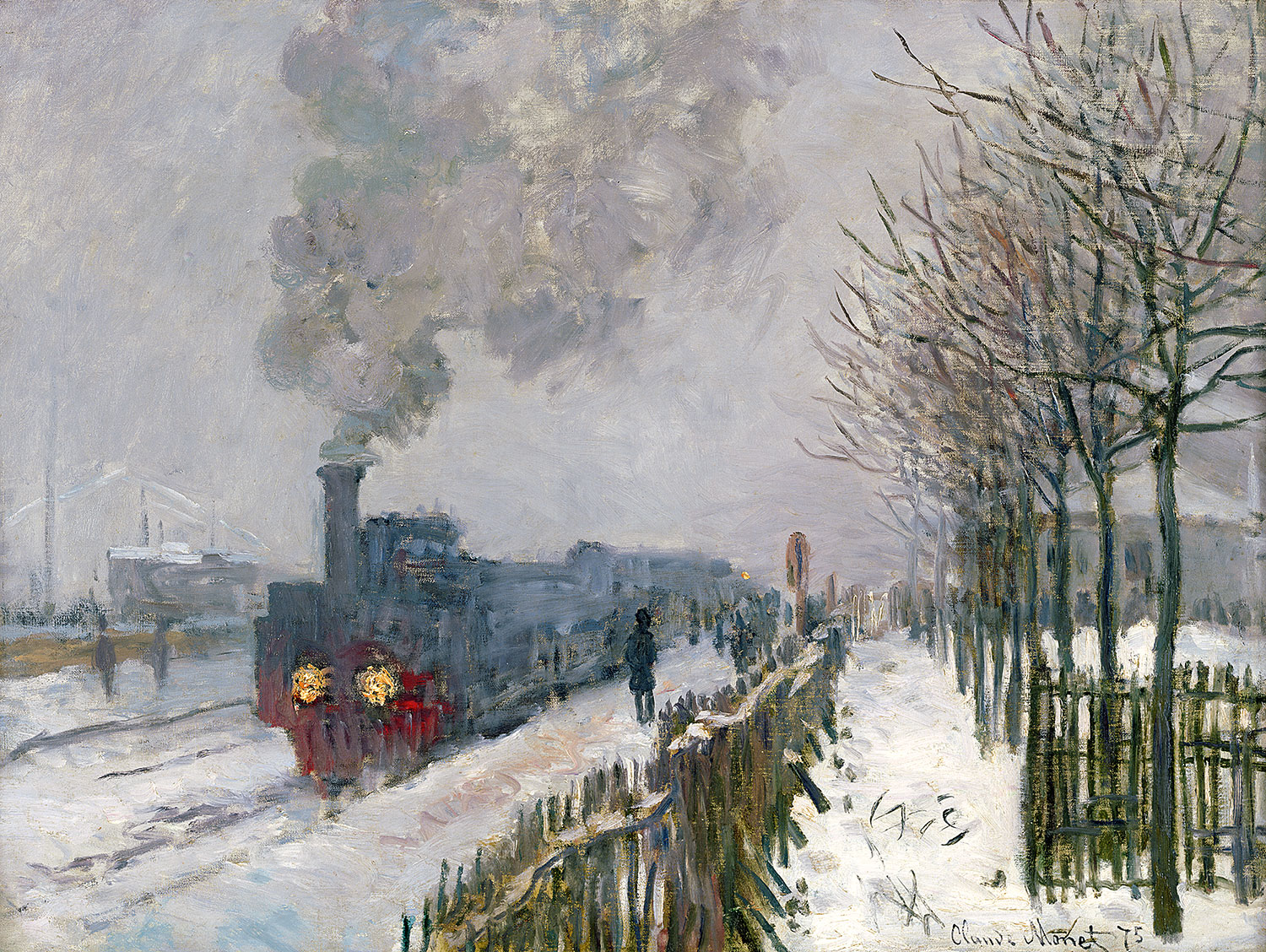
- Artist: Claude Monet
- Year: 1875
- Medium: Oil paint
- Movement: Impressionism
- Dimensions: 59 cm × 78 cm (23 in × 31 in)
- Location: Musee Marmottan Monet, Paris

The Train in the Snow, or Le train dans la neige, is a landscape painting by the French Impressionist artist Claude Monet. The work depicts a train surrounded by snow at the Argenteuil station in France. Art historians see the work as a significant example of Monet's efforts to integrate nature and industry in his work. Many historians believe that Monet, out of all of the notable nineteenth century artists, made the most paintings of trains in his lifetime.

Art historians typically emphasize the dividing lines of the piece created by the fence, trees, and tracks as well as the dark smoke produced by the locomotive. However, these historians derive different meanings from the painting, though they overall reference themes of industry and motion. Scholars also note the important connections between Monet's painting and contemporary works of literature, particularly those of Emile Zola.

== Background ==
With the outbreak of the Franco-Prussian War, Monet and his newly wedded wife Camille fled to England for fear of Monet's military conscription. Returning to France in late 1871, the couple settled in Argenteuil along the Seine. While many of Monet's paintings of trains come from the Gare St. Lazare Station, The Train in the Snow represents Argenteuil station, which was the artist's "commuter stop." At the time of Monet's residence, Argenteuil was located in a suburban section of France, connected by railway to Paris, Le Havre, and Rouen; trains and engines were in constant view at Argenteuil station because of their storage or redirection there.

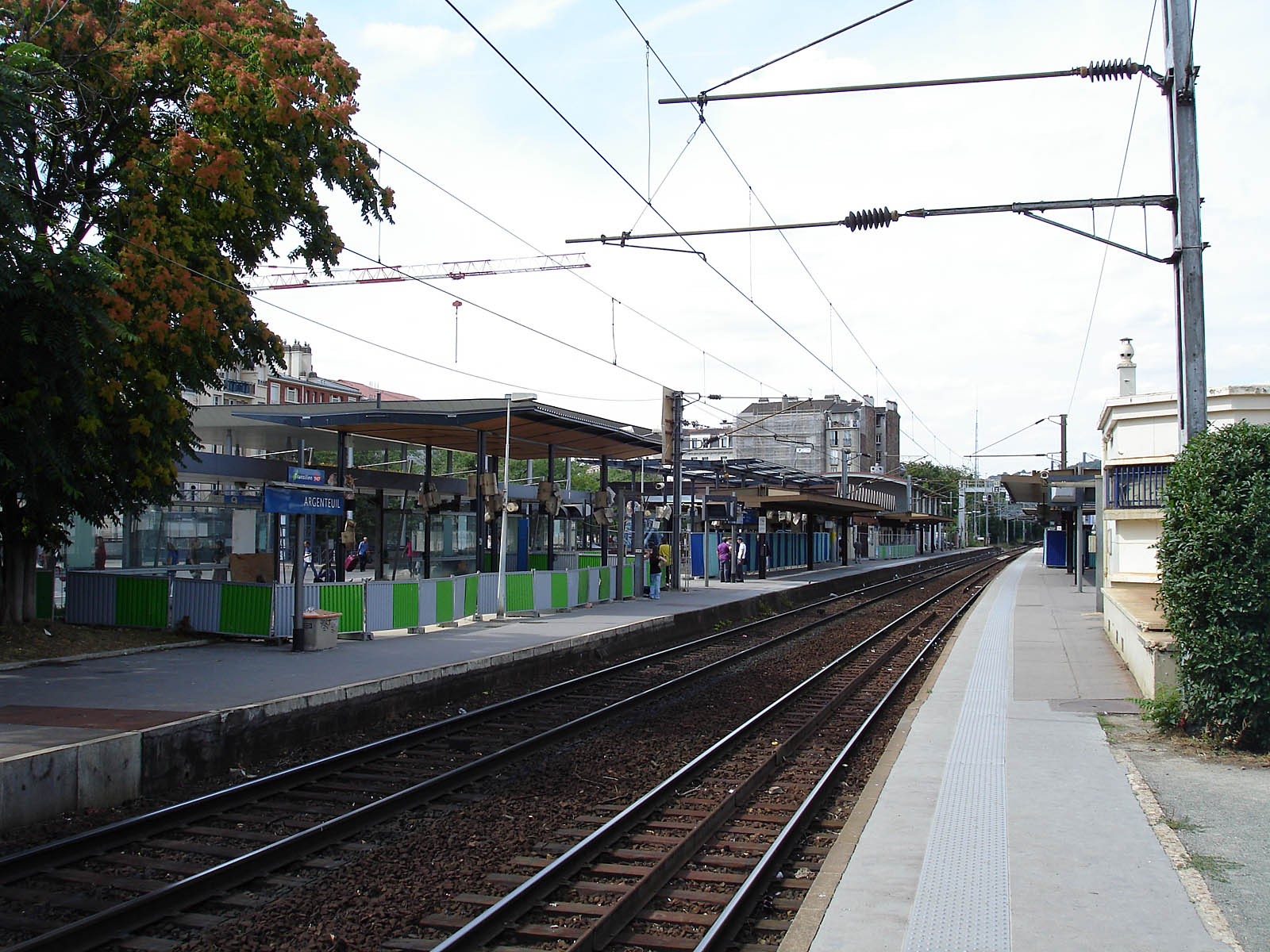
Modern Argenteuil Station

Throughout the winter of 1874-1875, Monet continuously painted snow scenes in and around his home at Argenteuil. Fascinated by the trains traveling through his local station on their way to Paris, the artist worked on his paintings while standing on the station platform. Out of his many paintings of trains, Monet seems to have only painted three scenes from 1875-1876 that take place in the snow, including this particular painting.

== Description and compositional analysis ==
=== Content ===
The painting depicts a steam-driven train arriving at Argenteuil Station, where many travelers are gathered on the platform waiting to board. As in most of Monet's snowscapes at Argenteuil, the composition of The Train in the Snow is animated by figures who serve to enliven the cold landscape. The signal man, for example, prepares for the train's departure as he stands towards the front of the engine, adjacent to the stop sign on the platform.

=== Use of color ===
Monet's use of color brings the composition together. Art historian and curator Marianne Delafond focuses her analysis of the painting on the smoke that billows from the dark train; she describes the smoke as "belching" outward from the train and blending into the "sky as cold and grey as the snow covering the track." Similarly, literary scholar Marian Robinson describes the smoke as a kind of "bas-relief against the duller sky." However, the smoke is not monochromatic as there are hints of purple within the mist. Other hints of color present within the painting include red and yellow lights emanating from the dark locomotive. The red, focused most intensely at the front of the train, seems to "bloody the snow." The yellow lights, in contrast, are not only brightly painted on the front of the engine, but appear at the vanishing point as well.

=== Technique and effects ===
Art historian Paul Hayes Tucker emphasizes the depth of Monet's painting in his interpretation; despite the viewer's vantage point being no more than 30 meters away from the train, Tucker claims that "industry and the grittier side of modern developments seem far away." The main part of the train, though it is relatively close to the viewer, is "suffused and dematerialized in the snow-filled air." The Train in the Snow is also widely seen as an example of Monet's attempts during the 1870s to reconcile receding perspective with his exploration of surface effects. These surface effects are produced by Monet's own dark signature and the "vigorous accents added on the snow... very late in the execution of the canvas," thus giving the composition a textured effect. Furthermore, the effect of the train cars and station platform disappearing on the horizon are achieved through the "hazy outline" that blends the solid elements with the sky.

Tucker also notes how the train, though evidently stopped at the station, implies movement. He attributes this optical illusion to Monet's use of converging lines created by the diagonals of the trees, fence, and train tracks, as well as the "sleek" nature of the engine itself. Marian Robinson further claims that the "suggestion of motion and power" in Monet's engines provides "an apocalyptic vision of potential destruction" brought on by the Industrial Revolution.

Art historians have offered further comments on the use of diagonals in the painting. John House describes the wooden fences as an interruption of the "flow of space" because they divide up the foreground of the scene. James Rubin, on the other hand, believes that the lines of the fence and trees combined with the "softening effects of snow" sets the train in the "residential refuge" of suburban Argenteuil. Rubin also believes that the neat row of trees reflects the station's "recent landscaping," emphasizing the effects of the Industrial Revolution.

== Interpretation and reception ==
=== Monet and Zola ===
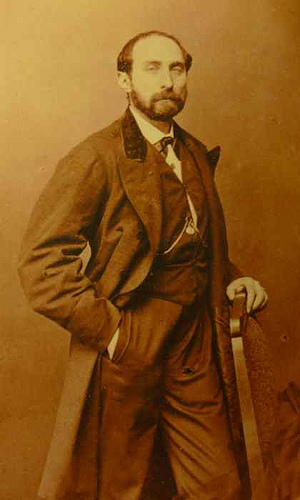
Dr. Georges de Bellio, purchaser of The Train in the Snow

Marian Robinson emphasizes the connection between this work and French novelist Emile Zola's writing. Robinson notes a particular scene in Zola's novel La Bete Humaine that seems to echo the imagery of Monet's The Train in the Snow; she claims that Monet's engine "bloodies" the snow in the same way that is described in Zola's imagined scene, which also features a train caught in a snowfall or blizzard. Additionally, Robinson claims that Monet's colors in The Train in the Snow "tint the dullness," matching "the ominous heaviness of Zola's brief scene." Zola was familiar with Monet's train paintings, writing a positive review about them on display at the Third Impressionist Exhibition held in April 1877. Tucker also notes the similarities between Monet's "poetic" portrayal of the railway in The Train in the Snow and Zola's later writings.

=== Provenance ===
The Train in the Snow was purchased from Monet by Doctor Georges de Bellio. De Bellio urged Monet to sell it to him or keep it himself as he was afraid that the painting would "fall into the hands of a fool." After his successful purchase, the doctor loaned The Train in the Snow to a Monet exhibition at the Galerie Durand-Ruel in 1883, where it attracted much positive attention from critics. In 1940, the painting was donated to the Musée Marmottan Monet in Paris by Bellio's daughter and son-in-law, Victorine and Don Eugene Donop de Monchy, where it remains today.

== Gallery ==
Monet's train scenes at Argenteuil
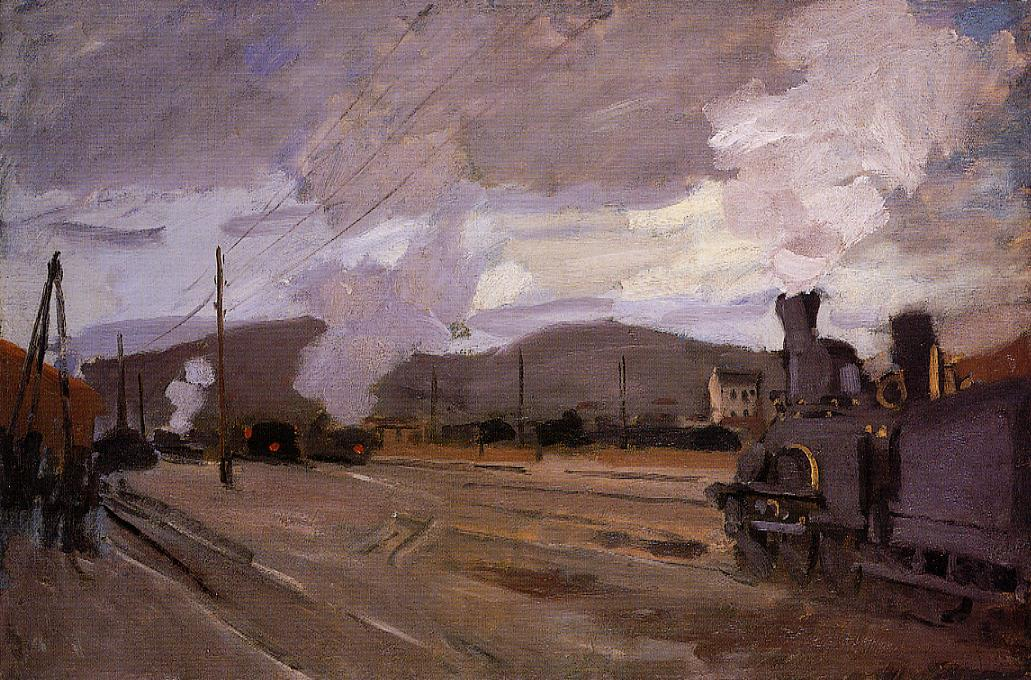
The Railroad Station at Argenteuil (1872)

== See also ==
- Gare Saint-Lazare (Monet Series)
- List of paintings by Claude Monet
