= Aberystwyth noir =

Fictional Character

Aberystwyth Noir
- The cover of Aberystwyth Mon Amour showing Louie and Bianca.
- Aberystwyth Mon Amour; Last Tango in Aberystwyth; The Unbearable Lightness of Being in Aberystwyth; Don't Cry for Me Aberystwyth; From Aberystwyth with Love; The Day Aberystwyth Stood Still; A Streetcar Named Aberystwyth
- Author: Malcolm Pryce
- Country: United Kingdom
- Language: English
- Publisher: Bloomsbury Publishing, Zoo of Words
- Published: 2001
- Media type: Print (Paperback)

Aberystwyth Noir is a series of novels by British author Malcolm Pryce. The series focuses on the character of Louie Knight and is set in an alternative universe of the Welsh town of Aberystwyth, where the main religions in this alternative Wales are both Christianity and the druids, who are power mad gangsters, who use murder, extortion, prostitution, and police corruption to maintain their influence.

The series was first published in the United Kingdom in 2001 through Bloomsbury Publishing. The publishing company released five more books in the series. There was a gap in publication until 2024, when Pryce self-published the seventh volume, A Streetcar Named Aberystwyth.

== Synopsis ==
Louie Knight is Aberystwyth's only detective, but this Aberystwyth is a more dynamic, seedy place run by gangsters. In 1961 it contributed many of the soldiers who fought in the Patagonian War (described as a "Welsh Vietnam"), and so 'vets' roam around Aberystwyth disheartened at what they had to do to prevent independence of this Welsh colony (founded by Welsh settlers in real life, although never under direct Welsh, or British, rule). A flood caused by the 'Dambusters' style bombing attack on the Nant y Moch Dam above Aberystwyth wiped out much vital infrastructure, but was rebuilt quickly. The flood had been created to launch an ark being built on the school playing grounds to give the druids access to the semi-legendary (actually real in this universe) Cantref-y-Gwaelod (Cantre'r Gwaelod) . This devastating cultural event undermined the power of the Druids and led to the emergence of new figures; namely the night club owner Jubal, and a meals on wheels lady, who used her food supplies after the flood to gain influence. Louie and his friend Llunos, tried to stop the bombing run over the dam, but failed, something for which he sometimes feels guilty.

A few years on and Louie Knight does most of his work on small-time jobs, but often involving violence; a former lover, Bianca, died in his arms in Aberystwyth Mon Amour, and he nearly lost his assistant 'Calamity' (a nod to Calamity Jane) to a snuff movie in Last Tango in Aberystwyth, and saves his girlfriend, Myfanwy, from an evil genius. In The Unbearable Lightness of Being in Aberystwyth Myfanwy is kidnapped when she and Louie are fed drugged raspberry ripple ice cream. This worries him especially because Myfanwy is very ill, with Louie having to support her in a nursing home on the low earnings of an honest, small town PI. To facilitate this he now lives in a caravan, and has moved his office from the increasingly gentrified Canticle Street to 22/1b Stryd-Y-Popty. (Note: Stryd-Y-Popty also translates as Baker street)

== Publication history ==
The first book in the series, Aberystwyth Mon Amour, was published in 2001 through Bloomsbury Publishing. Pryce would continue to release a volume every other year through Bloomsbury up to 2011's The Day Aberystwyth Stood Still, the sixth book in the series. Prior to its release Bloomsbury informed Pryce that they were not interested in continuing the series. Pryce did not release any further entries in the series until 2024, when he self-published the seventh volume, A Streetcar Named Aberystwyth, through Zoo of Words. When speaking to the Cambrian News, Pryce noted that he would receive emails on a weekly basis from fans asking why he did not continue the series.

=== Novels ===
- Aberystwyth Mon Amour, 2001, Bloomsbury Publishing, ISBN 978-0-7475-5786-9
- Last Tango in Aberystwyth, 2003, Bloomsbury Publishing, ISBN 978-0-7475-6676-2
- The Unbearable Lightness of Being in Aberystwyth, 2005, Bloomsbury Publishing, ISBN 978-0-7475-7894-9
- Don't Cry for Me Aberystwyth, 2007, Bloomsbury Publishing, ISBN 978-0-7475-8016-4
- From Aberystwyth with Love, 2009, Bloomsbury Publishing, ISBN 978-0-7475-9519-9
- The Day Aberystwyth Stood Still, 2011, Bloomsbury Publishing, ISBN 978-1-4088-1025-5
- A Streetcar Named Aberystwyth, 2024, Zoo of Words, ISBN 978-1068639807

== Characters ==
Main characters across the series only

Louie Knight is Aberystwyth's one private detective. He is a bitter, cynical man haunted by the death of his best friend Marty at school, by his inability to stop the dam raid and various old loves who have suffered various tragedies, notably Bianca and Myfanwy. After working as a policeman in Swansea he became a PI and moved to Aberystwyth, although what made him leave regular policing is never explained. He is passionately in love with Myfanwy, only taking her case because he loved her in Mon Amour. His agency is called Knight Errant investigations (a joke he now winces at), although his card reads Louie Knight, Gumshoe. He has a long running hatred of Mrs. Llantrisant (who plays a role as infrequent Moriarty to Louie's Holmes). Working out of an office at 22/1b Stryd-Y-Popty he is unaware he is a detective living in what literally translates as 'Baker Street', and he lives in a caravan so that he can swim in the sea, where he feels most relaxed under the waves. He drinks Captain Morgan rum, preferring it to the stereotypical whisky because, despite a similar alcohol content, rum comes from sunny islands, while whisky comes from Scotland.

As regards the 'backstory', Louie never knew the love of a mother, as she died when he was only one year old - he has a picture of her on his desk. Notably an ancestor, Noel Bartholomew, went to Borneo during the Victorian era to rescue a woman he had never met, so Louie suspects there is a 'stupid errands' gene in his family, especially as his ancestor died on that mission. Bartholomew's journal is stored by Louie, along with a shrunken head in a trunk, and a map of Borneo on the wall. The other picture in Louie's office is that of Humphrey Bogart in Casablanca - symbolic of many a loner, and in tune with the "noir" feel of the series.

Myfanwy Montez was a beautiful nightclub singer from before the flood, and one of the few women to capture Louie's heart. She also captured the heart of Dai Brainbocs, who later kidnapped her. So far she is living in a nursing home paid for by Louie, who still loves her madly. She suffered the debilitating after effects of a love potion, concocted by Dai to try to make her love him; a potion based on neurochemistry, so very dangerous. By the end of The Unbearable Lightness Dai seemed to have found a cure for what was killing her, but this is by no means assured. In Don't Cry For Me Aberystwyth she has improved, but is given to bouts of darkness - running away from Louie until he hunted her down (chasing the Shrewsbury bus) and convinced her that he still loved her.

"Calamity" Jane, originally from Machynlleth, is Louie's assistant, whom he met as a tout in the Bingo hall during Aberystwyth Mon Amour. Aged 18 by The Unbearable Lightness she is more optimistic than Louie, and seems to base her detective technique on films. She investigated the old fire at Nanteos for a strange client, Gabriel Bassett, to gain her detectives licence. Her relationship with Louie is purely platonic, but no other lover of hers has been mentioned so far.

Dai Brainbocs is the evil scientific genius who Louie runs into. Dai is obsessed with Myfanwy and abducted her twice to try to make her love him. Physically he stopped growing aged 14, and has to use a wheelchair to get about. A truly brilliant school boy genius who discovered Cantref Gwaelod, reads and writes runes and even faked his own death in Mon Amour, he is described as a danger to humanity. His Promethean urge to do the unthinkable makes him dangerous, as does his emotional and moral detachment from experiments (e.g. trying to clone Jesus). At the end of The Unbearable Lightness he had found a potential cure for Myfanwy, and had turned his hideout into Myfanwy's idea of heaven as described in a school essay she wrote aged 9. What happened to him after he cured Myfanwy is not explained in the latest book, but he may have been returned to Shrewsbury prison.

Police Chief Llunos is tasked with keeping order in Aberystwyth. Hampered by official corruption and a limited budget he still tries to help Louie wherever possible. Both he and Louie were in the plane that bombed the dam attempting to stop it. His grandfather was one of the first 'Peelers' (Policeman) in Britain, something Llunos feels proud of; he is writing a book about him during The Unbearable Lightness. He is a cultured man who, despite his brutality, quotes Shakespeare (The Merchant of Venice in The Unbearable Lightness) and reads Latin. He has as a 'thinking spot' an old police office in Aberystwyth that has been abandoned - it is here that he keeps the infant skulls discovered at the Waifery. The willingness of central Police division to send him officers from Swansea to subvert his authority suggests he has made enemies higher up in the hierarchy.

Sospan (Welsh for 'Saucepan'); the promenade's ice-cream seller cum philosopher, and tipster to Louie. It is implied that he has a dark past, but Louie wonders whether his dark secret is that he has no secret. He specialises in weird ice cream flavours, such as absinthe, and has ironic names for his ice cream, notably his (now withdrawn) "hornucopia". Many fans believe he did covert work during the Patagonian war, although the jagged scar on his cheek is the only evidence of a more violent previous life. The opening chapter of Aberystwyth Mon Amour quotes him as saying he does not have friends, because he loses too many work days attending funerals, which is symbolic of Sospan's moral detachment. In The Unbearable Lightness he orders Louie never to ask him how he came by his scar, and it is revealed that in all the time Louie has known him he has never left his booth. He tells Louie that he has an arrangement with the local magistrate -"I don't judge and he doesn't sell ice-cream in his court".

Eeyore is Louie's father, and the man who runs donkey rides along the promenade. Previously a member of the local police force, he retired early for reasons unknown; his career involved tracking Frankie Mephisto (a gangster) and arresting a Raven (a Druid assassin). A widower, he is devoted to his son and also his donkeys. His name is, unsurprisingly, a reference to Eeyore.

Mrs. Llantrisant swabbed Louie's steps in Aberystwyth Mon Amour, but also led a double life, plotting to destroy the Aberystwyth dam. Having originally gone over as a prostitute, she later became famous as a fighter during the Patagonian War where Lieutenant Llantrisant was more often known as Gwenno Guevara - a ruthless fighter and torturer. She wrote a book about forensic meteorology called "Red Sky at Night", which Calamity used to solve the riddle of the Nanteos fire. She was head of ESSJAT - an elite secret force of radical Christians against corruption, hence her interest in creating a flood...another deluge. After her role as bombardier for the dam raid she was imprisoned on an island near Aberystwyth until she escaped in Last Tango and with Herod Jenkins. At the end of Last Tango she is missing, believed dead and in Don't Cry for Me she is in a travelling circus dying of some unknown illness (potentially voodoo magic). It is not known why she is known as Mrs. Llantrisant, and there has never been mention of a Mr Llantrisant.

Herod Jenkins is Louie's old PE teacher, and responsible for sending Louie's best friend Marty on a cross country run in weather that "even the SAS on the Brecon Beacons would have avoided". He has a squat but powerful physique, and a thin lipped smile that Louie believes looks more like a post box slot than a sign of affection. Louie believed he had killed Herod in Aberystwyth Mon Amour by knocking him out of the bomber, but he survived the fall and lost his memory. During Last Tango he was re-programmed to believe he was Hungarian by the Welsh Army for an experiment, but latent memories of Rugby union and his lover Mrs. Llantrisant caused him to remember his true identity and he escaped the Police with Mrs. Llantrisant over the mountains. He returns as a circus strong man, and later under the alias 'Hoffman' in Don't Cry For Me Aberystwyth where we learn that he worked as a torturer in South America where he was involved with the Nazis. 'Hoffman' was derived from his German codename HFM (an abbreviation of the German for 'Horizontal smile man') and as such Mossad have been hunting him ever since the name 'Hoffman' emerged during the interrogation of Adolf Eichmann.

Cadwaladr fought in the Patagonian war, and is one of the few remaining veterans who still live in Aberystwyth. Having met Louie over a luxurious picnic in Mon Amour he later saved Louie from the police when he was accused of Bianca's murder, helped Louie track down Calamity in Last Tango, and defended Rimbaud (another veteran) when Rimbaud was the chief suspect in Myfanwy's abduction. His experiences haunt him, and he has flashbacks to killing and fighting in Patagonia. He had a job painting the Borth Bridge year after year, but in Don't Cry for Me they developed a new kind of paint which lasts 10 years robbing him of a job, but giving him a large severance pay. He now lives in a camper van.

== Development ==
Pryce came up with the concept for the series while working for an ad agency in Singapore. He began writing the series in the Far East; Pryce has stated that he could not have written the first novel in his home in Great Britain. Eventually poor health forced Pryce to return home, where he continued to write the series.

== Adaptations and popular culture ==
=== Radio play ===
In 2013 BBC Radio 4 created a radio play based upon the Aberystwyth Noir series entitled Aberystwyth Noir - It Ain't Over till the Bearded Lady Sings. Written by Pryce as a new, stand-alone story, the radio play ran as part of the station's Afternoon Drama programme and was produced and directed by Kate McAll. Phylip Harries starred as Louie Knight, while Catrin Stewart and Rhodri Meilir portrayed Calamity Jane and Sospan, respectively. Matthew Gravelle portrayed several characters: Mr. Marmalade, Piccolino, Herod Jenkins, and Eeyore.

=== Stage play ===
In 2016 a stage play adaptation of the first novel in the series, Aberystwyth Mon Amour, premiered in Wales. Abigail Anderson directed a script written by Pryce; Matt Addis starred as Louie Knight, other performers included Llinos Daniel as Myfanwy, Phyl Harries as Sospan, Catrin Mai-Huw as Calamity, Non Haf as Bianca, David Prince as Herod Jenkins, Sonia Beck as Mrs. Llantrisant, and Adrian Metcalfe as Eeyore.

=== In popular culture ===
A literary walking tour was created in Aberystwyth, where participants travel to locations present in the series.

== Reception ==
Maxim Jakubowski reviewed the first novel for The Guardian, writing that "You'll either love or hate the sly humour, but I challenge anyone not to roar aloud at the final plot twist. Already one of my books of the year."
