= Parergon =

Ancient Greek philosophical concept

In semiotics, a parergon (paˈrərˌgän; plural: parerga) is a supplementary issue or embellishment. The term's usage has broadened to mean anything that is additional to the main body of a creative work.

== Origin ==
The literal meaning of the ancient Greek term is "beside, or additional to the work". Parergon has a negative connotation within Greek classical thought, since it is against ergon or the true matter.

== Modern usage ==
Immanuel Kant used parergon in his philosophy. In his works, he associated it with ergon, which in his view is the "work" of one's field (e.g. work of art, work of literature, and work of music, etc.). According to Kant, parergon is what is beyond ergon. It is what columns are to buildings or the frame to a painting. He provided three examples of parergon: 1) clothing on a statue; 2) columns on a building; and, 3) the frame of a painting. He likened it to an ornament, one that primarily appeals to the senses. Kant's conceptualization influenced Jacques Derrida's usage of the term, particularly how it served as an agent of deconstruction using Kant's conceptualization of the painting's frame.

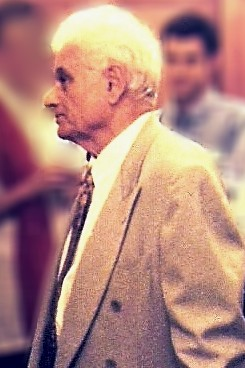
Jacques Derrida explained his interpretation of parergon in The Truth in Painting, associating it with the so-called "great philosophical question, "What is art?".

According to Jacques Derrida, it is "summoned and assembled like a supplement because of the lack – a certain 'internal indetermination – in the very thing it enframes". It is added to a system to augment something lacking such as in the case of ergon (function, task or work), with parergon constituting an internal structural link that makes its unity possible.

Parergon is also described as separate – that it is detached not only from the thing it enframes but also from the outside (the wall where a painting is hung or the space in which the object stands). This conceptualization underscores the significance of parergon for thinkers such as Derrida and Heidegger as it makes the split in the duality of intellect/senses. It plays an important rule in aesthetic judgment if it augments the pleasure of taste. It diminishes in value if it is not formally beautiful, lapsing as a simple adornment. According to Kant, this case is like a gilt frame of a painting, a mere attachment to gain approval through its charm and could even detract from the genuine beauty of the art.

Derrida cited parergon in his wider theory of deconstruction, using it with the term "supplement" to denote the relationship between the core and the periphery and reverse the order of priority so that it becomes possible for the supplement – the outside, secondary and inessential – to be the core or the centerpiece. In The Truth in Painting, the philosopher likened parergon with the frame, borders, and marks of boundaries, which are capable of "unfixing" any stability so that conceptual oppositions are dismantled. It is, for the philosopher, "neither work (ergon) nor outside work", disconcerting any opposition while not remaining indeterminate. For Derrida, parergon is also fundamental, particularly to the ergon since, without it, it "cannot distinguish itself from itself".

In artistic works, parergon is viewed as separate from an artwork it frames but merges with the milieu, which allows it to merge with the work of art.

In a book, parergon can be the liminal devices that mediate it to its reader such as title, foreword, epigraph, preface, etc. It can also be a short literary piece added to the main volume such as the case of James Beattie's The Castle of Scepticism. This is an allegory written as a parergon and was included in the philosopher's main work called Essay on truth, which criticized David Hume, Voltaire, and Thomas Hobbes.

== Wider usage ==
Parergon is the title of the journal of the Australian and New Zealand Association for Medieval and Early Modern Studies, launched in 1983.
