= Constitution Hill =

Constitution Hill may refer to:

- Constitution Hill, New South Wales, Australia
- Constitution Hill, Aberystwyth
- Constitution Hill, Birmingham
- Constitution Hill, London, a road in the City of Westminster in London
- Constitution Hill, Swansea
- Constitution Hill, Johannesburg, South Africa
- Constitution Hill, Dublin, Republic of Ireland
- Constitution Hill, Quezon City, Philippines
- Constitution Hill, Auckland, New Zealand
- Constitution Hill (horse), a thoroughbred racehorse
