= Aberystwyth =

Town and community in Ceredigion, Wales

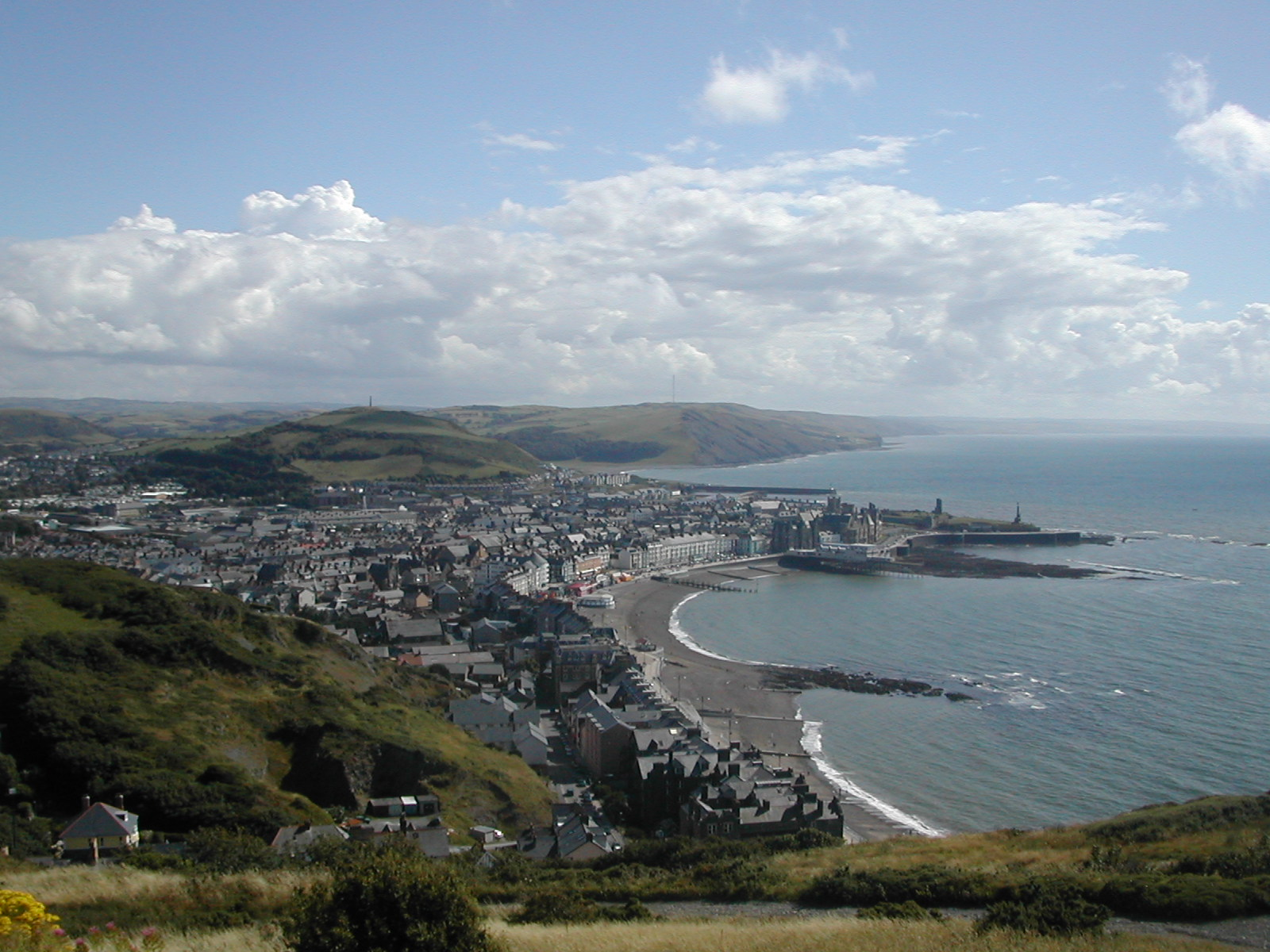
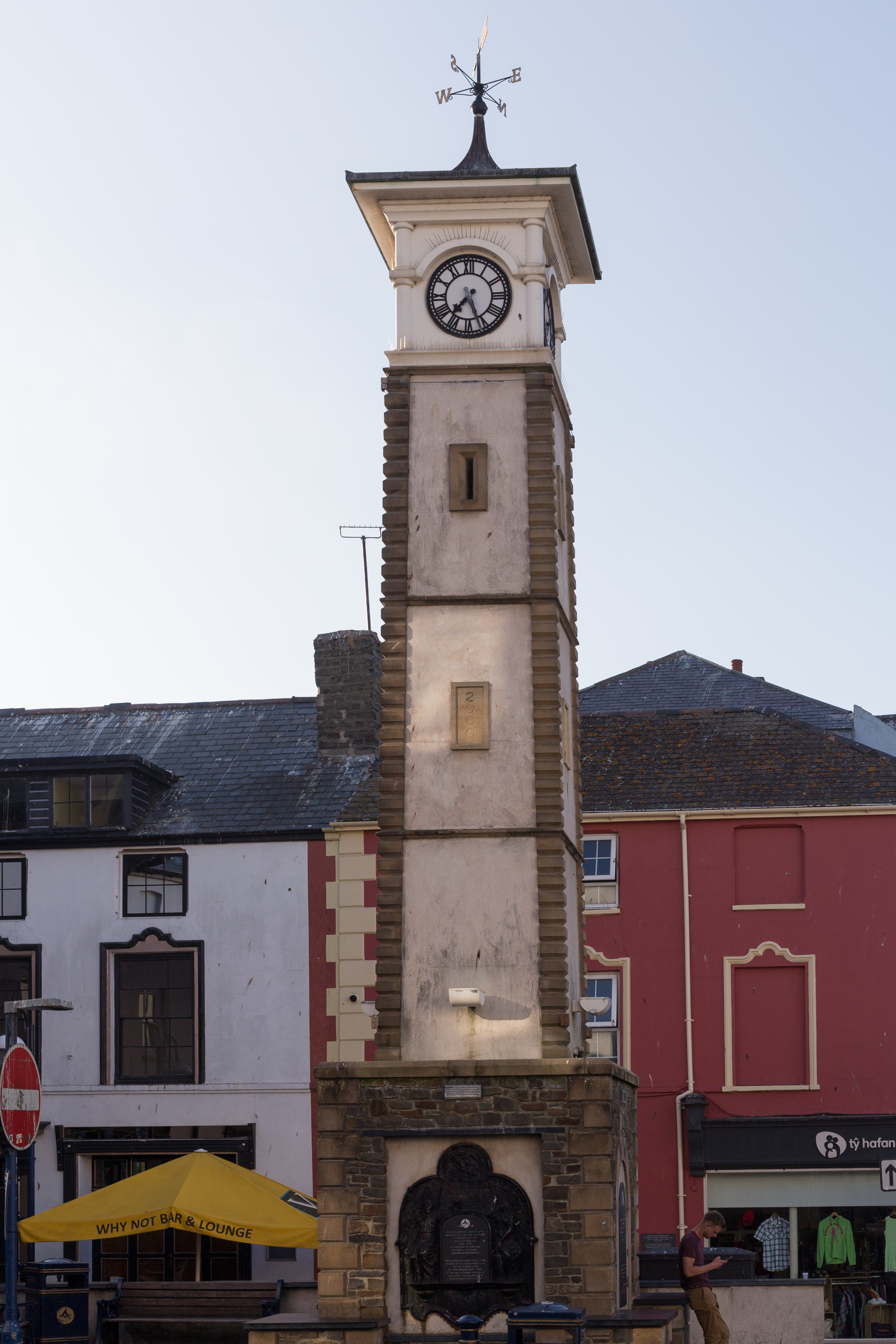
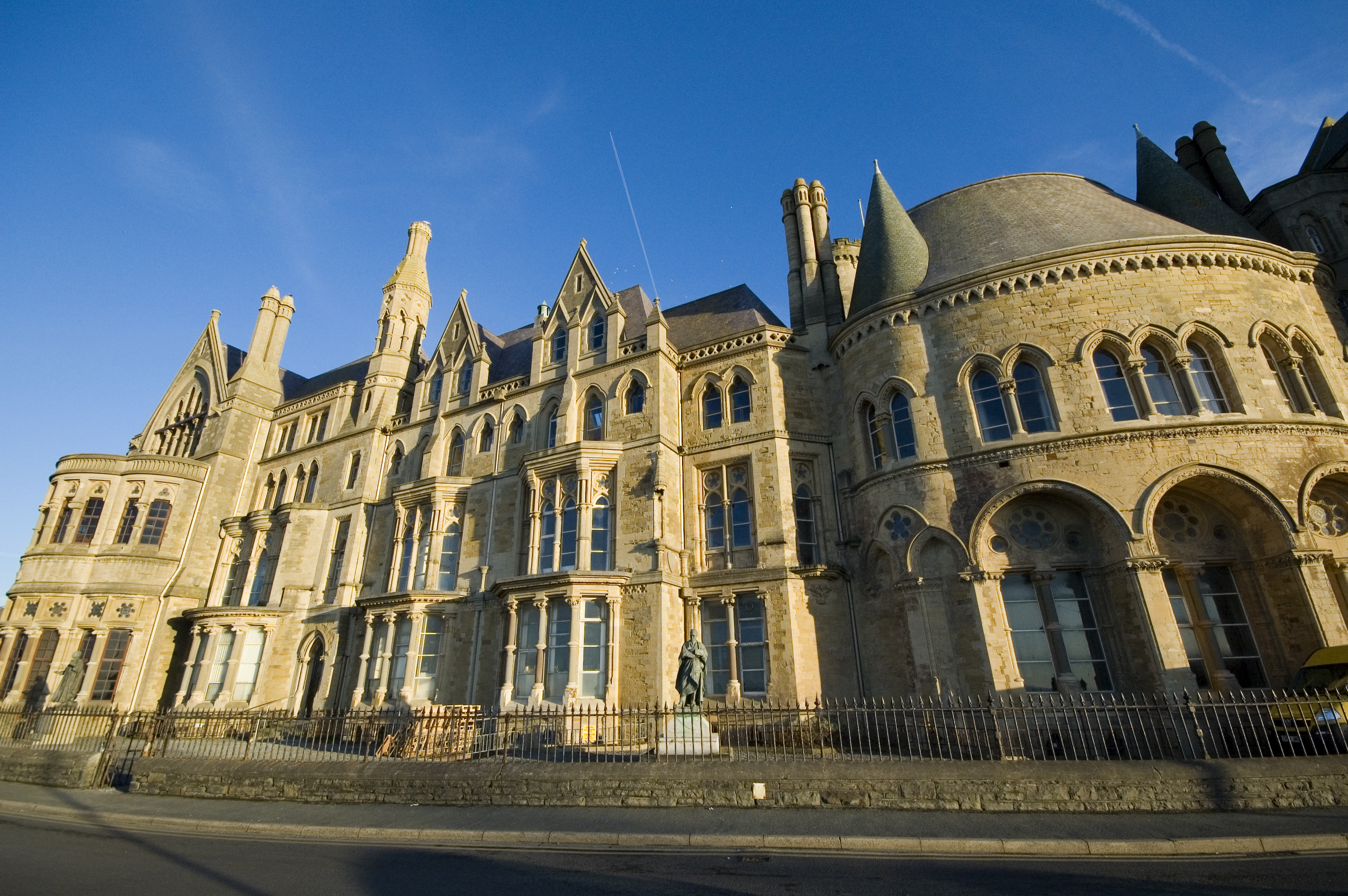
- From the top, View of Aberystwyth from Constitution Hill, Millennium Clock Tower, The Old College

- Location within Ceredigion
- Population: 14,640 (2021)
- OS grid reference: SN585815
  - Cardiff: 90 mi (140 km)SE
- Principal area: Ceredigion
- Preserved county: Dyfed
- Country: Wales
- Sovereign state: United Kingdom
- Post town: ABERYSTWYTH
- Postcode district: SY23
- Dialling code: 01970
- Police: Dyfed-Powys
- Fire: Mid and West Wales
- Ambulance: Welsh
- UK Parliament: Ceredigion Preseli
- Senedd Cymru – Welsh Parliament: Ceredigion Penfro
- Website: Aberystwyth.gov.uk
- List of places UK Wales Ceredigion 52°24′52″N 4°4′54″W Community map: Map of the community

Map of locations in Aberystwyth

Aberystwyth (/ˌæbəˈrɪstwɪθ/; Welsh: [abɛˈrəstʊɨθ]) is a university and seaside town and a community in Ceredigion, Wales. It is the largest town in Ceredigion and 16 miles (26 km) from Aberaeron, the county's other administrative centre. In 2021, the population of the town was 14,640.

Located in the historic county of Cardiganshire, Aberystwyth means "the mouth of the Ystwyth". It has been a major educational location in Wales since the establishment of University College Wales, now Aberystwyth University, in 1872.

In 2025, Aberystwyth became a UNESCO City of Literature becoming the first Welsh place and sixth in the United Kingdom to receive the title and joining more than 50 other cities across the planet.

The town is situated on Cardigan Bay on the west coast of Wales, near the confluence of the River Ystwyth and Afon Rheidol. Following the reconstruction of the harbour, the Ystwyth skirts the town. The Rheidol passes through the town. The seafront, with a pier, stretches from Constitution Hill at the north end of the Promenade to the harbour at the south. The beach is divided by the castle. The town is divided into five areas: Aberystwyth Town, Llanbadarn Fawr, Waunfawr Trefechan and Penparcau.

== Main features ==
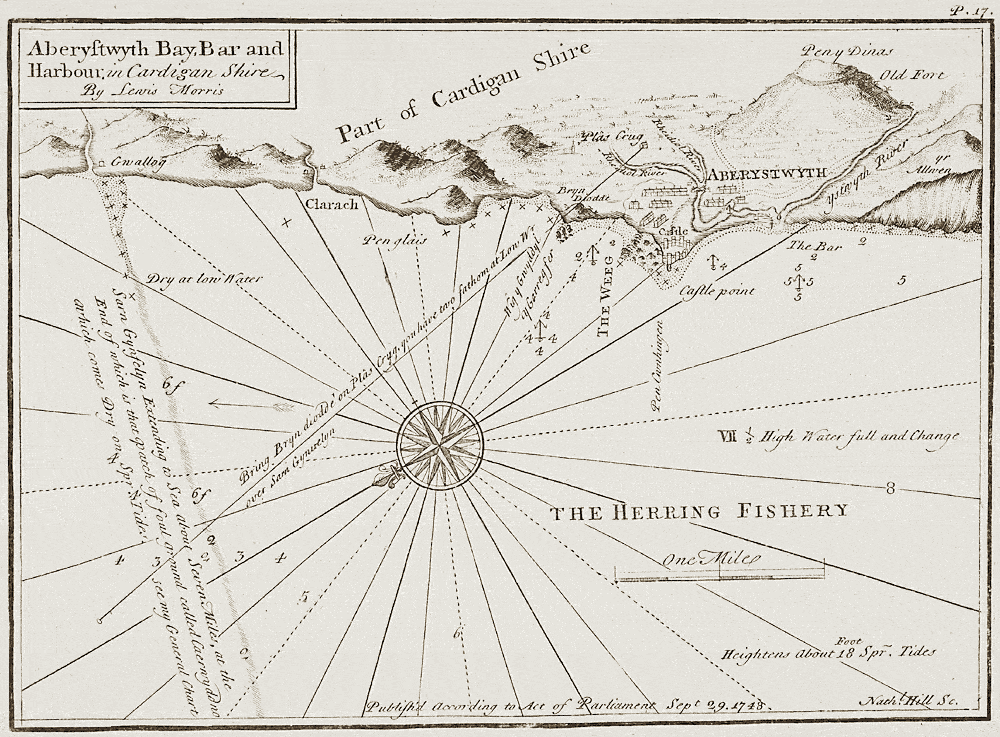
Aberystwyth Bay from a 1748 survey by Lewis Morris (1701–1765)

Aberystwyth is a university town and tourist destination, forming a cultural link between North Wales and South Wales. Constitution Hill, scaled by the Aberystwyth Cliff Railway, gives access to panoramic views and to other attractions at the summit, including a camera obscura. Scenic Mid Wales landscape within easy reach of the town includes the wilderness of the Cambrian Mountains, whose valleys contain forests and meadows which have changed little in centuries. A convenient way to access the interior is by the preserved narrow-gauge Vale of Rheidol Railway.

Although the town is relatively modern, there are a number of historic buildings, including the remains of the castle and the Old College of Aberystwyth University nearby. The Old College was originally built and opened in 1865 as a hotel, but after the owner's bankruptcy the shell of the building was sold to the university in 1867.

The new university campus overlooks Aberystwyth from Penglais Hill to the east of the town centre. The station, a terminus of the main railway, was built in 1924 in the typical style of the period, mainly in a mix of Gothic, Classical Revival and Victorian architecture.

The town is the unofficial capital of Mid Wales and several institutions have regional or national offices there. Public bodies located in the town include the National Library of Wales, which incorporates the National Screen and Sound Archive of Wales, one of six British regional film archives. The Royal Commission on the Ancient and Historical Monuments of Wales maintains and curates the National Monuments Record of Wales (NMRW), providing the public with information about the built heritage of Wales. Aberystwyth is also the home to the national offices of UCAC and Cymdeithas yr Iaith Gymraeg (Welsh Language Society), and the site of the Institute of Grassland and Environmental Research, the Welsh Books Council and the offices of the standard historical dictionary of Welsh, Geiriadur Prifysgol Cymru. A purpose-built Welsh Government office and an adjoining office of Ceredigion County Council are also located in the town.

At the 2001 census, the population of the town was 15,935. This reduced to 13,040 at the 2011 census. The population was 16,420, which includes neighbouring Llanbadarn Fawr, and the greater Aberystwyth conurbation had a population of 18,749 in 2011.

== History ==
=== Mesolithic ===
There is evidence that during the Mesolithic Age the area of Tan-y-Bwlch at the foot of Pen Dinas (Penparcau) was used as a flint knapping floor for hunter-gatherers making weapons from flint that was deposited as the ice retreated.

=== Bronze and Iron Ages ===
The remains of a Celtic fortress on Pen Dinas (or more correctly 'Dinas Maelor'), a hill in Penparcau overlooking Aberystwyth, indicates that the site was inhabited before 700 BC. On a hill south of the present town, across the River Ystwyth, are the remains of a medieval ringfort believed to be the castle from which Princess Nest was abducted. This rare survival is now on private land and can only be accessed by arrangement.

=== Middle Ages ===
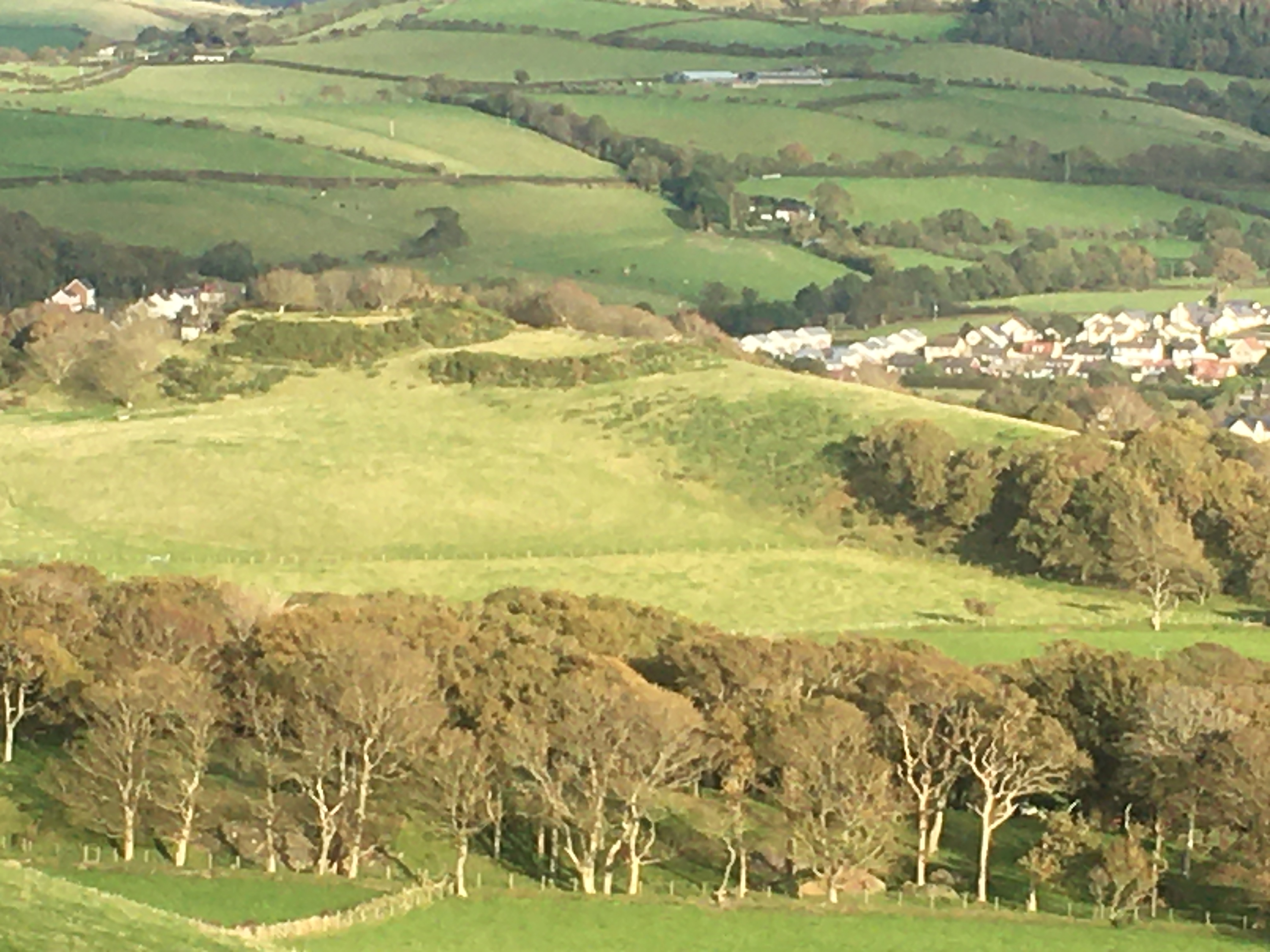
Site of original Aberystwyth Castle at Tan y Castell

The recorded history of Aberystwyth may be said to date from the building of a fortress in 1109 by Gilbert Fitz Richard (grandfather of Richard de Clare, known as Strongbow, the Cambro-Norman lord notable for his leading role in the Norman invasion of Ireland). Gilbert Fitz Richard was granted lands and the lordship of Cardigan by Henry I, including Cardigan Castle. The fortress built in Aberystwyth was located about a mile and a half south of today's town, on a hill over the south bank of the Ystwyth River, thus giving the settlement of Aberystwyth its name. The location is now known as Tan-Y-Castell.

Aberystwyth was usually under the control of the princes of Deheubarth, but its position close to the border with Gwynedd and Powys left it vulnerable to attacks from the leaders of those polities. The town was attacked by Gwenwynwyn ab Owain in 1197, an assault in which Maelgwn ap Rhys was captured. Llywelyn the Great attacked and seized the town in late 1208, building a castle there before withdrawing.

Edward I replaced Strongbow's castle in 1277, after its destruction by the Welsh. His castle was, however, built in a different location, at the current Castle Hill, the high point of the town.

Between the years 1404 and 1408 Aberystwyth Castle was in the hands of Owain Glyndŵr but finally surrendered to Henry, Prince of Wales, the future King Henry V, on 23 September 1408. Shortly after this, the town was incorporated under the title of Ville de Lampadarn (the ancient name of the place being Llanbadarn Gaerog or the fortified Llanbadarn, to distinguish it from Llanbadarn Fawr, the village one mile (1.6 km) inland. It is thus styled in a Royal charter granted by Henry VIII but, by Elizabeth I's time, the town was invariably named Aberystwyth in all documents.

=== Early modern era ===
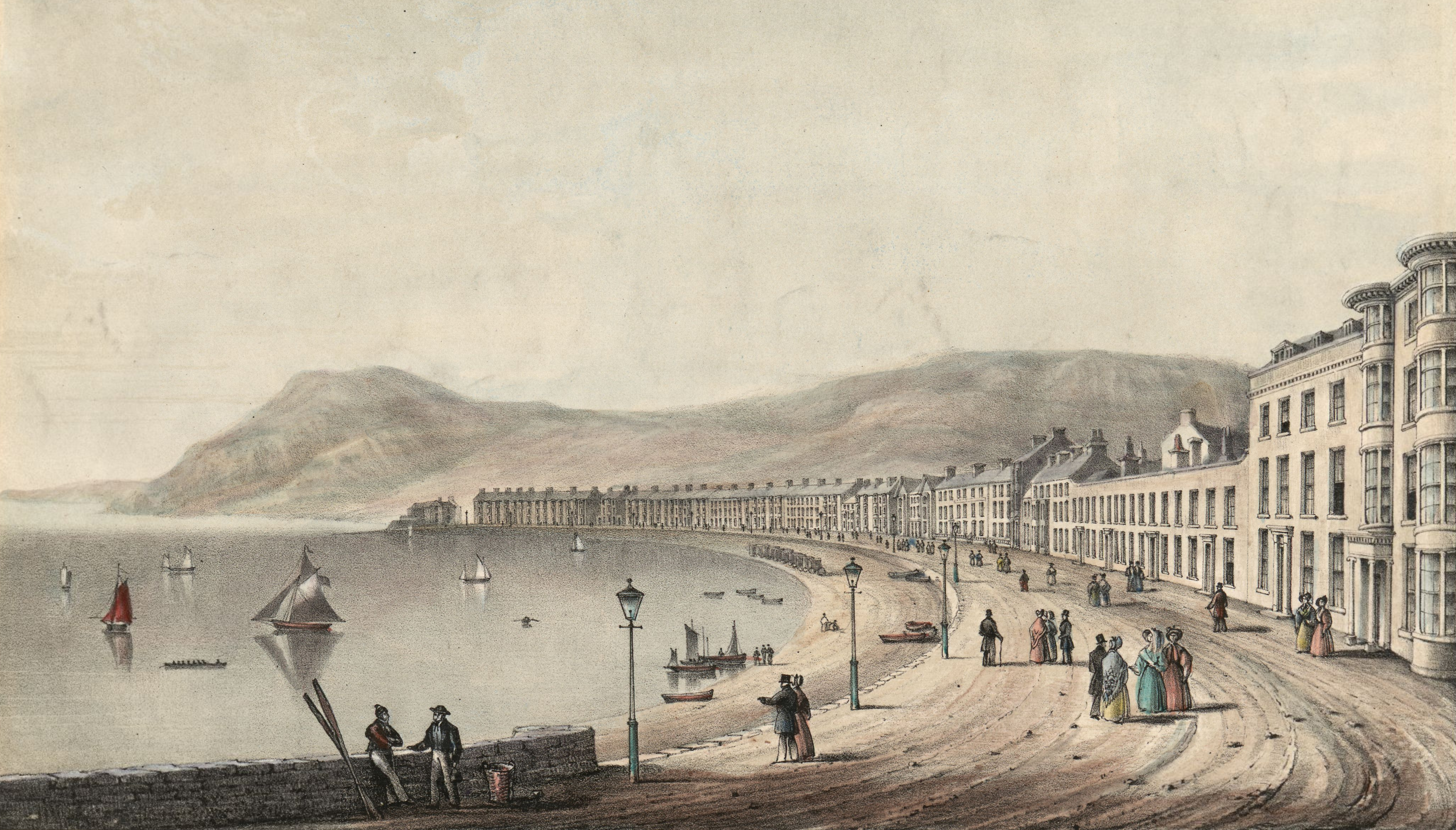
Aberystwyth at around 1840. Crane, W., fl. c.1835–1850, lithographer

From 1639 to 1642, silver coins were minted at Aberystwyth Castle on behalf of the Royal Mint, using silver from local mines. £10,500 in currency was produced, equivalent to 2.5 million silver pennies.

In 1649, Parliamentarian troops razed the castle, although portions of three towers still exist. In 1988, an excavation within the castle area revealed a complete male skeleton, deliberately buried. Though skeletons rarely survive in Wales' acidic soil, this skeleton was probably preserved by the addition of lime from the collapsed building. Affectionately known as "Charlie" and now housed in the Ceredigion Museum in the town, he probably dates from the English Civil War period, and is likely to have died during the Parliamentarian siege. His image is featured in one of nine mosaics created to adorn the castle's walls.

The development of Aberystwyth's Port contributed to the town's economic development during the late 18th and early 19th centuries. Port improvements were carried out in both 1780 and 1836, with a new Customs House constructed in 1828. Rural industries and craftsmen were also an important part of life in this country town. The local trade directory for 1830 shows that there were in Aberystwyth: Twenty boot makers, eight bakers, two corn millers, eleven carpenters and joiners, one cooper, seven tailors, two dressmakers, two straw hat makers, two hat makers, three curriers, four saddlers, two tinsmiths, six maltsters, two skinners, four tanners, eight stonemasons, one brewer, four lime burners, three shipwrights, three wheelwrights, five cabinet makers, one nail maker, one rope maker and one sail maker.

=== Victorian era ===
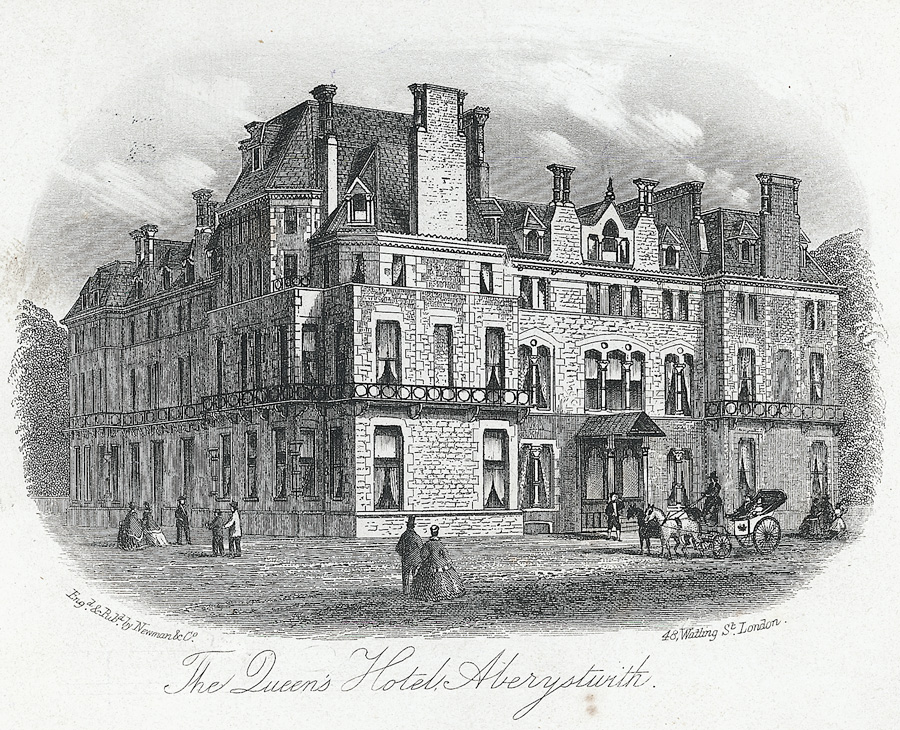
The Queen's Hotel

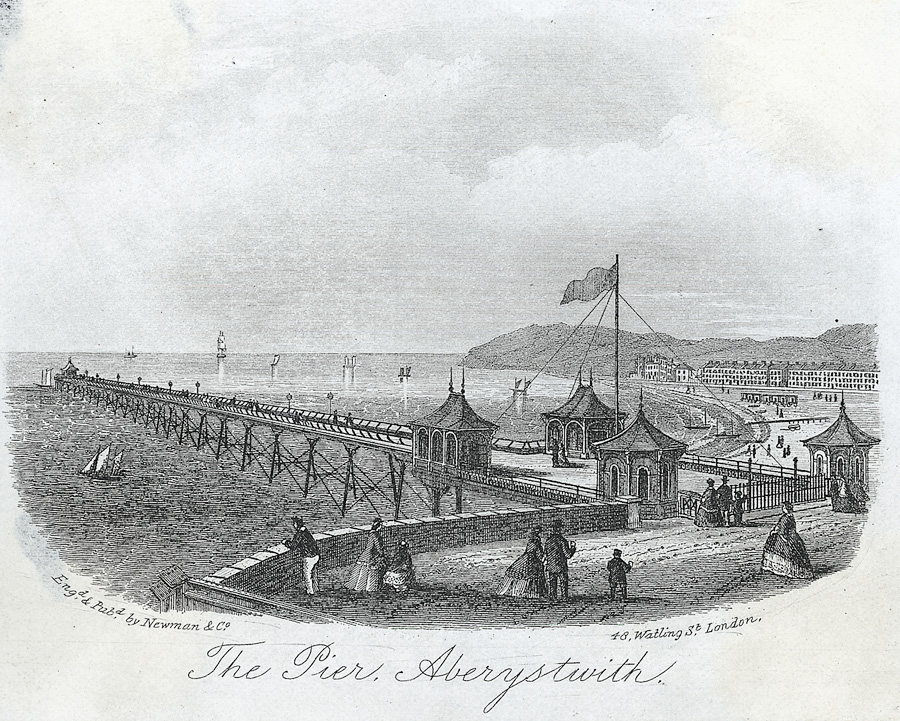
The first pier at Aberystwyth, c.1865

The Cambrian Railways line from Machynlleth reached Aberystwyth in 1864, closely followed by rail links to Carmarthen, which resulted in the construction of the town's impressive station. The Cambrian Line opened on Good Friday 1869, the same day that the new 292 metres (958 ft) Royal Pier, designed by Eugenius Birch, opened, attracting 7,000 visitors.

The railway's arrival gave rise to something of a Victorian tourist boom, with Aberystwyth becoming a significant holiday destination for working and middle-class families from South Wales in particular. The town was once even billed as the "Biarritz of Wales". During this time, a number of hotels and fine townhouses were built including the Queens Hotel, later renamed Swyddfa'r Sir (County Office) when used as offices by the town council, and most recently used as the external scenes of the police station in the television show Hinterland. One of the largest of these hotels, "The Castle Hotel", was never completed as a hotel but, following bankruptcy, was sold cheaply to the Welsh National University Committee, a group of people dedicated to the creation of a Welsh University. The University College of Wales (later to become Aberystwyth University) was founded in 1872 in this building.

Aberystwyth was a contributory parliamentary borough until the Third Reform Act, which merged its representation into that of the county in 1885.

In 1895, various businessmen who had been behind the Aberystwyth New Harbour Company formed the Aberystwyth Improvement Company (AIC) to take over the works of the defunct Bourne Engineering & Electrical. In 1896, the AIC completed three projects: the new landside pavilion for the Royal Pier; built the Cambria Hotel (Note: Later the United Theological College.) and formed Constitution Hill Ltd, to develop a Victorian theme park. Chief engineer George Croydon Marks designed all the AIC developments, including the United Kingdom's second longest funicular railway, which takes passengers up a 50% gradient to a park and camera obscura.

=== 1901 to present ===
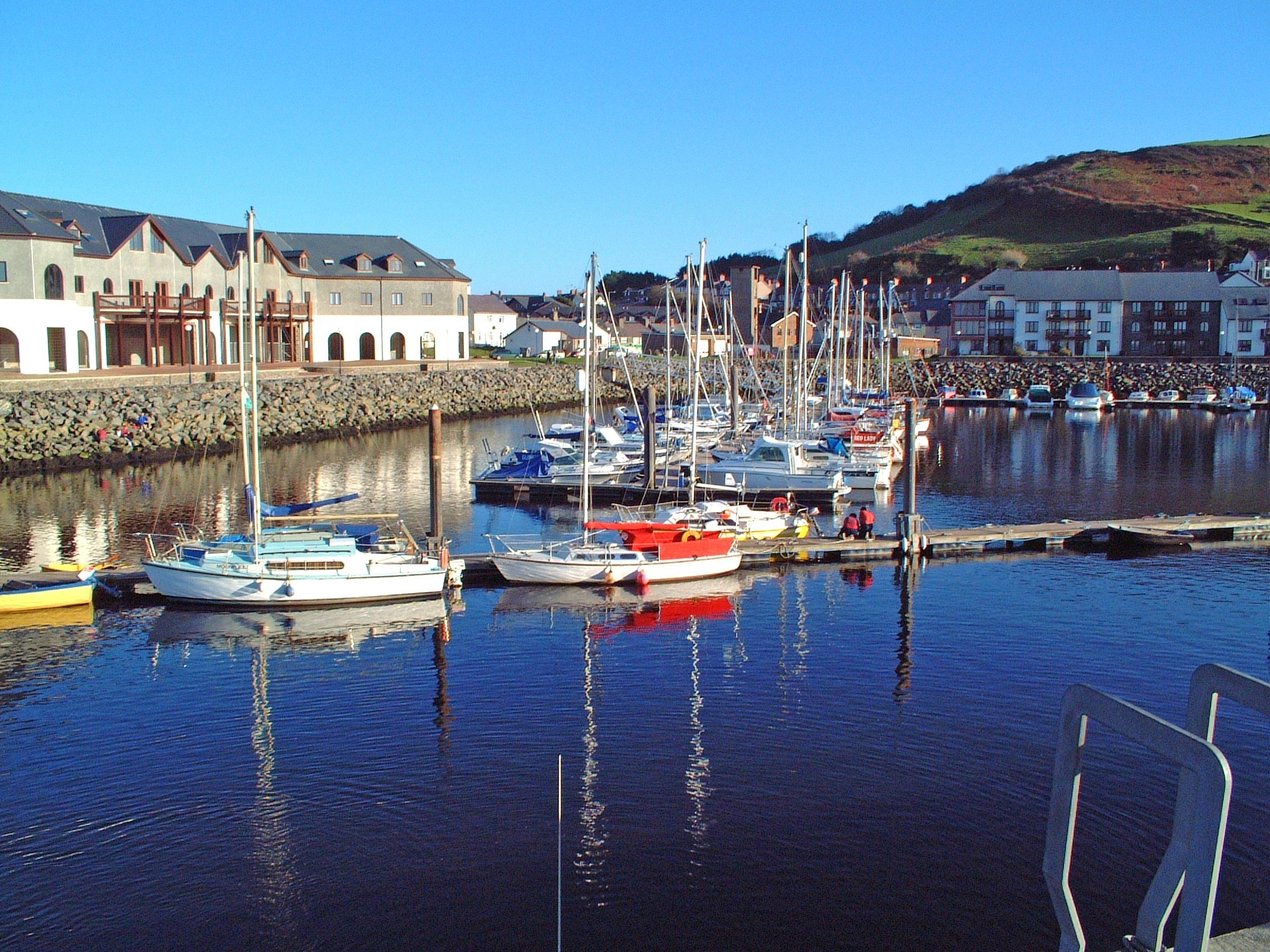
Aberystwyth Harbour

Aberystwyth hosted the National Eisteddfod in 1865, 1916, 1952 and 1992.

On the night of 14 January 1938, a storm with estimated wind speeds of up to 90 mph (140 km/h) struck the town. Most of the promenade was destroyed, along with 200 feet (60 m) of the pier. Many properties on the seafront were damaged, with every property from the King's Hall north affected; those on Victoria Terrace suffered the greatest damage. Work commenced on a protective coffer dam, which continued into 1940, with total costs of construction coming to £70,000. (Note: Equivalent to £2.5 million today.)

Cymdeithas yr Iaith Gymraeg (Welsh Language Society) held their historic first protest on Trefechan Bridge in Aberystwyth, on 2 February 1963. The first independent Welsh Evangelical Church was established in Aberystwyth. (Note: See Evangelical Movement of Wales.)

On 1 March 2005, Aberystwyth was granted Fairtrade Town status.

In March 2009, mayor Sue Jones-Davies, who had played the role of Judith Iscariot in the film Monty Python's Life of Brian (1979), organised a charity screening of the film; principal actors Terry Jones and Michael Palin also attended. There is a popular, but incorrect, urban myth that the town had banned the film, as some authorities did, when it was first released.

The town was one of the worst hit in Wales when Cyclone Dirk passed through on 3 January 2014. Properties on the adjoining promenade were then evacuated for the next five days, including 250 students from the university. Ceredigion Council appealed to the Welsh Assembly Government for funds, whilst Natural Resources Wales undertook surveys and emergency preventative measures.

North Parade was reported to be the most expensive street in Wales in 2018, based on property prices.

In 2025, Aberystwyth was named the first Welsh UNESCO City of Literature, despite not being a city itself, in recognition of it and the wider county's literary and academic history.

== Geography ==
Penglais Nature Park (Welsh: Parc Natur Penglais) is a woodland overlooking the town. The park was created in 1995 from a disused quarry and surrounding woodland that had formerly been part of the Richardes family estate. In spring, a carpet of bluebells bloom, in common with the many other bluebell woods.

The park covers 27 acres (11 ha). It was the first nature reserve to open in Ceredigion and is the only UNESCO Man and Biosphere urban reserve in Wales.

=== Climate ===
Aberystwyth experiences an oceanic climate (Köppen climate classification Cfb) similar to almost all of the United Kingdom. This is particularly pronounced due to its west coast location facing the Irish Sea. Air undergoes little land moderation and so temperatures closely reflect the sea temperature when winds are coming from the predominant onshore (westerly) direction. The nearest Met Office weather station is Gogerddan, 3 miles (4.8 km) to the north-east,and at a similar elevation.

The absolute maximum temperature is 35.8 °C (96.4 °F), set during July 2022. Typically, the warmest day will average 28.0 °C (82.4 °F) and 5.6 days will achieve at least 25.1 °C (77.2 °F).

The absolute minimum temperature is −12.4 °C (9.7 °F), set in December 1981. Typically 38.8 days will register an air frost.

Rainfall averages 1,107 mm (44 in) a year, with over 1mm recorded on 163 days. Averages refer to a mix of the 1981–2010 and 1991-2020 periods.

Climate data for Gogerddan, elevation 31m, 1991–2020, extremes 1959-present
| Month | Jan | Feb | Mar | Apr | May | Jun | Jul | Aug | Sep | Oct | Nov | Dec | Year |
|---|---|---|---|---|---|---|---|---|---|---|---|---|---|
| Record high °C (°F) | 16.1 (61.0) | 20.5 (68.9) | 22.8 (73.0) | 26.2 (79.2) | 30.7 (87.3) | 34.9 (94.8) | 35.8 (96.4) | 35.3 (95.5) | 31.1 (88.0) | 26.1 (79.0) | 21.5 (70.7) | 16.4 (61.5) | 35.8 (96.4) |
| Mean daily maximum °C (°F) | 8.4 (47.1) | 8.7 (47.7) | 10.6 (51.1) | 13.2 (55.8) | 16.1 (61.0) | 18.4 (65.1) | 19.9 (67.8) | 19.6 (67.3) | 17.9 (64.2) | 14.6 (58.3) | 11.2 (52.2) | 8.9 (48.0) | 14.0 (57.1) |
| Mean daily minimum °C (°F) | 2.2 (36.0) | 2.1 (35.8) | 2.9 (37.2) | 4.3 (39.7) | 6.9 (44.4) | 9.6 (49.3) | 11.7 (53.1) | 11.7 (53.1) | 9.5 (49.1) | 7.4 (45.3) | 4.4 (39.9) | 2.5 (36.5) | 6.3 (43.3) |
| Record low °C (°F) | −12.2 (10.0) | −11.1 (12.0) | −9.4 (15.1) | −5.1 (22.8) | −2.6 (27.3) | 0.6 (33.1) | 2.8 (37.0) | 2.8 (37.0) | 0.0 (32.0) | −4.3 (24.3) | −7.4 (18.7) | −12.4 (9.7) | −12.4 (9.7) |
| Average precipitation mm (inches) | 126.2 (4.97) | 98.0 (3.86) | 87.2 (3.43) | 71.6 (2.82) | 70.6 (2.78) | 84.5 (3.33) | 86.3 (3.40) | 93.1 (3.67) | 98.0 (3.86) | 137.7 (5.42) | 140.8 (5.54) | 147.9 (5.82) | 1,241.9 (48.9) |
| Mean monthly sunshine hours | 47.1 | 70.1 | 108.7 | 166.3 | 189.5 | 181.7 | 180.3 | 179.1 | 140.9 | 95.7 | 53.3 | 41.9 | 1,454.6 |
Source 1: Starlings Roost Weather
Source 2: Met Office

== Governance ==
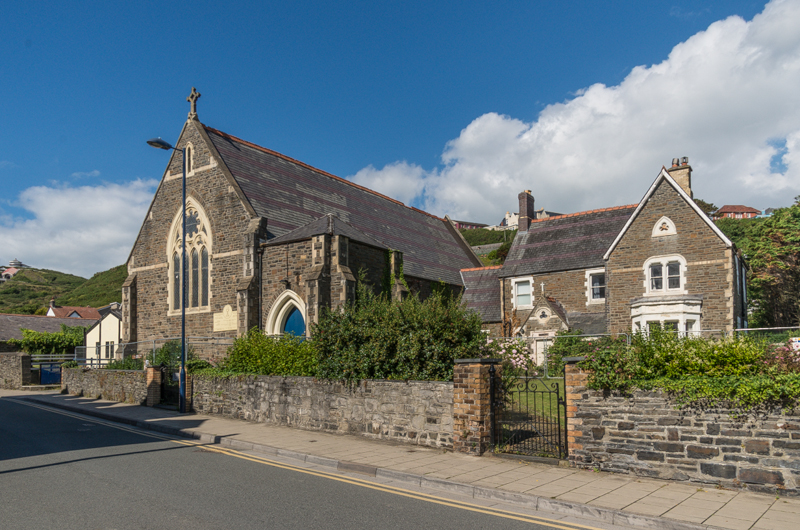
Neuadd Gwenfrewi, Queen's Road: Town council's headquarters (formerly Our Lady of the Angels and St Winefride's Catholic Church)

There are two tiers of local government covering Aberystwyth, at community (town) and county level: Aberystwyth Town Council (Cyngor Tref Aberystwyth) and Ceredigion County Council (Cyngor Sir Ceredigion). The town council is based at Neuadd Gwenfrewi, a converted church on Queen's Road.

Most local government functions are provided by the county council, but the town council has responsibilities for cycle paths, public footpaths, CCTV, public wi-fi, bus shelters, parks, gardens (Note: Including the castle grounds and the skateboard park.) and allotments. The town council is also involved in promoting leisure, tourism and business, contributing to the town's regeneration partnership, Menter Aberystwyth.

=== Welsh Senedd ===
Aberystwyth is part of the six-member Senedd seat Ceredigion Penfro.

=== UK Parliament ===
The town is in the Ceredigion Preseli constituency for elections to the House of Commons. Since June 2017, Aberystwyth's MP has been Plaid Cymru's Ben Lake.

=== Administrative history ===
Aberystwyth historically formed part of the parish of Llanbadarn Fawr. The fortified town was laid out from 1277 onwards, and was administered from then on as a borough. The town was initially called 'Llanbadarn Gaerog' ('fortified Llanbadarn'), with the name Aberystwyth first recorded around 1400. Aberystwyth remained part of the ecclesiastical parish of Llanbadarn Fawr until the late 19th century.

Aberystwyth was reformed to become a municipal borough in 1836, under the Municipal Corporations Act 1835, which standardised how most boroughs operated across the country. The borough council was based at Aberystwyth Town Hall on Queen's Road, which was initially completed in 1851, but was destroyed in a fire in 1957 and rebuilt in 1961.

The borough of Aberystwyth was abolished in 1974 under the Local Government Act 1972. A community called Aberystwyth was created instead, covering the area of the abolished borough. District-level functions passed to Ceredigion District Council, which was in turn replaced in 1996 by Ceredigion County Council.

== Education ==
=== Schools ===
Two comprehensive schools serve the town and a wider rural area:

- Ysgol Gyfun Gymunedol Penweddig, which uses Welsh as the primary language of tuition
- Ysgol Penglais School teaches in English, with Welsh as a subject.

There are currently three primary schools within the town limits: Plascrug, Saint Padarns (Roman Catholic) and Ysgol Gymraeg. Ysgol Gymraeg was the first designated Welsh medium school in Wales, originally established as a private school in 1939 by Sir Ifan ab Owen Edwards as Ysgol Gymraeg yr Urdd.

=== Aberystwyth University ===
Aberystwyth University's (Welsh: Prifysgol Aberystwyth) predecessor, University College Wales, was founded in 1872 and renamed the University of Wales, Aberystwyth in the mid-1990s. Prior to the college's establishment, Wales had very limited academic-degree capability through St David's College, Lampeter, founded in 1822; it is now the University of Wales, Trinity Saint David.

== Economy ==
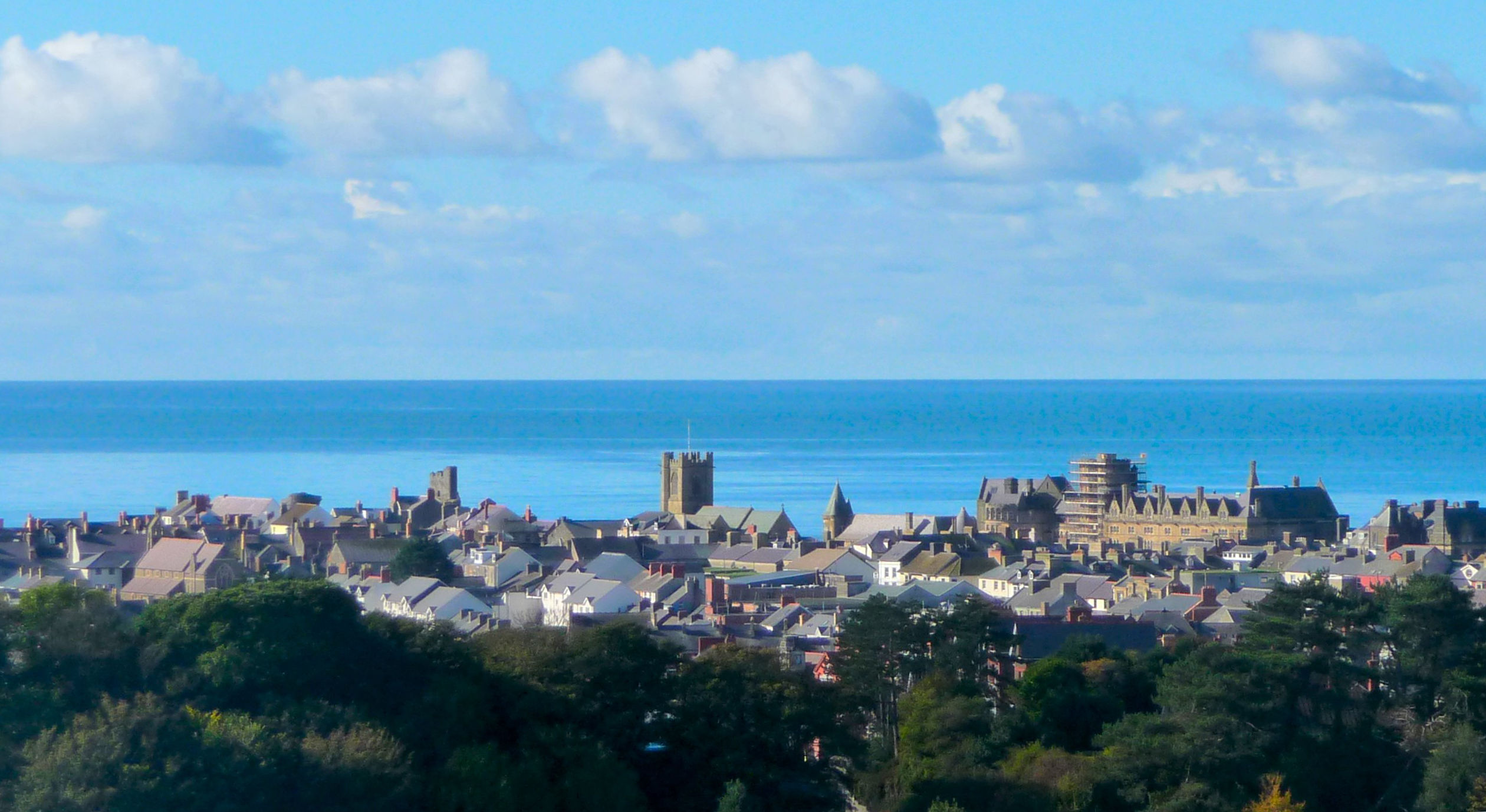
View of Aberystwyth and Cardigan Bay from the National Library of Wales

The all-organic dairy unit of Rachel's Organic is based in Glan yr Afon and is the largest private sector employer in Aberystwyth.

The Cambrian News newspaper came to Aberystwyth from Bala in 1870, after it was purchased by Sir John Gibson. Printed in Oswestry, in May 1880 the paper integrated operations in a former Malthouse in Mill Street. Owned by the Read family from 1926, printing was contracted out in 1993 enabling the move of editorial staff to the current open-plan offices on Llanbadarn Fawr Science Park. On the death of Henry Read, the paper was purchased in 1999 by Sir Ray Tindle, whose company owns more than 200 weekly newspapers in Britain. Now printed in tabloid format, Cambrian News is the second-largest weekly-print circulation newspaper in Wales, with 24,000 copies in six regional editorial versions, read by 60,000 weekly readers. The circulation area of mid, west and north Wales covers 3,000 square miles (7,800 km^{2}).

== Transport ==
=== Railway ===
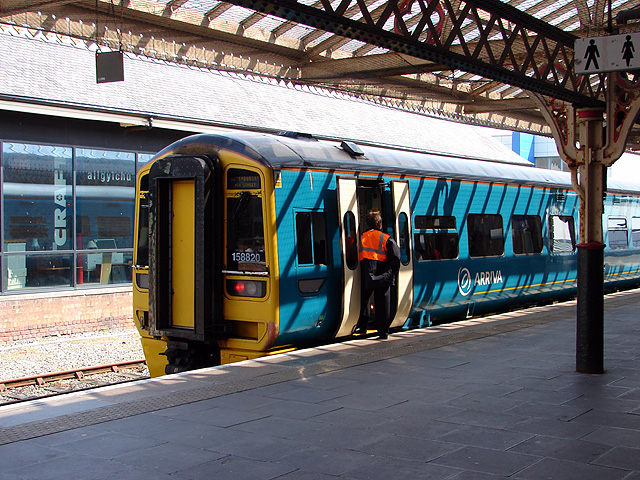
An Arriva Trains Wales service awaiting departure from the station

Aberystwyth railway station is situated in the town centre and is the terminus of the scenic Cambrian Line. Transport for Wales operates a generally hourly service, with some two-hour intervals, to Shrewsbury via Machynlleth and mid-Wales; nearly all trains continue on to Birmingham International. Connecting services from Dovey Junction provide a link to Gwynedd's west coast as far as Pwllheli, along the Cambrian Coast Line.As Aberystwyth railway station has extremely limited parking, Bow Street station acts as a park and ride for Aberystwyth.

There is no longer a southbound connection; the Carmarthen–Aberystwyth line was closed in 1965, as part of the Beeching cuts.

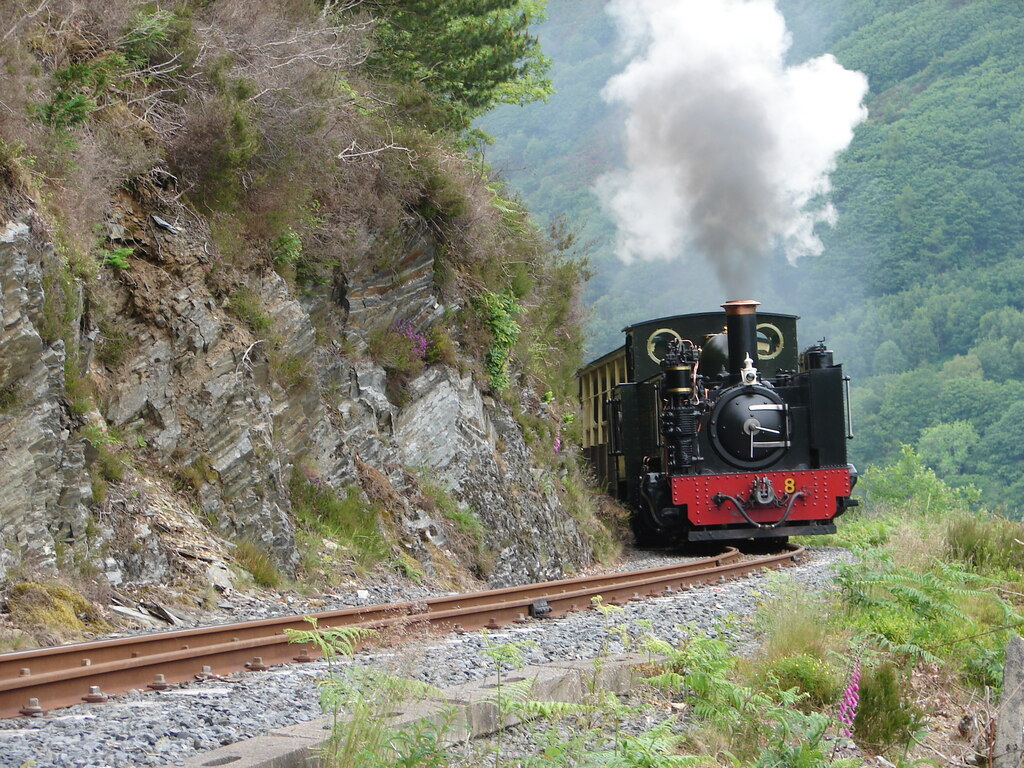
The Vale of Rheidol Railway runs through the spectacular Rheidol Valley

The station is also the terminus of the Vale of Rheidol Railway, a steam-operated narrow gauge heritage railway. Constructed between 1901 and 1902, it was intended to ship mineral cargo, primarily lead, from Devil's Bridge down to Aberystwyth for trans-shipment. By the time it was finished, lead mining was in a deep downturn and, thanks to the Aberystwyth Improvement Company, the railway came to rely largely on the tourist industry, opening for passengers in December 1902. It still remains open for the summer season, with a journey of 12 miles (19 km).

In 1896, the Aberystwyth Improvement Company formed Constitution Hill Ltd which, under the direction of chief engineer George Croydon Marks, developed the United Kingdom's second longest funicular railway, the Aberystwyth Cliff Railway, which takes passengers up a 50% gradient.

=== Buses ===
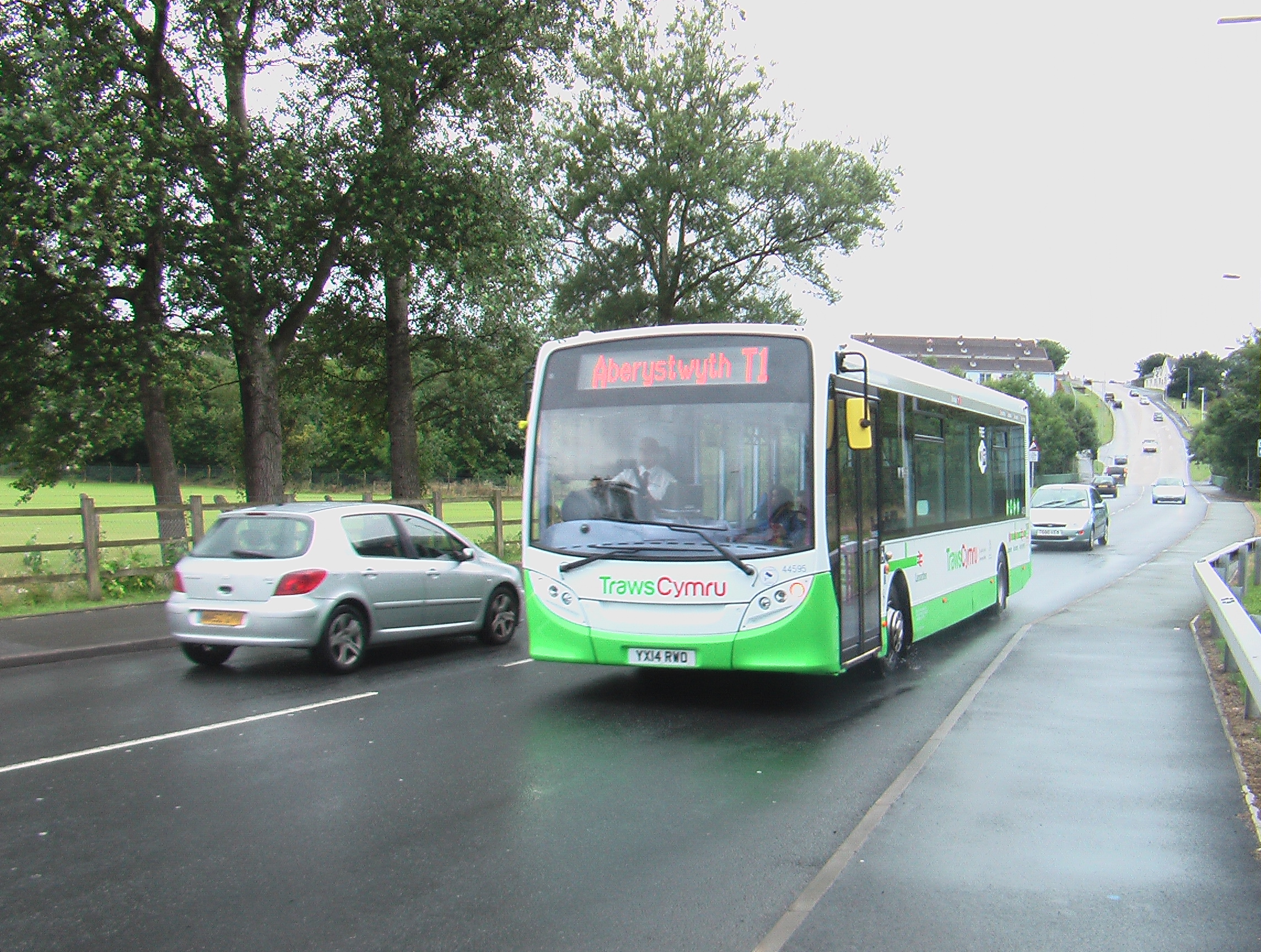
A TrawsCymru T1 service on the A4120

Local bus services are operated predominantly by Mid Wales Travel, Evans Coaches Tregaron and Celtic Travel.Destinations include: Lampeter, Tregaron, Penrhyncoch, Ynyslas and Newtown. Mid Wales Travel also operate town services, the 03 that services the University and National Library and circular services to the suburbs of Waunfawr, Llanbadarn Fawr and Penparcau.

Aberystwyth is also a main hub for the TrawsCymru bus network, with four routes serving the town:

- T1/T1X/T1A - hourly service to Carmarthen, via Aberaeron and Lampeter
- T1C - daily express coach service to Cardiff, via Aberaeron, Llandysul, Carmarthen, Port Talbot Parkway and Sarn
- T28/T2 - hourly to Machynlleth, with two hourly T2 extensions to Bangor, via Dolgellau, Porthmadog, Criccieth and Caernarfon
- T5 - hourly service to Haverfordwest, via Aberaeron, New Quay, Cardigan and Fishguard.

Long-distance coach services

TaithCymru is a new express coach service operated by Edwards Coaches and Llew Jones on behalf of Transport for Wales between Bangor and Carmarthen, only stopping at Caernarfon, Porthmadog, Dolgellau, Machynlleth, Aberystwyth (Bus station and University) and Aberaeron. One late-night return journey extends to Holyhead port.

There is also a daily National Express coach service, the 409, to London via Birmingham.

=== Roads ===
The A44 and A487 meet with much traffic between North Wales and South West Wales passing through the town. The A4120 links the A44 and A487 between Llanbadarn Fawr and Penparcau, allowing through traffic to bypass the town centre.

The B4574 mountain road, linking the town to Rhayader, is described by the AA as one of the ten most scenic drives in the world.

=== Port ===
The port of Aberystwyth, although it is small and relatively inconsequential today, used to be an important Atlantic Ocean entryway. It was used to ship locally, to Ireland and as a transatlantic departure point. Commercially, the once important Cardiganshire lead mines exported from this location.

The importance of maritime trade in the 19th century is reflected in the fact that a lifeboat has been based at Aberystwyth since 1843, when a 27 ft (8.2 m) boat powered by six oars was funded by public subscription and placed under the control of the harbourmaster. The RNLI took over the service in 1861 and established Aberystwyth Lifeboat Station which celebrated 150 years in 2011. The station uses the Atlantic 85-class inshore lifeboat Spirit of Friendship.

== Religion ==
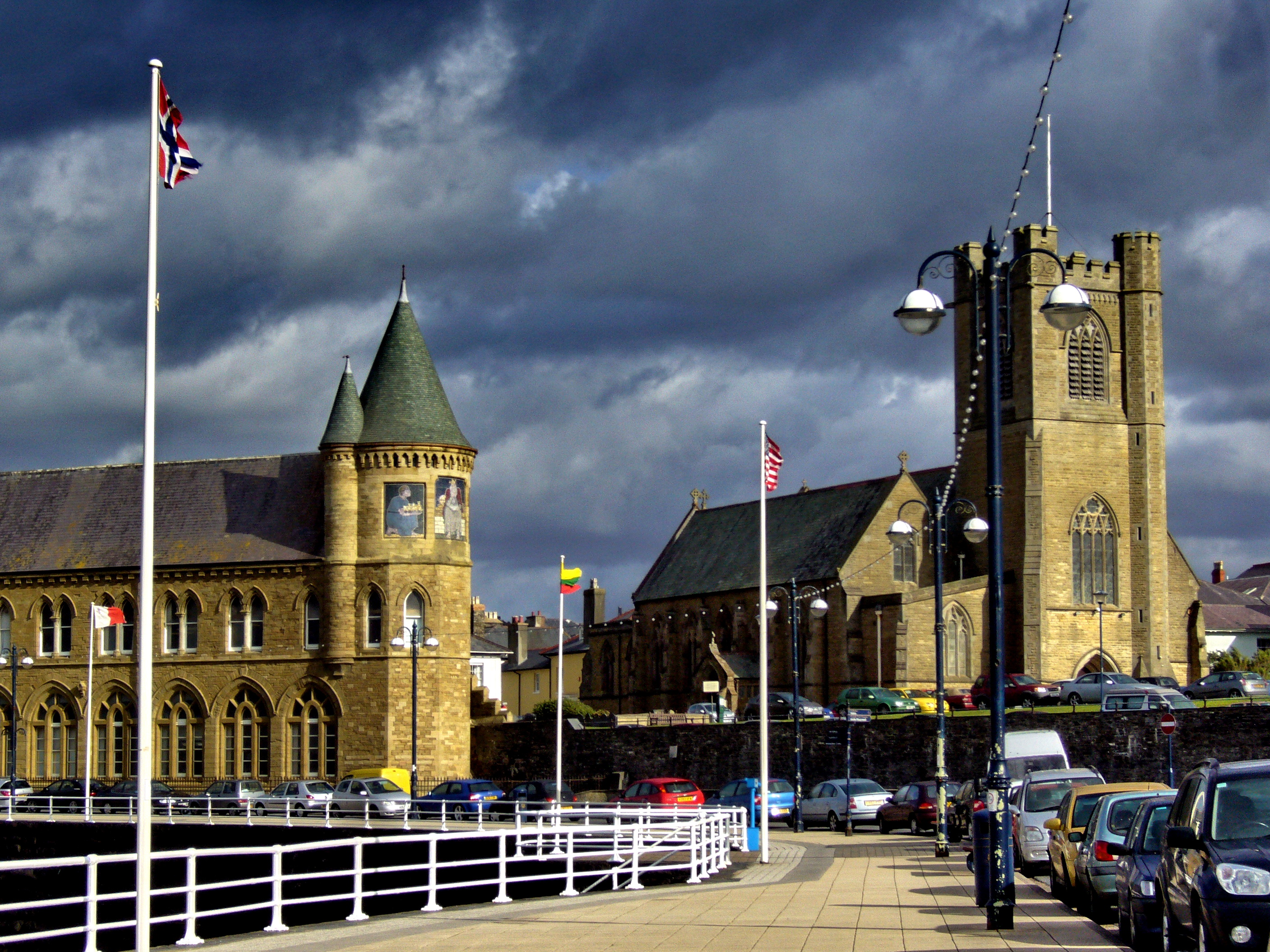
St Michael's, with the Old College to the left

Aberystwyth parish church is St Michael's and All Angels, located in Laura Place. The parish was a Rectoral Benefice until 2019, incorporating the Anglican churches of Holy Trinity, Santes Fair (services in Welsh) and Saint Anne's, Penparcau. The Rectoral Benefice has now been converted to a local ministry area (LMA). The church was built between 1886 and 1890, replacing an earlier church. It was designed in a Gothic Revival style and is a Grade II listed building.

In addition to the Anglican churches, there are many existing and former Welsh Calvinistic Methodist chapels that have these days merged into Saint David's (United Reformed) and Capel y Morfa (Welsh language services). A former Calvinistic Methodist Sunday school house, Ysgoldy Tanycae, is now the meeting place of the Elim Pentecostal church.

There is a Wesleyan Methodist church, Saint Paul's Methodist Centre, located on Queens Road. An Independent Baptist church is located in Alfred Place. In 2021, amid some controversy, Aberystwyth's Catholic church, Saint Winefride's, was closed and the congregation relocated to a new-build church located in Penparcau.

There are a number of other smaller congregations, and many former churches that have now been converted to alternative use, such as the academy bar. Around 1,000 Orthodox Jews, mainly from London and Manchester, travel to Aberystwyth every year for a summer holiday.

== Tourism ==
The town's attractions include:

- The Aberystwyth Cliff Railway, a funicular railway
- A Victorian camera obscura at the top of Constitution Hill.
- The Vale of Rheidol steam railway (Aberystwyth to Devil's Bridge)
- Aberystwyth Arts Centre
- The Parc Penglais nature reserve
- The Ystwyth Trail cycle path
- National Library of Wales
- Park Avenue. Football stadium home to Aberystwyth Town F.C..

Since the TV series Hinterland has been filmed in and around Aberystwyth, the area is being promoted as an opportunity for tourists to visit filming locations; many are well publicised.

== Welsh language ==
Ceredigion is one of the four most Welsh-speaking counties in Wales and remained the majority language until the 2011 census.

Since the town's growth as a seaside resort in the Victorian era, it has been more anglicised than its hinterland and the rest of the county in general. The university has also attracted many English-speaking students from England, non-Welsh speaking parts of Wales and elsewhere. The 1891 census recorded that, of the 6,635 inhabitants who completed the language section, 3,482 (52.5%) were bilingual, 1,751 (26.4%) were Welsh monoglots and 1,402 people (21.1%) were returned as English monoglots. Ceredigion (then named Cardiganshire) as a whole was 95.2% Welsh-speaking and 74.5% monoglot Welsh.

Although the town remained majority Welsh-speaking for many more decades, English had already replaced Welsh in certain domains, such as entertainment and tourism. By 1961, only 50.0% of the town's population could speak Welsh, compared to 79.5% for Cardiganshire as a whole; by 1971, these numbers had fallen to 44.9% and 67.6% respectively. The 2001 census reported that, in the seven wards of Aberystwyth, 39% of the residents self-identified as able to speak or read or write Welsh. This was lower than the figure for Ceredigion as a whole (54%), but higher than that of Wales overall (19%).

== Culture ==
=== Town library ===
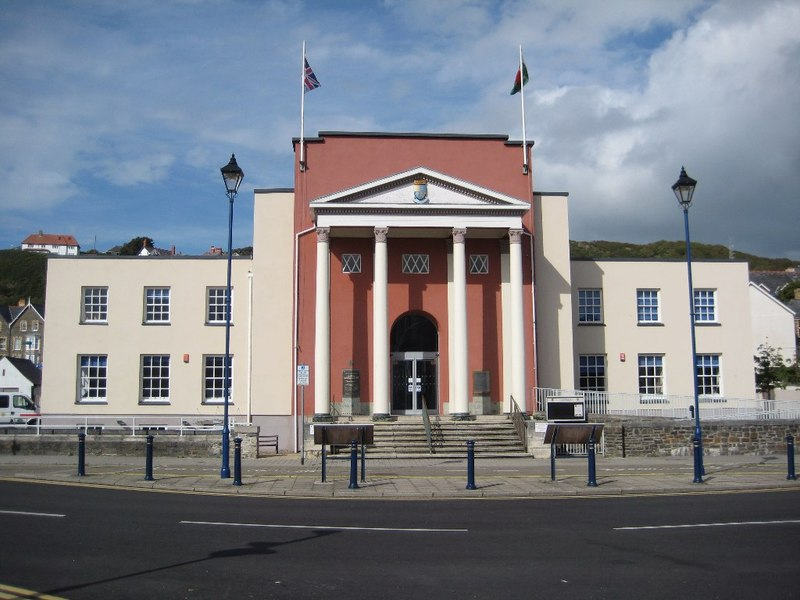
The former Town Hall, now a library

The first public library in Aberystwyth was opened in Compton House, Pier Street, on 13 October 1874. In 1882, the library was moved to the Assembly Rooms which were leased to the council for 21 years. The lease expired in 1903 and the library returned to Pier Street, this time to the Old Banking Library at the corner with Eastgate Street, although this was short lived. A Carnegie library was built in Aberystwyth in 1905, with a grant of £3,000. Located in Corporation Street, it was designed by the architect Walter Payton of Birmingham, who was one of 48 who entered the competition to design the building. It was formally opened on 20 April 1906 by Mrs Vaughan Davies, wife of the local MP. The town library moved to Aberystwyth Town Hall, now named after Canolfan Alun R. Edwards, following the building's refurbishment in 2012.

=== National Library of Wales ===
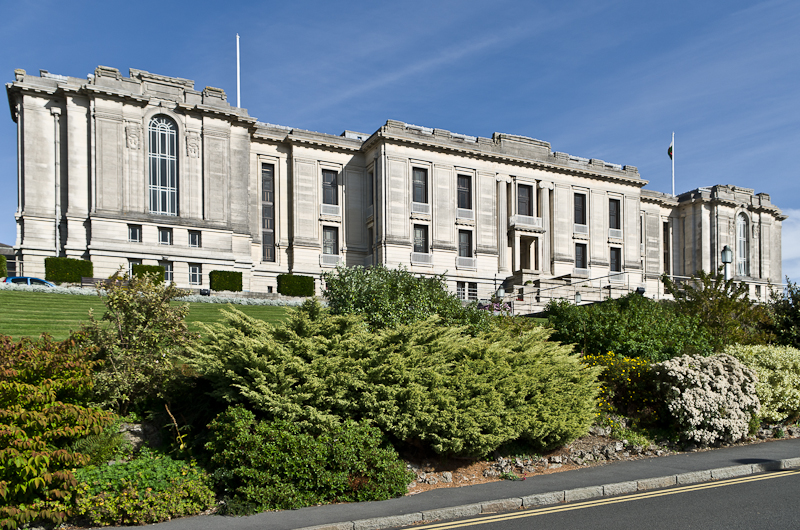
National Library of Wales

The National Library of Wales is the national legal deposit library of Wales. Established in 1907, it is a Welsh Government sponsored body. According to Cyril Evans, the library's centenary events co-ordinator, "The library is considered to be one of the world's greatest libraries, and its international reputation is certainly something that all Welsh men and women are intensely...proud of". Welsh is the main medium of communication within the organisation; it aims to deliver all public services in Welsh and English.

=== City of Literature ===
Aberystwyth (together with Ceredigion) was named as Wales' first UNESCO City of Literature in October 2022, despite not being a 'city'.

=== Arts ===
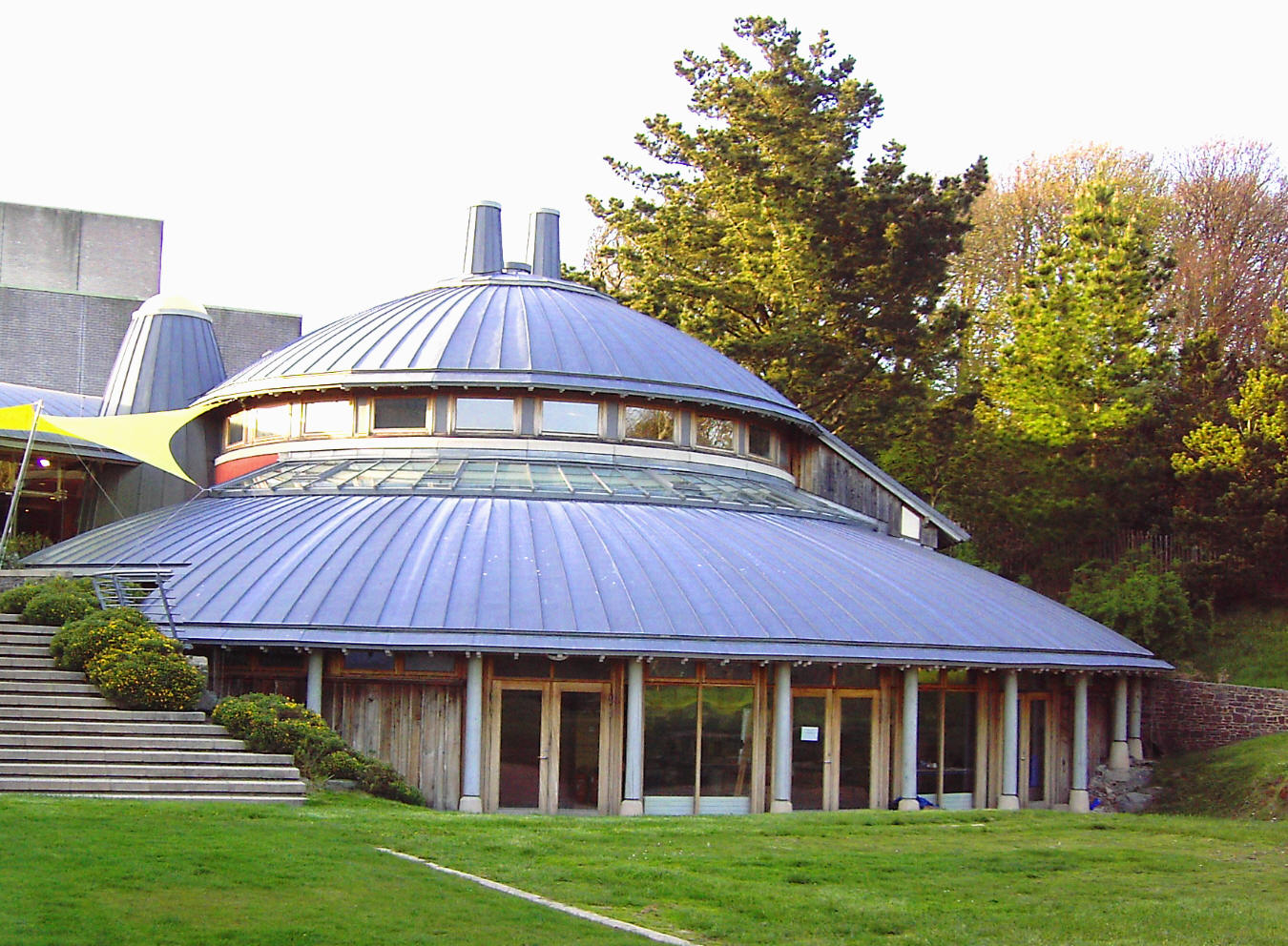
The Arts Centre

Aberystwyth Arts Centre is one of the largest and busiest arts centres in Wales. It encompasses a 312-seat theatre, 900-seat concert hall and 125-seat cinema, with a studio, galleries, cafés and a bar. Arad Goch is an Arts Council-funded theatre company and gallery based in the town; its premises also holds a theatre, art studios, meeting rooms and a darkroom.

=== Public art ===
The town has three works by the Italian sculptor Mario Rutelli; the War Memorial on the promenade, the Tabernacle Chapel Memorial on Powell Street, and the statue of Edward VIII as Prince of Wales in the Old College. All are Grade II listed structures. Rutelli's connection with the town came through Thomas Jenkins of Aberystwyth, who ran a shipping business. Jenkins was a frequent visitor to Italy where he admired Rutelli's work. Jo Darke, in her work, The Monument Guide to England and Wales: A National Portrait in Bronze and Stone, describes Rutelli's war memorial as "striking and rare" and suggests that the life-size statue of Edward VIII is the only recorded example.

The tower of the Old College has a triptych of mosaic murals designed by Charles Vosey.

=== Music ===
Aberystwyth has a live music scene which has produced bands and artists such as The Crocketts, The Hot Puppies, Murry the Hump and The Lowland Hundred. The University Music Centre promotes a varied programme for instrumentalists, singers and listeners from the university and the wider community. The university chamber choir, The Elizabethan Madrigal Singers, have been singing in the town since 1950 and continue to hold a number of concerts throughout the year.

Aberystwyth gives its name to a well known hymn tune composed by Joseph Parry.

== Media ==
BBC Cymru Wales has a studio located on the campus of Aberystwyth University.

Television signals are received from the nearby Blaenplwyf transmitter, which is located about 6.2 miles (10 km) south-west of the town. There is also a low power relay transmitted via the Blaenplwyf transmitter, which is situated in the centre of Aberystwyth.

Local radio stations are provided by Radio Abe and Radio Bronglais, which is a Hospital radio station that broadcasts from the Bronglais Hospital in the town.

The town is served by the regional newspaper, the Cambrian News, which publishes in print and on-line from Aberystwyth.

== Sport ==
Aberystwyth RFC is the local rugby union club and acts as a feeder club to professional side Scarlets. It was formed in 1947 and, for the 2017/18 season, played in the WRU Division One West.

Aberystwyth Town F.C. is a semi-professional football club that was formed in 1884. The team currently competes in the Cymru South, Wales' second division.

The town also has a cricket club, which plays in local leagues, an athletics club (founded 1955), and a boxing club in Penparcau.

The town's golf course opened in 1911.

== In popular culture ==
=== Literature ===
- The Owl Service by Alan Garner, a multi-award-winning classic novel published in 1967, is set in north Wales and has two of its core characters —Gwyn and his mam (mother) Nancy— recently arrived from Aberystwyth for 3 weeks' work, with Nancy repeatedly threatening to return there immediately. They and the Welsh locals refer to it as "Aber"; the English characters use its full name.
- An alternative version of the town is the setting for the Aberystwyth Noir series of detective novels by the author Malcolm Pryce, which also features many of the town's landmarks.
- Stripping Penguins Bare, the book two of Michael Carson's Benson Trilogy of comic novels, is set in the town and university in the 1960s.
- The local writer Niall Griffiths has set many of his novels here and reflects local slang, settings, and even individuals. Grits and Sheepshagger are set wholly in Aberystwyth, which also features prominently in his other novels, such as Kelly and Victor and Stump. He portrays a more gritty side of Aberystwyth.
- Cofiwch Aberystwyth by science fiction writer Val Nolan, is a near-future post-apocalyptic novelette about three young urban explorers visiting Aberystwyth years after a nuclear disaster on the west coast of Wales. It was originally published in Interzone (magazine) and later anthologised in Best of British Science Fiction 2020. The title references the Cofiwch Dryweryn graffiti outside nearby Llanrhystyd, Ceredigion.

=== Television ===
- Y Gwyll (2013–2016), a Welsh-language television programme, and the English-language version Hinterland, broadcast on S4C, BBC One Wales, BBC Four and syndicated around the world, is set in Aberystwyth. It is filmed in and around the town, often in rural locations.

=== Film ===
- Y Llyfrgell (2017) is a Welsh language film set in and around the National Library, which was filmed on location in 2016. The 2009 book on which it was based was released in English in 2022.

== Freedom of the Town ==
The following people and military units have received the Freedom of the Town of Aberystwyth.

=== Individuals ===
- 1912 – Sir John Williams
- 1912 – David Davies
- 1912 – Stuart Rendel
- 1922 – David Lloyd George
- 1923 – Lewis Pugh Evans
- 1923 – Matthew Vaughan-Davies
- 1923 – Sir Herbert Lewis
- 1928 – Stanley Baldwin
- 1936 – Sir David Charles Roberts
- 1936 – Ernest Vaughan
- 1951 – Winston Churchill
- 1956 – Sir David James
- 2011 – Fritz Pratschke
- 2015 – Jean Guezennec

=== Military units ===
- 1955 – The Welsh Guards

== Twinning ==
Aberystwyth is twinned with:

- Arklow, in County Wicklow, Ireland
- Kronberg im Taunus, in Hesse, Germany
- Saint-Brieuc, in Brittany, France
- Esquel, in Patagonia, Argentina
- Yosano, in Kansai, Japan.

== See also ==
- Elysian Grove, an Edwardian outdoor entertainment venue
- Pen Dinas, the Iron Age hill fort overlooking the town.
