= St Paul Methodist Centre, Aberystwyth =

Church in Aberystwyth, Wales

Coordinates: 52°25′03″N 4°04′58″W

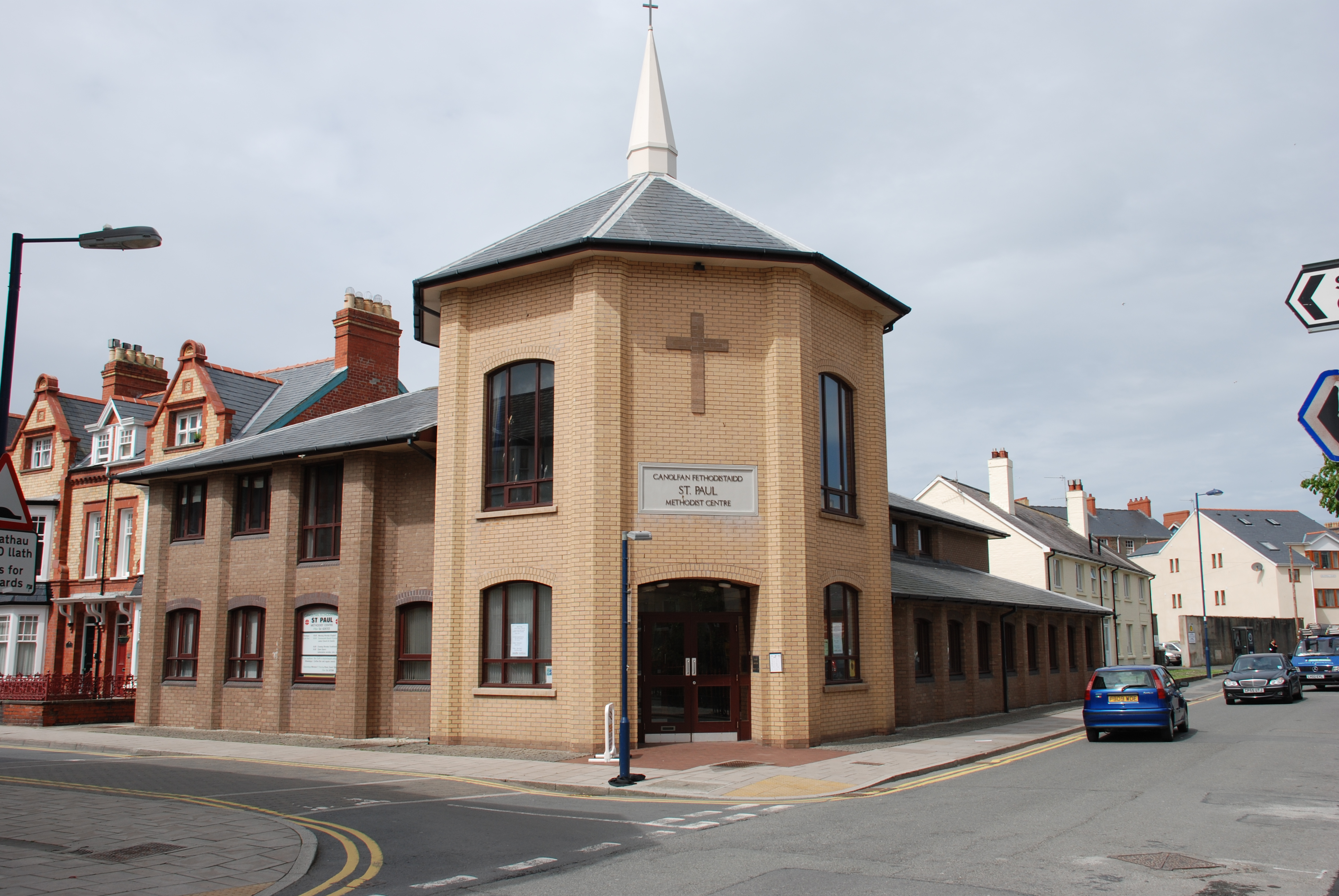
St Paul Methodist Centre

St Paul Methodist Centre is a Methodist church served by the Ceredigion Methodist circuit since 2009. It is located in the centre of Aberystwyth, in Ceredigion, Wales, and serves an English-speaking congregation and a Welsh-speaking congregation. It is the town's newest purpose-built church building.

== History ==
=== 19th century ===
Aberystwyth in the early 19th century was a predominantly Welsh-speaking town. John Wesley's visits to Ceredigion and other parts of Wales in the 18th century did little to establish Methodist societies in the region, as Wesley did not speak Welsh. By the early 19th century, provisions were made for the issuing of Welsh-speaking Methodist preachers to Wales. Edward Jones and William Parry of Llandegai preached in Aberystwyth in 1804 and were later joined by Owen Davies and John Bryan. Jones returned to Aberystwyth in 1805, after which a society was formed in the town. This was the first Wesleyan Methodist society to be formed in Cardiganshire (now Ceredigion). The first chapel to serve the newly-formed society was opened on Queen Street in 1807 and was named Salem. It was later enlarged in 1842.

The presence of the Welsh-language Welsh Wesleyan Methodist society in Wales increased steadily from around 1820. By the 1830s, the Welsh-language Wesle Bach movement had some success in Aberystwyth and a chapel for the Welsh Wesleyan Methodists was subsequently built in the town in 1839.

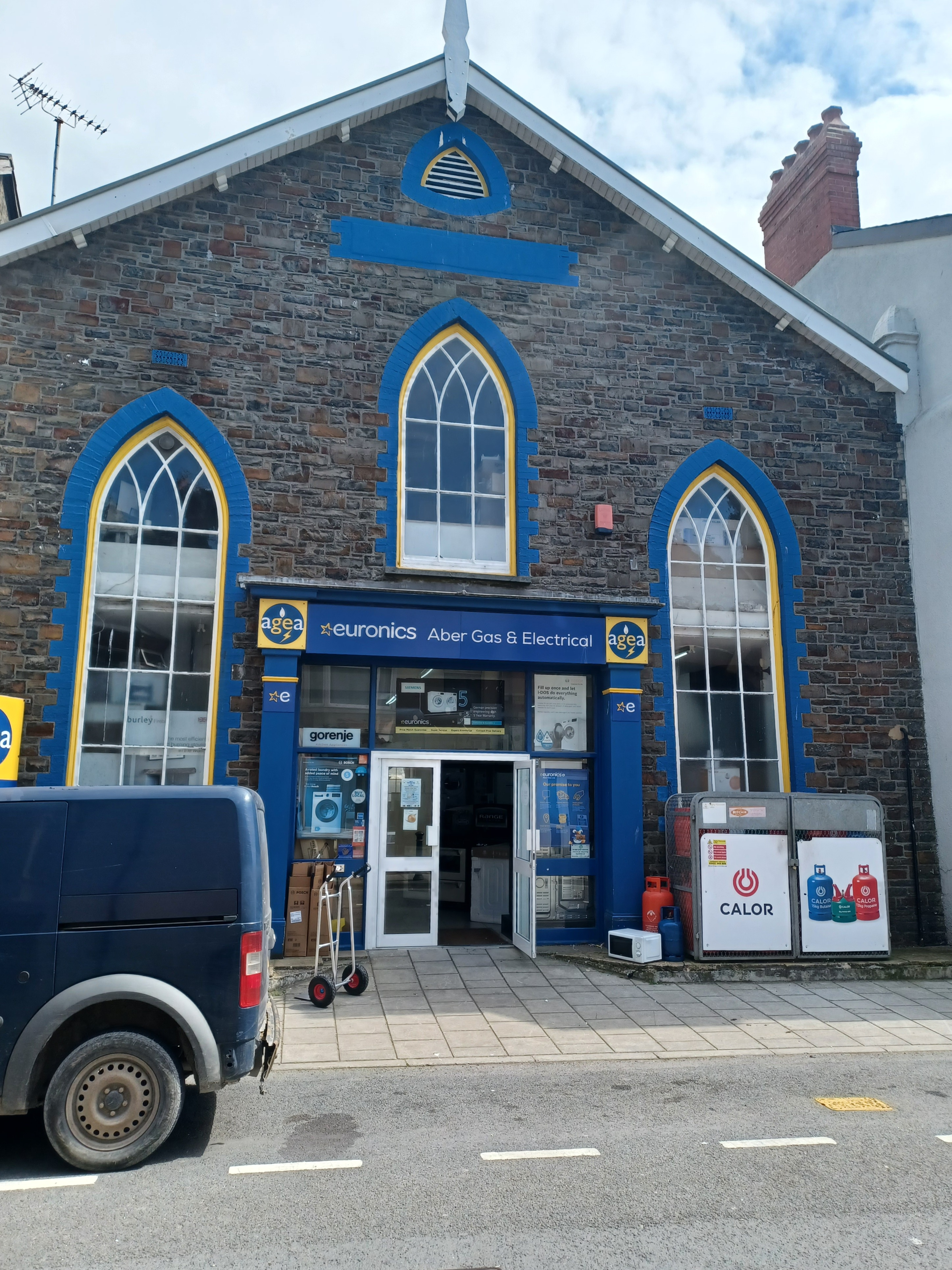
The former Siloam Chapel on Cambrian Street, Aberystwyth

Before long, the Aberystwyth congregation had outgrown the chapel on Queen Street and construction was started on a second chapel, Siloam, which opened in 1869 on Moor Street and operated initially as a branch of Salem. Special sermons were held to commemorate the opening of Siloam on Sunday, 12 December 1869, with two preachers preaching in Siloam and two preachers preaching in Salem, as the new chapel was intended to be an offshoot of Salem, rather than independent of it.

The first Wesleyan Methodist chapel dedicated to St Paul, which would become the spiritual ancestor of the modern St Paul Methodist Centre, was erected in Aberystwyth in 1880, to serve the growing Wesleyan Methodist congregation in the town. It was capable of seating 700 people and was designed by Walter Thomas of Liverpool at a cost of £5900, though the anticipated cost was £2250. The MP for Cardiganshire, David Davies, laid the foundation stone. This building now houses a nightclub called The Academy.

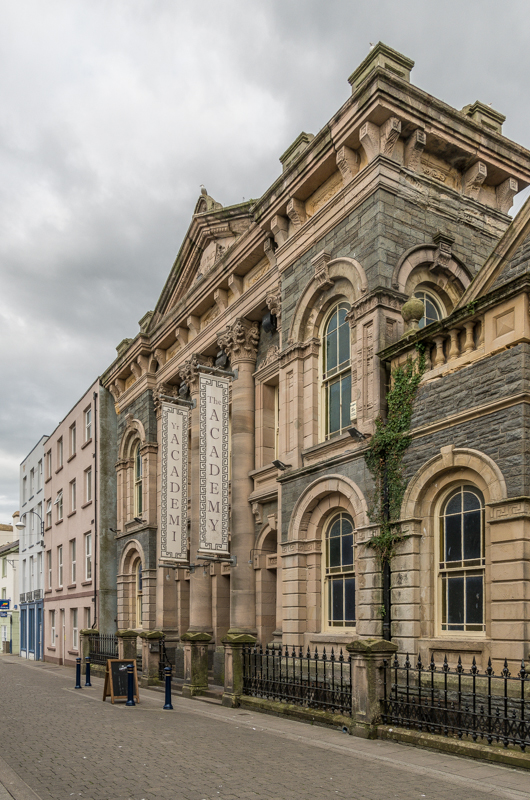
The former St Paul's Wesleyan Methodist chapel on Great Darkgate Street. The building was sold and converted into a nightclub known as The Academy.

The unexpectedly high cost of building the chapel on Great Darkgate Street and the subsequent debts incurred prompted the Rev. William Morgan to hold a fundraising "bazaar" in the hall of University College Aberystwyth (now Aberystwyth University) in order that the debts might be paid. According to The Cambrian News and Merionethshire Standard (now Cambrian News), the bazaar was opened on Monday 5 August 1889 by the Earl of Lisburne, approximately nine years after the chapel was opened to the congregation. A sum of roughly £1000 towards the debt had been raised from proceeds from the bazaar, which ran until the evening of 10 August 1889.

=== 20th century ===
By 1903 work had begun on adding a schoolroom to the chapel on Great Darkgate Street, with the additional building being completed a year later in 1904. The schoolroom was used for a variety of purposes as well as its usual function as a place of education – in 1909 it was used to host a meeting of the St Paul's Welsh Wesleyan Guild, which was reported by the Welsh Gazette and West Wales Advertiser.

St Paul's chapel on Great Darkgate Street had replaced the congregation's previous chapel, Siloam, which itself was a replacement for and extension of the original Salem chapel. Siloam closed in 1954 and the remaining members joined the St Pauls congregation. By 1996 Siloam's building had been converted for retail use.

In 1992 a new centre was built to cater to both the English-speaking and Welsh-speaking congregations under one roof. This building is the present St Paul Methodist Centre and is the most recent purpose-built church to be built in Aberystwyth. In 1994 the Welsh and English congregations were merged to form the Ceredigion Circuit, totalling around 400 members.

=== 21st century ===
in 2009 Welsh-language Methodism was reorganised, and accordingly Welsh-speaking congregations in Wales transferred to the newly-formed Cylchdaith Cymru (Wales Circuit). This process was complete by 2010, after which the Welsh-speaking congregation at St Paul's began to be served by Cylchdaith Cymru, while the English-speaking congregation began to be served by the Ceredigion Circuit, which serves St Paul Methodist Centre in Aberystwyth and St Thomas' Methodist Church in Lampeter.

== Facilities ==
St Paul Methodist Centre hosts a pay-as-you-feel cafe biweekly and has accessible and gender-neutral toilet facilities. It is also a designated Warm Space.
