= Old College, Aberystwyth =

University building in Aberystwyth, Wales

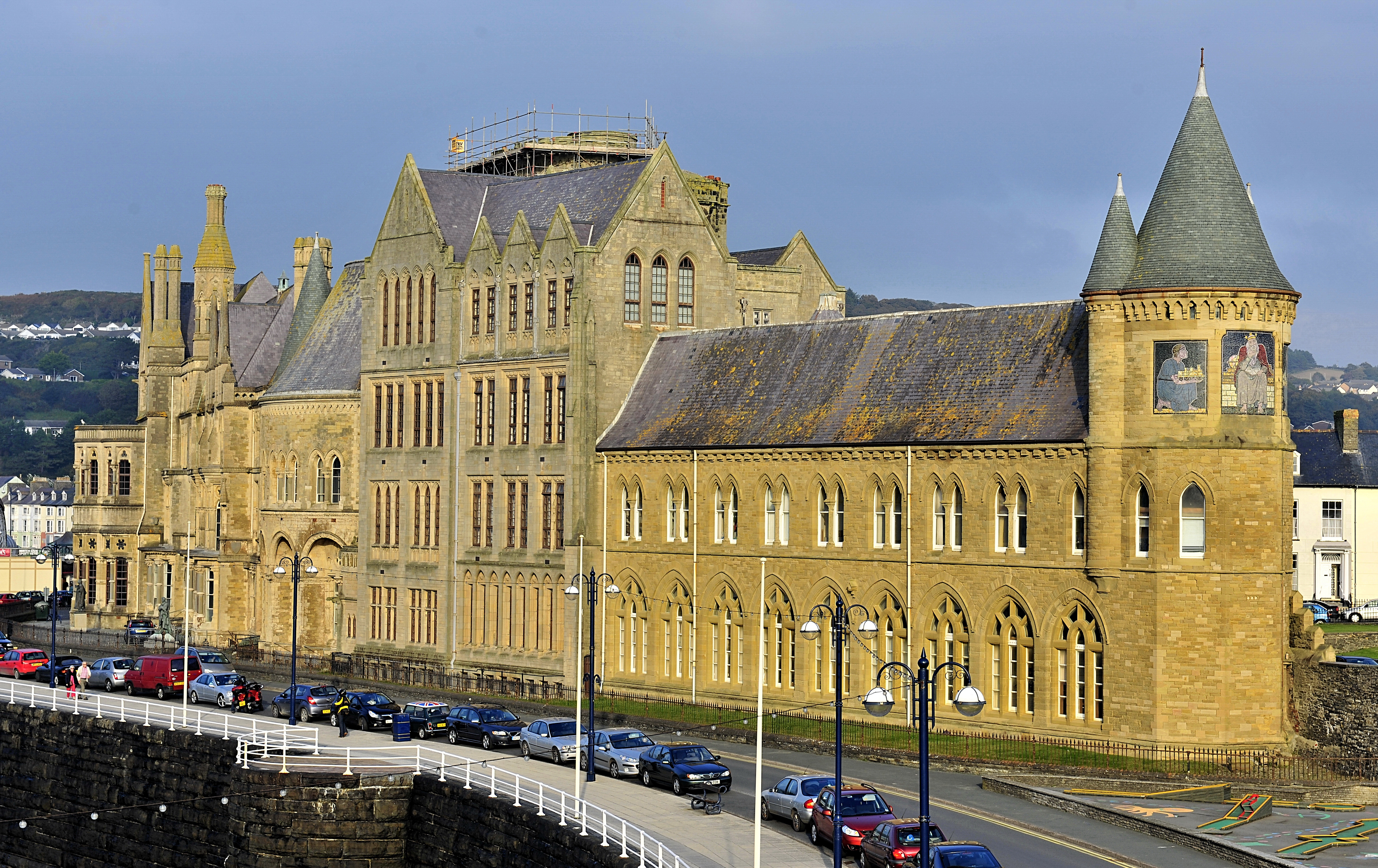
- Old College

General information
- Architectural style: Gothic Revival
- Location: Aberystwyth, United Kingdom
- Coordinates: 52°24′53″N 4°5′18″W
- Construction started: c. 1795
- Completed: 1865

Design and construction
- Architects: John Nash; John Pollard Seddon
- Designations

Listed Building – Grade I
- Official name: University College of Wales Old College Building
- Designated: 21 July 1961
- Reference no.: 10251

Location of Old College and other Aberystwyth Seafront buildings

Old College is a building that forms part of the University of Aberystwyth in Aberystwyth, Ceredigion, Wales. The first building on the site, of which nothing remains, was a villa constructed c. 1795 by John Nash for Sir Uvedale Price. This building was converted into the Castle Hotel in the 1860s by John Pollard Seddon. The hotel was a failure and the building was then sold to University College Wales, Aberystwyth, later a constituent member of the University of Wales. Pollard was retained to redevelop the building as an education institute, and to undertake complete reconstruction after a disastrous fire in 1885. During his tenure, Seddon engaged Charles Voysey to design a mosaic triptych to decorate the building's exterior.

The Old College continued to accommodate teaching departments of the university throughout the 20th century, but was progressively turned over to administrative uses as the university developed its Penglais Hill campus overlooking the town. In 2014 the last of the teaching departments moved out, at which point the university began planning, and fundraising, for a redevelopment of the whole Old College site and its transformation into a heritage/cultural and learning centre. As of 2024, completion of the project is planned for 2026.

The Old College is a Grade I listed building.

== History ==
The first building on the Old College site was Castle House, a villa designed in 1795 by John Nash for Uvedale Price. In 1864, the building was purchased by Thomas Savin who intended to convert the building to a hotel. Savin hired John Pollard Seddon to undertake the reconstruction and work progressed at speed, with the Castle Hotel opening in 1865. However Savin soon ran into financial difficulties and was forced to sell the building only two years after opening. The purchaser was University College Wales, Aberystwyth, which intended to convert it to a higher education institute. The college paid £10,000, £70,000 below the amount paid by Savin. In 1893, the University College became a constituent part of the University of Wales. Seddon was retained to undertaken reconfiguration.

In 1885, the building was damaged by fire and only survived through the University's board paying for repairs as public funds were not available. During the renovation, Seddon was re-engaged to lead the project. During Seddon's tenure, he commissioned a former pupil, Charles Voysey, to design the three mosaic murals now located at the top of the tower, although Cadw suggests they were originally intended for another location. The mosaics were controversial; Voysey's original conception included religious imagery which he intended to symbolise "Science tearing down Sacerdotalism". Some of the university staff were enraged, one don suggesting; "the only blot to spoil the picture being the unfortunate mosaic" and Seddon, who had personally paid for it, was obliged to pressure Voysey to amend the design. Before work on the building was completed, Seddon was dismissed, as the university became concerned at the scale and cost of his plans. Further work on the college was undertaken by Charles Ferguson after Seddon's dismissal.

The Old College remained the main campus in Aberystwyth until the 1960s when the majority of teaching was moved to the Penglais campus near the National Library of Wales. Despite this, administration of Aberystwyth University remained at the Old College along with the teaching of Education and Welsh. In 2012, plans were made for the Old College to become a new postgraduate centre as a part of a new cultural quarter in Aberystwyth. In 2014, the transfer of the last teaching departments to the Penglais site allowed the university to consider redevelopment and in 2015 it applied for £19 million of Heritage Lottery Funding to allow for the renovation of the Old College. Plans for the site will see the Old College repurposed as a heritage/cultural learning and knowledge centre, with the intended completion date being 2026. As of February 2026, the renovation has totaled to £53 million.

== Architecture ==
In 1961, the Old College was given Grade I listed status. Cadw's listing record notes it as a "...particularly important example of that style so loved by wealthy Victorian patrons and so imaginatively created by architects of the period".

== Gallery ==
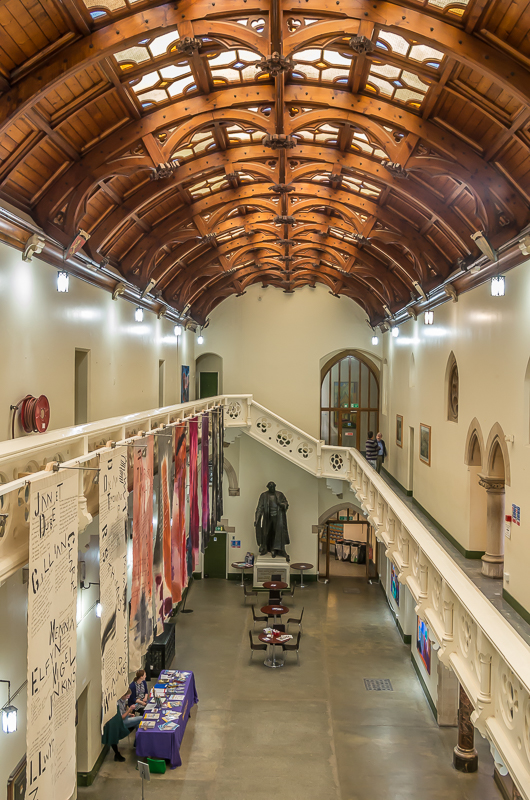
Interior

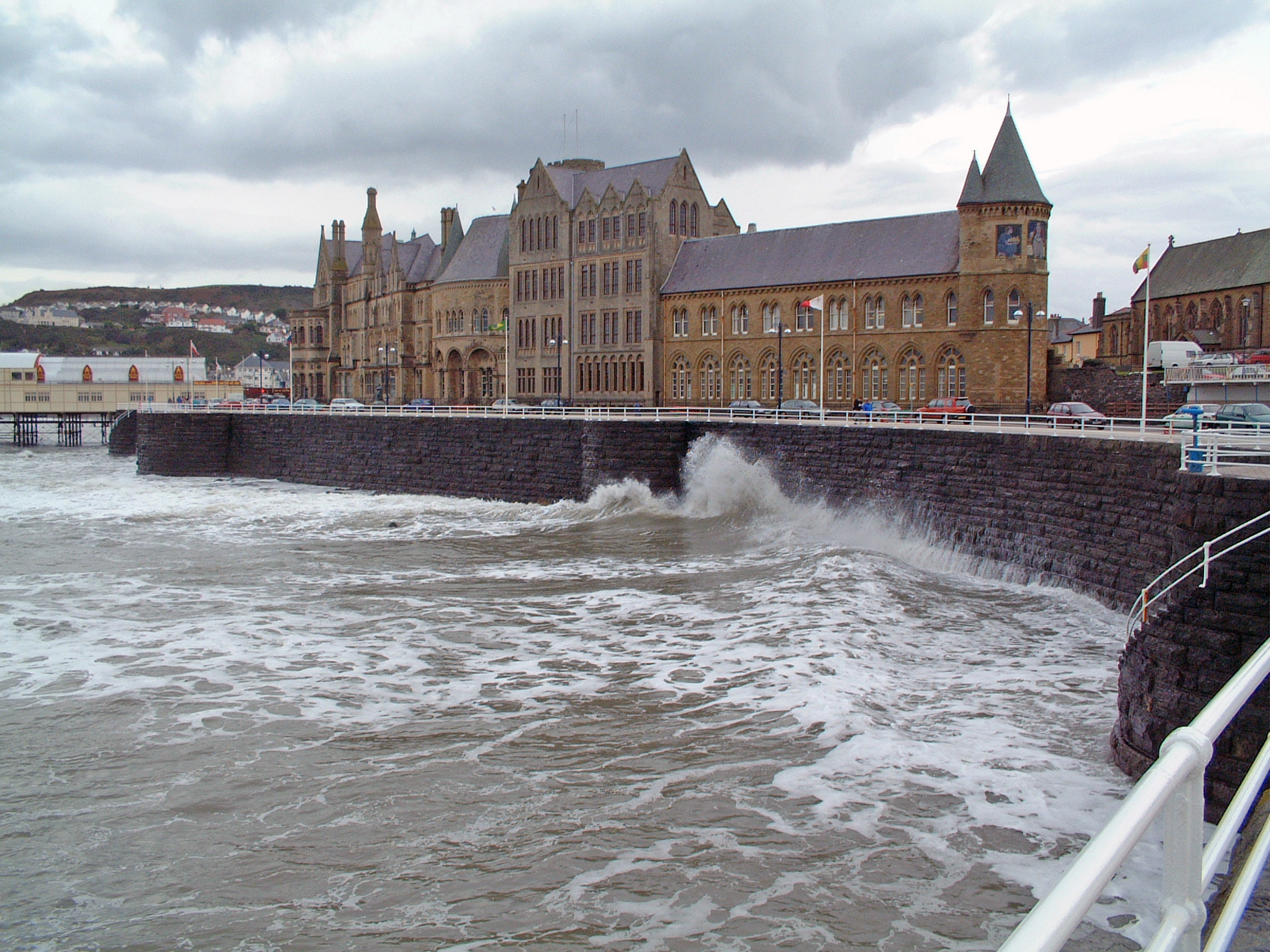
Exterior and Seafront

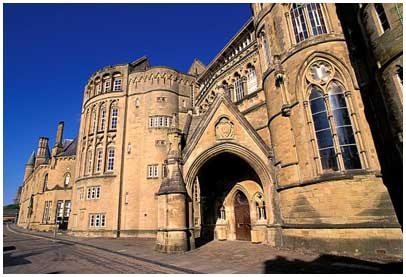
Old College main entrance

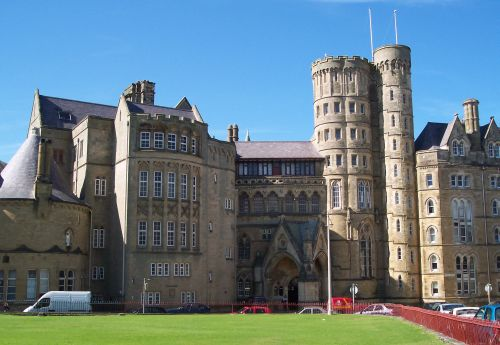
East Entrance

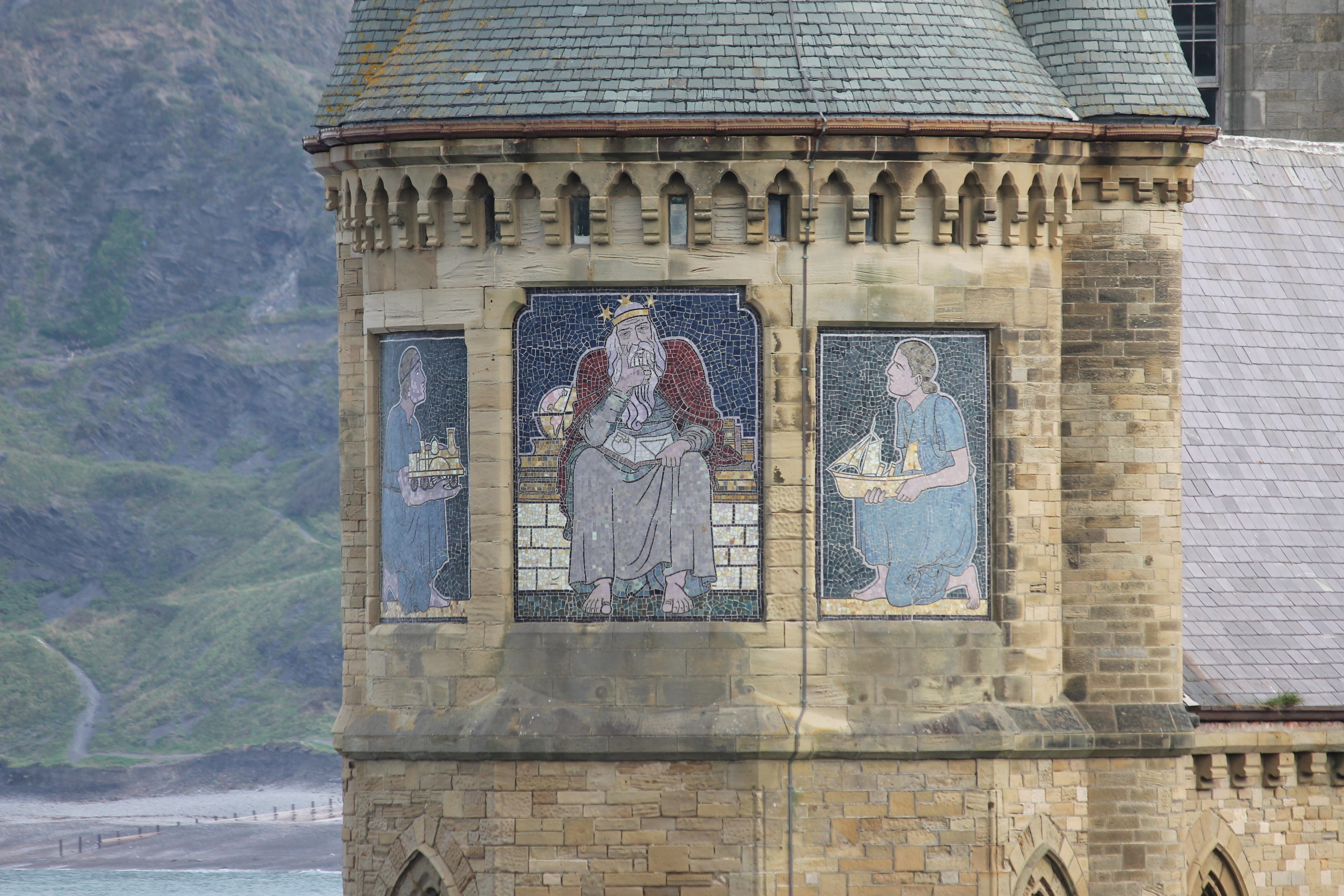
Triptych of mosaics by C. F. A. Voysey
