= Radio Bronglais =

Welsh hospital radio station

Coordinates: 52.417°N 4.071°W

Radio Bronglais FM

Wales
- Broadcast area: Aberystwyth, Mid Wales
- Frequency: 87.8 L-RSL FM

Programming
- Languages: English, Welsh
- Format: Popular Music, Talk

Links
- Website: radiobronglais.cymru

Radio Bronglais is a hospital radio station, transmitting from the grounds of Bronglais Hospital in Wales. It began broadcasting in 1970 and is one of the oldest hospital radio stations in the United Kingdom. Radio Bronglais has been a registered charity since 1983. Radio Bronglais transmits music and live radio shows twenty four hours a day, to the Bronglais Hospital site on a LPFM frequency of 87.8FM. Online streaming, in December 2021, is deployed and is streaming.

== History ==
Radio Bronglais began transmitting in early 1970 when members of Bow Street Youth Club presented a request programme on a Sunday evening between 7pm and 9pm which was distributed to all patients in Bronglais Hospital. Equipment of the time was basic, with disco decks and a small amplifier. An executive committee was set up to raise money to purchase the studio and to provide equipment.

In 1991 and 1999, Radio Bronglais won a British Telecom Award for 'The Best in Wales' and was also runner-up in the same competition in 1996. In September 1998 land became available on Bronglais Hospital's grounds. Radio Bronglais applied to the National Lottery Charity Board of Wales, and in the spring of 1999 were awarded £117,455. During September 2000 building work began on the new studio, which was completed in early February 2001.

2012 saw the station increase its power output after a successful application to Ofcom, and now broadcasts to a wider audience. In 2013 Radio Bronglais went digital with online streaming on its website. In 2013 Radio Bronglais changed its name to RB FM and launched webcams from the studio during live shows.

Radio Bronglais currently plays music and live shows to the Bronglais, Aberystwyth Community 24 hours a day. The station is run by a dedicated committee, volunteer presenters, librarians, administrators, fundraisers and technical staff. Radio Bronglais relies entirely on donations.

In 2014 'The Breakfast Show' was nominated for a National Award for a Programme with multiple presenters, at the HBA Awards. Features include daily give-away competitions, news and weather on the hour, sports, both national and regional throughout the early morning hours. Radio Bronglais also has daily programming, mostly filling the 4PM-8PM "Drivetime" slot.

In November 2013, Radio Bronglais rebranded itself using the new name RBFM. The introduction of the re-branding also saw the introduction of RDS under the name 'RB-87.8'. On 11 April 2014, Radio Bronglais's volunteers completed a 24-hour broadcast, with guests including Walter Coenig and Wincey Willis.

== Notes ==
- Official Radio Bronglais website
