= Kingsley Healthcare =

Kingsley Healthcare is a company based in Lowestoft which runs retirement homes and residential facilities in East Anglia and in north west England.

It employs more than 1,600 staff across 30 establishments with a turnover of £40 million in 2017. Daya Thayan is the chief executive.

== Performance ==
In 2018 its Kirkley Manor nursing home in Lowestoft received an overall good rating from the Care Quality Commission. The Four Oaks Care Home in Partington, was rated ‘inadequate’ and put into special measures. It was reported that there were not enough staff to meet residents' needs. It took over a home at Hadleigh, Suffolk which was closed in 2016 after being put in special measures, and it was rated as good. Sharston House in Knutsford won the care home of the year title at the company's North West Care Awards.

In November 2022 it announced that it would open up all 28 of its sites to support the national Warm Spaces initiative. Elderly people will be welcome and will be offered unlimited hot drinks alongside soup and a roll if they attend at lunchtime.

== Developments ==
It is building a 39-bedroom nursing home in Great Yarmouth on the site of former hotel, and its fourth home for people with learning disabilities at Upton, Cambridgeshire.

It holds an annual awards ceremony for its staff.

Pets As Therapy provide a visiting service by a therapeutic poodle, Ginger Beer, at one of its homes, where most of the residents are suffering from dementia.
