= Elysian Grove =

Street in Aberystwyth, Ceredigion, Wales

Coordinates: 52°25′01″N 4°04′30″W

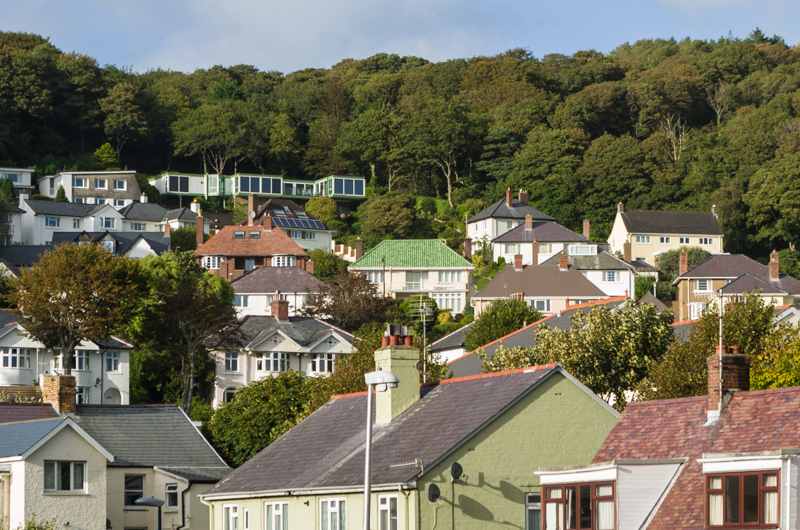
- Houses above Penglais Road, with Elysian Grove leading into Cae Melyn

- Location within Ceredigion
- OS grid reference: SN 5898 8191
  - Cardiff: 74.7 mi (120.2 km)
  - London: 179.2 mi (288.4 km)
- Community: Aberystwyth
- Principal area: Ceredigion
- Country: Wales
- Sovereign state: United Kingdom
- Post town: Aberystwyth
- Police: Dyfed-Powys
- Fire: Mid and West Wales
- Ambulance: Welsh
- UK Parliament: Ceredigion Preseli
- Senedd Cymru – Welsh Parliament: Ceredigion Penfro

Elysian Grove (Welsh: Llwyn Afallon) is a street in the town and community of Aberystwyth, Ceredigion, Wales, which is 74 miles (119 km) from Cardiff.

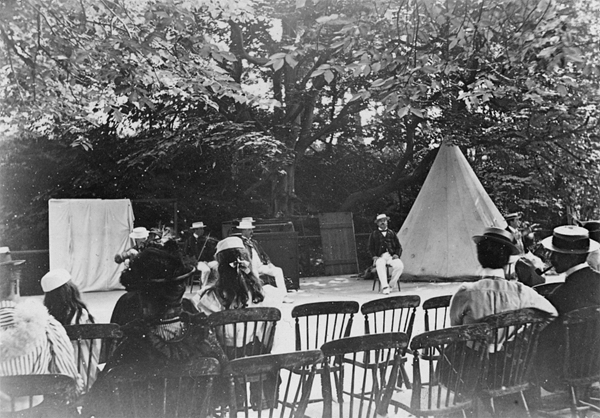
Outdoor concert at Elysian Grove c. 1900–1905

The area was built up in the 1930s. Prior to this, Elysian Grove, also known as Panglais Dingle, referred to an area on the lower slopes of Panglais Hill. It was well known as an entertainment venue, with an open-air stage during the summer, mainly offering concerts and pierrot. There was also a pay-for-entry playground and woodland walks run by the Penglais Estate. Live outdoor entertainment began on the site in the late 1890s and continued until 1926. A contract for a 1,000-seat pavilion was tendered in 1908. and built by 1910. The remains of the stage, located slightly uphill of the start of Dan-Y-Coed, were still visible in the 1970s.

== See also ==
- List of localities in Wales by population
