= Aberystwyth Cliff Railway =

Funicular railway in Ceredigion, Wales

Coordinates: 52.42300°N 4.08379°W

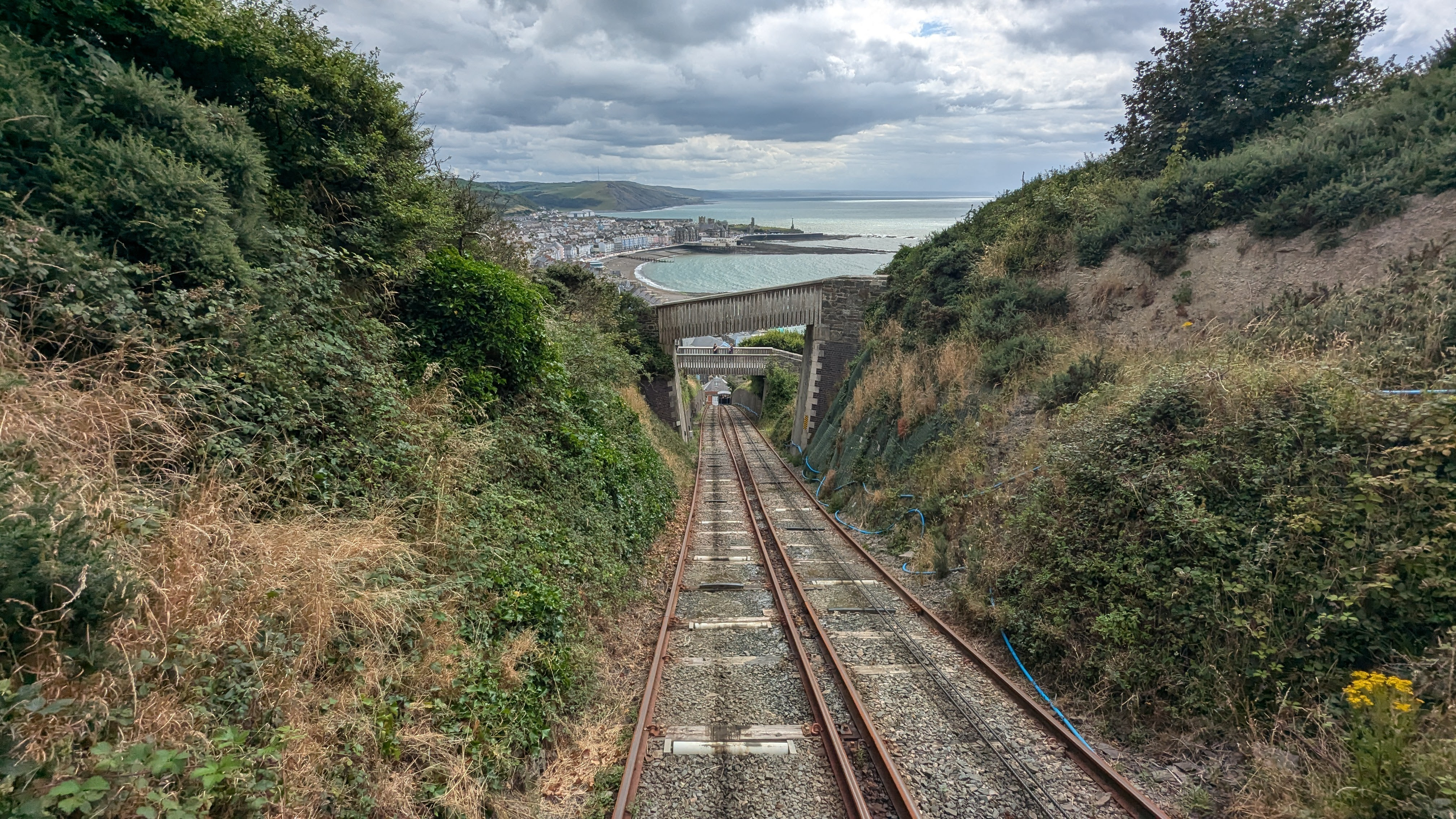

Overview
- Locale: Aberystwyth
- Transit type: Funicular railway
- Number of stations: 2

Operation
- Began operation: 1 August 1896
- Operator: Constitution Hill Ltd

Technical
- System length: 778 feet (237 m)
- Track gauge: 4 ft 10 in (1,473 mm)

The Aberystwyth Cliff Railway (Welsh: Rheilffordd y Graig) opened on 1 August 1896. It is a 778 feet (237 m) long funicular railway in Aberystwyth and is the second longest funicular railway in the British Isles, after the Lynton and Lynmouth Cliff Railway. Since November 1987, the Aberystwyth Cliff Railway has been a Grade II listed structure.

The Cliff Railway was developed as an element of Constitution Hill, a Victorian business venture by the Aberystwyth Improvement Company in the 1890s. The funicular took visitors to the top of the hill, where attractions such as a camera obscura were established. The cliff railway was originally a water balance system, but it was electrified during 1921. Passengers numbers were high during its initial decades, but dropped after the outbreak of the Second World War and stayed depressed for decades. The cliff railway is now owned and run by Constitution Hill Ltd, a registered charity. It is open to passengers during the summer months, typically operating between April and October, with a reduced timetable during the rest of the year.

== Location ==
The Aberystwyth Cliff Railway was part of the Constitution Hill development built by the Aberystwyth Improvement Company, established in 1895. It was an early theme park, consisting of arcades and restaurant at the foot of the hill, and a camera obscura and park at the top. The funicular railway was developed to transport people between the areas. Constitution Hill was designed and engineered by George Croydon Marks who also designed the pavilion for the Aberystwyth Royal Pier, and a meandering footpath as an alternative to the Cliff Railway. Around 12,000 tonnes of rock was excavated for the middle section of the footpath to accommodate a footbridge over the cliff railway. The area is surrounded by the gardens and pleasure grounds of Constitution Hill.

== Design ==
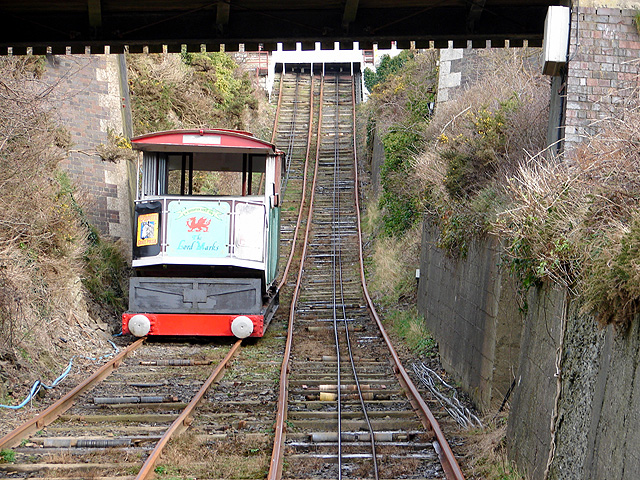
An empty car descending the cliff railway

The cliff railway was originally a cable-drawn balanced system moving a pair of cars, with a maximum capacity of 30 passengers, permanently connected via a continuous cable. When opened, it operated using a water balance system, which used a Worthington Corporation compound steam engine water pump housed in the lower station to move water to the upper station. Each passenger car had a tank in their chassis that could hold 4 tonnes of water. Water was added to the tank of the top car, which descended under gravity, hauling the lighter lower car on the parallel track to the top station.

The railway is straight, ascending about 430 feet (130 m) over a horizontal distance of 778 feet (237 m), a maximum gradient of more than 1:2 (50 per cent). The gauge is 4 ft 8 in (1,422 mm), slightly narrower than standard gauge, and laid on timber sleepers.

In 1921, the railway was electrified using a 41 kW ATB AG Morley DC motor. In 1934, after changes to the town’s electricity supply, a mercury arc rectifier and transformer were installed in the lower station to provide a 440V DC power output. The cars are moved using a high-tensile steel cable attached to both vehicles. It passes around a drum, mounted on a vertical axis between the tracks at the top. The motor drives the drum controlled by an automated cut-off which stops the motor and the cars when required.

Its twin carriages are named Lord Geraint and Lord Marks.

== Operations ==
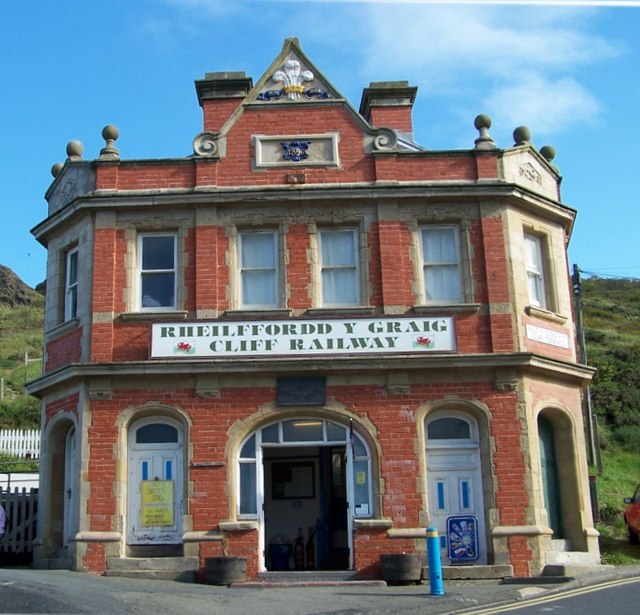
Lower station of the Aberystwyth Cliff Railway

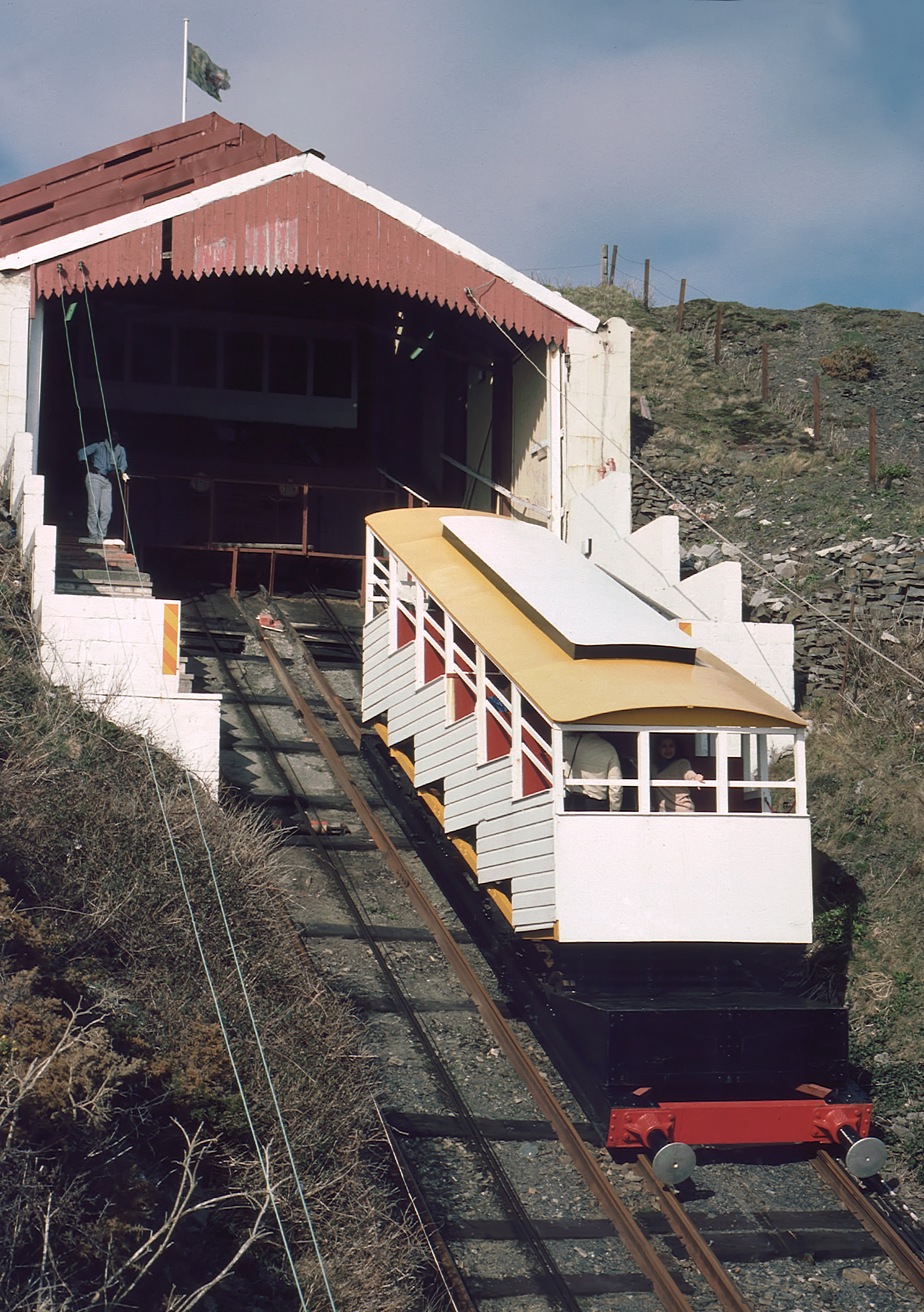
A car near the upper station of the railway, circa 1985

The cliff railway opened to the public in 1896; and was credited with stimulating the development of Constitution Hill as a popular leisure area.

Throughout the 1920s and 1930s, the cliff railway was popular with visitors but during and after the Second World War, passenger numbers declined significantly. In 1948, seeking to revive its fortunes, the Aberystwyth Pier Company bought it and carried out repairs and upgrades. The new owners were unable to increase passenger numbers.

In 1976, the railway was closed briefly on account of a fault in its braking system. During the late 1970s, a local mining company acquired a majority stake and formed the Aberystwyth Cliff Railway Company to operate it. In 1978 a new electrical system was installed which is used to the present day. It takes its power from and returns surplus energy to the National Grid.

In November 1987, the cliff railway was recognised as a Grade II listed structure. In 1998, it was purchased by Constitution Hill Ltd, a registered charity, the trustees are volunteers; all profits generated support the railway's maintenance and restoration activities. The cliff railway has received some external funding, including grants from European Union funds.

The railway is operated under a light railway order. The line is open to passengers during the summer months, typically operating between April and October, while transitioning to a limited timetable during the colder months.

The upper station was refurbished with a café and gift shop during 2005 and roof repairs were made in 2014. Ramps and other adaptations make the service accessible to wheelchair users. The ticket office at the lower station has been converted into a holiday apartment. Of the four original timber bridges constructed to carry hillside paths over the railway, three remain at the northern half of the route for foot traffic.

== In fiction ==
The railway makes appearances in the work of author Malcolm Pryce.

== See also ==
- Funicular railway
- List of funicular railways
