= Michael Carson (author) =

British writer

Michael Carson is the pen name of British author Michael Wherly. He is best known for his Benson trilogy of novels, about a young man growing up Catholic and homosexual.

== Childhood and education ==
Carson was born in 1946 in Wallasey, in the north-west of England. He was brought up as a devout Catholic.

After attending Aberystwyth and Oxford universities, and training at International House World Organisation in London, he spent twenty years teaching English as a Foreign Language primarily in the Arab world. He has lectured in writing at Liverpool John Moores University, the University of Liverpool and the University of Lancaster. He mentors for Crossing Borders, a project to encourage African writers. Carson won the Writers Inc prize in 2006 for his story All over the Place.

He has also worked as a lifeguard.

=== Short stories ===
Carson released a collection of short stories in 1993, Serving Suggestions, published by Victor Gollancz (ISBN 0-552-99586-X), which includes "The Punishment of Luxury". A further collection of short stories, The Rule of Twelfths, was published by Headland in May 2008. Fifty short stories by Michael Carson have also featured on BBC Radio Four.

== Novels ==
=== Benson trilogy ===
- Sucking Sherbet Lemons ISBN 0-552-99348-4
- Stripping Penguins Bare ISBN 0-552-99465-0
- Yanking Up The Yoyo ISBN 0-552-99524-X
- Benson at Sixty (2011) ISBN 978-0-9565445-4-4

=== Other novels ===
- Friends and Infidels ISBN 0-552-99380-8
- Coming Up Roses ISBN 0-552-99421-9
- Demolishing Babel ISBN 0-385-40431-X
- Dying in Style ISBN 1-85371-817-3
- Hubbies ISBN 1-85371-678-2
- The Knight of the Flaming Heart ISBN 0-385-40651-7
- The Rule of Twelfths and Other Stories
