= Warm Spaces =

As a reaction to the 2021–present United Kingdom cost of living crisis a large number of Warm Spaces initiatives were created. They generally look to reduce isolation and loneliness as well as providing physical warmth.

- Ceredigion County Council published a list of spaces with an interactive map which included the National Library of Wales.
- Flint Creative Collective in Norwich set up a website designed to signpost anyone in need of warmth & community, to a warm space to share with others.
- Gedling Borough Council and its community partners produced a list of essential warm spaces across the borough.
- The Good Faith Foundation, a network of 1,200 local churches and over 40 denominations, set up a Warm Welcome Campaign "provide a warm welcome for those struggling to heat their homes this winter. "
- Kingsley Healthcare announced that it would open up all 28 of its sites to support the national Warm Spaces initiative. Elderly people would be welcomed and will be offered unlimited hot drinks alongside soup and a roll if they attend at lunchtime.
- Leeds City Council established a network of Warm Spaces across Leeds including libraries, community centres, and community hubs.
- Sheffield City Council with Voluntary Action Sheffield set up an interactive map of 74 warm spaces across Sheffield, accessible to struggling members of the public.
- South Gloucestershire Council signed up 17 venues to its network but there were complaints that they were “totally insufficient” because they would not be open when they are needed most during evenings or weekends.
- Swindon Borough Council created 10 Warm and Welcome Spaces in Council-run and community venues.
