= Constitution Hill, Aberystwyth =

Hill in Aberystwyth, Wales

Constitution Hill
- Consti
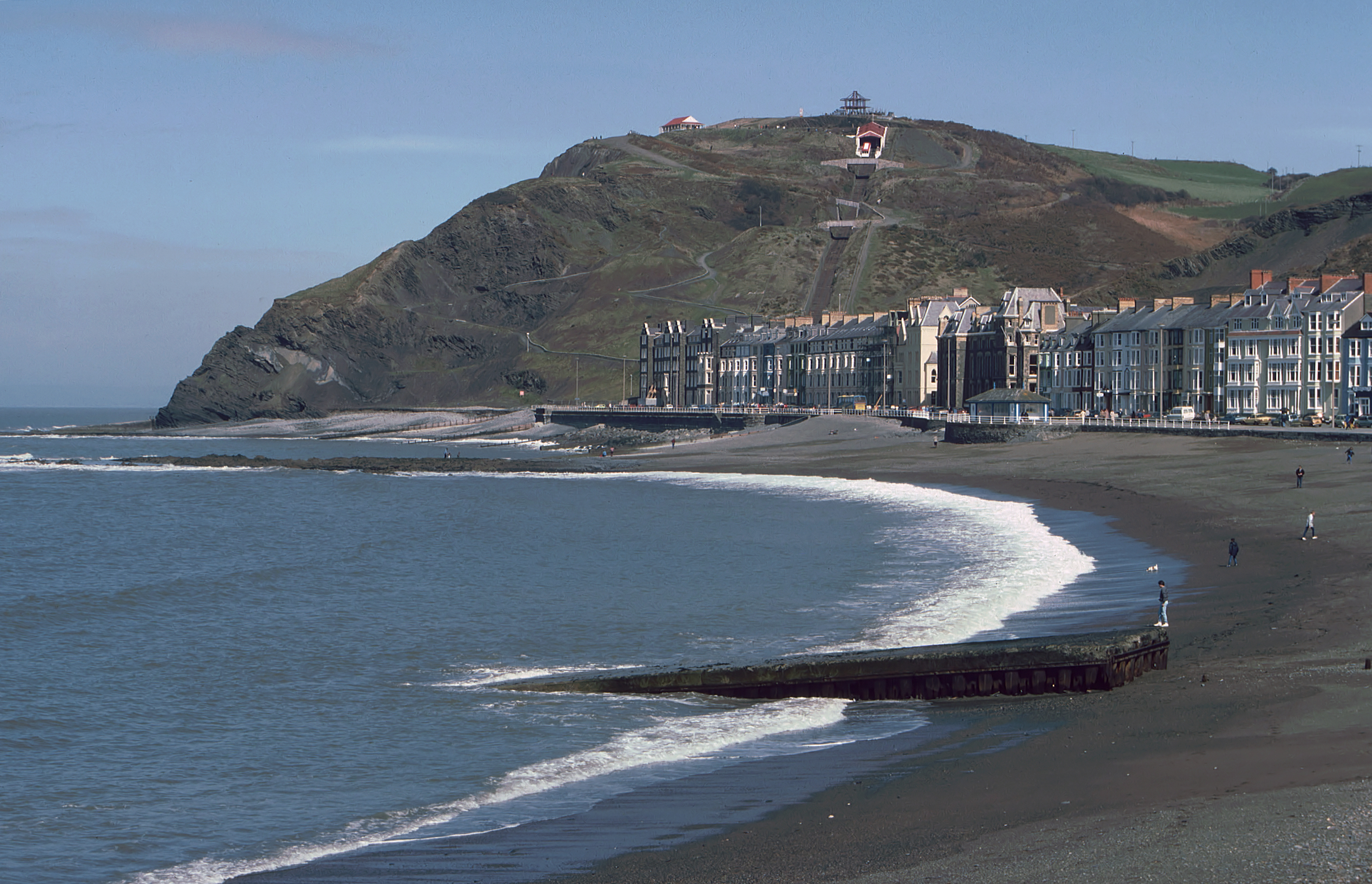
- View of the promenade, Aberystwyth, 1985, with Constitution Hill rising above the seafront.

Highest point
- Elevation: 97.1 metres (319 ft)
- Coordinates: 52°25′30″N 4°4′58.8″W

Naming
- Native name: Craig-glais (Welsh)
- Pronunciation: Welsh pronunciation: [kraɪg glais]

Geography
- Location within Wales
- Location: Ceredigion, Wales
- Topo map(s): OS Explorer 213 - Aberystwyth & Cwm Rheidol

Climbing
- Easiest route: Via Aberystwyth Cliff Railway

Constitution Hill (Welsh: Craig-glais Welsh pronunciation: [krai̯ɡ glai̯s]) is a hill in the Welsh town of Aberystwyth, situated to the north of the town.

The hill overlooks Cardigan Bay in Ceredigion, Wales, running between the town and the coastal settlements Borth and Clarach to the north. The site provides good views of Aberystwyth, and the sightline extends as far as Snowdonia National Park and north Pembrokeshire.

Since 1896, the Aberystwyth Cliff Railway has ascended to the hill's summit, and the summit features a camera obscura, which is a 1980s rebuild of a Victorian era building which was erected as part of the "Luna Park" recreation area.

At its peak runs the Clarach Footpath on the Wales Coast Path, which connects the town of Aberystwyth with Clarach Bay. Nearby is the Borth – Clarach Site of Special Scientific Interest. The hill itself is often referred to as "Consti" by locals.

== Description ==
Constitution Hill is located on the western coast of Wales on Cardigan Bay, lying north of the town of Aberystwyth and to the south of the Clarach Bay holiday park. The hill is traversed from south to north by the Wales Coast Path.

At the base of the hill there is an apotropaic site, where people stop at a metal piece in the ground, and perform a ritual known as "kicking the bar", using the soles of their feet. The origin of this custom is unknown, with researchers having several theories as to its origin.

== Human history ==
From medieval times up until the early twentieth century, Constitution Hill was the site of several large quarries which, along with others in the area, provided much of the stone required to build the town of Aberystwyth including its castle.

In 1895 the Aberystwyth Improvement Company was formed, a business venture with the goal of developing the hill for leisure and tourism. The company was financed by businessman George Newnes and the project to develop the hill was engineered by George Croydon Marks. The company developed the hill extensively over the following years, including the construction of a restaurant and arcades at the bottom, a theme park called Luna Park and the original camera obscura, and the Aberystwyth Cliff Railway. The Luna Park development did not survive long, as successive summers of poor weather in the early twentieth century limited visitor numbers. The railway, which operated over a length of 778 feet (237 m) on a standard gauge at a gradient steeper than 50%, and opened in 1896, proved more successful. Initially powered by pouring water into a tank in the descending car, it was converted to electric operation in 1921.

The original camera obscura and other Victorian features on the hill's summit were abandoned and became derelict during the first half of the 20th century, and by 1959 only one building remained. The site was redeveloped in the 1980s, with the modern camera obscura and other facilities being built.
