= Aberystwyth Town Council =

Community council in Ceredigion, Wales

Type
- Type: Town council

Leadership
- Mayor: Emlyn Jones
- Deputy Mayor: Dylan Lewis-Rowlands

Structure
- Seats: 19
- Political groups: Plaid Cymru (16); Liberal Democrats (1); Labour Party (0); Independent (2)

Elections
- Last election: 5 May 2022
- Next election: 5 May 2027

Meeting place
- Neuadd Gwenfrewi, Queen's Road, Aberystwyth, SY23 2HS

Website
- www.aberystwyth.gov.uk

Aberystwyth Town Council (Welsh: Cyngor Tref Aberystwyth) is the community council that governs the ancient borough, town and community of Aberystwyth. For electoral purposes, it is divided into five electoral divisions (often known as wards).

== Background ==
The council appoints a chairman as its presiding officer who is then known as the Mayor of Aberystwyth. The Town Council is now a statutory body, but it also holds the town's Borough Charter in trust, granted by King Edward I on 28 December 1277 and confirmed by successive monarchs, resulting in the members also being charter trustees. Since the Municipal Corporations Act 1835 came into force, Aberystwyth's status as a borough has been wholly ceremonial. The Local Government Act 1972 (in force from 1 April 1974) prevents the town council being known in name as a borough council as previously, although the town councillors as charter trustees can still, for example, take part in all of the ceremonial activities (wearing civic outfits), elect mayors (who can wear the chain of office) and organise markets (according to the original royal charter).

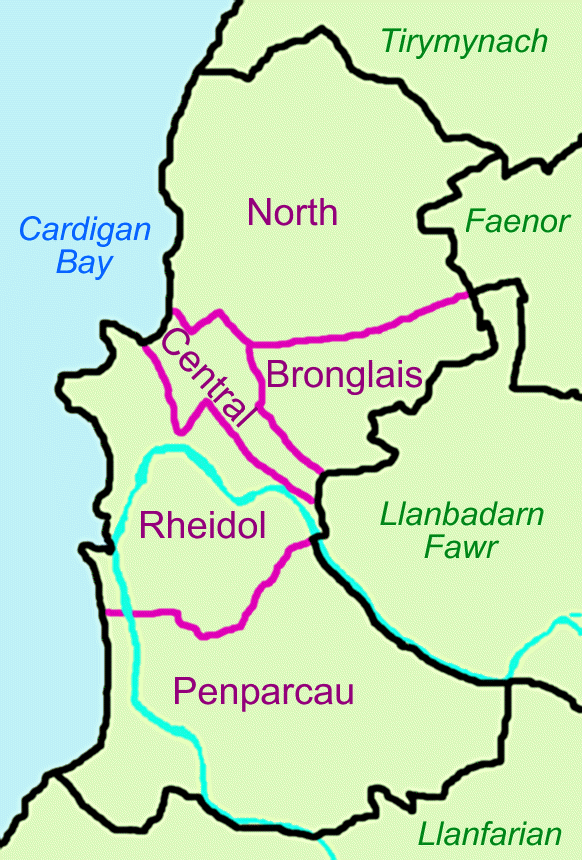
Aberystwyth council wards.

Aberystwyth Town Council comprises five wards — Bronglais, Central, North, Penparcau and Rheidol — electing between three and five town councillors each.

Clockwise, from the north, it borders the communities of Tirymynach, Faenor, Llanbadarn Fawr and Llanfarian.

== Composition as at 2023 ==
Group affiliation	Members
Plaid Cymru	12
Liberal Democrats	2
Labour	1
Independent	1
Total	18 out of 19

== Election history ==
Aberystwyth Town Council is made up of 19 councillors elected from the five wards. The most recent elections were held in 2022. Plaid Cymru have an overall majority. There are currently 2 vacancies for the council, in Penparcau Ward (06/06/25).

=== 2026 by-election ===
Following the resignation of Cllr Mair Benjamin, a by-election was held in the Rheidol ward on 19 March 2026. The by-election was won by Plaid Cymru's Felix Lorenze.

Aberystwyth (Rheidol): 19 March 2026
Party	Candidate	Votes	%	±%
Plaid Cymru	Felix Lorenze	133	33.5	+0.2
Green	Tomass Jereminovics	128	32.2	N/A
Liberal Democrats	Alec Dauncey	84	21.2	−13.4
Independent	Lloyd Baker Warburton	52	13.1	N/A
Rejected ballots		3		
Majority		5	1.3	N/A
Turnout		400	22.1	−14.8
Plaid Cymru gain from Liberal Democrats		Swing	N/A	

=== 2022 election ===
The 2022 Aberystwyth Town Council elections were held alongside the elections for Ceredigion County council on 5 May 2022. All 14 seats from the Bronglais, Central, North and Rheidol wards were up for election. There was no election in the Penparcau ward as there were only 2 candidates for the 5 seats representing the ward. The election resulted in 12 seats for Plaid Cymru, 2 for Labour, 1 for Liberal Democrats and 3 vacant seats which were filled by co-option.

Ward	Party	Town councillors elected 2022
Bronglais	Plaid Cymru	Talat Chaudhri
Bronglais	Plaid Cymru	Lucy Huws
Bronglais	Plaid Cymru	Mari Turner
Bronglais	Plaid Cymru	Alun Williams
Central	Plaid Cymru	Owain Hughes
Central	Plaid Cymru	Emlyn Wyn Jones
Central	Plaid Cymru	Sienna Quinn Lewis
North	Plaid Cymru	Maldwyn Pryse
North	Plaid Cymru	Jeff Smith
North	Plaid Cymru	Mark Antony Strong
Penparcau	Independent	Julien Brun (co-opted)
Penparcau	Labour	Dylan Lewis-Rowlands
Penparcau	Plaid Cymru	Carl Worrall (co-opted)
Penparcau	Liberal Democrats	Bryony Davies (co-opted)
Penparcau	Plaid Cymru	Nishant Chandolia (co-opted)
Rheidol	Liberal Democrats	Mair Benjamin
Rheidol	Plaid Cymru	Brian Davies
Rheidol	Plaid Cymru	Kerry Elizabeth Ferguson
Rheidol	Labour Co-op	Matthew Norman

=== 2017 election ===
The 2017 Aberystwyth town council elections were held alongside the elections for Ceredigion County council on 4 May 2017. All 19 seats were up for election, which resulted in the election of 11 councillors for Plaid Cymru, 6 for the Welsh Liberal Democrats and 2 Welsh Labour councillors. One seat became vacant in May 2017, reducing the number held by the Welsh Liberal Democrats to 5. This position was filled by Brendan Somers in September 2017, bringing the total number of Plaid councillors up to 12. However, Councillor Brendan Somers resigned from Plaid Cymru on 30 April 2019 and sat as an independent.

Ward	Party	Town councillors elected 2017
Bronglais	Plaid Cymru	Alun Williams
Bronglais	Plaid Cymru	Susan Jane Jones-Davies
Bronglais	Plaid Cymru	Endaf Edwards
Bronglais	Plaid Cymru	Lucy Huws
Central	Liberal Democrats	David Lees
Central	Liberal Democrats	Emily Price (deceased 12 May 2017)
Central	Liberal Democrats	Michael Chappell
North	Plaid Cymru	Mark Strong
North	Plaid Cymru	Talat Chaudhri
North	Plaid Cymru	Sara Hammel
Penparcau	Plaid Cymru	Steve Davies
Penparcau	Plaid Cymru	Dylan Lewis
Penparcau	Liberal Democrats	Charlie Kingsbury
Penparcau	Labour	Alex Mangold
Penparcau	Liberal Democrats	Brenda Haines
Rheidol	Liberal Democrats	Mair Benjamin
Rheidol	Labour	Claudine Young
Rheidol	Plaid Cymru	Rhodri Francis
Rheidol	Plaid Cymru	Mari Turner

=== 2012 election ===
The 2012 Aberystwyth town council elections were held alongside the elections for Ceredigion County council on 3 May 2012. All 19 seats were up for election. The 2012 elections had previously resulted in 11 councillors for Plaid Cymru, 5 for the Welsh Lib Democrats and 3 independents. Lucy Teresa Huws (Plaid Cymru) was elected for Bronglais Ward in November 2013, replacing Christopher Griffiths. Brendan Somers (Plaid Cymru) joined for Central Ward in January 2014, replacing Carys Morgan (resigned 2013), and Dr Talat Zafar Chaudhri (Plaid Cymru) joined for Penparcau in September 2015, replacing Dylan Lewis (resigned 2015). There were subsequently 12 councillors for Plaid Cymru, 4 for the Welsh Liberal Democrats and 3 independents for the remainder of the term.

Ward	Party	Town councillors elected 2012
Bronglais	Plaid Cymru	Alun Williams
Bronglais	Plaid Cymru	Susan Jane Jones-Davies
Bronglais	Plaid Cymru	Endaf Edwards
Bronglais	Plaid Cymru	Christopher Griffiths
Central	Liberal Democrats	Ceredig Davies
Central	Liberal Democrats	Sarah Bowen
Central	Plaid Cymru	Carys Morgan
North	Plaid Cymru	Mark Strong
North	Independent	Aled Davies
North	Plaid Cymru	Jeff Smith
Penparcau	Plaid Cymru	Steve Davies
Penparcau	Independent	Dylan Lewis
Penparcau	Plaid Cymru	Mererid Jones
Penparcau	Plaid Cymru	Kevin Price
Penparcau	Liberal Democrats	Brenda Haines
Rheidol	Liberal Democrats	Wendy Morris-Twiddy
Rheidol	Plaid Cymru	Brian Davies
Rheidol	Liberal Democrats	Mair Benjamin (resigned from the Liberal Democrats on 15 May 2012)
Rheidol	Independent	Martin Shewring

=== 2008–2012 by-elections ===
By-election	Date	Incumbent party	Result	Candidate	Reason
Rheidol	18 September 2008	Liberal Democrats	Liberal Democrats	Martin Shewring	Resignation of Elian Lorrae Jones-Southgate
Penparcau	18 September 2008	Independent	Plaid Cymru	Owain Jones	Death of Owen Jones
Central	25 November 2010	Liberal Democrats	Liberal Democrats	Ceredig Davies	Resignation of Trevor Shaftoe
Rheidol	4 August 2011	Liberal Democrats	Liberal Democrats	Wendy Morris-Twiddy	Resignation of Martin Shewring

=== 2008 election ===
In the 2008 elections, 9 seats were won by Plaid Cymru, 6 by the Welsh Liberal Democrats, 2 by independents, 1 by Welsh Labour and 1 by the Green Party.

Ward	Party	Town councillors elected 2008
Bronglais	Plaid Cymru	Alun Williams
Bronglais	Plaid Cymru	Susan Jane Jones-Davies
Bronglais	Plaid Cymru	Aled Davies
Bronglais	Plaid Cymru	Ann-Marie Hinde
Central	Liberal Democrats	Alec Dauncey
Central	Plaid Cymru	Lyn Lewis Dafis
Central	Liberal Democrats	Trevor Graham Shaftoe
North	Green	Christopher Guy Borrill Simpson
North	Plaid Cymru	Mark Strong
North	Plaid Cymru	Dafydd Wyn Thomas
Penparcau	Plaid Cymru	Rob Gorman
Penparcau	Independent	Goronwy Edwards
Penparcau	Plaid Cymru	Steve Davies
Penparcau	Independent	Owen Jones
Penparcau	Labour	Richard Boudier
Rheidol	Liberal Democrats	Elian Lorrae Jones-Southgate
Rheidol	Liberal Democrats	Sam Hearne
Rheidol	Liberal Democrats	Mair Benjamin
Rheidol	Liberal Democrats	Ceri Meehan

== Mayoral history ==
Year	Name	Party	Notes
2022-23	Talat Chaudhri	Plaid Cymru	
2021-22	Alun Williams	Plaid Cymru	
2020-21	Charlie Kingsbury	Liberal Democrats	
2019-20	Mari Rhian Turner	Plaid Cymru	
2018-19	Talat Zafar Chaudhri	Plaid Cymru	First Pakistani Punjabi and ethnic minority mayor of Aberystwyth.
2017-18	Steve Davies	Plaid Cymru	Elected as Plaid Cymru mayoral candidate and mayor-elect.
2016-17	Brendan Somers	Plaid Cymru	Lost seat at election held on 4 May 2017
2015-16	Endaf Edwards	Plaid Cymru	
2014-15	Brenda Haines	Liberal Democrats	
2013-14	Wendy Morris-Twiddy	Liberal Democrats	
2012-13	Dylan Wilson-Lewis	Independent	
2011-12	Richard Boudier	Labour	General election candidate for Ceredigion UK parliamentary constituency
2010-11	Samantha Hearne	Liberal Democrats	
2009-10	Trevor Shaftoe	Liberal Democrats	
2008-09	Susan Jones-Davies	Plaid Cymru	
2007-08	Lorrae Jones-Southgate	Liberal Democrats	Resigned June 2008.
2006-07	Michael Jones	Plaid Cymru	
2005-06	Aled Davies	Plaid Cymru	
2004-05	John T. James	Plaid Cymru	Independent from March 2005.
2003-04	John T. James	Plaid Cymru	
2002-03	Carol Kolczak	Liberal Democrats	
2000-01	Jaci Taylor	Plaid Cymru	
1999-00	Siôn Jobbins	Plaid Cymru	
1998-99	Graham T. Parry	Liberal Democrats	
1997-98	Elin Jones	Plaid Cymru	
1996-97	Carol Kolczak	Liberal Democrats	
1995-96	Hywel Jones	Independent	Removed from office February 1996.
1994-95	Bob Griffin	Liberal Democrats	Husband of Rose Simpson.
