= Giants (Welsh folklore) =

Creature in Welsh mythology

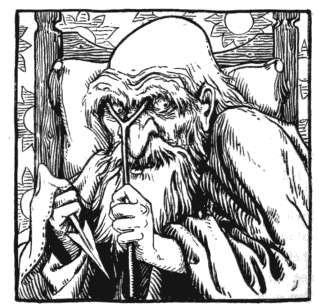
Ysbaddaden, chief of giants, illustrated by John D. Batten

Giants (Welsh: cewri) feature prominently in Welsh folklore and mythology. Among the most notable are Bendigeidfran fab Llyr, a mythological king of Britain during the Second Branch of the Mabinogi, Idris Gawr of Cader Idris, and Ysbaddaden Bencawr, the chief antagonist of the early Arthurian tale How Culhwch won Olwen. Both Arthur and Gwalchmai fab Gwyar feature prominently as giant-slayers in Welsh tradition.

Giants are also described by Geoffrey of Monmouth as the original inhabitants of Britain, who were overwhelmed by human settlers.

== Tales ==
=== Giants in the Mabinogion ===
In the Second Branch of the Mabinogi, Branwen ferch Llyr, Britain is ruled by the giant Bran the Blessed, who has never been able to fit inside any dwelling. Also in the Second Branch, the Pair Dadeni (Cauldron of Rebirth) is brought to Wales from Ireland by the giant Llassar Llaes Gyfnewid and his wife, Cymidei Cymeinfoll.

In Culhwch and Olwen, giants feature as antagonists throughout. Ysbaddaden, chief of giants, is the father of Olwen, a beautiful maiden sought by Culhwch fab Cilydd, a cousin of King Arthur's. He is slain at the tale's close by his nephew Goreu fab Custennin, while Wrnach, another giant, is killed by Cei. Cei is also described in this story to be able to expand his height to that of a tree.

=== Legend of Rhitta Gawr ===
A well-known tale concerns Rhitta (or Rhudda) Gawr, a giant who held court in Snowdonia. He marched against warring kings Nyniaw and Peibaw, overwhelmed their armies and took their beards as trophies of his victory and fashioned them into a cap for himself. The twenty-six kings of Britain assembled their armies to destroy Rhitta but were vanquished by the giant, who cut off the kings' beards and fashioned a great cape out of them to protect him from the cold. Sometime later, as Arthur "washed his hands after slaying the red-eyed giant of Cernyw", he received a message from Rhitta, demanding his beard to patch his cloak. Arthur refused, and Rhitta marched south with his armies to claim it from him. In the resulting confrontation, Rhitta is forced to shear his own beard, and retreats "much humbled in stature but much wiser in knowledge". A variant tale claims that after receiving the demands, Arthur marched furiously up to Snowdonia and fought against the giant in a duel, in which he "lifted up his sword and struck Rhitta on the crown of the head a blow so fiercely-wounding, severely-venomous and sternly-smiting that it cut through all his head armour and his skin and his flesh and clove him in twain.", According to the story, Arthur commands that a cairn be built over his body which forms Gwyddfa Rhudda (Rhita's Cairn). Over the intervening centuries the name of Rhudda was forgotten and Gwyddfa Rhudda became known as Yr Wyddfa.

=== The Capture of Maelor Gawr ===
Maelor Gawr, the giant of Castell Maelor (now the village of Penparcau), was captured in Cyfeilog, about twelve miles from his own castle and was sentenced to death. His enemies allowed him his final request to blow on his horn three times before his death. The first time he blew, his hair and beard fell out, and on the second blast of his horn, so great was the strength and force of the sounding that all his finger and toe-nails fell off completely. On the third blast of his horn the intensity of the force of the sound caused the horn to be broken into small pieces.

Maelor's son, Cornippin, who was hunting with his horse and his hound, heard the sound of his father's hand and lamented over his suffering. He made to rescue his father and in riding with such haste and swiftness, he tore the head of his hound off its body. He spurred his horse onwards, leaped in one great bound over the Ystwyth river and attacked his father's captors. In the ensuing battle, Cornippin was slain.

=== Cribwr Gawr ===
Cribwr the Giant lived in Castell Cefn Cribwr in Morgannwg. His three sisters were all killed by Arthur through "treachery". Arthur succeeded in slaying the giantesses by nicknaming himself as "Hot Pottage" to the first sister, and "Warm Porridge" to the second sister and as "a morsel of bread" to the third, and when the first sister called for help against Hot Pottage Cribwr answered: Wench, let him cool; and in the same manner he answered the second sister, when she sought assistance against Warm Porridge. And the third sister called out that the Morsel of Bread was choking her; and to this he answered, Wench, take a smaller piece. And when Cribwr reproached Arthur for killing his sisters Arthur replied:

Cribwr take thy combs

And cease with currish anger

If I get a real chance—surely

What they have had, thou shalt have too.

== Other notable giants ==
The Historia Brittonum claims that Benlli Gawr was an early king of Powys, who was burned to death after acting aggressively towards Germanus of Auxerre.

Canthrig Bwt, a giantess and witch notorious in the folklore of Gwynedd, lived under a great stone in Nant Peris and killed and ate a number of the community's children.

Gogfran the Giant is recorded in the Welsh Triads as the father of Gwenhwyfar, Arthur's third wife. A tale tells of the imprisonment of a number of his sons by the giants of Bron Wrgan, leading to Arthur's attack on the abode to free his brothers-in-law.

A maritime folklore tale relates how the Devil fashioned a ship from wood cut in the underworld that he used to transport the sinful dead. When St. David destroyed the ship with his spear, a giant used the mast as a toothpick and the mainsail as a handkerchief.
