= Aberystwyth Rheidol =

Electoral ward in Ceredigion, Wales

Coordinates: 52.409°N 4.085°W

- Electoral ward
- Location within Ceredigion
- Population: 2,731 (2011 census)
- Community: Aberystwyth
- Principal area: Ceredigion
- Country: Wales
- Sovereign state: United Kingdom
- UK Parliament: Ceredigion Preseli
- Senedd Cymru – Welsh Parliament: Ceredigion
- Councillors: 1 (County), 4 (Town)

Aberystwyth Rheidol is an electoral ward in the town of Aberystwyth, Ceredigion, Wales. It elects a county councillor to Ceredigion County Council and also elects town councillors to Aberystwyth Town Council.

== Description ==
The Rheidol ward covers the area immediately southwest of the town centre surrounding the mouth of the River Rheidol. It includes Aberystwyth Castle, the Old College buildings and Council Offices in the north of the ward, with Aberystwyth Marina and the residential area of Trefechan towards the south. The Aberystwyth South ward (known as Penparcau for elections to the town council) borders to the south and Aberystwyth Canol/Central to the east.

According to the 2011 UK Census the population of the community/ward was 2,731.

Aberystwyth Rheidol was created following The County of Ceredigion (Electoral Changes) Order 2002, which divided Llanbadarn Fawr, Cardigan and Aberystwyth into new electoral divisions. Aberystwyth was divided into five electoral wards (previously East, North, South and West), with Aberystwyth Rheidol coterminous with the boundaries of the previous Riverside community ward. It would elect one county councillor.

== Town Council ==
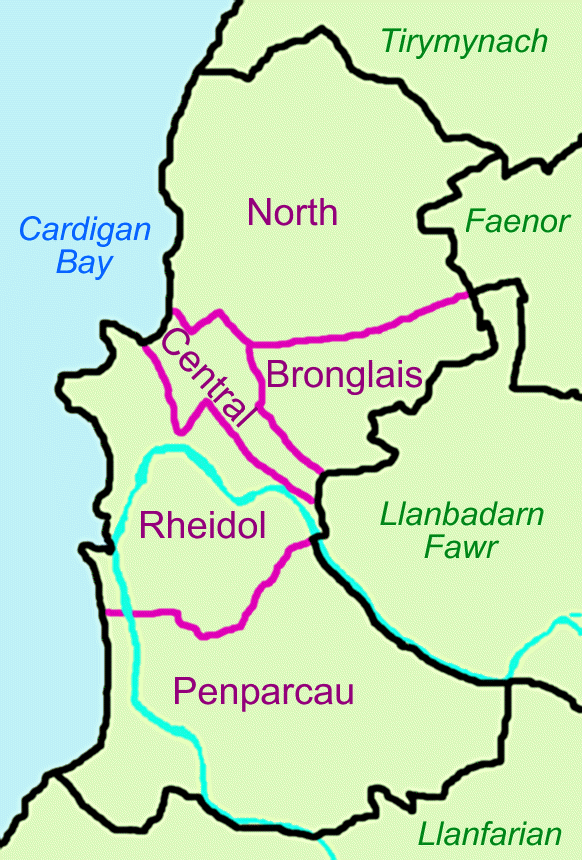
Aberystwyth town council wards

The Rheidol ward elects four town councillors to Aberystwyth Town Council. At the election on 5 May 2017 two Plaid Cymru councillors, one Welsh Liberal Democrat and one Labour Party councillor were elected.

== County Council ==
Since 2004 Aberystwyth Rheidol ward has elected one county councillor to Ceredigion County Council. Liberal Democrat councillor Eric Griffiths was elected in May 2004 and May 2008. Cllr Griffiths resigned at the end of May 2008 after being arrested by the police and cautioned for a sexual offence. A by-election was arranged for 10 July 2008. Rheidol town councillor and recently elected Aberystwyth mayor, Lorrae Jones-Southgate, resigned her position after she wasn't chosen as the new Liberal Democrat candidate for the ward.

At the by-election on 10 July 2008 Plaid Cymru candidate, Aled Davies, won the seat with 271 votes. The Liberal Democrat candidate was second with 252 votes.

Aled Davies won the seat in the May 2012 county elections standing as an independent, with an increased majority. Plaid Cymru and the Lib Dems came in second and third places. In 2015 it was publicised that Davies had only attended 5 of the 22 previous council meetings. He put this down to his other job making it difficult to attend meetings. He added "sometimes these meetings are a complete waste of time and decisions have been made beforehand anyway. I do a lot of work in the community and find it hard as an independent member, fighting as a lone individual against other affiliated members."

At the May 2017 elections five candidates stood for the Aberystwyth Rheidol seat. It was won by Plaid Cymru candidate, Endaf Edwards, with the previous sitting councillor, Aled Davies, finishing third. Endaf Edwards was re-elected at the 2022 local elections.
