= Maelor Gawr =

Mythical Celtic king and giant

Maelor Gawr is an early Celtic king and giant of Welsh mythology, who lived in Castell Maelor, Pen Dinas also known as (Dinas Maelor) in Penparcau, a village near Aberystwyth before "the coming of Brutus to this island". The tale of Maelor and his three sons, Cornippyn, Crygyn and Bwba, is recorded in the late sixteenth century Welsh text "Olion Cewri Cymru..." ("The Giants of Wales and their dwellings") by Sion Dafydd Rhys (with the antiquarian spelling Maylor Gawr).

It came to pass that Maelor was captured in the cwmwd of Cyfeiliog, about twelve miles from his own castle and was sentenced to death. His enemies allowed him his final request to blow on his horn three times before his death. The first time he blew, his hair and beard fell out, and on the second blast of his horn, so great was the strength and force of the sounding that all his finger and toe-nails fell off completely. On the third blast of his horn the intensity of the force of the sound caused the horn to be broken into small pieces.

Cornippyn, who was hunting with his horse and his hound, heard the sound of his father's horn and lamented over his suffering. He made to rescue his father and in riding with such haste and swiftness, he tore the head of his hound off its body. He spurred his horse onwards, leaped in one great bound over the Ystwyth river and attacked his father's captors. In the ensuing battle, Cornippin was slain.

The other sons, Crygyn and Bwba, lived in Llanilar and Llanbadarn Fawr respectively, and murdered any man who approached their stronghold. They were both killed themselves through cunning, by an unnamed warrior in the same night.

== Myth, folklore and legend ==
Contemporary stories still relate to one of the more unusual residents of Penparcau village, the headless dog of King Maelor's son Cornippyn. The myth tells of how a giant, going to his father's rescue, rode at such a rate that his dog could not keep up with him and its head came off in the leash. The dog now roams, mournfully crying and looking for its long-lost owner.

The name Maelor survives in local legend and refers to the fields directly south of Pen Dinas in the valley east of Tan-y-Bwlch as Maelorddin (City of Maelor) or more accurately Caerau Maelorddin meaning (Fields of the City of Maelor.
