= David John de Lloyd =

British composer (1883–1948)

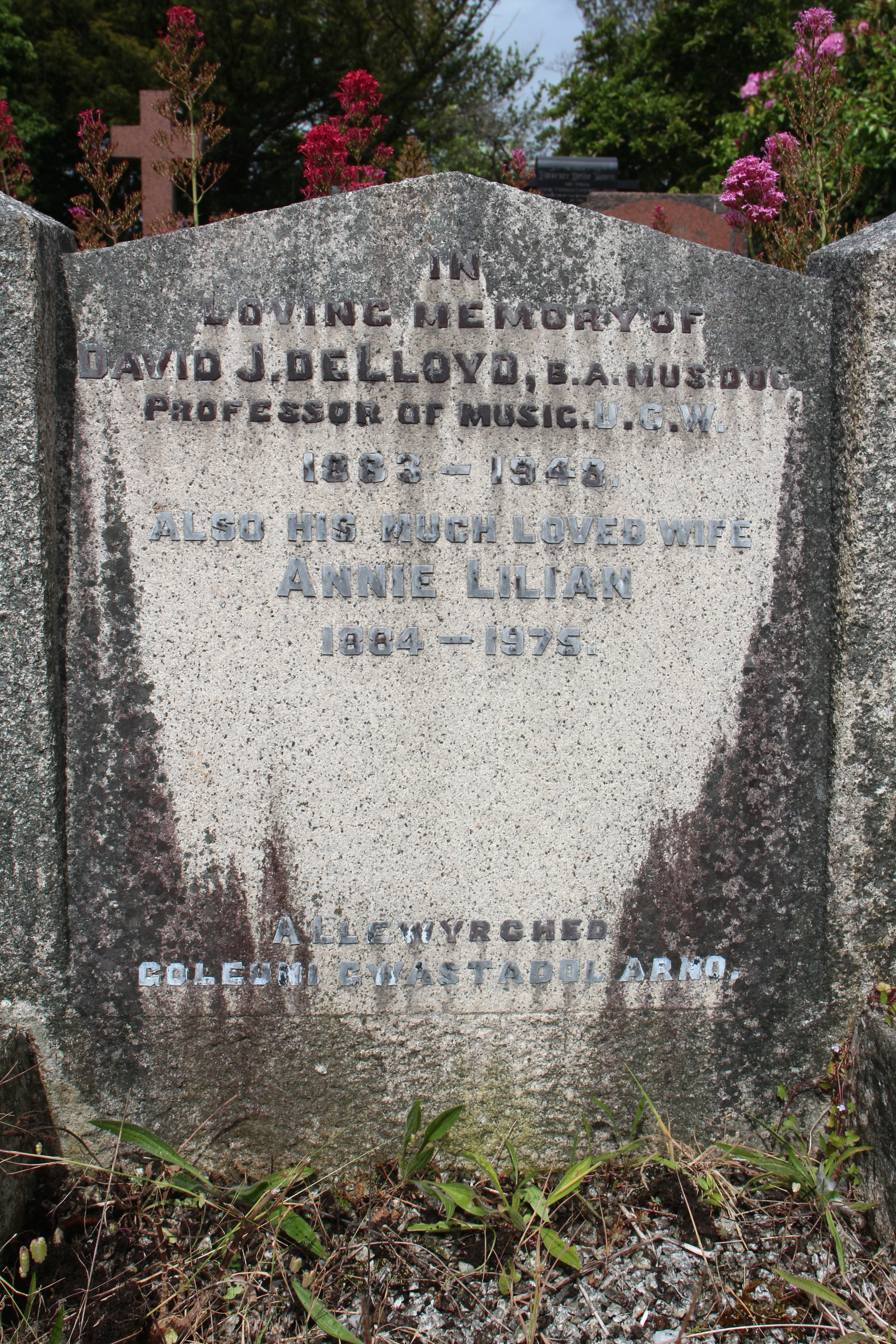
Gravestone of David de Lloyd in Aberystwyth Cemetery

David John de Lloyd (30 April 1883 – 20 August 1948) was a Welsh musician and composer.

Born in Skewen near Neath, de Lloyd was the son of an insurance agent and the family moved with the latter's employment until they settled in Penparcau a village near Aberystwyth, Ceredigion, while David was a small boy. As a child, he met John Spencer Curwen, son of the inventor of the tonic sol-fa, and assisted Curwen in several demonstrations. David attended the University of Wales, Aberystwyth. In 1905, he became the college's first B.Mus. graduate. He obtained a grant to study in Leipzig and obtained a doctorate in music from the Trinity College Dublin. In 1926, he replaced Sir Walford Davies as Professor of Music at University of Wales, Aberystwyth. De Lloyd became closely involved with the Eisteddfod movement, and was a collector and arranger of Welsh folk music. His arrangements were published as Forty Welsh Traditional Tunes in 1929. Many of his other works can be found archived at the British Library in Welsh and English here. Most recently his work 'Er Cof' was performed Sunday, 30 June 2019, Bethel Chapel, Aberystwyth by Meirion Wynn Jones (organ) as part of the Gregynog Festival. His opera, Tir Na N'Og, was performed on 25 July 2026 as part of MusicFest Aberystwyth.

He died in 1948. Sidney Northcote wrote, "The death of Dr. David de Lloyd has robbed Wales of a musical impulse she cannot afford to lose and certainly must not be allowed to forget."

A collection of his writings both personal and published can be found in the National Library of Wales.

== Works ==
- Gwlad fy Nhadau (Cantata) (1914)
- Arglwydd, Gad i Ni, Rai Euog (Hymn) (1918)
- Castell Bere (Hymn) (1918)
- Richmond Hill (Hymn) (1918)
- Williamsburg (Hymn) (1918)
- Er Cof (1924)
- Tu draw i’r llen / Beyond the Veil (Extended Anthem) (1924)
- Gwenllian (Opera) (1925)
- Hywel of Gwent
- Pwyll a Rhiannon
- Y Requiem Gymraeg
- Dydd a Nos / Day and Night (Cantata for children) (1927)
- Tir Na N'Og (Opera) (libretto by T. Gwynn Jones) (1932)
- Saith o Ganeuon enwog Brahms
- Dos Wanwyn, Dos
- Cyfellion Bach yr Haf
- Ystyriwch y Lili / Consider the Lilies
