= 2017 Ceredigion County Council election =

2017 Welsh local government election

- 4 May 2017

All 42 seats to Ceredigion County Council 22 seats needed for a majority
	First party	Second party
Leader	Ellen ap Gwynn
Party	Plaid Cymru	Independent
Leader's seat	Ceulanamaesmawr
Last election	19 seats, 39.2%	15 seats, 28.6%
Seats before	19	14
Seats won	20	13
Seat change	▲1	▼1
Popular vote	8,554	7,509
Percentage	36.1%	32.7%
Swing	▼3.1%	▲4.1%
	Third party	Fourth party
Leader	Ceredig Davies	Hag Harris
Party	Liberal Democrats	Labour
Leader's seat	Aberystwyth, Central	Lampeter
Last election	7 seats, 25.4%	1 seat, 3.2%
Seats before	7	1
Seats won	8	1
Seat change	▲1	Steady
Popular vote	5,406	1,545
Percentage	22.8%	6.5%
Swing	▼2.6%	▲3.3%
- Ceredigion local election results 2017
Council control before election
Ellen ap Gwynn
Plaid Cymru & Independent coalition
Council control after election
Ellen ap Gwynn
Plaid Cymru & Independent coalition

The 2017 election to Ceredigion County Council was held on 4 May 2017 when local elections took place across Wales. It was preceded by the 2012 election and followed by the 2022 election.

== Results ==
Plaid Cymru remained the largest party on 5 May 2017, but fell short of an overall majority with 19 councillors. However, James Wyn Reynolds Thomas (Plaid Cymru) was elected unopposed on 11 May 2017 for the Llandyfriog ward, bringing the number of Plaid councillors on the Council up to 20. Eight seats, out of the 42 available, had candidates elected unopposed.

Ceredigion local election result 2017
Party	Seats	Gains	Losses	Net gain/loss	Seats %	Votes %	Votes	+/−
Plaid Cymru	20	+4	-3	+1	46.0	36.11	8,554	
Independent	13	+2	-4	-2	32.0	32.70	7,509	
Liberal Democrats	8	+1	0	+1	20.0	22.82	5,406	
Labour	1	0	0	0	2.0	6.52	1,545	
Conservative	0	0	0	0	0.0	1.02	241	
NHA	0	0	0	0	0.0	0.96	228	
Green	0	0	0	0	0.0	0.87	207	
Total	42						23,690	

== Background ==
The 2012 elections saw Plaid Cymru win 19 seats, independents 15 seats, Liberal Democrats 7 seats and the Labour Party one seat, leaving the council in no overall control, with Plaid Cymru three seats short of a majority. After the election the Independents agreed to work with Plaid Cymru, as did the sole Labour councillor, creating a coalition.

During the term Gethin James (Ind, Aberporth) joined UKIP but said that he would still sit in the Cabinet. This was strongly opposed by both the leader of the council Ellen ap Gwynn (Plaid, Ceulanamaesmawr) and by the leader of Plaid Cymru, Leanne Wood. He eventually resigned from his cabinet post and sat on the opposition benches with the Liberal Democrats; and lost his Aberporth seat in the 2017 election.

At the close of nominations on 4 April 2017, the numbers of candidates nominated were as follows: Plaid Cymru 35, Independents 27, Liberal Democrats 22, Labour Party 9, Green Party 5, Conservatives 3, National Health Action Party 1.

== Ward results ==
Asterisks denote incumbent Councillors seeking re-election. Vote share changes compared with corresponding 2012 election.

=== Aberaeron ward ===
Aberaeron ward
Party	Candidate	Votes	%	±%
Liberal Democrats	Elizabeth Evans*	559	88.45	−2.88
Plaid Cymru	Owain Arwel Glyn Hughes	73	11.55	+2.88
Majority		486	76.90	−5.74
Turnout		632		
Liberal Democrats hold		Swing		

=== Aberporth ===
Aberporth ward
Party	Candidate	Votes	%	±%
Plaid Cymru	Gethin Davies	386	42.28	+15.56
Independent	Gethin James* (Note: Gethin James had joined UKIP after being elected as a councillor in 2012, but sought re-election as an independent candidate)	323	35.38	−25.89
Liberal Democrats	Stefani Flowers	114	12.49	+12.49
Conservative	Owen William Edward Millward	90	9.86	−2.15
Majority		63	6.90	−27.66
Turnout		913		
Plaid Cymru gain from Independent		Swing		

=== Aberystwyth, Bronglais ward ===
Aberystwyth, Bronglais ward
Party	Candidate	Votes	%	±%
Plaid Cymru	Alun John Wiliams*	342	81.04	−8.36
Liberal Democrats	Jamie Matthew Dearden	47	11.14	+11.14
Labour	Jamie Christopher Scott	33	7.82	+7.82
Majority		295	69.90	−8.90
Turnout		422		
Plaid Cymru hold		Swing		

=== Aberystwyth, Central ward ===
Aberystwyth, Central ward
Party	Candidate	Votes	%	±%
Liberal Democrats	Ceredig Wyn Davies*	215	64.18	+1.75
Plaid Cymru	Jeff Alfred Smith	73	21.79	−9.83
Green	Julie Karen Makin	35	10.45	+10.45
Independent	Mark Robert Bolderston	12	3.58	+3.58
Majority		142	42.39	+11.58
Turnout		335		
Liberal Democrats hold		Swing		

=== Aberystwyth, North ward ===
Aberystwyth, North ward
Party	Candidate	Votes	%	±%
Plaid Cymru	Mark Antony Strong*	313	63.49	+22.06
Liberal Democrats	Bryony Siân Davies	180	36.51	+4.14
Majority		133	26.98	+17.92
Turnout		493		
Plaid Cymru hold		Swing		

=== Aberystwyth, Penparcau ward ===
Cllr. Jones-Southgate was elected as a Plaid Cymru councillor for this ward in 2012 but subsequently became an independent. She stood for the Liberal Democrats in the Llanfarian ward in 2008.

Aberystwyth, Penparcau ward (two seats)
Party	Candidate	Votes	%	±%
Plaid Cymru	Steve Davies*	354	44.19	
Liberal Democrats	Glyndwr Lloyd Edwards	251	31.34	
Plaid Cymru	Dylan Paul Lewis	247	30.84	
Independent	Elian Lorrai Jones-Southgate*	216	26.97	
Liberal Democrats	Charlie Kingsbury	213	26.59	
Labour	Alex Mangold	177	22.10	
Majority				
Turnout		801		
Plaid Cymru hold		Swing		
Liberal Democrats gain from Independent		Swing		

=== Aberystwyth, Rheidol ward ===
Aberystwyth, Rheidol ward
Party	Candidate	Votes	%	±%
Plaid Cymru	Mark Endaf Edwards	170	27.87	+5.14
Liberal Democrats	Mair Benjamin	154	25.25	+3.47
Independent	John Aled Davies*	134	21.97	−10.94
Labour	Claudine Allison Young	97	15.90	+15.90
Independent	Martin Wyn Shewring	55	9.02	−10.06
Majority		16	2.62	
Turnout		610		
Plaid Cymru gain from Independent		Swing		

=== Beulah ward ===
Beulah ward
Party	Candidate	Votes	%	±%
Plaid Cymru	William David Lyndon Lloyd*	Unopposed		
Plaid Cymru hold				

=== Borth ward ===
Borth ward
Party	Candidate	Votes	%	±%
Independent	Ray Quant*	326	39.09	−10.49
Independent	Hugh Richard Michael Hughes	285	34.17	+34.17
Plaid Cymru	Kevin Roy Price	158	18.94	+18.94
Independent	Phil Turner-Wright	65	7.79	+7.79
Majority		41	4.92	−4.22
Turnout		834		
Independent hold		Swing		

=== Capel Dewi ward ===
Capel Dewi ward
Party	Candidate	Votes	%	±%
Independent	Thomas Peter Lloyd Davies*	362	58.86	+1.51
Plaid Cymru	John Gethin Jones	253	41.14	−1.51
Majority		109	17.72	+3.03
Turnout		615		
Independent hold		Swing		

- The election in 2017 was a repeat of the 2012 elections (with both candidates being re-nominated)

=== Cardigan, Mwldan ward ===
Cardigan, Mwldan ward
Party	Candidate	Votes	%	±%
Plaid Cymru	Thomas John Adams-Lewis*	411	52.56	−13.37
Liberal Democrats	Myfanwy Maehrlein	371	47.44	+20.04
Majority		40	4.82	
Turnout		782		
Plaid Cymru hold		Swing		

=== Cardigan, Rhydyfuwch ward ===
Cardigan, Rhydyfuwch ward
Party	Candidate	Votes	%	±%
Liberal Democrats	Anne Elaine Evans	258	64.99	−10.84
Plaid Cymru	Shan Elizabeth Williams	139	35.01	+10.84
Majority		119	29.98	
Turnout		397		
Liberal Democrats hold		Swing		

- Cllr. Mark Cole announced his intention to stand down from the council at these elections on 4 April, the last day for nominations

=== Cardigan, Teifi ward ===
Cardigan, Teifi ward
Party	Candidate	Votes	%	±%
Plaid Cymru	Catrin Miles*	168	58.33	−5.09
Liberal Democrats	Steven Paul Greenhalgh	120	41.67	+5.09
Majority		48	16.66	
Turnout		288		
Plaid Cymru hold		Swing		

- This is a repeat of the 2012 election (with both parties re-nominating the same candidates)

=== Ceulanamaesmawr ward ===
Ceulanamaesmawr ward
Party	Candidate	Votes	%	±%
Plaid Cymru	Ellen Elizabeth ap Gwynn*	452	55.12	−8.30
Independent	John Dilwyn Lewis	368	44.88	+44.88
Majority		84	10.24	
Turnout		820		
Plaid Cymru hold		Swing		

- Cllr. ap Gwynn became leader of the council after the 2012 elections.

=== Ciliau Aeron ward ===
Ciliau Aeron ward
Party	Candidate	Votes	%	±%
Independent	Marc Davies	443	51.63	+51.63
Plaid Cymru	John Edward Charles Lumley*	281	32.75	−17.88
Independent	Sonia Rose Williams	134	15.62	+15.62
Majority		162	18.88	
Turnout		858		
Independent gain from Plaid Cymru		Swing		

- Sonia Williams was the Liberal Democrat candidate in the 2012 elections.

=== Faenor ward ===
Faenor ward
Party	Candidate	Votes	%	±%
Liberal Democrats	John Erfyl Roberts*	413	57.20	−8.16
Plaid Cymru	Talat Zafar Chaudhri	174	24.10	−6.99
Labour	Gareth Stevan Kelly	95	13.16	+13.16
Green	Chris Simpson	40	5.54	+5.54
Majority		239	33.10	
Turnout		722		
Liberal Democrats hold		Swing		

=== Lampeter ward ===
Lampeter ward (two seats)
Party	Candidate	Votes	%	±%
Labour	Robert George (Hag) Harris*	737	81.71	
Independent	John Ivor Williams*	551	61.09	
Plaid Cymru	Elin Tracey Jones	270	29.93	
Majority		281	31.16	
Turnout		902		
Labour hold		Swing		
Independent hold		Swing		

=== Llanarth ward ===
Llanarth ward
Party	Candidate	Votes	%	±%
Plaid Cymru	Bryan Gareth Davies	Unopposed		
Majority				
Turnout				
Plaid Cymru hold		Swing		

=== Llanbadarn Fawr, Padarn ward ===
Llanbadarn Fawr, Padarn ward
Party	Candidate	Votes	%	±%
Plaid Cymru	Gareth Davies*	236	62.27	−17.52
Liberal Democrats	Juliet Price	143	37.73	+24.14
Majority		93	24.54	
Turnout		379		
Plaid Cymru hold		Swing		

=== Llanbadarn Fawr, Sulien ward ===
Llanbadarn Fawr, Sulien ward
Party	Candidate	Votes	%	±%
Plaid Cymru	Paul James*	267	70.63	−13.24
Liberal Democrats	Michael Chappell	58	15.34	+3.93
Labour	Wiliam Jac Rees	33	8.73	+8.73
Green	John Roy Morgan	20	5.29	+5.29
Majority		209	55.29	
Turnout		378		
Plaid Cymru hold		Swing		

=== Llandyfriog ward ===
Two candidates were nominated for this ward, Neil Flower (Liberal Democrat) and James Wyn Reynolds Thomas (Plaid Cymru). On 28 April 2017 it was announced that Neil Flower had died. Following normal convention the election in this ward was cancelled and a new election was due to be held on 8 June 2017. However, James Wyn Reynolds Thomas was elected County Councillor for the ward without a contest.

Llandyfriog ward
Party	Candidate	Votes	%	±%
Plaid Cymru	James Wyn Reynolds Thomas	Unopposed		
Majority				
Turnout				
Plaid Cymru hold		Swing		

=== Llandysiliogogo ward ===
Llandysiliogogo ward
Party	Candidate	Votes	%	±%
Independent	Gareth Lloyd*	Unopposed		
Majority				
Turnout				
Independent hold		Swing		

=== Llandysul Town ward ===
Here, Keith Evans regained the seat he lost four year previously.

Llandysul Town ward
Party	Candidate	Votes	%	±%
Independent	Evan John Keith Evans	407	63.30	+21.22
Plaid Cymru	Peter Godfrey Evans*	236	36.70	−21.22
Majority		171	26.60	
Turnout		643		
Independent gain from Plaid Cymru		Swing		

=== Llanfarian ward ===
Llanfarian ward
Party	Candidate	Votes	%	±%
Plaid Cymru	Alun Lloyd Jones*	Unopposed		
Plaid Cymru hold		Swing		

=== Llanfihangel Ystrad ward ===
Llanfihangel Ystrad ward
Party	Candidate	Votes	%	±%
Plaid Cymru	William Lynford Thomas*	510	59.23	−5.25
Liberal Democrats	Angela Lewes Gee	274	31.82	−3.7
Green	Elly Foster	77	8.94	+8.94
Majority		236	27.40	−1.55
Turnout		861		
Plaid Cymru hold		Swing		

=== Llangeitho ward ===
Llangeitho ward
Party	Candidate	Votes	%	±%
Independent	David Rhodri Wyn Evans*	534	71.39	+17.67
Independent	Margaret Eirwen James	132	17.65	+17.65
Labour	James Ralph Cook	82	10.99	+10.99
Majority		402	53.74	+36.92
Turnout		748		
Independent hold		Swing		

=== Llangybi ward ===
Llangybi ward
Party	Candidate	Votes	%	±%
Plaid Cymru	John Timothy Odwyn Davies*	402	69.91	−4.51
Labour	Dinah Mulholland	173	30.09	+30.09
Majority		229	39.82	−9.03
Turnout		575		
Plaid Cymru hold		Swing		

=== Llanrhystud ward ===
Llanrhystud ward
Party	Candidate	Votes	%	±%
Liberal Democrats	David Rowland Rees-Evans*	482	58.49	
Plaid Cymru	Hywel Llŷr Jenkins	140	16.99	
Labour	Tony Geraghty	118	14.32	
Independent	Alan Scott Durrant	49	5.95	
Green	John Raymond Crocker	35	4.25	
Majority		342	41.50	
Turnout		824		
Liberal Democrats hold		Swing		

=== Llansantffraed ward ===
Llansantffraed ward
Party	Candidate	Votes	%	±%
Independent	Dafydd Edwards*	795	77.71	
NHA	Harry Hayfield	228	22.29	
Majority		567	55.42	
Turnout		1,023		
Independent hold		Swing		

- Harry Hayfield was the Liberal Democrat candidate for this ward in the 2012 elections.

=== Llanwenog ward ===
Llanwenog ward
Party	Candidate	Votes	%	±%
Independent	Euros Davies*	unopposed	N/A	N/A
Independent hold		Swing		

=== Lledrod ward ===
Lledrod ward
Party	Candidate	Votes	%	±%
Independent	Ifan Lloyd Davies*	571	54.02	
Independent	Aaron Benjamin	325	30.75	
Plaid Cymru	Angharad Danielle Adrienne Shaw	161	15.23	
Majority		246	23.27	
Turnout		1,057		
Independent hold		Swing		

=== Melindwr ward ===
Melindwr ward
Party	Candidate	Votes	%	±%
Plaid Cymru	Daniel Rhodri Davies*	627	79.17	
Liberal Democrats	Gordon Patrick Walker	165	20.83	
Majority		462	58.34	
Turnout		792		
Plaid Cymru hold		Swing		

=== New Quay ward ===
New Quay ward
Party	Candidate	Votes	%	±%
Independent	Dan Potter	261	52.62	
Independent	Sarah Gillian Hopley*	205	41.33	
Conservative	Faith Louise Millward	30	6.05	
Majority		56	11.29	
Turnout		496		
Independent hold		Swing		

=== Penbryn ward ===
Penbryn ward
Party	Candidate	Votes	%	±%
Independent	Emyr Gwyn James*	691	71.61	
Plaid Cymru	Steffan Jenkins	274	28.39	
Majority		417	43.22	
Turnout		965		
Independent hold		Swing		

=== Penparc ward ===
Penparc ward
Party	Candidate	Votes	%	±%
Plaid Cymru	John Clive Davies	423	44.48	
Independent	Des Davies	265	27.87	
Liberal Democrats	Graham William Dixon	142	14.93	
Conservative	Nigel Sydney Moore	121	12.72	
Majority		158	16.61	
Turnout		951		
Plaid Cymru gain from Independent		Swing		

=== Tirymynach ward ===
Tirymynach ward
Party	Candidate	Votes	%	±%
Liberal Democrats	Paul Hinge*	468	56.18	
Plaid Cymru	Richard Michael Lucas	365	43.82	
Majority		103	12.36	
Turnout		833		
Liberal Democrats hold		Swing		

=== Trefeurig ward ===
Trefeurig ward
Party	Candidate	Votes	%	±%
Independent	David James Mason*	Unopposed	N/A	N/A
Independent hold		Swing		

=== Tregaron ward ===
Tregaron ward
Party	Candidate	Votes	%	±%
Plaid Cymru	Catherine Jane Hughes*	325	54.08	
Liberal Democrats	Karine Davies	276	45.92	
Majority		49	8.16	
Turnout		601		
Plaid Cymru hold		Swing		

=== Troedyraur ward ===
The winning candidate ran as an independent in 2012.

Troedyraur ward
Party	Candidate	Votes	%	±%
Plaid Cymru	Thomas Maldwyn Benjamin Lewis	Unopposed	N/A	N/A
Plaid Cymru gain from Independent		Swing		

=== Ystwyth ward ===
Ystwyth ward
Party	Candidate	Votes	%	±%
Liberal Democrats	John Edwin Meirion Davies	503	60.82	
Plaid Cymru	Mererid Jones	324	39.18	
Majority		179	21.64	
Turnout		827		
Liberal Democrats hold		Swing		

== By-elections 2017-2021 ==
=== Llanbadarn Fawr, Sulien ward (2019) ===
A by-election was held in this ward on 18 July 2019 following the death of Cllr. Paul James in a cycling accident. The result of the by-election was:

Llanbadarn Fawr, Sulien ward
Party	Candidate	Votes	%	±%
Plaid Cymru	Matthew Woolfall-Jones	186	63.27	−7.36
Liberal Democrats	Michael Chappell	93	31.63	+16.29
Labour	Richard Layton	15	5.10	−3.63
Majority		93	31.64	−23.66
Turnout		294		
Plaid Cymru hold		Swing	-11.83	
