= Saint Pyr =

6th century Welsh abbot who died after falling into a well

Pyr (Pŷr [pɨːr, piːr]; sometimes known as Piro in English) was a Welsh abbot of the 6th century who may later have been revered as a saint by some (though he was never canonised). Most of what is known of him comes from the First Life of St. Samson.

He has been described in one handbook as being "an unsuitable abbot and ... one of those Celtic 'saints' who would never have been canonized by any formal process", but there seems no evidence that he was ever considered as a saint by anybody. Little is known about him apart from the fact that he was the abbot of the monastery on Caldey Island (Welsh Ynys Bŷr "Pŷr's Island"). According to Gerald of Wales, "Pyrrus" was also the owner of the island, and of a castle in Wales.

Pyr is said to have become so drunk one night that on the way back to his cell he fell into a well. He died soon after being pulled out. He was replaced as abbot by Samson, who resigned in disgust when he found that the young monks had become ungovernable due to the laxity of Pyr's rule.
