= Cymidei Cymeinfoll =

Cymidei Cymeinfoll (possibly meaning pregnant in battle or big belly of battle in Welsh), is an Irish giantess mentioned in the Second Branch of the Mabinogi. Cymidei gave birth to one fully formed and armed warrior every six weeks.

She was the wife of Llasar Llaes Gyfnewid, smaller in size to her. Together, they lived under a lake in Ireland and were the keepers of the Cauldron of Regeneration, into which they would throw dead warriors, who would then come back to life mute.

Matholwch, king of Ireland in the tale, took the family in, but tired of them and ordered them thrown into an iron building which was then heated from the outside. Everyone died but Cymidei and Llasar, who escaped to Wales with the cauldron, which they gave to Bendigeidfran as a peace offering.

They are both mentioned as being guests at the wedding of Branwen, sister of Bendigeidfran, and Matholwch.
