= Tan-y-Bwlch, Aberystwyth =

Nature reserve in Wales

Coordinates: 52.39425°N 4.08243°W

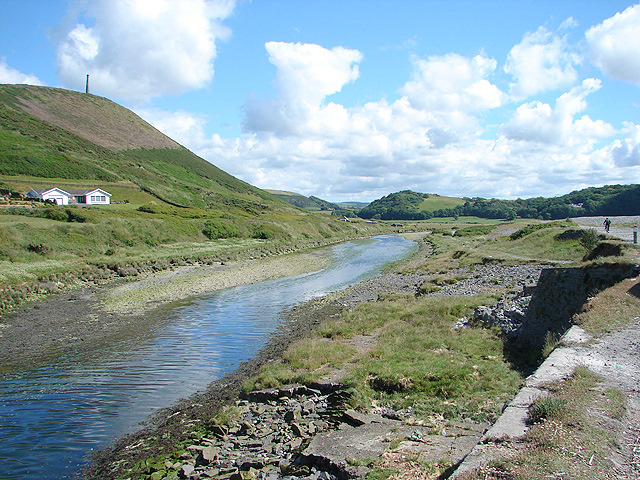
Afon Ystwyth. Looking upstream from just where the Ystwyth joins the Rheidol and then enters the sea. On the left is Pendinas Hill and on the right is Tanybwlch Beach

Tan-y-Bwlch (Welsh for 'Under the pass / gap') is a beach near Aberystwyth, Wales, forming part of the Pen Dinas and Tan-y-Bwlch Local Nature Reserve (LNR), the majority of which is located in the village of Penparcau. The area was designated in 1999 following a public meeting which attracted more than 100 local people. The 100-acre (0.40 km^{2}) site contains the Bronze Age burial mound and Iron Age Hillfort named Pen Dinas. The site is managed by Ceredigion County Council and is publicly owned, it is the largest Local nature reserve in the Dyfi Biosphere. The Wales Coastal Path runs along the top of the shingle beach. The beach is sometimes referred to as Penparcau Beach by locals in the area, the name is used on some mapping services.

In accordance with local legend, the valley directly east of the beach and to the fields directly south of Pen Dinas in the valley east of Tan-y-Bwlch is known as Maelorddin (City of Maelor) or more accurately Caerau Maelorddin meaning (Fields of the City of Maelor.
