= Sydney Northcote =

British musician, writer and editor

Sydney Northcote (1897–1968) was a British musician, writer, editor, composer, arranger, adjudicator and administrator. He was born in Deri, Bargoed, Glamorganshire, Wales, the son of an amateur musician and Welsh miner.

== Life ==
He attended Lewis School, Pengam and later studied at the Royal College of Music in London. He graduated with a bachelor of music at New college, Oxford, in 1923 and completed a doctorate in music in 1932.

For some twenty years he was Organist and Master of the Choristers at Heritage Crafts School in Chailey, Lewes, England; and from 1926 to 1941 he taught at the Guildhall School of Music and Drama in London. In 1941 he was appointed Music Advisor to the Carnegie United Kingdom Trust. He died at the age of 70 in Croydon, Surrey, England, on 16 May 1968. An obituary appeared in The Times.

As a writer on music, he championed the cause of the English composer C.W. Orr, and contributed articles to the 5th Edition of Grove's Dictionary of Music and Musicians (MacMillan, 1954). He wrote a number of books, including The Ballad in Music – Byrd to Britten (Norwood Editions, 1977), A Survey of English Song (Baker, 1966) and The Songs of Henri Duparc (Dobson, 1949). As an editor he was responsible for The New Imperial Edition of Solo Songs (Boosey and Hawkes, 1949) and jointly with E.T. Davies, Caneuon Cenedlaethol Cymru - National Songs of Wales (Boosey & Hawkes, 1959), contributing 43 of his own arrangements to this volume.

As an adjudicator, he regularly visited a number of countries, including Canada; in 1963 he adjudicated at the Winnipeg Music Festival, and in Lethbridge, Alberta; and for many years he was a popular adjudicator in Trinidad and Tobago. At the Trinidad Music Festival in 1950, he was impressed with the standard of performance of the young musicians whom he listened to, and dismayed at the lack of an adequate performance venue for them; together with Helen May Johnstone, President of the Trinidad Music Association, he began to lobby the British Government for improved facilities, and was influential in helping to raise funds for the project from the UK Carnegie Trust. As a result of these efforts, the Queen's Hall was opened in Port-of-Spain in 1959.
