= Pen Dinas =

Hill (128 m) in Ceredigion, Wales

Coordinates: 52.4016°N 4.0822°W

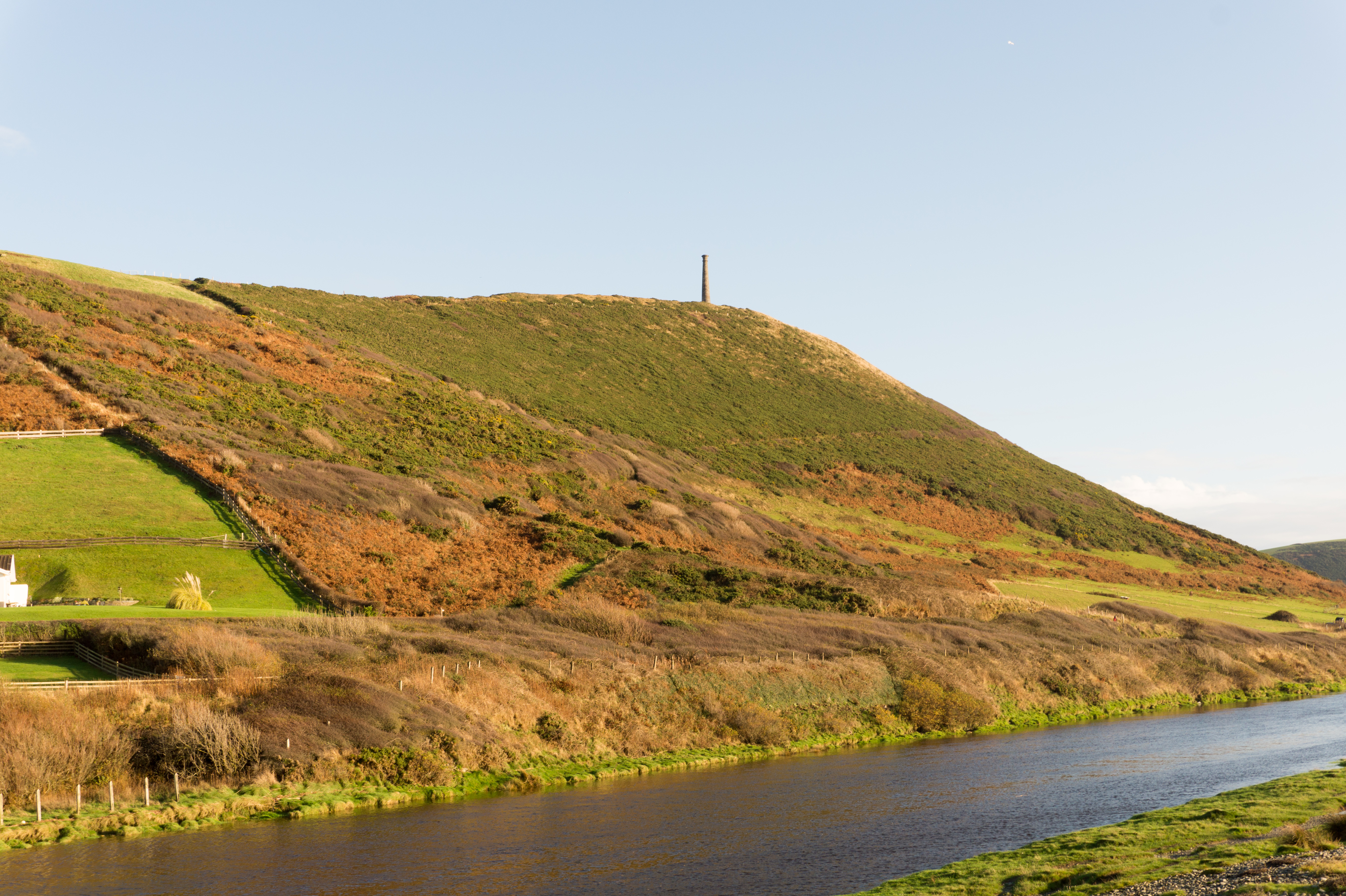
Pen Dinas and the Wellington Monument

Pen Dinas (Welsh pronunciation: [pɛn ˈdiːnas]) is a large hill in Penparcau, on the coast of Ceredigion, Wales, (just south of Aberystwyth) upon which an extensive Iron Age, Celtic hillfort is situated. The site can easily be reached on foot from Aberystwyth town centre and is accessible via a series of well marked trails. Boasting a commanding position at the confluence of the River Ystwyth and Afon Rheidol, it has been described as "the pre-eminent hillfort on the Cardigan Bay coast".

The name is more correctly 'Dinas Maelor', this could be translated into English as 'Maelor's Fort' or 'Maelor's City'. Tradition refers to it as being the fort of the giant Maelor Gawr. Pen Dinas strictly speaking only refers to the highest point, 'Pen y Dinas' or 'Head of the Citadel', (upon which the Wellington Monument now stands). The southern summit is also where, in the Bronze Age, a burial mound was erected.

The name Maelor survives in local legend and refers to the fields directly south of Pen Dinas in the valley east of Tan-y-Bwlch as Maelorddin (City of Maelor) or more accurately Caerau Maelorddin meaning (Fields of the City of Maelor.

There is a large stone monument dedicated to the Duke of Wellington which was built in the 1850s upon Pen Dinas overlooking Cardigan Bay and the town of Aberystwyth. The monument takes the form of an eighteen metre high upended cannon. It is thought that the column was intended to carry a statue at the top, which was never installed due to financial difficulties.

== Phases ==
The hillfort actually consists of two separate forts built many years apart, which were later combined to form a larger structure. The first fort to be constructed was on the lower northern summit. It consists of an outer ditch and inner rampart of rubble. It would originally have been surmounted by a wooden palisade. The main gateway is on the western side and is formed by a stone lined gap in the ditch and bank.

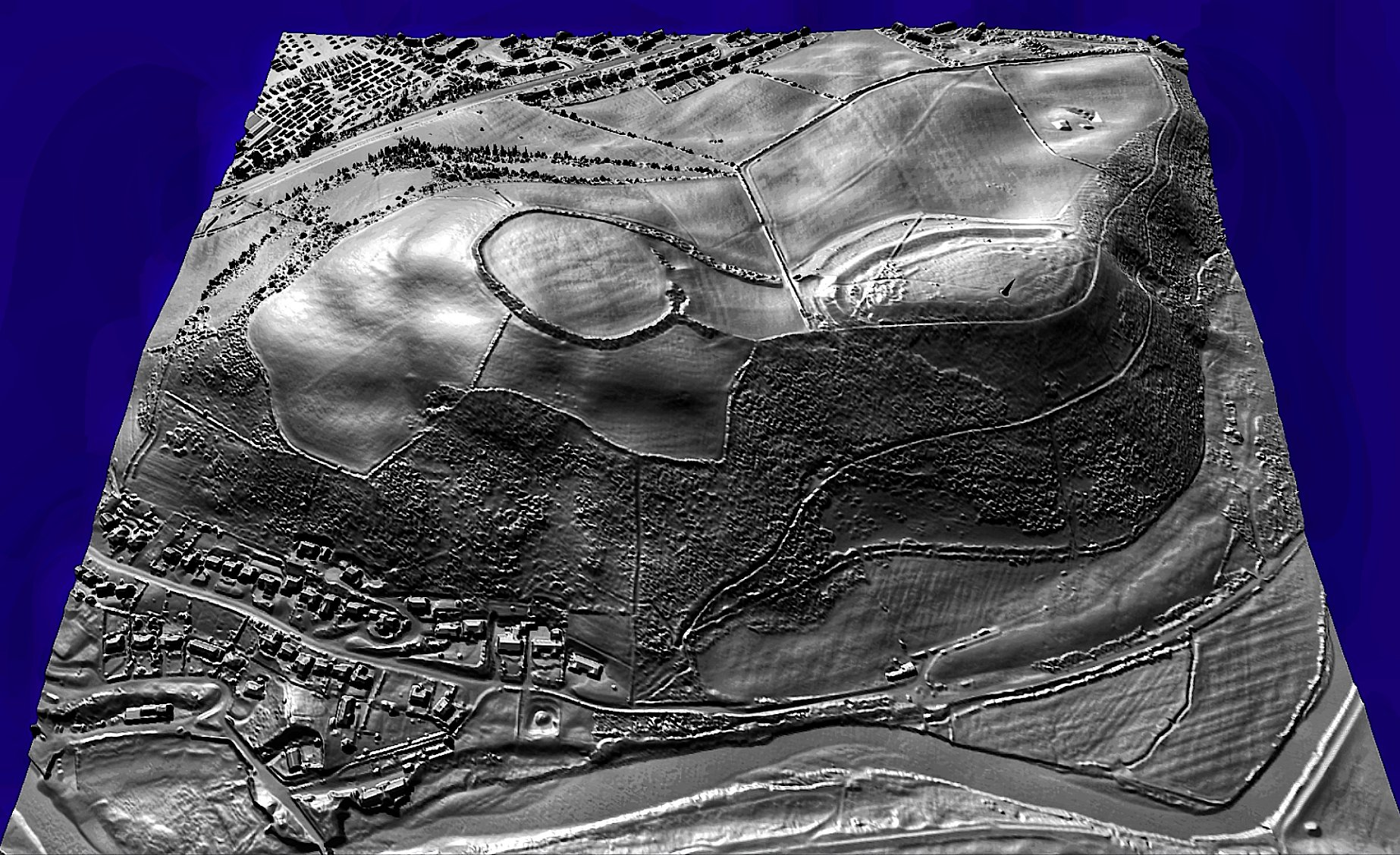
A lidar view of Pen Dinas.

After this first fort was eventually abandoned several decades passed before work began on a new fortification on the higher summit to the south. This second site is better protected by a steeper slope on the western side. To the south and east huge terraced earth works were built faced with shale which would again have been topped with a wooden palisade. Entrance into the southern fort is via gateways to the north and south. They are both formed of narrow passageways through the earthworks and would also have had timber bridges to cross the ditches. The northern gateway is kinked to the left, probably to aid defence by slowing down attackers.

Eventually the southern fort too became derelict and there is evidence that some of the wooden structures by the northern gateway were burnt. This could be following a hostile raid on the fort or because lack of resources lead to its abandonment. However, sometime later the defences of the southern fort were rebuilt this time to a different layout.

The final phase in the fort's construction was the refortification of the northern section and the construction of banks and ditches to connect the two forts together thereby enclosing the entire hill top. The coming of the Romans to the area in about 74 AD may have led to the forcible abandonment of the fort or it may have fallen from use before then but the only evidence from the Roman period is an early 4th-century coin hoard of Roman currency possibly left as an offering to a shrine on the hill.

Pen Dinas is one of many hillforts in the locality; Bow Street village and Hen Gaer hillfort lies 4 miles (6 km) to the north; Goginan 6 miles (10 km) to the east and Llanilar 4 miles (6 km) to the south. However, there are many features of this fort that are in common with hillforts from the Welsh Marches to the east and in contrast to some other Welsh hillforts. This may indicate that Pen Dinas was constructed by people moving into this area from the east at around 300 BC (Stanford, 1972).

Finds from Pen Dinas are sparse. Archaeological excavations, directed by Professor Daryll Forde between 1933 and 1937, found fragments of a pottery vessel of a type dating to about 100 BC, beads, loom weights and fragments of corroded iron and bronze. Further excavations were made in 2021 to raise the profile of the site and develop a management plan. In August 2022, further funding of almost £150,000 was received from the National Lottery Heritage Fund and Cadw for a two-year project to learn more about the hillfort.

== See also ==
- List of hillforts in Wales
- List of monuments to Arthur Wellesley, 1st Duke of Wellington
