= 2012 Ceredigion County Council election =

2012 Welsh local government election

- 3 May 2012

All 42 seats to Ceredigion County Council 22 seats needed for a majority
	First party	Second party
Leader	Ellen ap Gwynn	Keith Evans
Party	Plaid Cymru	Independent
Leader's seat	Ceulanamaesmawr	Llandysul Town (defeated)
Last election	19 seats, 43.8%	12 seats, 25.7%
Seats before	20	12
Seats won	19	15
Seat change	▼1	▲3
Popular vote	10,461	7,647
Percentage	39.2%	28.6%
Swing	▼4.6%	▼2.9%
	Third party	Fourth party
Leader	Ceredig Davies	Hag Harris
Party	Liberal Democrats	Labour
Leader's seat	Aberystwyth, Central	Lampeter
Last election	10 seats, 23.9%	1 seat, 3.2%
Seats before	9	1
Seats won	7	1
Seat change	▼2	0
Popular vote	6,787	844
Percentage	25.4%	3.2%
Swing	▲1.5%	0.0%
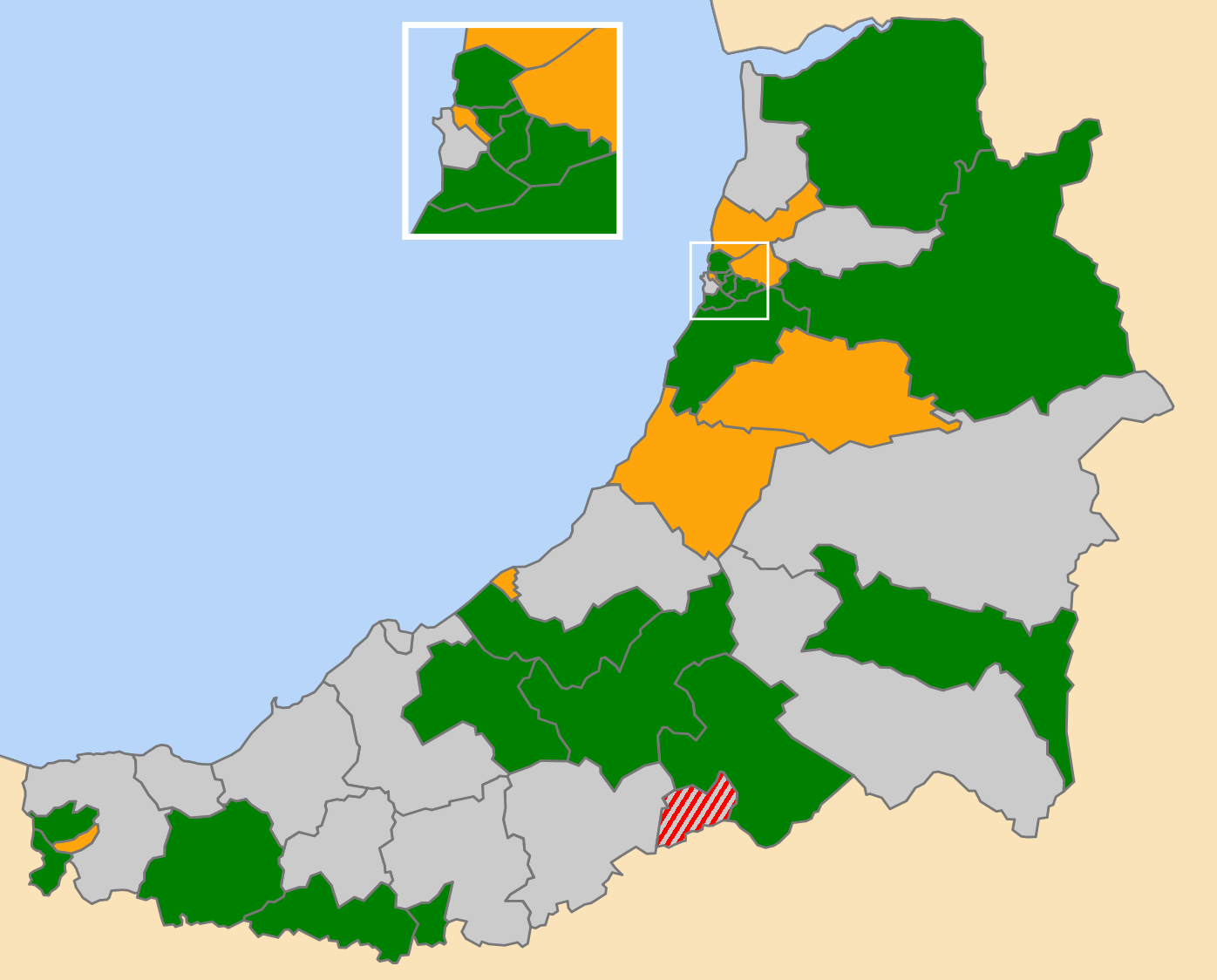
- Ceredigion local election results 2012
Council control before election
Keith Evans
Independent, Liberal Democrat & Labour coalition
Council control after election
Ellen ap Gwynn
Plaid Cymru, Independent & Labour coalition

The 2012 election to Ceredigion County Council was held on 3 May 2012 along with elections to 20 of the other 21 local authorities in Wales (all except Anglesey), community council elections in Wales and other elections elsewhere in the United Kingdom. It was followed by the 2017 election.

All 42 council seats were up for election. The previous council was controlled by Independents in coalition with the Liberal Democrat group and the single Labour member. Since 2008, there had been two by-elections in Aberystwyth, Rheidol and Ciliau Aeron which were both won by Plaid Cymru. The composition of the council prior to the elections was:

- Plaid Cymru 20
- Independents 12
- Liberal Democrats 9
- Labour 1

Councillors elected in this election were to serve an extended five-year term, after local government minister Carl Sargeant announced the next elections would be moved from 2016 to 2017 to avoid clashing with the next Welsh Assembly election in 2016 (which in turn had been delayed a year to avoid clashing with the next general election).

== Election results: overview ==
Ceredigion local election result 2012
Party	Seats	Gains	Losses	Net gain/loss	Seats %	Votes %	Votes	+/−
Plaid Cymru	19			0	45.2	39.15	10,461	-4.65
Independent	15			+3	35.7	28.62	7,647	+7.59
Liberal Democrats	7			-3	16.7	25.40	6,787	+1.54
Conservative	0			0	0.0	3.66	979	+0.73
Labour	1			0	2.4	3.16	884	+0.23
Green	-	-	-	-	-	-	-	-0.51
Total	42						26,718	

- The Independent statistics are for all Independents, whether they are members of the Independent group on the council or not.

Following the election, no party was left with a majority (22 seats) on the council. Plaid Cymru won a total of 19 seats, the Liberal Democrats won 7, Labour retained their single member, and the remaining seats were won by Independent candidates.

The leader of the Independent group on the council - Keith Evans - lost his seat to Plaid Cymru. As a result, Ray Quant (Councillor for Borth) was elected as the leader of a group of 12 of the independent councillors. Negotiations were held between the various groups, and eventually a coalition between Plaid Cymru, the one Labour councillor and a number of independent councillors was agreed upon. The Liberal Democrat group now form the opposition.

== Candidates ==
For a total of 42 seats, Plaid Cymru were fielding 34 candidates, the Liberal Democrats were fielding 28 candidates, 22 candidates were standing as Independents, the Conservatives were fielding 21 candidates, while Labour were fielding just one. The Green Party were not fielding any candidates in this election, compared to two candidates in 2008.

== Ward results ==
Asterisks denote incumbent Councillors seeking re-election. Vote share changes compared with corresponding 2008 election.

=== Aberaeron ward ===
Aberaeron ward
Party	Candidate	Votes	%	±%
Liberal Democrats	Elizabeth Evans*	651	91.30	+24.58
Plaid Cymru	Gwenllian Mair	62	8.70	+8.70
Majority		589	82.60	+49.37
Turnout		713		
Liberal Democrats hold		Swing		

=== Aberporth ward ===
Aberporth ward
Party	Candidate	Votes	%	±%
Independent	Gethin James*	500	61.27	−9.57
Plaid Cymru	Des Davies	218	26.72	+26.72
Conservative	Graham Howard Dean	98	12.01	−17.14
Majority		282	34.55	
Turnout		816		
Independent hold		Swing		

=== Aberystwyth, Bronglais ward ===
Aberystwyth, Bronglais ward
Party	Candidate	Votes	%	±%
Plaid Cymru	Alun John Wiliams*	405	89.40	+11.88
Conservative	Christopher Richard Owens Newcombe	48	10.60	+3.79
Majority		357	78.80	
Turnout		453		
Plaid Cymru hold		Swing		

=== Aberystwyth, Central ward ===
Aberystwyth, Central ward
Party	Candidate	Votes	%	±%
Liberal Democrats	Ceredig Wyn Davies*	231	62.43	−1.64
Plaid Cymru	Christopher MacKenzie Grieve	117	31.62	+0.89
Conservative	James Forrest	22	5.95	+0.75
Majority		114	30.81	
Turnout		370		
Liberal Democrats hold		Swing		

=== Aberystwyth, North ward ===
Aberystwyth, North ward
Party	Candidate	Votes	%	±%
Plaid Cymru	Mark Antony Strong	215	41.43	−3.02
Liberal Democrats	Edgar Carl Williams*	168	32.37	−16.13
Independent	Lisa Francis	107	20.62	+20.62
Conservative	Sophie Fuller	29	5.59	−1.47
Majority		47	9.06	
Turnout		519		
Plaid Cymru gain from Liberal Democrats		Swing		

=== Aberystwyth, Penparcau ward ===
Aberystwyth, Penparcau ward (2 seats)
Party	Candidate	Votes	%	±%
Plaid Cymru	Steve Davies	370	28.03	
Plaid Cymru	Lol Jones-Southgate	323	24.47	
Independent	Dylan Paul Lewis	247	18.71	
Liberal Democrats	Mair Benjamin	177	13.41	
Liberal Democrats	Brenda Haines	134	10.15	
Conservative	Mark William Mainwaring	53	4.02	
Conservative	Sophie Davies	16	1.21	
Majority				
Turnout		1,320		
Plaid Cymru gain from Independent		Swing		
Plaid Cymru hold		Swing		

=== Aberystwyth, Rheidol ward ===
Aberystwyth, Rheidol ward
Party	Candidate	Votes	%	±%
Independent	John Aled Davies*	207	32.91	+32.91
Plaid Cymru	Mark Endaf Edwards	143	22.73	−4.44
Liberal Democrats	Wendy Morris-Twiddy	137	21.78	−45.81
Independent	Martin Wyn Shewring	120	19.08	+19.08
Conservative	Harry Saville	22	3.50	−1.74
Majority		64	10.18	
Turnout		629		
Independent gain from Plaid Cymru		Swing		

- In 2008, Rheidol ward was won by the Liberal Democrats. It was then won by Aled Davies for Plaid Cymru in a by-election. Davies then left Plaid Cymru in 2012 to stand as an Independent candidate. The vote changes here compare this election to the 2008 election.

=== Beulah ward ===
Beulah ward
Party	Candidate	Votes	%	±%
Plaid Cymru	William David Lyndon Lloyd*	586	82.54	−2.54
Liberal Democrats	Steph Flower	85	11.97	−2.95
Conservative	Robert Hatfield	39	5.49	+5.49
Majority		501	70.57	
Turnout		710		
Plaid Cymru hold		Swing		

=== Borth ward ===
Borth ward
Party	Candidate	Votes	%	±%
Independent	Ray Quant*	358	49.58	−7.11
Independent	James Whitlock Davies	292	40.44	−2.86
Conservative	Shaun Bailey	72	9.97	+9.97
Majority		66	9.14	
Turnout		722		
Independent hold		Swing		

=== Capel Dewi ward ===
Capel Dewi ward
Party	Candidate	Votes	%	±%
Independent	Thomas Peter Lloyd Davies*	363	57.35	+57.35
Plaid Cymru	John Gethin Jones	270	42.65	+42.65
Majority		93	14.70	
Turnout		633		
Independent hold		Swing		

- In 2008, the election in Capel Dewi ward was won unopposed by Peter Davies.

=== Cardigan, Mwldan ward ===
Cardigan, Mwldan ward
Party	Candidate	Votes	%	±%
Plaid Cymru	Thomas John Adams-Lewis*	476	65.93	−1.23
Liberal Democrats	Neal Jones	200	27.70	+27.55
Conservative	Nigel Moore	50	6.93	+0.51
Majority		276	38.23	
Turnout		722		
Plaid Cymru hold		Swing		

=== Cardigan, Rhydyfwuch ward ===
Cardigan, Rhydyfuwch ward
Party	Candidate	Votes	%	±%
Liberal Democrats	Mark Cole*	320	75.83	−10.22
Plaid Cymru	Graham Evans	102	24.17	+10.22
Majority		218	51.66	
Turnout		422		
Liberal Democrats hold		Swing		

=== Cardigan, Teifi ward ===
Cardigan, Teifi ward
Party	Candidate	Votes	%	±%
Plaid Cymru	Catrin Miles*	163	63.42	+36.58
Liberal Democrats	Steve Greenhalgh	94	36.58	+6.04
Majority		69	26.84	
Turnout		257		
Plaid Cymru hold		Swing		

=== Ceulanamaesmawr ward ===
Ceulanamaesmawr ward
Party	Candidate	Votes	%	±%
Plaid Cymru	Ellen ap Gwynn*	469	61.71	−13.68
Liberal Democrats	Mark Allan Joseph	291	38.29	+13.68
Majority		178	23.42	
Turnout		760		
Plaid Cymru hold		Swing		

=== Ciliau Aeron ward ===
Ciliau Aeron ward
Party	Candidate	Votes	%	±%
Plaid Cymru	John Edward Charles Lumley*	405	50.63	−16.37
Liberal Democrats	Sonia Rose Williams	324	40.50	+21.9
Conservative	Lauren Evetts	71	8.88	+8.88
Majority		81	10.13	
Turnout		800		
Plaid Cymru hold		Swing		

=== Faenor ward ===
Faenor ward
Party	Candidate	Votes	%	±%
Liberal Democrats	John Roberts*	515	65.36	−1.09
Plaid Cymru	Terry Lambden	245	31.09	+2.58
Conservative	David Goddard	28	3.55	−1.49
Majority		270	34.27	
Turnout		788		
Liberal Democrats hold		Swing		

=== Lampeter ward ===
Lampeter ward (2 seats)
Party	Candidate	Votes	%	±%
Labour	Robert George (Hag) Harris*	884	45.03	+7.76
Independent	John Ivor Williams*	637	32.48	+5.36
Plaid Cymru	Robert Phillips	262	13.36	+0.95
Liberal Democrats	Alex George Bashford	130	6.63	+0.83
Conservative	Reece Fox	49	2.5	−0.10
Majority				
Turnout		1962		
Labour hold		Swing		
Independent hold		Swing		

=== Llanarth ward ===
Llanarth ward
Party	Candidate	Votes	%	±%
Plaid Cymru	Bryan Gareth Davies	284	48.38	+48.38
Liberal Democrats	Thomas Eurfyl Evans*	251	42.76	+42.76
Conservative	Joan Joyce Thomas	52	8.86	+8.86
Majority		33	5.62	
Turnout		587		
Plaid Cymru gain from Liberal Democrats		Swing		

- In 2008, the election in Llanarth ward was won by the unopposed Liberal Democrat candidate.

=== Llanbadarn Fawr, Padarn ward ===
Llanbadarn Fawr, Padarn ward
Party	Candidate	Votes	%	±%
Plaid Cymru	Gareth Davies*	229	79.79	+17.79
Liberal Democrats	Linden Parker	39	13.59	+1.59
Conservative	Jessica Carr	19	6.62	+6.62
Majority		190	66.20	+30.2
Turnout		287	34.58	−20.52
Plaid Cymru hold		Swing		

=== Llanbadarn Fawr, Sulien ward ===
Llanbadarn Fawr, Sulien ward
Party	Candidate	Votes	%	±%
Plaid Cymru	Paul James*	338	83.87	+1.49
Liberal Democrats	John Thornton	46	11.41	−6.20
Conservative	Nathaniel Hayward	19	4.71	+4.71
Majority		292	72.46	
Turnout		403		
Plaid Cymru hold		Swing		

=== Llandyfriog ward ===
Llandyfriog ward
Party	Candidate	Votes	%	±%
Plaid Cymru	Benjamin Towyn Evans*	485	82.06	+6.05
Conservative	Jane Kelsey	106	17.94	+17.94
Majority		379	64.12	
Turnout		591		
Plaid Cymru hold		Swing		

=== Llandysiliogogo ward ===
Llandysiliogogo ward
Party	Candidate	Votes	%	±%
Independent	Gareth Lloyd*	735	91.65	+25.38
Conservative	William Evetts	67	8.35	+8.35
Majority		668	83.30	
Turnout		802		
Independent hold		Swing		

=== Llandysul Town ward ===
Llandysul Town ward
Party	Candidate	Votes	%	±%
Plaid Cymru	Peter Godfrey Evans	373	57.92	+21.04
Independent	Evan John Keith Evans*	271	42.08	−21.04
Majority		102	15.84	
Turnout		644		
Plaid Cymru gain from Independent		Swing		

=== Llanfarian ward ===
Llanfarian ward
Party	Candidate	Votes	%	±%
Plaid Cymru	Alun Lloyd Jones*	391	67.18	+11.64
Liberal Democrats	Sian Kingscott-Smith	164	28.18	−9.98
Conservative	Martin Fletcher	27	4.64	−1.67
Majority		227	39.00	
Turnout		582		
Plaid Cymru hold		Swing		

=== Llanfihangel Ystrad ward ===
Llanfihangel Ystrad ward
Party	Candidate	Votes	%	±%
Plaid Cymru	William Lynford Thomas	550	64.48	−1.12
Liberal Democrats	Angela Lewes-Gee	303	35.52	+1.12
Majority		247	28.96	
Turnout		853		
Plaid Cymru hold		Swing		

=== Llangeitho ward ===
Llangeitho ward
Party	Candidate	Votes	%	±%
Independent	David Rhodri Wyn Evans'	361	53.72	+53.72
Liberal Democrats	Mary Pearce	248	36.90	+36.90
Independent	Paul Adrian Davison	63	9.38	+9.38
Majority		113	16.82	
Turnout		672		
Independent gain from Plaid Cymru		Swing		

- In 2008, the election in Llangeitho ward was won by an unopposed Plaid Cymru candidate.

=== Llangybi ward ===
Llangybi ward
Party	Candidate	Votes	%	±%
Plaid Cymru	John Timothy Odwyn Davies*	419	74.42	+7.43
Liberal Democrats	Derek Wilson	144	25.58	−7.43
Majority		275	48.84	
Turnout		563		
Plaid Cymru hold		Swing		

=== Llanrhystud ward ===
Llanrhystud ward
Party	Candidate	Votes	%	±%
Liberal Democrats	David Rowland Rees-Evans*	504	75.34	+10.06
Independent	Alan Durrant	165	24.66	+24.66
Majority		339	50.68	
Turnout		669		
Liberal Democrats hold		Swing		

- The independent candidate in 2008 received 34.73% of the vote, giving an Independent vote change of -10.06%.

=== Llansantffraed ward ===
Llansantffraed ward
Party	Candidate	Votes	%	±%
Independent	Dafydd Edwards*	842	85.66	+33.97
Liberal Democrats	Harry Hayfield	141	14.34	+14.34
Majority		701	71.32	
Turnout		983		
Independent hold		Swing		

=== Llanwenog ward ===
Llanwenog ward
Party	Candidate	Votes	%	±%
Independent	Euros Davies	395	47.42	+47.42
Plaid Cymru	Geraint Davies	366	43.94	−41.49
Liberal Democrats	Kathy Bracy	72	8.64	−5.92
Majority		29	3.48	
Turnout		833		
Independent gain from Plaid Cymru		Swing		

=== Lledrod ward ===
Lledrod ward
Party	Candidate	Votes	%	±%
Independent	Ifan Davies*	0	0.00	−54.85
Majority		0	0.00	−9.69
Turnout		0	0.00	−56.03
Independent hold		Swing	-4.85	

=== Melindwr ward ===
Melindwr ward
Party	Candidate	Votes	%	±%
Plaid Cymru	Rhodri Davies*	601	70.21	+17.12
Liberal Democrats	Fred Williams	255	29.79	−17.12
Majority		346	40.42	
Turnout		856		
Plaid Cymru hold		Swing		

=== New Quay ward ===
New Quay ward
Party	Candidate	Votes	%	±%
Independent	Sarah Gillian Hopley*	249	61.03	−7.54
Conservative	Luke Evetts	159	38.97	+7.54
Majority		90	22.06	
Turnout		408		
Independent hold		Swing		

=== Penbryn ward ===
Penbryn ward
Party	Candidate	Votes	%	±%
Independent	Gwyn James	431	51.93	+51.93
Plaid Cymru	Ian ap Dewi*	318	38.31	−34.45
Liberal Democrats	Neil Flower	81	9.76	−17.47
Majority		113	13.62	
Turnout		830		
Independent gain from Plaid Cymru		Swing		

=== Penparc ward ===
Penparc ward
Party	Candidate	Votes	%	±%
Independent	Thomas Haydn Lewis*	584	68.87	−3.40
Plaid Cymru	Shân Williams	264	31.13	+3.40
Majority		320	37.74	
Turnout		848		
Independent hold		Swing		

=== Tirymynach ward ===
Tirmynach ward
Party	Candidate	Votes	%	±%
Liberal Democrats	Paul Hinge*	544	68.51	+17.69
Plaid Cymru	Jaci Taylor	250	31.49	−17.69
Majority		294	37.02	
Turnout		794		
Liberal Democrats hold		Swing		

=== Trefeurig ward ===
Trefeurig ward
Party	Candidate	Votes	%	±%
Independent	David James Mason	422	58.45	+58.45
Plaid Cymru	Dai Suter*	300	41.55	−27.46
Majority		122	16.90	
Turnout		722		
Independent gain from Plaid Cymru		Swing		

- The independent candidate in 2008 received 14.82% of the vote, giving an Independent vote change of +43.63%.

=== Tregaron ward ===
Tregaron ward
Party	Candidate	Votes	%	±%
Plaid Cymru	Catherine Jane Hughes	0	0.00	+/−0.00
Majority		0	0.00	+/−0.00
Turnout		0	0.00	+/−0.00
Plaid Cymru hold		Swing	+/-0.00	

- Catherine Hughes also won the election unopposed for Plaid Cymru in 2008.

=== Troedyraur ward ===
Troedyraur ward
Party	Candidate	Votes	%	±%
Independent	Thomas Maldwyn Benjamin Lewis	361	67.73	+67.73
Plaid Cymru	Gerwyn James	172	32.27	+3.89
Majority		189	35.46	
Turnout		533		
Independent hold		Swing		

- The independent candidate in 2008 received 71.62% of the vote, giving an Independent vote change of -3.89%.

=== Ystwyth ward ===
Ystwyth ward
Party	Candidate	Votes	%	±%
Liberal Democrats	John David Rowland Jones*	432	62.79	−3.37
Plaid Cymru	Mererid Jones	222	32.27	+7.71
Conservative		34	4.94	+4.94
Majority		210	30.52	
Turnout		688		
Liberal Democrats hold		Swing		
