= Penparcau =

Village in Ceredigion, Wales

Coordinates: 52.400862°N 4.071998°W

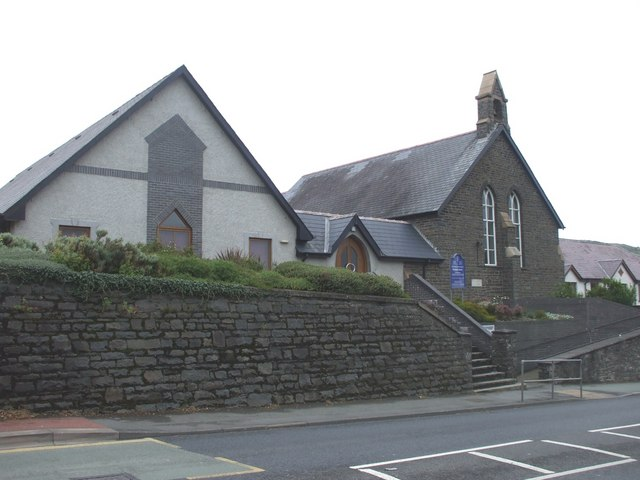
- St Anne's Church, Penparcau

- Location within Ceredigion
- Population: 3,122 (2011 census)
- OS grid reference: SN591801
- Principal area: Ceredigion
- Preserved county: Dyfed
- Country: Wales
- Sovereign state: United Kingdom
- Post town: ABERYSTWYTH
- Postcode district: SY23
- Dialling code: 01970
- Police: Dyfed-Powys
- Fire: Mid and West Wales
- Ambulance: Welsh
- UK Parliament: Ceredigion Preseli
- Senedd Cymru – Welsh Parliament: Ceredigion Penfro

Penparcau (Welsh pronunciation: [pɛnˈparkai̯]) is a village and electoral ward in Ceredigion, Wales, situated to the south of Aberystwyth.

The original village was a hamlet, but the building of extensive Art Deco style semi-detached social housing from the 1920s on transformed it. It lies in the shadow of the Celtic Iron Age hill fort of Pen Dinas, and between the sea at Tan Y Bwlch beach, the River Ystwyth and the Rheidol. Penparcau has the only UNESCO Biosphere reserve in the Dyfi Biosphere. A section of the Wales Coast Path runs over Tan y Bwlch beach.

There is an Anglican church named after the Saint Anne, a Roman Catholic church named after the Welsh Martyrs, which is noted in "Architecture of Wales, Carmarthenshire and Ceredigion" and is home to a Lampedusa Cross, as well as two Methodist chapels and a Quaker meeting house. The recently closed Tollgate pub was named after the original tollgate that stood on the old toll road at the top of Penparcau and is now in St Fagans National History Museum near Cardiff.

Penparcau has its own woodland, Coed Geufron run by the Woodland Trust and its own police station. Other amenities have included a post office, two supermarkets, a garage, holiday park and hotel and two fish and chip shops. Until late 2007, it also had its own travel agent.

In 2008, Penparcau played a part in the transition town movement in Wales when it hosted the "Alternative Energy and Transport Festival" in Neuadd Goffa, attended by the local MP and mayor. At the bottom of the valley, just below Penparcau, is a Welsh Government office building, designed to house more than 550 staff.

== Toponym ==
The name derives from the Welsh for "top of the fields" (Pen + parc(i)au). It is referred to as Pen y Parkiau in 1756, and variously in the 19th century as "Penparke", "Penparkey", "Pen Parciau" and "Pen-parcau".

== History ==
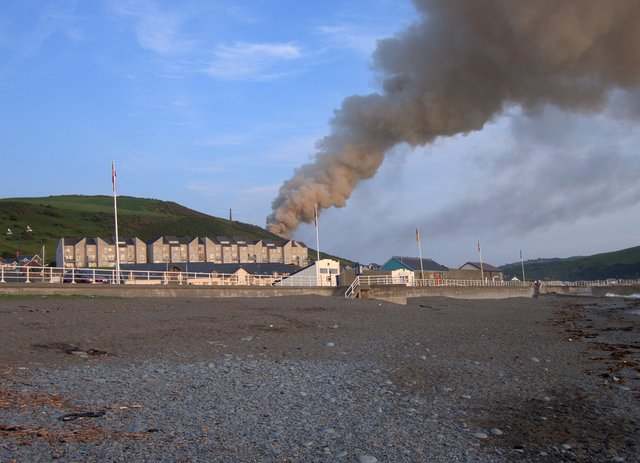
Grass fire on Pen Dinas behind Penparcau (2007)

People have lived in and around Penparcau for over two thousand years. The Iron Age hillfort is believed to have been occupied for some 300 years up to and including the first century BC. Pen Dinas is the largest Iron Age hillfort in Ceredigion. Estimated to have been first built around 400 BC, the outline of the ancient ramparts is still evident.

=== Mesolithic ===
There is evidence that during the Mesolithic Age the area of Tan-y-Bwlch at the foot of Pen Dinas (Penparcau) was used as a flint knapping floor for hunter-gatherers making weapons from flint that was deposited as the ice retreated.

==== Submerged Forest ====
To the south of Tan-y-Bwlch beach lies an area where during low tides a submerged forest can be clearly seen. This is thought to be between 4000 – 6000 years old. A record relating to the submerged forest can be found made by the Royal Commission on the Royal Commission on the Ancient and Historical Monuments of Wales.

=== Bronze and Iron Ages ===
The remains of a Celtic fortress on Pen Dinas (or more correctly 'Dinas Maelor' home of the mythical Celtic giant king Maelor Gawr), a hill in Penparcau overlooking Aberystwyth, indicates that the site was inhabited before 700 BC. On a hill south of the present town, across the River Ystwyth, are the remains of a medieval ringfort believed to be the castle from which Princess Nest was abducted. This rare survival is now on private land and can only be accessed by arrangement. A Bronze Age standing stone is also referenced as being in Penparcau in the Ceredigion County History (Volume 1) and the Dyfed Archaeological records.

=== Modern History ===
A distinctive memorial to the Duke of Wellington in the shape of an upturned cannon was built on the hilltop in 1852. The hilltop comprises a twin summit system and the mounded defences divide into three systems. Archaeological excavations in the 1930s demonstrated at least four phases to the defences. Pen Dinas is now more popular as a tourist attraction for walkers and used in a more sedate manner for paragliding.

Penparcau (pronounced in the local dialect as 'pen parky' or 'penpark'e with an emphasis on the e, as in the dialectical pronunciation of 'au' in North Ceredigion, where 'pethau' becomes 'pethe'(in Welsh)) in 1841 was spelled Penparke, Penparciau, Penparkie or even Pen Y Parciau (on the 1890 OS map) and stretched on both sides of the turnpike road from Trefechan to Southgate. The population of the hamlet was 239, most of whom were workers in agriculture and related rural industries. There were three agricultural labourers and only one farmer; the next most important occupation was that of stonemason of whom there were eight. There were three shoemakers, two tailors and two shipwrights as well as the following: rope-maker, joiner, tanner, carpenter, gardener, sawyer, wheelwright, weaver and saddler.

In the 18th century, smuggling was a key part of the economy, with tea, salt, rum and tobacco being some of the things smuggled into the local area. There are records in the national archive showing an extensive smuggling ring run by the Powell and neighbouring Stedman families. The smuggled goods were bought into Penparcau to avoid the excise men stationed in Aberystwyth.

There is also interesting domestic architecture that can be assigned to Richard Emrys Bonsall such as the Ebeneser Chapel, still in use today. The plans for many of these buildings can be found at the National Library of Wales.

A feature in Penparcau is the toll house. It was built in 1771 and stood at the southern junction of Penparcau (hence the name Southgate). It was built of local slate stone and was roofed with Pembrokeshire slates. David Jones of Dihewyd was appointed as the first gatekeeper in November 1771, and the first tolls were charged on 23 March 1772. The building contains just one room, one end being used for the collection of tolls. A single fireplace at the opposite end of the house was used for heating and cooking. At St Fagans the house has been furnished in the style of 1843, the period of the Rebecca Riots when many tollgates were destroyed in Wales. Turnpike Trusts were eventually abolished in 1864 with county councils taking over responsibility for building and maintaining the roads but the Penparcau toll house remained a residence until the 1960s.

== Culture ==
The United Kingdom Census 2001 reported that over 40% of the residents of Penparcau spoke Welsh and used Welsh daily, larger than any other individual census zone within that area, when compared to the other census data sets. In 2011 the village had the largest number of Welsh language speakers (1095) in the Aberystwyth town area, covering an area from the sea to the Rheidol.

== Notable residents ==
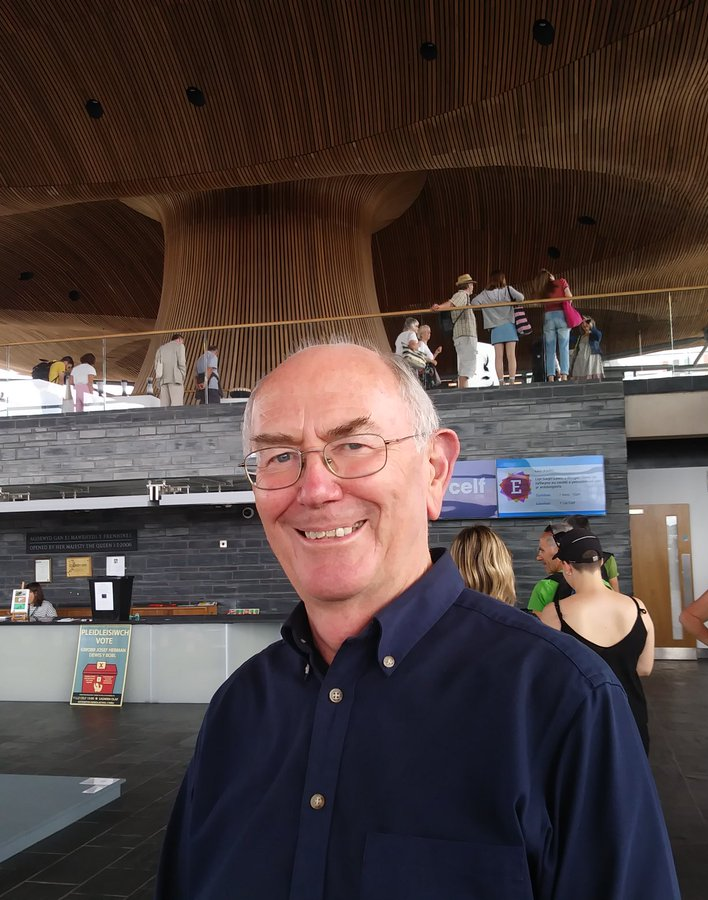
Eurfyl ap Gwilym, 2018

- David John de Lloyd (1883–1948), a Welsh composer and musician was raised and lived in the village.
- Tom Beynon (1886–1961), Presbyterian minister, author and historian.
- D. Gwenallt Jones (1899–1968), a Welsh poet, critic and scholar lived in the area; bardic name Gwenallt.
- Eurfyl ap Gwilym (born 1944), economist, politician and deputy chairman of the Principality Building Society
- Geraint H. Jenkins FBA, FLSW (1946–2025), historian of Wales and retired academic; born and raised in the village.
- Mike Jenkins (born 1953), author and poet; brought up in the village; father of Bethan Jenkins, politician
- Simon Thomas (born 1963), former politician, MP for Ceredigion from 2000 to 2005, lived locally
- Andy John (born 1964), former Bishop of Bangor, current Anglican Archbishop of Wales
- Jane Stanness (born ca. 1965) actress, writer, singer and songwriter.
- Ifan Morgan Jones, (born 1984) local resident won the Daniel Owen Memorial Prize for his novel at the National Eisteddfod in 2008.

== Governance ==
Aberystwyth-Penparcau is the most populous electoral division in Ceredigion and elects two county councillors.

Penparcau is also the name of the village which covers a portion of the electoral division consisting of the areas of Southgate and Caeffynnon.

Five town councillors represent the ward on the Aberystwyth Town Council, one of the 51 town and community councils in Ceredigion and consists of 19 town councillors elected in five wards. The last elections were held in May 2022.

Penparcau is governed by Ceredigion County Council and Aberystwyth itself elects six of the 42 councillors in five separate wards (Bronglais, Central, North, Rheidol and Penparcau - the Penparcau ward elects two of these). The two county councillors for Aberystwyth-Penparcau, elected in May 2022 were both Plaid Cymru.

Penparcau has five Senedd members, one of whom is elected as a constituency MS for Ceredigion, Elin Jones and four who are elected on the regional list for Mid and West Wales.

The village is also within the Ceredigion Preseli constituency for elections to the House of Commons. The current MP is Ben Lake for Plaid Cymru.

== Sites of Special Scientific Interest ==
The Penparcau electoral ward stretches from Tan y Bwlch beach to the Rheidol. There are two Sites of Special Scientific Interest and the Pen Dinas and Tan y Bwlch Local Nature Reserves within this area.

== Myth, folklore and legend ==
Legend has it that the Welsh Saint Samson of Dol (also Samsun; born c. late 5th century) was threshing corn in Penparcau on the hillside of Pen Dinas when the larger part of his flail broke and landed across the valley in the Abbey at Llanbadarn Fawr, in anger he threw the smaller part over the valley too and these were used to make the three celtic crosses which now stand in the church. One of the more unusual residents is the headless dog of Penparcau. The myth tells of how a giant, going to his father's rescue, rode at such a rate that his dog could not keep up with him and its head came off in the leash. The dog now roams, mournfully crying and looking for its long-lost owner.
