= Allman (surname) =

Allman (variants Alleman, Allmand) is an English surname from the Norman French aleman "German". In North American usage, the spelling Allman likely also stands in for the cognate Spanish name Aleman (to avoid the reading /eɪlmæn/ as in "ale-man").

Notable people with the surname include:

Allman

- Arthur Allman (1890–1956), English footballer
- B. M. Allman, American football coach
- Bob Allman (1914–1999), American football player
- Brendt Allman (born 1970), American musician
- Dan Allman (died 1921), IRA figure, killed during the Irish War of Independence
- Devon Allman (born 1975), American musician
- Dick Allman (1883–1943), English footballer
- Duane Allman (1946–1971), American rock guitarist, co-founder of The Allman Brothers Band
- Elijah Blue Allman (born 1976), son of Gregg Allman and Cher
- Elizabeth S. Allman, American mathematician
- Elvia Allman (1904–1992), American actress
- Eric Allman (born 1955), American computer programmer
- George Allman (disambiguation), multiple people
- Gregg Allman (1947–2017), American rock singer and musician, co-founder of The Allman Brothers Band
- Jamie Anne Allman, American actress
- Jared Allman (born 1984), American actor
- John Allman, American neuroscientist
- John Allman (poet) (born 1935), American poet
- Kyle Allman Jr. (born 1997), American basketball player
- Leslie Allman (1902–1979), English footballer
- Marshall Allman (born 1984), American actor
- Quinn Allman (born 1982), American guitarist
- Richard Allman (1813–1904), Irish businessman from Bandon, also MP for Bandon 1880–85.
- Robert Allman (1927–2013), Australian operatic singer
- Sheldon Allman (1924–2002), American-Canadian actor and singer
- Steve Allman (born 1968), Norwegian ice hockey player
- T. D. Allman (1944–2024), American freelance journalist
- Valarie Allman (born 1995), American track and field athlete
- William Allman (1776–1846), Irish botanist
- William G. Allman, American curator

Alleman

- John George Alleman (1804–1865), American Catholic missionary
- Andy Alleman (born 1983), American footballer
