= Allman =

Allman may refer to:

== Music ==
- The Allman Brothers Band, Rock and Roll Hall of Fame southern rock band, formed by Duane and Gregg Allman
- The Allman Joys, an early band formed by Duane and Gregg Allman
- The Gregg Allman Band

== People ==
- Allman (surname)

== Places ==
- Allman, Indiana, a town in the US
- William Allman Memorial Arena, an ice hockey arena in Stratford, Ontario, Canada

== Science and technology ==
- The Allman style, an indentation style

== See also ==
- Aleman (surname)
- Alman (surname)
