= 1978–79 in English football =

Football in England
- Season: 1978–79

Men's football
- First Division: Liverpool
- Second Division: Crystal Palace
- Third Division: Shrewsbury Town
- Fourth Division: Reading
- FA Cup: Arsenal
- Anglo-Scottish Cup: Burnley
- League Cup: Nottingham Forest
- Charity Shield: Nottingham Forest

The 1978–79 season was the 99th season of competitive football in England.

== Diary of the season ==
12 August 1978: League champions Nottingham Forest beat FA Cup holders Ipswich Town 5–0 in the Charity Shield at Wembley.

19 August 1978: The First Division season begins with newly promoted Tottenham Hotspur holding Nottingham Forest to a 1–1 draw at the City Ground – the visitors' goal scored by new Argentine signing Ricardo Villa.

31 August 1978: Liverpool, West Bromwich Albion and Everton are level on points at the top of the League at the end of August with three wins from three matches. Wolverhampton Wanderers are bottom after three consecutive defeats.

2 September 1978: Liverpool thrash Tottenham Hotspur 7–0 at Anfield to take their goal tally to sixteen in four League matches at the start of the season.

20 September 1978: England start their qualifying campaign for the 1980 European Championships with a narrow 4–3 victory over Denmark in Copenhagen.

27 September 1978: Nottingham Forest knock holders Liverpool out of the European Cup in the first round after completing a 2–0 aggregate success with a goalless draw at Anfield.

30 September 1978: Liverpool hold a two-point advantage at the top of the First Division from Merseyside rivals Everton, having dropped just one point from their first eight League games. Nottingham Forest are still unbeaten, but are five points off the pace having drawn six matches already. Birmingham City are bottom, still looking for their first win of the season.

21 October 1978: Liverpool continue their tremendous start to the season by beating Chelsea 2–0. The result puts them four points clear at the top of the table – they have taken 21 points from a possible 22, scoring 35 goals and conceding just four in eleven matches so far. West Bromwich Albion continue their good start to the season by thrashing Coventry City 7–1.

28 October 1978: Everton beat Liverpool for the first time for nearly seven years when Andy King scores the winning goal in a 1–0 victory at Goodison Park. The result cuts Liverpool's lead over the Toffeemen to two points. Like Everton, Nottingham Forest are still unbeaten, and are a further two points behind. At the bottom, Birmingham City remain without a win, and have just three points from twelve matches.

4 November 1978: Nottingham Forest and Everton draw 0–0 at the City Ground, leaving both teams still unbeaten in the League.

11 November 1978: Birmingham City record their first League win of the season at the fourteenth attempt, 5–1 at home to Manchester United.

29 November 1978: Viv Anderson, the 22-year-old Nottingham Forest defender, becomes England's first black full international when he appears in the 1–0 friendly win over Czechoslovakia at Wembley.

30 November 1978: At the end of November, Liverpool still hold a two-point lead over Everton, with West Bromwich Albion and Nottingham Forest a further four points adrift.

7 December 1978: Birmingham City sign 1978 World Cup-winning Argentinian player Alberto Tarantini for £295,000.

9 December 1978: Nottingham Forest lose in the League for the first time for 13 months, a run covering 42 matches, when they are beaten 2–0 by Liverpool at Anfield.

23 December 1978: Everton lose their first League match of the season, 3–2 to Coventry City, after a sequence of 19 unbeaten games. Arsenal beat Tottenham Hotspur 5–0 at White Hart Lane in the North London derby.

31 December 1978: At the end of the year, Liverpool lead Everton on goal difference at the top of the First Division, with a game in hand. West Bromwich Albion remain in contention, just two points off the top. Birmingham City are bottom with just eight points so far, and Chelsea and Wolverhampton Wanderers are also in the relegation zone.

7 January 1979: West Bromwich Albion pay a national record £516,000 for Middlesbrough forward David Mills.

10 January 1979: High-fliers Everton are beaten 2–1 by Second Division Sunderland in the FA Cup third round. Tottenham Hotspur are held to a 1–1 draw by non-league Altrincham.

22 January 1979: After four draws, the FA Cup third round tie between Arsenal and Third Division Sheffield Wednesday is finally resolved when the Gunners win the fourth replay 2–0.

31 January 1979: At the end of a month in which only twelve First Division matches were played, West Bromwich Albion and Everton have moved above Liverpool at the top of the table, although the Reds have played fewer games.

3 February 1979: Liverpool beat West Bromwich Albion 2–1 at Anfield to reclaim top spot in the First Division table as Everton suffer just their second League defeat of the season, 1–0 at relegation-threatened Wolverhampton Wanderers.

7 February 1979: England move to the top of their European Championship qualifying group with an emphatic 4–0 win over Northern Ireland at Wembley.

9 February 1979: Trevor Francis becomes Britain's first £1million footballer when he is transferred from Birmingham City to Nottingham Forest, doubling the British record fee set when West Bromwich Albion signed David Mills last month.

26 February 1979: Arsenal beat Nottingham Forest 1–0 at the City Ground in the FA Cup fifth round. Tottenham Hotspur, Liverpool, Manchester United and Ipswich Town are amongst the other First Division sides to progress.

28 February 1979: Liverpool at now five points clear of Arsenal and Everton at the top of the First Division, with two games in hand. Birmingham City are eight points from safety at the bottom, and are joined in the relegation zone by Chelsea and Queens Park Rangers.

3 March 1979: Chelsea débutant goalkeeper Petar Borota picks up a clean sheet against Liverpool, while Osvaldo Ardiles and David Mills score their first goals for their clubs: the Argentine internationalist bags a brace in Tottenham's 2–0 win over Derby County while Mills contributes to West Bromwich Albion's 3–1 win over Coventry City.

10 March 1979: Liverpool win 1–0 away to Ipswich Town to reach the FA Cup semi-finals. The two other ties played today end in 1–1 draws.

17 March 1979: Nottingham Forest retain the League Cup with a 3–2 win over Southampton in the final.

21 March 1979: Arsenal beat Southampton 2–0 in their FA Cup sixth round replay to join Liverpool, Wolverhampton Wanderers and Manchester United in the semi-finals.

31 March 1979: Arsenal beat Wolverhampton Wanderers 2–0 at Villa Park to reach the FA Cup final. In the other semi-final, Manchester United and Liverpool draw 2–2 at Maine Road. In the league, Liverpool hold a comfortable four-point lead over Everton at the top at the end of the month. Chelsea have slipped behind Birmingham City on goal difference at the bottom, and Queens Park Rangers remain in the relegation zone.

4 April 1979: Manchester United beat Liverpool 1–0 at Goodison Park in the FA Cup semi-final replay to reach the Final.

16 April 1979: Chelsea lose 5–2 away to Arsenal and are relegated to the Second Division.

21 April 1979: Birmingham City become the second team to be relegated from the First Division when they lose 2–0 at home to Nottingham Forest.

25 April 1979: Nottingham Forest reach the European Cup final at the first attempt when a 1–0 win away to West German side Cologne gives them a 4–3 aggregate victory.

28 April 1979: Liverpool move to the brink of regaining the First Division title after they draw 0–0 away to Nottingham Forest. They are seven points ahead of Forest and West Bromwich Albion.

4 May 1979: Queens Park Rangers take the last First Division relegation place when they are beaten 4–3 by Leeds United.

8 May 1979: Liverpool beat Aston Villa 3–0 at Anfield to clinch the First Division title. They finish unbeaten at home this season, and have scored 51 and conceded just four goals in 19 wins and two draws.

12 May 1979: Arsenal win the FA Cup to end an eight-year trophy drought, defeating Manchester United 3–2 in the final with a last-gasp goal by Alan Sunderland after United had scored two goals in the last five minutes.

18 May 1979: Nottingham Forest pip West Bromwich Albion to second place in the League by beating them 1–0 at The Hawthorns. Forest finish eight points behind champions Liverpool and one ahead of Albion, who are themselves eight points ahead of fourth-placed Everton.

26 May 1979: England beat Scotland 3–1 at Wembley to clinch the Home Championship.

30 May 1979: Nottingham Forest's remarkable run of glory continues when they beat Malmö of Sweden 1–0 in the European Cup final. Trevor Francis scores the only goal of the game.

1 June 1979: West Bromwich Albion sell winger Laurie Cunningham to Real Madrid of Spain for £995,000.

6 June 1979: England win 3–0 away to Bulgaria to move closer to next season's European Championship Finals.

== National teams ==
=== British Home Championship ===
Team	Pld	W	D	L	GF	GA	GD	Pts
England (C)	3	2	1	0	5	1	+4	5
Wales	3	1	2	0	4	1	+3	4
Scotland	3	1	0	2	2	6	−4	2
Northern Ireland	3	0	1	2	1	4	−3	1

Rules for classification: 1) points 2) goal difference. The points system worked as follows: 2 points for a win and 1 point for a draw.
Note: For the first time, goal difference was used to divide the teams, although it made no difference to the final outcome at this tournament.
(C) Champions

== UEFA competitions ==
Brian Clough's Nottingham Forest added the European Cup to their League Cup victory with a 1–0 win over Malmö of Sweden in the final. In UEFA Cup, West Bromwich Albion and Manchester City reached the quarter-finals. Arsenal were eliminated in the third round, and Everton in the second round.

== FA Cup ==
Arsenal won the FA Cup after surviving a late fight-back from Manchester United in the final at Wembley. Manchester United scored twice in the last five minutes to make the score 2–2, but a last-minute goal from Alan Sunderland saw Arsenal claim the trophy with a 3–2 scoreline. It was their first trophy success since Terry Neill replaced Bertie Mee as manager.

== League Cup ==
Nottingham Forest added the League Cup to their honours list, with a 3–2 victory over Southampton in the final.

== Football League ==
=== First Division ===
Bob Paisley won his third league title as his Liverpool side fought off competition from Nottingham Forest and West Bromwich Albion to finish eight points clear at the top of the table. Their final points tally of 68 was a record under the two points for a win system, and Ray Clemence kept 28 clean sheets in a season that saw Liverpool concede only four goals at home. Also, Liverpool became one of the first English clubs to have a shirt sponsor when they agreed a sponsorship deal with the Japanese hi-fi manufacturer Hitachi.

Defending champions Nottingham Forest finished second, but their amazing success story under Brian Clough continued as they won the European Cup and also retained the League Cup. In February 1979, they made history by signing Trevor Francis from Birmingham City in British football's first million-pound transfer. West Bromwich Albion finished third in their first full season under the management of Ron Atkinson. Everton and Leeds United completed the top five.

Arsenal, who finished seventh, compensated for a failure to challenge for the league title by winning the FA Cup, where they beat Manchester United 3–2 in a dramatic final where they had surrendered a 2–0 lead in the final few minutes before Alan Sunderland scored a last-gasp winner. It marked the end of a disappointing second season in charge for Dave Sexton, whose United team could only manage a ninth-place finish in the league.

New manager Danny Blanchflower was unable to save Chelsea from relegation to the Second Division, and with financial problems still affecting the West London club, midfielder Ray Wilkins was sold to Manchester United for £750,000. Birmingham City fared little better, finishing only two points ahead of Chelsea. QPR, who had declined since the departure of Dave Sexton in 1977, were the final relegated side, just three years after finishing second in the league; they had been comfortably mid-table at the turn of the year, but a disastrous second half of the season sent them down.

With 23 draws from 42 matches, Norwich City set a record that stands to this day for highest percentage of draws in an English Football League season.

Pos	Team	Pld	W	D	L	GF	GA	GD	Pts	Qualification or relegation
1	Liverpool (C)	42	30	8	4	85	16	+69	68	Qualification for the European Cup first round (Note: Nottingham Forest qualified for the European Cup first round as the 1978–79 European Cup winners.)
2	Nottingham Forest	42	21	18	3	61	26	+35	60	Qualification for the European Cup first round
3	West Bromwich Albion	42	24	11	7	72	35	+37	59	Qualification for the UEFA Cup first round
4	Everton	42	17	17	8	52	40	+12	51	Qualification for the UEFA Cup first round
5	Leeds United	42	18	14	10	70	52	+18	50	Qualification for the UEFA Cup first round
6	Ipswich Town	42	20	9	13	63	49	+14	49	Qualification for the UEFA Cup first round
7	Arsenal	42	17	14	11	61	48	+13	48	Qualification for the European Cup Winners' Cup first round (Note: Arsenal qualified for the European Cup Winners' Cup first round as the 1978–79 FA Cup winners.)
8	Aston Villa	42	15	16	11	59	49	+10	46	
9	Manchester United	42	15	15	12	60	63	−3	45	
10	Coventry City	42	14	16	12	58	68	−10	44	
11	Tottenham Hotspur	42	13	15	14	48	61	−13	41	
12	Middlesbrough	42	15	10	17	57	50	+7	40	
13	Bristol City	42	15	10	17	47	51	−4	40	
14	Southampton	42	12	16	14	47	53	−6	40	
15	Manchester City	42	13	13	16	58	56	+2	39	
16	Norwich City	42	7	23	12	51	57	−6	37	
17	Bolton Wanderers	42	12	11	19	54	75	−21	35	
18	Wolverhampton Wanderers	42	13	8	21	44	68	−24	34	
19	Derby County	42	10	11	21	44	71	−27	31	
20	Queens Park Rangers (R)	42	6	13	23	45	73	−28	25	Relegation to the Second Division
21	Birmingham City (R)	42	6	10	26	37	64	−27	22	Relegation to the Second Division
22	Chelsea (R)	42	5	10	27	44	92	−48	20	Relegation to the Second Division

Source: World Football
Rules for classification: 1) Points; 2) Goal difference; 3) Goals scored
(C) Champions; (R) Relegated

=== Second Division ===
Crystal Palace continued to excel under Terry Venables and finished the season as Second Division champions, with their promising young side being dubbed "the team of the eighties" by the sporting press, who expected them to challenge for honours at the highest level in the coming decade. Brighton and Stoke City were also promoted, while Sunderland missed out by a single point.

Blackburn Rovers, Millwall and Sheffield United went down to the Third Division.

Pos	Team	Pld	W	D	L	GF	GA	GD	Pts	Qualification or relegation
1	Crystal Palace (C, P)	42	19	19	4	51	24	+27	57	Promotion to the First Division
2	Brighton & Hove Albion (P)	42	23	10	9	72	39	+33	56	Promotion to the First Division
3	Stoke City (P)	42	20	16	6	58	31	+27	56	Promotion to the First Division
4	Sunderland	42	22	11	9	70	44	+26	55	
5	West Ham United	42	18	14	10	70	39	+31	50	
6	Notts County	42	14	16	12	48	60	−12	44	
7	Preston North End	42	12	18	12	59	57	+2	42	
8	Newcastle United	42	17	8	17	51	55	−4	42	
9	Cardiff City	42	16	10	16	56	70	−14	42	
10	Fulham	42	13	15	14	50	47	+3	41	
11	Orient	42	15	10	17	51	51	0	40	
12	Cambridge United	42	12	16	14	44	52	−8	40	
13	Burnley	42	14	12	16	51	62	−11	40	
14	Oldham Athletic	42	13	13	16	52	61	−9	39	
15	Wrexham	42	12	14	16	45	42	+3	38	Qualification for the Cup Winners' Cup first round
16	Bristol Rovers	42	14	10	18	48	60	−12	38	
17	Leicester City	42	10	17	15	43	52	−9	37	
18	Luton Town	42	13	10	19	60	57	+3	36	
19	Charlton Athletic	42	11	13	18	60	69	−9	35	
20	Sheffield United (R)	42	11	12	19	52	69	−17	34	Relegation to the Third Division
21	Millwall (R)	42	11	10	21	42	61	−19	32	Relegation to the Third Division
22	Blackburn Rovers (R)	42	10	10	22	41	72	−31	30	Relegation to the Third Division

Rules for classification: 1) Points; 2) Goal difference; 3) Goals scored
(C) Champions; (P) Promoted; (R) Relegated

=== Third Division ===
Graham Turner kicked off his managerial career by delivering the Third Division title to Shrewsbury Town, who reached the Second Division for the first time in their history. The other two promotion spots were occupied by newly promoted Watford and Swansea City, who within a few seasons would make their mark on the First Division.

Lincoln City, Tranmere Rovers, Walsall and Peterborough United all went down to the Fourth Division.

Pos	Team	Pld	W	D	L	GF	GA	GD	Pts	Promotion or relegation
1	Shrewsbury Town (C, P)	46	21	19	6	61	41	+20	61	Promotion to the Second Division
2	Watford (P)	46	24	12	10	83	52	+31	60	Promotion to the Second Division
3	Swansea City (P)	46	24	12	10	83	61	+22	60	Promotion to the Second Division
4	Gillingham	46	21	17	8	65	42	+23	59	
5	Swindon Town	46	25	7	14	74	52	+22	57	
6	Carlisle United	46	15	22	9	53	42	+11	52	
7	Colchester United	46	17	17	12	60	55	+5	51	
8	Hull City	46	19	11	16	66	61	+5	49	
9	Exeter City	46	17	15	14	61	56	+5	49	
10	Brentford	46	19	9	18	53	49	+4	47	
11	Oxford United	46	14	18	14	44	50	−6	46	
12	Blackpool	46	18	9	19	61	59	+2	45	
13	Southend United	46	15	15	16	51	49	+2	45	
14	Sheffield Wednesday	46	13	19	14	53	53	0	45	
15	Plymouth Argyle	46	15	14	17	67	68	−1	44	
16	Chester	46	14	16	16	57	61	−4	44	
17	Rotherham United	46	17	10	19	49	55	−6	44	
18	Mansfield Town	46	12	19	15	51	52	−1	43	
19	Bury	46	11	20	15	59	65	−6	42	
20	Chesterfield	46	13	14	19	51	65	−14	40	
21	Peterborough United (R)	46	11	14	21	44	63	−19	36	Relegation to the Fourth Division
22	Walsall (R)	46	10	12	24	56	71	−15	32	Relegation to the Fourth Division
23	Tranmere Rovers (R)	46	6	16	24	45	78	−33	28	Relegation to the Fourth Division
24	Lincoln City (R)	46	7	11	28	41	88	−47	25	Relegation to the Fourth Division

Source: rsssf.com
(C) Champions; (P) Promoted; (R) Relegated

=== Fourth Division ===
Reading, Grimsby Town, Wimbledon, and Barnsley occupied the Fourth Division promotion places. The success came for Wimbledon in only their second season as a league club and within a decade they would be an established First Division club. Wigan Athletic enjoyed a strong debut in the Football League by finishing sixth.

The re-election system voted in favour of the league's bottom four clubs and there was no relegation from the Fourth Division this season.

Pos	Team	Pld	W	D	L	GF	GA	GD	Pts	Promotion
1	Reading (C, P)	46	26	13	7	76	35	+41	65	Promotion to the Third Division
2	Grimsby Town (P)	46	26	9	11	82	49	+33	61	Promotion to the Third Division
3	Wimbledon (P)	46	25	11	10	78	46	+32	61	Promotion to the Third Division
4	Barnsley (P)	46	24	13	9	73	42	+31	61	Promotion to the Third Division
5	Aldershot	46	20	17	9	63	47	+16	57	
6	Wigan Athletic	46	21	13	12	63	48	+15	55	
7	Portsmouth	46	20	12	14	62	48	+14	52	
8	Newport County	46	21	10	15	66	55	+11	52	
9	Huddersfield Town	46	18	11	17	57	53	+4	47	
10	York City	46	18	11	17	51	55	−4	47	
11	Torquay United	46	19	8	19	58	65	−7	46	
12	Scunthorpe United	46	17	11	18	54	60	−6	45	
13	Hartlepool United	46	13	18	15	57	66	−9	44	
14	Hereford United	46	15	13	18	53	53	0	43	
15	Bradford City	46	17	9	20	62	68	−6	43	
16	Port Vale	46	14	14	18	57	70	−13	42	
17	Stockport County	46	14	12	20	58	60	−2	40	
18	Bournemouth	46	14	11	21	47	48	−1	39	
19	Northampton Town	46	15	9	22	64	76	−12	39	
20	Rochdale	46	15	9	22	47	64	−17	39	
21	Darlington	46	11	15	20	49	66	−17	37	Re-elected
22	Doncaster Rovers	46	13	11	22	50	73	−23	37	Re-elected
23	Halifax Town	46	9	8	29	39	72	−33	26	Re-elected
24	Crewe Alexandra	46	6	14	26	43	90	−47	26	Re-elected

(C) Champions; (P) Promoted

=== Top goalscorers ===
First Division

- Frank Worthington (Bolton Wanderers) – 24 goals

Second Division

- Pop Robson (West Ham United) – 24 goals

Third Division

- Ross Jenkins (Watford) – 29 goals

Fourth Division

- John Dungworth (Aldershot) – 26 goals

== Non-league football ==
The divisional champions of the major non-League competitions were:

Competition	Winners
Isthmian League	Barking
Northern Premier League	Mossley
Southern League	Worcester City
FA Trophy	Stafford Rangers
FA Vase	Billericay Town

== Star players ==
- Liam Brady was credited for his part in Arsenal's FA Cup triumph with the PFA Players' Player of the Year.
- Cyrille Regis played a major part in West Bromwich Albion's best league season for years and received the PFA Young Player of the Year award in recognition of his excellence.
- Kenny Dalglish was voted FWA Footballer of the Year for helping Liverpool win the First Division.

== Star managers ==
- Bob Paisley brought league championship glory to Liverpool.
- Brian Clough guided Nottingham Forest to a double triumph of the European Cup and League Cup.
- Terry Neill won his first major trophy as Arsenal manager in shape of the FA Cup.
- Ron Atkinson led West Bromwich Albion to third place in the League, just two places and nine points away from the top spot.
- Gordon Lee took Everton into the UEFA Cup after steering them to fourth place in the league.
- Terry Venables took Crystal Palace into the First Division as Second Division champions.
- Graham Turner took Shrewsbury Town into the Second Division for the first time by winning the Third Division title.
- Graham Taylor won his second promotion with Watford to bring them within one division of the top flight.
- John Toshack completed back-to-back promotions with Swansea City to take them into the Second Division.

== Famous debutants ==
1 January 1979 – Gary Lineker, English striker, makes his English league debut for Leicester City aged 18 in a 2–0 win over Oldham Athletic in a Second Division game at Filbert Street

28 April 1979 – Ian Rush, 17-year-old Welsh striker, makes his debut playing out of position (in midfield) for Chester in their 2–2 Third Division draw with Sheffield Wednesday at Sealand Road. On the same day, Clive Allen, 17-year-old striker, scores a hat-trick on his debut for Queens Park Rangers in the 5–1 First Division win over Coventry City.

30 April 1979 – Kevin Moran, Irish defender, makes his English league debut for Manchester United the day after his 23rd birthday in a 1–1 draw with Southampton in a First Division game at The Dell.

5 May 1979 – Mark Hateley, English striker, makes his English league debut for Coventry City aged 17 in a 3–0 win over Wolves in a First Division game at Highfield Road.

== Deaths ==
- 13 July 1978 – George Reader, 81, scored in his only appearance for Exeter City in their last season before joining the Football League in 1920, and then signed for Southampton, playing three league matches before dropping into non-League football to concentrate on his career as a school teacher before becoming a linesman in 1936 and being promoted to a referee in 1939. He refereed the decisive final group match of the 1950 World Cup between Uruguay and Brazil.
- 23 July 1978 – Tommy McLaren, 29, former Port Vale midfielder; committed suicide.
- 15 August 1978 – Dan Tremelling, 80, kept goal in 382 league games for Birmingham City between 1919 and 1932, then playing a further 57 league games for Bury before retiring in 1936. He won one England cap in 1927.
- 18 September 1978 – Bobby Finch, 30, who died of meningitis, played six league games for QPR in the late 1960s before moving to South Africa.
- 13 October 1978 – Bill Yates, 75, kept goal six times in the league for Bolton Wanderers and 47 times for Watford during the interwar years.
- 23 October 1978 – Vic Woodley, 68, kept goal in 252 league games for Chelsea during the 1930s, signing for Derby County in 1946 and completed his senior career with a further 30 league games for the East Midlanders. He was England's regular goalkeeper in the immediate pre-war era, being capped 19 times from 1937 to 1939.
- November 1978 – Hugh Neil, 42, former Carlisle United defender; died in a car accident.
- 8 November 1978 – Geoff Marlow, 63, was a left-winger for Lincoln City between 1937 and 1949, with the war restricting him to just 80 league appearances for the Sincil Bank side, scoring 26 goals.
- 14 November 1978 – Charlie Flood, 82, scored 68 league goals as a forward during the 1920s for Hull City, Bolton Wanderers, Nottingham Forest, York City and Swindon Town.
- 18 December 1978 – Cuthbert Coundon, 73, played 39 league games as a right-winger for Southampton and Wolverhampton Wanderers in the 1920s.
- 24 December 1978 – Stan Seymour, 83, served Newcastle United as a player, manager, vice-chairman and life president from 1920 until his death. He played in their FA Cup winning side of 1924 and league title winning side of 1927, and managed them to FA Cup glory in 1951 and 1952. As a player, he could play as a winger or striker, and managed 73 goals in 242 league games between 1920 and 1929.
- 20 January 1979 – Johnny Paul, 74, Scottish born winger, played 206 league games and scored 49 goals for Bristol City from 1922 until a knee injury ended his career in 1930.
- 21 March 1979 – Leslie Allman, 76, made his 15 Football League appearances as a goalkeeper for Norwich City in the late 1920s, spending the rest of his career at non-league level.
- 13 April 1979 – Fred Worrall, 68, was capped twice by England as a right-winger in the 1930s and was an FA Cup runner-up in 1934 and a winner in 1939 with Portsmouth.
- 31 May 1979 – Ernest Perry, 87, was with Port Vale as a centre-half when they joined the Football League during 1919–20 on taking over the fixtures of Leeds City, playing 44 league games for the Valiants, later playing 62 times in the league for Crewe Alexandra.
- 17 June 1979 – Sir Hubert Ashton, 81, was a full-back during the interwar years for West Bromwich Albion, Corinthian, Bristol Rovers and Orient. He was more famous as a cricketer and after retiring for sport he entered politics, serving Chelmsford in Essex as a Conservative MP from 1950 to 1964. He was knighted in 1959.
