= Andrew Graham (economist) =

British economist

Andrew Graham (born 20 June 1942) is a British political economist. From 2001 to 2011 he was master of Balliol College, Oxford. As of 2024 he is chair of trustees of the Europaeum (2024), a member of the Advisory Board of Ethics in Technology, Hamburg University of Technology (2023–), and senior fellow of the Oxford Internet Institute (OII) (2011–).

He is an honorary fellow of Balliol College and of St Edmund Hall, and an honorary doctor of Civil Law, awarded by the University of Oxford in 2003.

== Early life and education ==
Graham was born in Perranporth, Cornwall. He is the son of the novelist Winston Graham. He was educated at Truro Cathedral School and Charterhouse School before reading Philosophy, Politics and Economics (PPE) at St Edmund Hall, University of Oxford.

== Career ==
On graduation, Graham joined the National Economic Development Office (1964) followed by the Department of Economic Affairs (DEA) (1964–1966). From the DEA, he moved to No. 10 as economic assistant to Thomas Balogh (1966–1967), then economic adviser to the Cabinet, but de facto adviser to the Prime Minister, Harold Wilson. From 1968 to 1969, Graham was economic advisor to the Prime Minister.

Graham was appointed fellow and tutor in Economics at Balliol College, Oxford (1969–1997). From 1974 to 1976, on leave of absence from Balliol, he was a member of the No. 10 Policy Unit as economic advisor to the Prime Minister, Harold Wilson. In 1988 he became economic advisor to John Smith MP (Shadow Chancellor of the Exchequer and later Leader of the Labour Party), until Smith's death in 1994. During this time Graham was also consultant to the BBC (1989–1992), putting forward the case for public service broadcasting (PSB). Working initially with Gavyn Davies, he has continued to publish on this subject.

In 1997 Graham was appointed Acting Master of Balliol. He was subsequently elected Master of Balliol (2001–2011). He was an elected member of the University of Oxford Council (2006–2011). In 2001, Graham raised £15 million and founded the Oxford Internet Institute (OII), the first multidisciplinary research centre at a major university examining the effects of the internet on society. He was OII acting director (2001–2002) and chair of its advisory board (2002–2012). During his tenure as master, Balliol extended its fundraising (being the first college to raise £1 million from its annual fund), lowered its costs, improved its overall finances, and in 2010 set up the Balliol Interdisciplinary Institute. In 2008 Balliol obtained the most first class degrees in finals while the men's and, later, the women's rowers became Head of the River (men in 2008, women in 2010 and 2011). In 2011 the establishment of the Balliol Historic Collections Centre in the fully renovated St Cross Church was completed, aided by a donation of £1 million from the Shirley Foundation. He was acting warden of Rhodes House (2012–2013) and a Rhodes Foundation Scholarship Trust, trustee (2013–2016).

On 20 December 2024 Graham was appointed Chair of Trustees at the Europaeum (2024–), having previously served as its Chair of the Academic Council (2009–2020), Executive Chair (2017–2020), and Trustee (2020–2024). As part of restructuring, Graham created the Europaeum Scholars' Programme, securing agreement and raising external funding. Europaeum university membership rose from eleven in 2016 to seventeen by 2024. The regeneration of the Europaeum has been recognised by the award of the Scaliger medal by Leiden University (2021), and by the award of a gold medal by Charles University, Prague (2021).

== Other activities and appointments ==
- Member, International Labour Organization (ILO)/Jobs and Skills Programme for Africa (JASPA) Employment Advisory Mission to Ethiopia (1982)
- Member of the Media Advisory Committee to the Institute for Public Policy Research (IPPR) (1995–1997)
- Trustee of the Foundation for Information Policy Research (FIPR) (1997–2000)
- Board Member of Channel 4 television (1998–2005)
- Trustee of the Esmée Fairbairn Foundation (2003–2005)
- Director of Scott Trust Limited, owners of The Guardian (2005–2016)
- Consultant to Mammoth Screen for the BBC TV series, Poldark, based on the novels of his father, Winston Graham (2014–2022)
- Trustee of Reprieve (2015–2021)
- President of the Perranzabuloe Museum Trust (2015– )

== Published works ==
- Graham, Andrew; Davies, Gavyn (1997). Broadcasting, society and policy in the multimedia age (1 ed.). Luton: University of Luton Press. ISBN 9781860205507. OCLC 39075932.
- Graham, Andrew (November 1998). "3. Broadcasting Policy and the Digital Revolution". In Seaton, Jean (ed.). Politics and the Media: Harlots and Prerogatives at the Turn of the Millennium. Political Quarterly Monograph (1 ed.). Oxford: Blackwell Publishers. ISBN 978-0-631-20941-6. OCLC 645907475.
- Graham, Andrew (1999). "1. Broadcasting Policy in the Multimedia Age". Public Purposes in Broadcasting: Funding the BBC (1 ed.). Luton: University of Luton Press. pp. 17–46. ISBN 9781860205613. OCLC 42202304.
- Graham, Andrew (2000). "6. The Regulatory Challenge". e-brittania: the communications revolution. Luton: University of Luton Press. pp. 93–108. ISBN 9781860205767. OCLC 44561749.
- Graham, Andrew (1 September 2003). "The BBC is under siege - and with it democracy itself". Politics. The Guardian. London. eISSN 1756-3224. ISSN 0261-3077. OCLC 60623878. Archived from the original on 9 July 2022.
- Graham, Andrew (2005). "5. 'It's the ecology, stupid'". In Helm, Dieter (ed.). Can the Market Deliver?: Funding Public Service Television in the Digital Age. Eastleigh, Hampshire: John Libbey. pp. 78–100. ISBN 9780861966622. OCLC 58053369. OL 22717894M.
- Graham, Andrew (September 2013). "6. Is Broadcasting Just Another Good or Service?" (PDF). In Picard, Robert G; Siciliani, Paolo (eds.). Is there Still a Place for Public Service Television? Effects of the Changing Economics of Broadcasting (PDF) (Report) (1 ed.). Oxford: Reuters Institute for the Study of Journalism & BBC Trust. pp. 43–50. Archived (PDF) from the original on 28 June 2025.
- Graham, Andrew (2020). "With fake news increasing why kill a truth-teller?". In Mair, John; Bradshaw, Tom (eds.). Is the BBC in peril? : does it deserve to be? (1 ed.). London: Bite-Sized Books. ISBN 9798617963573. OCLC 1301247269. Archived from the original on 8 July 2025.

== Personal ==
Andrew is married to Peggotty Graham former Dean & Director of Social Sciences at the Open University, UK.

Academic offices
| Preceded by Colin Lucas | Master of Balliol College, Oxford; 2001–2011 | Succeeded by Drummond Bone |
