= Our Evenings =

2024 novel by Alan Hollinghurst

- First edition
- Author: Alan Hollinghurst
- Language: English
- Genre: Gay literature
- Published: 2024 (Picador Books)
- Publication place: UK
- Media type: Print (Hardback)
- Pages: 496 pp
- ISBN: 9781447208235

Our Evenings is a 2024 novel by Alan Hollinghurst. Written from the perspective of David "Dave" Win, a gay half-Burmese half-English actor, it details his life from his adolescence in the 1960s to his death.

== Plot ==
The book follows the life of David "Dave" Win from his adolescence in 1960s England to his death in contemporary times. Dave is mixed-race. His English mother, Avril, is a skilled dressmaker with her own business; Dave and Avril live together and are close. Dave's Burmese father is absent. Dave attends Bampton, a public school, on a scholarship funded by the wealthy Hadlow family. Although he is bullied by the Hadlows' son, Giles, the Hadlow parents, Mark and Cara, are kind to him. Dave visits the Hadlows at a farm owned by Cara's family. He is fascinated by the countryside and rehearses a scene with Mark's mother Elise, an elderly French actress.

One of Avril's clients, Esme Croft, a well-to-do divorcée, invests in Avril's business. The two women become close, and Esme joins Avril and Dave on a holiday to Devon, where Dave becomes increasingly aware of his attraction to men. Avril and Dave leave their apartment to move into Esme's home. Dave is ostracized at Bampton because of his race, relative lack of wealth, and Avril and Esme's relationship.

After Bampton, Dave attends the University of Oxford. He initially does well academically, and his performance as Mosca in a production of Volpone receives a positive review in The Times. However, he fails to complete his final exam, and his time at Oxford is marked by an awkward, unrequited crush on another student. Recuperating back home, Dave comes out to Avril and Esme.

Dave remains committed to acting and joins an experimental theatre company, which is eventually supported by the Hadlows. Dave dates Chris, a man ten years his senior, but during an intense rehearsal, Dave falls in love with Hector, a Black member of the theatre company. Dave breaks up with Chris and moves in with Hector. Both Dave and Hector experience racism, although Hector's experience of it is starker and more painful. They separate after Hector gets a role in a Hollywood film.

Dave develops into a skilled actor and speaker. He and Giles, now an increasingly successful and anti-immigrant conservative politician, reunite when both are invited to give talks at Bampton.

Esme dies of a stroke, and Dave supports Avril during the funeral. Giles is again present at a literary festival where he and Dave both promote books they have written; although Giles' book is more popular, Dave's interviewer, Richard, is sympathetic to Dave and interested in his career. Dave and Richard begin a relationship and eventually marry, and Richard supports Dave through the deaths of Mark and Avril.

Dave dies shortly after suffering grave injuries in a racially motivated attack during the COVID-19 pandemic. Richard edits Dave's memoirs, which become the novel itself.

== Title ==
At the end of the novel, David tells Richard that he intends to call his memoirs Our Evenings. David reveals, partly to Richard and partly to the reader, the many meanings the title has for him: the evenings David spent with other men when he was younger; the evenings David spends rehearsing and acting; and, finally, the evenings David and Richard spend together at home (Richard tells David, "I like evenings best").

The title is borrowed from the first movement of On an Overgrown Path by Leoš Janáček, which David listened to with a young schoolmaster at Bampton. The experience inspired David to devote himself to art.

== Reception ==
=== Style ===
Most reviewers of Our Evenings praise Hollinghurst's prose style, including his vivid descriptions of places and physical objects, his finely-tuned portrayals of social interactions, and his skillful use of irony, especially in the dialogue of David Win himself.

A typical description of Hollinghurst's use of language is provided by John Mair writing in the Sunday Times: "[A]t the sentence level, Hollinghurst remains an English stylist without obvious living equal." Similarly, Simon Schama, writing in the Financial Times, says, "I'm not sure any living writer is quite as good as taking you [into a particular scene] so immersively ..."

Moved by Hollinghurst's portrayal of the relationship between David and his mother, Megan Nolan in the New Statesman wrote that it can be "difficult to convey [such relationships] without sentimentality or a universalising blandness, but this is where Hollinghurst excels, remaining patiently and gladly in these moments as they unspool and the life around them becomes as real as our own."

=== Themes from earlier works ===
Reviewers note the continuity of themes in Our Evenings and earlier work by Hollinghurst. These include the experience of coming out in early and mid-twentieth century England; relationships, sexual and otherwise, between gay men of divergent backgrounds and ages; the transmission and transformation of gay modes of life; and, more generally, class, money and culture in English society, as experienced by Hollinghurst's gay protagonists.

In this vein, Alexandra Harris, writing in The Guardian, asserts that Our Evenings forms a "deep pattern of connection with ... [Hollinghurst's previous novels], while being an entirely distinct and brimming whole."

Francesca Peacock, on the other hand, writing for The Spectator, asserts that Hollinghurst's continued interest in what she calls "homosexual relationships" between "posh" and "non-posh" men results in a novel that is a "turgid composite of his previous works."

=== Race and politics ===
Reviewers uniformly note the importance of race in Our Evenings, more present in this novel than in Hollinghurst's previous works. Earlier scenes of sex between men of different races, told from the perspective of white protagonists, have been replaced with the portrayal of the whole life of a bi-racial man. Most reviewers find that Hollinghurst is successful in doing so, in particular in describing how Dave experiences, suffers from, and, with increasing skill, manages outsider status and outright racial animus.

Some reviewers object to what they perceive as a two-dimensional portrayal of Britain's evolving political scene, symbolized by Giles as school bully and jeering bigot turned Brexiteer villain. Other reviewers are more sympathetic, seeing such stark contrasts as an understandable literary response to recent events. Thus Charlie Tyson, writing for the Los Angeles Review of Books, identifies in the novel a "cry of pain against an England descending into bleak, stiff-jawed chauvinism."

=== Character development ===
A few reviewers find that some or all of the characters in Our Evenings lack depth. Sam Worley, writing in Vulture, suggests "young Dave doesn’t quite come alive," although he finds greater interest in the older Dave, when he "develops crushes, bombs a crucial college exam, and, accepting that his life’s path will be different than that of his boarding-school mates, joins an experimental theater troupe." Simon Schama also suggests to his readers that "when you close the book, you’re not going to miss [the characters of Our Evenings] that much."

Other reviewers are entirely positive: Hamilton Cain, writing in the New York Times, finds "Dave [to be] a captivating protagonist, threading narrative lines as Hollinghurst skewers the hidden and not-so-hidden bigotries that define Britain." Similarly, Michael Cart, writing for Booklist, finds Our Evening's characters to be "complex" and "multi-dimensional."

=== Structure of novel ===
Some reviewers note the episodic nature of the novel. Critical response to this varies. Simon Schama is disappointed by the lack of underlying structure and momentum. The author of a review in Kirkus Reviews, on the other hand, finds that the "expansive architecture of this book fluidly slips you from one phase of David's life to the next."
