= New Directions Publishing =

Independent book publishing company

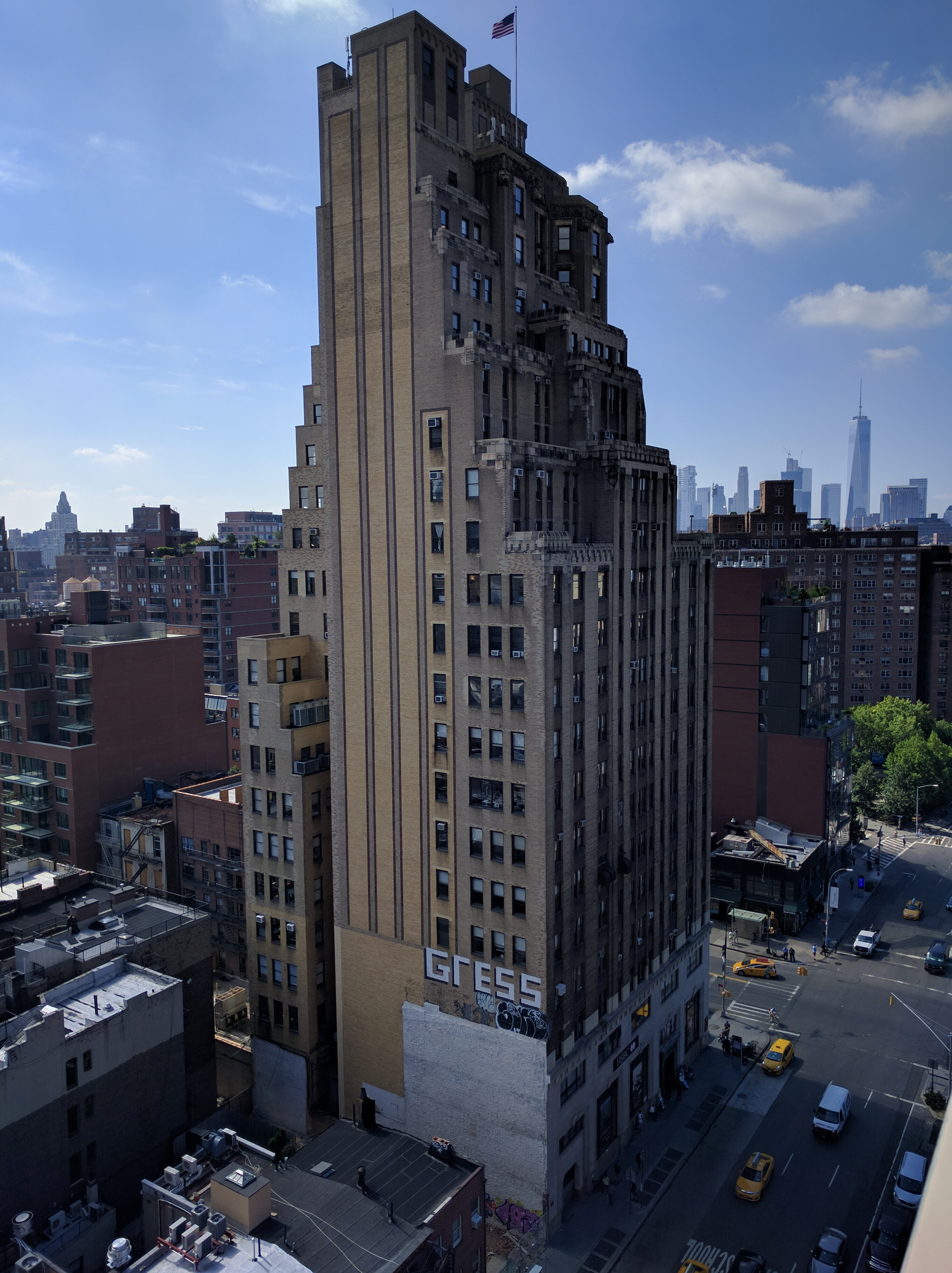
- 80 8th Avenue, headquarters of New Directions Publishing.
- Founded: 1936
- Founder: James Laughlin
- Country of origin: United States
- Headquarters location: New York City, U.S.
- Distribution: W. W. Norton & Company
- Publication types: Books
- Fiction genres: translation, experimental poetry
- Official website: ndbooks.com

New Directions Publishing Corp. is an independent book publishing company that was founded in 1936 by James Laughlin (1914–1997) and incorporated in 1964. Its offices are located at 80 Eighth Avenue in New York City.

== History ==
New Directions was born in 1936 of Ezra Pound's advice to the young James Laughlin, then a Harvard University sophomore, to "do something useful" after finishing his studies at Harvard. The first projects to come out of New Directions were anthologies of new writing, each titled New Directions in Poetry and Prose (until 1966's NDPP 19). Early writers incorporated in these anthologies include Dylan Thomas, Marianne Moore, Wallace Stevens, Thomas Merton, Denise Levertov, James Agee, and Lawrence Ferlinghetti.

New Directions later broadened their focus to include writing of all genres, representing not only American writing, but also a considerable amount of literature in translation from modernist authors around the world. New Directions also published the early work of many writers including Ezra Pound and William Carlos Williams, and Tennessee Williams was published as a poet for the first time in a New Directions poetry collection.

Laughlin also initiated a number of thematic series and publications. The New Directions "Poet of the Month" series consisted of thin volumes of either lengthy individual poems or small collections of poems by one author were released on a monthly basis to subscribers, and a larger "Poet of the Year" volume was issued once annually. The series were discontinued after a few years. "Directions" began in 1941 as a quarterly soft-bound journal, with each edition dedicated to a single author or work in prose. Early issues included a collection of short stories by Vladimir Nabokov and a play by William Carlos Williams. The subscription model did not take hold, and later editions in the series were published in more traditional form and sold as individual works to the general public. Another short-lived New Directions periodical, Pharos, was discontinued after its fourth number was published in the winter of 1947.

Other notable undertakings include the New Classics and Modern Readers series, which reissued recent books that had gone out of print. These reprints included such works as Exiles and Stephen Hero by James Joyce and The Great Gatsby by F. Scott Fitzgerald.

After Laughlin's death, New Directions Publishing became owned by a trust established in his will.

=== Jacket design and colophon ===
After the time of World War II, New Directions developed a close relationship with the artist Alvin Lustig, who designed modernist abstract book jackets. Lustig was ultimately responsible for developing a distinctive style of dust jacket that served as a New Directions hallmark for many years. Later Lustig's student at Black Mountain College, Ray Johnson, designed covers for several titles, including Rimbaud's Illuminations in 1957.

The company's colophon is a figure of a centaur based upon a sculpture by Heinz Henghes, and usually appears on the spine of New Directions books.

=== Presidents ===
- James Laughlin
- Griselda Ohannessian
- Peggy Fox
- Barbara Epler

=== Awards ===
In 1977, New Directions was presented with a Carey Thomas Award special citation for distinguished publishing in experimental literature. New Directions' authors have won numerous national and international awards, including the:

==== Nobel Prize ====
- Anne Carson, 2026
- László Krasznahorkai, 2025
- Tomas Tranströmer, 2011
- Octavio Paz, 1990
- Camilo José Cela, 1989
- Elias Canetti, 1981
- Eugenio Montale, 1975
- Pablo Neruda, 1971
- Yasunari Kawabata, 1968
- Jean-Paul Sartre, 1964
- Saint-John Perse, 1960
- Boris Pasternak, 1958
- Andre Gide, 1947
- Hermann Hesse, 1946
- Frédéric Mistral, 1904

==== Pulitzer Prize ====
- Hilton Als, 2017
- Gary Snyder, 1975
- George Oppen, 1969
- Richard Eberhart, 1966
- William Carlos Williams, 1963
- Tennessee Williams, 1948, 1955
- Robert Penn Warren, 1947, 1958, 1979

==== National Book Award ====
- Yoko Tawada, 2018
- Nathaniel Mackey, 2006

==== MacArthur Foundation Fellowship ====
- John Keene, 2018
- Peter Cole, 2007
- Lydia Davis, 2003
- Anne Carson, 2000
- Guy Davenport, 1990
- Allen Grossman, 1989
- Walter Abish, 1987

==== PEN/Faulkner Award for Fiction ====
- Toby Olson, 1983

==== Prix Goncourt ====
- Mathias Énard, 2015
- Eugène Guillevic, 1988
- Emile Ajar, 1975
- Romain Gary, 1956

==== Man Booker International Prize ====
- Laszlo Krasznahorkai / George Szirtes and Ottilie Mulzet, 2015

==== Independent Foreign Fiction Prize ====
- Jenny Erpenbeck / Susan Bernofsky, 2015

==== Lenore Marshall Poetry Prize ====
- Denise Levertov, 1976

==== Bollingen Prize in American Poetry ====
- Nathaniel Mackey, 2015
- Susan Howe, 2011
- Allen Grossman, 2009
- Robert Creeley, 1999
- Gary Snyder, 1997
- Robert Penn Warren, 1967
- Robert Fitzgerald, 1961
- Delmore Schwartz, 1960
- Ezra Pound, 1948

==== Robert Frost Medal ====
- Susan Howe, 2017
- Kamau Brathwaite, 2015
- Lawrence Ferlinghetti, 2003
- Denise Levertov, 1999
- James Laughlin, 1999
- Robert Creeley, 1987

==== Windham-Campbell Literature Prize ====
- John Keene, 2018
- Hilton Als, 2016

==== Vilenica Kristal Prize ====
- Luljeta Lleshanaku, 2009

== Current projects ==
The current focus of New Directions is threefold: discovering and introducing to the US contemporary international writers; publishing new and experimental American poetry and prose; and reissuing New Directions' classic titles in new editions.

Drawing from the tradition of the early anthologies and series, New Directions launched the Pearl series, which presents short works by New Directions writers in slim, minimalist volumes designed by Rodrigo Corral. Recent additions to the series include On Booze by F. Scott Fitzgerald and The Leviathan by Joseph Roth.^{[6]} New Directions also publishes a selection of academic reading guides to accompany a number of their books, including Hermann Hesse's Siddhartha and The Night of the Iguana by Tennessee Williams.^{[7]}

=== Authors ===
New Directions was the first American publisher of such notables as Vladimir Nabokov, Jorge Luis Borges, and Henry Miller. Today, their authors include:

American literature

- Walter Abish
- Will Alexander
- John Allman
- Sherwood Anderson
- Wayne Andrews
- David Antin
- Paul Auster
- Jimmy Santiago Baca
- Djuna Barnes
- Lee Bartlett
- Kay Boyle
- William Bronk
- Frederick Busch
- Hayden Carruth
- Tom Clark
- Peter Cole
- Cid Corman
- Gregory Corso
- Robert Creeley
- Guy Davenport
- Edward Dahlberg
- Helen DeWitt
- Debra Di Blasi
- H.D.
- Coleman Dowell
- Robert Duncan
- Richard Eberhart
- William Everson
- Lawrence Ferlinghetti
- Thalia Field
- F. Scott Fitzgerald
- Robert Fitzgerald
- Forrest Gander
- John Gardner
- Allen Grossman
- John Hawkes
- David Hinton
- Susan Howe
- Henry James
- Robinson Jeffers
- Mary Karr
- Bob Kaufman
- Alvin Levin
- Denise Levertov
- Nathaniel Mackey
- Bernadette Mayer
- Carole Maso
- Michael McClure
- Thomas Merton
- Joyce Carol Oates
- Charles Olson
- Toby Olson
- George Oppen
- Michael Palmer
- Kenneth Patchen
- Robert Plunket
- Ezra Pound
- Kenneth Rexroth
- William Saroyan
- Delmore Schwartz
- Frederic Tuten
- Rosmarie Waldrop
- Robert Penn Warren
- Eliot Weinberger
- Nathanael West
- Tennessee Williams
- William Carlos Williams
- Louis Zukofsky

Central American, South American, and Caribbean literature

- César Aira (Argentina)
- Martín Adán (Peru)
- Homero Aridjis (Mexico)
- Roberto Bolaño (Chile)
- Jorge Luis Borges (Argentina)
- Kamau Brathwaite (Barbados)
- Coral Bracho (México)
- Ernesto Cardenal (Nicaragua)
- Adolfo Bioy Casares (Argentina)
- Horacio Castellanos Moya (El Salvador)
- Julio Cortázar (Argentina)
- Felisberto Hernández (Uruguay)
- Vicente Huidobro (Chile)
- Enrique Lihn (Chile)
- Clarice Lispector (Brazil)
- Pablo Neruda (Chile)
- Nicanor Parra (Chile)
- Octavio Paz (Mexico)
- René Philoctète (Haiti)
- Rodrigo Rey Rosa (Guatemala)
- Guillermo Rosales (Cuba)
- Evelio Rosero (Colombia)
- Luis Fernando Verissimo (Brazil)

British, Irish, Canadian, and Australian literature

- Valentine Ackland
- Jessica Au
- H. E. Bates
- Martin Bax
- Carmel Bird
- Sir Thomas Browne
- Edwin Brock
- Christine Brooke-Rose
- Basil Bunting
- Elias Canetti
- Anne Carson
- Joyce Cary
- Douglas Cleverdon
- Maurice Collis
- William Empson
- Caradoc Evans
- Gavin Ewart
- Ronald Firbank
- Henry Green
- Christopher Isherwood
- James Joyce
- B. S. Johnson
- Hugh MacDiarmid
- Wilfred Owen
- Caradog Prichard
- Herbert Read
- Peter Dale Scott
- C. H. Sisson
- Stevie Smith
- Muriel Spark
- Dylan Thomas
- Charles Tomlinson
- D. H. Lawrence

European literature

- Germano Almeida (Cape Verde)
- Corrado Alvaro (Italy)
- Alfred Andersch (Germany)
- Guillaume Apollinaire (France)
- Gennadiy Aygi (Russia)
- Honoré de Balzac (France)
- Jacques Barzun (France)
- Charles Baudelaire (France)
- Gottfried Benn (Germany)
- Nina Berberova (Russia)
- Giuseppe Berto (Italy)
- Johannes Bobrowski (Germany)
- Wolfgang Borchert (Germany)
- Johan Borgen (Norway)
- Alain Bosquet (France)
- Mikhail Bulgakov (Russia)
- Louis-Ferdinand Céline (France)
- Blaise Cendrars (Switzerland)
- René Char (France)
- Inger Christensen (Denmark)
- Jean Cocteau (France)
- Alain Daniélou (France)
- Tibor Déry (Hungary)
- Eugénio de Andrade (Portugal)
- Pierre Choderlos de Laclos (France)
- Madame de La Fayette (France)
- Eça de Queiroz (Portugal)
- Tibor Déry (Hungary)
- Giuseppe Tomasi di Lampedusa (Italy)
- Édouard Dujardin (France)
- Jenny Erpenbeck (Germany)
- Hans Faverey (Netherlands)
- Gustave Flaubert (France)
- Romain Gary (France)
- Wilhelm Genazino (Germany)
- William Gerhardie (Russia)
- Goethe (Germany)
- Nikolai Gogol (Russia)
- Martin Grzimek (Germany)
- Henri Guigonnat (France)
- Eugène Guillevic (France)
- Lars Gustafsson (Sweden)
- Knut Hamsun (Norway)
- Hermann Hesse (Germany)
- Alfred Jarry (France)
- Franz Kafka (Germany/Czech Republic)
- Heinrich von Kleist (Germany)
- Alexander Kluge (Germany)
- László Krasznahorkai (Hungary)
- Dezső Kosztolányi (Hungary)
- Miroslav Krleža (Yugoslavia)
- Siegfried Lenz (Germany)
- Luljeta Lleshanaku (Albania)
- Federico García Lorca (Spain)
- Stéphane Mallarmé (France)
- Javier Marías (Spain)
- Henri Michaux (France)
- Frédéric Mistral (France)
- Eugenio Montale (Italy)
- Vladimir Nabokov (Russia)
- Boris Pasternak (Russia)
- Victor Pelevin (Russia)
- Saint-John Perse (France)
- Raymond Queneau (France)
- Rainer Maria Rilke (Germany)
- Arthur Rimbaud (France)
- Joseph Roth (Austria)
- W. G. Sebald (Germany)
- Jean-Paul Sartre (French)
- Dag Solstad (Norway)
- Stendhal (France)
- Antonio Tabucchi (Italy)
- Yoko Tawada (Japan/Germany)
- Uwe Timm (Germany)
- Leonid Tsypkin (Russia)
- Tomas Tranströmer (Sweden)
- Dubravka Ugrešić (Yugoslavia)
- Paul Valéry (France)
- Enrique Vila-Matas (Spain)
- Elio Vittorini (Italy)
- Robert Walser (Switzerland)
- Zinovy Zinik (Russia)

Chinese and Japanese literature

- Ah Cheng (China)
- Gu Cheng (China)
- Bei Dao (China)
- Osamu Dazai (Japan)
- Shūsaku Endō (Japan)
- Tu Fu (China)
- Takashi Hiraide (Japan)
- Taeko Kono (Japan)
- Yukio Mishima (Japan)
- Teru Miyamoto (Japan)
- Li Po (China)
- Li Qingzhao (China)
- Ihara Saikaku (Japan)
- Kazuko Shiraishi (Japan)
- Yoko Tawada (Japan/Germany)
- Yūko Tsushima (Japan)
- Wang Anyi (China)
- Wang Wei (China)
- Tian Wen (China)
- Mu Xin (China)
- Can Xue (China)
- Qian Zhongshu (China)

Southeast Asian literature

- Thuận (Vietnam)

Middle Eastern and Indian literature

- Ilango Adigal (India)
- Ahmed Ali(Pakistan)
- Buddha
- Albert Cossery (Egypt)
- Yoel Hoffmann (Israel)
- Qurratulain Hyder (India)
- Abdelfattah Kilito (Morocco)
- Dunya Mikhail (Iraq)
- Raja Rao (India)
- Aharon Shabtai (Israel)

== Bestsellers ==
- Labyrinths, Jorge Luis Borges
- A Coney Island of the Mind, Lawrence Ferlinghetti
- Siddhartha, Hermann Hesse
- Christie Malry's Own Double-Entry, B. S. Johnson
- Selected Poems, Denise Levertov
- The Air-Conditioned Nightmare, Henry Miller
- Nausea, Jean-Paul Sartre
- Turtle Island, Gary Snyder
- Miss Lonelyhearts & The Day of the Locust, Nathanael West
- The Glass Menagerie, Tennessee Williams
- Selected Poems, William Carlos Williams
- The Cantos, Ezra Pound
