= Sparsholt =

Sparsholt may refer to:

- Sparsholt, Hampshire
- Sparsholt, Oxfordshire

== See also ==
- The Sparsholt Affair, a 2017 novel by Alan Hollinghurst
