= Allemagne =

Allemagne is the French name for Germany.

It may also refer to:

== Communes in France ==
- Allemagne-en-Provence, in Alpes-de-Haute-Provence
- Fleury-sur-Orne (named Allemagne prior to 1917), in Calvados

== See also ==
- Aleman (surname)
