= Alemán =

Alemán may refer to:

- Alemán or Aleman (surname)
- Alemán (rapper) (born 1990), stage name of Mexican rapper Erick Raúl Alemán Ramírez
- Colegio y Liceo Alemán de Montevideo, German School of Montevideo, noted for its handball team
