= Valmouth =

1919 novel by Ronald Firbank

- First edition cover by Augustus John
- Author: Ronald Firbank
- Language: English
- Genre: Novel
- Publication date: 1919
- Publication place: United Kingdom
- Media type: Print

Valmouth is a 1919 novel by British author Ronald Firbank. Valmouth is an imaginary English spa resort that attracts centenarians owing to its famed pure air. The town's name evokes actual seaside towns in the southwest peninsula of Britain, such as Falmouth, Dartmouth, Teignmouth, Exmouth and Weymouth.

The novel's plot concerns, among other things, the effects of a black woman and her niece moving into a spa resort inhabited by wealthy centenarians. The ironic novel is about eroticism and exoticism in the milieu of quaint but lewd old British ladies at the fictional spa. The novel is noted for its florid and baroque style and parody-like humour, and its sexual innuendos both heterosexual and homosexual. There is also a fanciful brand of Catholicism, a blend of mortification of the flesh, high-flown mysticism, and proselytism.

In 1958, a musical adaptation was made by Sandy Wilson.

== Summary ==
Two wealthy elderly Valmouth-area ladies, Mrs Hurstpierpoint and Mrs Thoroughfare, are concerned with the marriage prospects of the latter's son, Captain Dick Thoroughfare. The Captain, away at sea, is rather scandalously engaged to a black girl, Niri-Esther, but he also favours his 'chum', Jack Whorwood.

Thetis Tooke, a local farmer's daughter, is obsessed with Captain Thoroughfare. Meanwhile, the exotic Mrs Yajñavalkya, a black masseuse and chiropodist, attempts to procure a sexual dalliance with Thetis' virile brother David for the centenarian Lady Parvula de Panzoust.

Eventually, Captain Thoroughfare returns to England. It comes to light that he has virtually married Niri-Esther, that they have a baby, and that she is also pregnant with his second child.

== Main characters ==
- Mrs Eulalia Hurstpierpoint, a dowager. She lives at Hare-Hatch House.
- Mrs Elizabeth Thoroughfare, another dowager, Mrs Hurstpierpoint's companion at Hare-Hatch House.
- Lady Parvula de Panzoust, a widow and friend of the Hare-Hatch dowagers; she is taken with the young farmer David Tooke.
- Mrs Yajñavalkya, a dark-skinned woman of Eastern birth, who is a ladies' masseuse and chiropodist.
- Niri-Esther, a dark-skinned young woman, niece of Mrs Yajñavalkya.
- Captain Dick Thoroughfare, Mrs Thoroughfare's son, away in Jamaica, who returns and has "married" Niri-Esther.
- Miss Thetis Tooke, a farmer's daughter, who is infatuated with Captain Thoroughfare.
- David Tooke, Thetis's brother, a farmer.
- Mrs Tooke, grandmother to Thetis and David, and a massage client of Yajñavalkya.
- Lieutenant Whorwood, an effeminate man who is Captain Dick Thoroughfare's 'chum'.
- Father Colley-Mahoney, a priest, who seems overly fond of male servants.

== Musical theatre adaptation ==
In 1958, a musical of the same name was adapted by Sandy Wilson from this and other Firbank stories. It opened at the Lyric Theatre Hammersmith, in London and made a name of Fenella Fielding as Lady Parvula de Panzoust. The musical has since been staged several times including twice at the Chichester Festival Theatre and several cast album recordings have been released. The musical has also been performed on BBC Radio, first broadcast in 1975.

== References to Valmouth in other works ==
- Protagonist William Beckwith reads Valmouth in Alan Hollinghurst's 1988 novel The Swimming Pool Library.
