= The Spell (novel) =

1998 novel by Alan Hollinghurst

- First edition
- Author: Alan Hollinghurst
- Language: English
- Publisher: Chatto & Windus
- Publication date: 2 Jul 1998
- Publication place: United Kingdom
- Pages: 257
- ISBN: 978-0-7011-6519-2
- OCLC: 40143016

The Spell is a 1998 novel by British author Alan Hollinghurst.

== Plot summary ==
Robin is doing research in the United States. He goes into a bar where he meets Sylvan, and calls Jane; she tells him she is pregnant with his baby.

The novel flashes forward to 1995 where the main protagonist, Alex, is visiting Justin, an ex-boyfriend, and his partner. He drives to their house in the country. Robin's son, Danny, is also there. After a flashback to Simon's (Robin's lover prior to Justin) AIDS related death, the plot goes back to Justin and Robin's cottage where the men are drinking and play with their young attractive neighbour Terry. Whilst driving Alex to see the local picturesque cliffs, Robin scares everyone by accelerating quickly and only stopping right before the cliff's edge. Later, Danny and Alex meet-up in Soho where they walk into Aubrey and Hector. It is clear that Danny knows many attractive gay men and slept with most of them. The two men go on to have dinner in a nice restaurant, followed by dancing at a club, where Alex is given his first pill of ecstasy by Danny. His desire quickly blurs as he is unsure if it is the drug or his attraction to Danny that allows him to kiss the younger man.

Justin is bored alone in his house. He calls Terry for casual sex. Later, Danny and his older friend George are driving to a party – Danny confesses to being bored with Alex. Alex and Hugh talk about Danny's lack of cultural knowledge and Alex's drug use. Later, Danny is organising a party and Alex wonders if he didn't perhaps waste his youth by not going to raves. Robin and George pick up their friends at the station. Danny's birthday party looks like a gay nightclub, as it is filled with attractive gay men doing drugs. Robin has a sexual encounter with Lars.

Danny gets a new job as a nocturnal security guard, to Alex's annoyance. He takes cocaine from a man he meets in the toilet and is caught with it. He then goes clubbing after he is fired. Later he returns home and Alex comes over; he tells him he wants to quit his job. Robin suggests Danny and Alex stay in Robin and Justin's cottage whilst they are separated. There, they make love in Robin and Justin's bed and take to going for walks. Alex explains how Justin's father died when they were away on holiday together, how this was the end of their relationship. Later, they take ecstasy.

Robin tells Tony he has had to let parts of his house for financial security. Later, he walks round the house looking back towards the past, and Terry pops in – they make love.

Justin is house-hunting with the aid of an attractive estate agent, Charles. Later in his hotel he has sex with Carlo, an escort. After seeing another house, he goes into a bar in Soho. Eventually he returns home and Robin is there; they play Scrabble together. Danny then goes to Dorset to see his father and his lover. They are hanging by the beach. Later at a party, whilst playing cricket, Danny says he is going to visit his mother in San Diego, to Alex's surprise. He then proceeds to break up with him. A little later, Alex, Nick, and Danny are off to visit a castle.

Alex craves the pleasures that Danny has introduced him to. He attempts to call a drug dealer to no avail but later walks into Lars on the street, who says he can get him anything he wants. The novel ends with Alex and his new, more stable boyfriend Nick standing at the cliff's edge, admiring the beauty of stopping before going over.

== Characters ==
- Robin Woodfield : An architect in his forties. He enjoys rugby and rowing.
- Justin : Robin's younger lover.
- Danny : Robin's twenty-two-year-old son.
- Alexander Nichols : Justin's ex-boyfriend. He works in the Foreign Office.
- Victor : The person who picks up Robin whilst he is hitchkihing in America.
- Sylvan : A man Robin meets in a bar.
- Janey : A woman Robin has had intercourse with, who is pregnant with his child.
- Simon : A late lover of Robin's.
- Terry Badgett : A friend of Justin's, who gets paid for casual sex.
- Tony Bowerchalke
- Mrs Bunce
- Aubrey : A friend of Dan's.
- Hector : A friend of Dan's.
- Hugh : A friend of Alex's.
- Dobbin : A friend of Dan's.
- George : A friend of Dan's, who takes cocaine.
- Lars : A Norwegian gay man.
- Margery Hall : A friend of Robin's.
- Mike Hall : A friend of Robin's. A retired bursar of a military college.
- Gordon
- Charles : An attractive estate agent.
- Carl : A local Dorset lad.
- Les : A local Dorset lad.
- Heinrich : A gay bartender.
- Adrian Ringrose
- Frederick : Hugh's Nigerian lover.

== Allusions to other works ==
- Other writers and works mentioned are : the anonymous lyric Fine Knacks for Ladies (from John Dowland's Second Book of Songs), Thomas Hardy's Tess of the d'Urbervilles and An Assignation – Old Style, Oscar Wilde, William Makepeace Thackeray's Vanity Fair, William Shakespeare's Hamlet and A Midsummer Night's Dream, Arthur Conan Doyle, Alfred Tennyson, Anthony Trollope, Algernon Charles Swinburne.
- The visual arts mentioned are : Frank Lloyd Wright, Quinlan Terry, Bernard Leach.
- The music mentioned is : Giuseppe Verdi's La traviata, Let's Hear It for the Boy, Robert Schumann, George Frideric Handel, Joseph Haydn, Joe Puma, Ralph Vaughan Williams, John Barbirolli, Girolamo Frescobaldi, Frédéric Chopin, the Beatles, the Rolling Stones, The Doors, the Incredible String Band, The Kinks, Gustav Mahler, Ludwig van Beethoven, Van Morrison, ABBA, Wolfgang Amadeus Mozart, Madonna's "Bedtime Story".
