= Aleman (surname) =

Aleman (Alleman, Allman and variants) is a surname with origins in the Romance language speaking parts of Western Europe, derived from the name for Germany derived from the name of the Alamanni (the Frankish duchy of Alamannia), French Allemagne, Spanish Alemania, etc. The surname is thus a toponymic surname, and would originally have been given to a person of German origin in a Romance speaking area.

Variants of the surname include English (from Norman French) Allman, Alleman, French Allemand, Spanish Aleman (Alemán), among others. Alman can be a variant of Allman, Alleman, but also of unrelated Swedish or German Ahl(e)mann or Jewish Almen. but another variant of this surname was changed when it arrived in the Philippines which is Aliman.

== People with this surname ==
Aleman, Alemán, Aliman

- Alberto Aleman (b. c. 1951) Panamanian director of the Panama Canal
- Allan Alemán (b. 1983), Costa Rican footballer
- André Aleman (b. 1975), Dutch neuroscientist
- Armando Alemán (1904–1995), Spanish Olympic fencer
- Arnoldo Alemán (b. 1946), Nicaraguan politician, president of Nicaragua from 1997 to 2002
- Consuelo Villalon Aleman (1907–1998), Mexican pianist
- Eulalio Ríos Alemán (c. 1930–c. 1980), Mexican Olympic swimmer
- Fedora Alemán (1912–2018), Venezuelan operatic soprano
- Franco Alemán (born 2000), Cuban baseball player
- Gabriela Alemán (born 1968), Ecuadorian writer
- Gabriela Alemán (illustrator) (born c. 1995), American illustrator
- Garnier l'Aleman (died after 1231), German Crusader, also known as Werner of Egisheim
- Gonzalo Alemán Migliolo (born 1954), Mexican politician
- Hernán Alemán (politician) (1955–2020), Venezuelan politician, also known as Claret Alemán Pérez
- Harry "The Hook" Aleman (1939–2010), American mobster
- Hugh l'Aleman (died before 1241), nobleman of the Kingdom of Jerusalem
- Hugh l'Aleman (died 1264), knight of the Kingdom of Jerusalem and heir to the Lordship of Caesarea
- Jaime Aleman Healy (born 1953), Panamanian lawyer, businessman and diplomat
- John Aleman (died after 1264), the Lord of Caesarea (as John II) in the Kingdom of Jerusalem
- José Braulio Alemán (1864–1930), Cuban Brigadier General
- José Miguel Alemán (b. 1956), Panamanian politician
- Juan Carlos Alemán Soto (b. 1966), Guatemala's Minister of National Defence
- Julio Alemán (1933–2012), Mexican actor
- Laura Alemán, Puerto Rican actress and singer
- Louis Aleman (1390–1450), French cardinal
- Lucas Alamán (1792–1853), Mexican historian and politician
- Mateo Alemán (1547–c. 1610), Spanish novelist
- Miguel Alemán González (1884–1929), Mexican general
- Miguel Alemán Valdés (1902–1983), Mexican politician, president of Mexico from 1946 to 1952
- Miguel Alemán Velasco (b. 1932), Mexican politician, governor of Veracruz from 1998 to 2004
- Miguel Alemán (1906–1979), Cuban chess master
- Nauzet Alemán (b. 1985), Spanish footballer
- Oscar Alemán (1909–1980), Argentine jazz guitarist
- René Aleman (1913–1989), French weightlifter

Alman

Allman

other

- Ellen Alemany, American CEO of Citizens Financial Group
- Jean Allemand (1799–1833), French Catholic priest and Orientalist
- Joseph Sadoc Alemany (1814–1888), O.P., Catalan American archbishop.
- Serafino Allemano, Italian entrepreneur, founder of Carrozzeria Allemano
