= The Swimming-Pool Library =

1988 novel by Alan Hollinghurst

- First edition
- Author: Alan Hollinghurst
- Language: English
- Publisher: Chatto & Windus
- Publication date: 22 Feb 1988
- Publication place: United Kingdom
- Media type: Print (hardback & paperback) & audio book
- Pages: 304
- ISBN: 0-7011-3282-5
- OCLC: 17841394

The Swimming-Pool Library is a 1988 novel by Alan Hollinghurst. The novel won two awards including Somerset Maugham Award 1988 followed by American Academy of Arts and Letters E.M. Forster Award 1989.

== Plot introduction ==
In 1983 London, Will, a privileged, gay, sexually irresistible 25-year-old, saves the life of an elderly aristocrat who has a heart-attack in a public lavatory. This chance meeting ultimately requires Will to re-evaluate his sense of the past and his family's history.

== Plot summary ==
William Beckwith is a privileged, attractive and sexually adventurous young gay man. He is the grandson and heir of Viscount Beckwith, an elder statesman and a recent peer. To avoid death duties, that grandfather has already settled most of his estate on Will, who therefore has substantial private means and no need of work.

As the novel opens, Will is seeing a young, working-class, black man named Arthur. His preoccupation with Arthur is almost entirely physical.

Will is a member of the Corinthian Club ("the Corry") at which he swims, exercises and cruises men. The Corry is in no formal sense a gay club, but there is a pervasive homoerotic atmosphere.

Whilst cruising in a London park, Will enters a public toilet to find a group of older men cottaging. One of them suddenly suffers what is perhaps a minor heart attack and collapses. Will applies artificial respiration and saves the man's life. He returns home to find Arthur bleeding and terrified. Arthur has accidentally killed a friend of his brother Harold's, after an argument about drugs. Will agrees to shelter Arthur.

At the Corry, Will meets the old man again and learns that he is Lord (Charles) Nantwich. Charles invites Will to lunch at Wicks': his club. Wicks' is filled with men "of fantastic seniority".

Trapped in close confinement with Arthur, Will begins to resent him. Their boredom and tension occasionally erupts in bouts of sex. Will reads Valmouth, a novel by Ronald Firbank, given to him by his best friend, James. James is a hard-working doctor who is insecure and sexually frustrated as a gay man. The novel by Firbank echoes themes central to The Swimming-Pool Library: secrets and discretion; extreme old age, colonialism, race and camp; the sense of deeper truths residing behind a thin façade of artifice.

Back at the flat, William finds his six-year-old nephew Rupert, who has run away from home. Rupert loves Will and is interested in homosexuality. Despite his youth, Rupert exhibits a strong gay sensibility. Will calls his sister Philippa and her husband Gavin comes to collect Rupert.

Will visits Charles at his home, where he lives with his servant Lewis. Lewis is curt, even slightly aggressive and seems jealously protective of Nantwich. Charles's house is filled with memorabilia and books; there are homoerotic paintings as well as a portrait of a beautiful African boy. In the cellar, they look at some Roman mosaics and Charles asks Will to write his biography for him.

At the Corry, Will is attracted to Phil, a young bodybuilder. Despite his physique, Phil is shy and a sexual novice.

James believes that Will is wasting his intelligence and his literary skill and urges him to write Charles's biography. Will returns to Charles's house to find him locked in his bedroom by Lewis. Their master/servant relationship is complex and fraught. Will takes Charles' diaries and notes home.

Charles's early life vividly illustrates themes central to the experience of being homosexual, privileged and British. Will reads of his boyhood at public school, where he experienced sexuality by turns brutal and tender. He is cruelly raped by one boy but later taken under the protection of an older boy, Strong, who treats him gently. Strong became a soldier in the Great War, was badly injured and died insane. Charles becomes aware that he is strongly attracted to black men when he is openly propositioned by an American soldier. He experiences feelings of desperate arousal, fear and revulsion, and flees.

As a student, Charles goes on a spree with some friends in the country. They go to an abandoned hunting lodge and drink champagne. Charles has sex with one of them; a young man who feels insecure about his (comparatively) modest background and sexual inexperience.

As a young man, Charles enters the Foreign Service and travels to Sudan to act as a regional administrator. He is enchanted by the land and powerfully drawn to African men but finds himself cut off by race, rank and position. Charles ruminates on the sense of devotion that homosexuality can foster between men and how that devotion aids duty and right action.

Phil invites Will back to his lodgings in the hotel where Phil works as a waiter. Phil wants sex but is too shy so Will seduces him.

Will continues reading Charles's diaries. On the way to a boxing club financially supported by Nantwich, Will has an unpleasant encounter with a working-class boy, who offers him sex for money. Will refuses; there are undertones of fear and violence.

At the boxing club, Will meets Bill: a man he knows from the Corry. Bill is a weightlifter; a large muscular man who coaches teenage boxers. Trapped inside his body, Bill seems a fearful man. He is devoted to Nantwich, his patron, and to the boys he coaches. He is also carrying a torch for Phil.

From the diaries, Will learns that Nantwich has been to Egypt and then returned to London, where he met with Ronald Firbank: an extraordinary portrait of effete decrepitude, camp and alcoholic.

Will takes Phil to visit Staines, a successful studio photographer who echoes Cecil Beaton. Staines is a gossipy queen and socialite. His lover is a "school tart" grown old; a kept man drinking too much. Staines poses Phil bare-chested and oiled, as pornography. This episode overtly deals with gay artifice, staging and the image. Phil is idealised and objectified. Staines reveals that Charles's brother was homosexually insatiable, exploited his servants and was subsequently beaten to death, and that Charles's uncle was likewise into rough trade.

At Nantwich's house, Will and Charles talk about Ronald Firbank. Charles gives Will a beautiful edition of one of Firbank's novels as a gift. Afterwards, Will goes to Arthur's address in a working class area of London and calls but there is no answer. Returning, he encounters a group of skinheads who demand his watch, attack and queer-bash him, destroying the Firbank novel and breaking Will's nose.

Will returns to Staines's home with Nantwich. There are several other men there, including two youths and a black chef, Abdul, who works at Charles's club. Will is attracted to Abdul. It transpires that Staines and Nantwich are collaborating on the production of a pornographic film in which Abdul and the two youths are performing. The theme of voyeurism alienates Will, who finds it embarrassing and quietly leaves.

Will takes Phil out clubbing at The Shaft. He has not been there for many months and there are vivid descriptions of a night on the gay ‘scene’. Will and Phil drink, dance and meet several gay ‘types’, including a Brazilian bodybuilder. He discovers Arthur, who has been working for his brother Harold, in the bathroom and attempts to have sex with him. Arthur is obviously quite upset, and they part ways.

Will gets a telephone call from James, who has been arrested whilst seeking sex. This is ironic since James's sex-life is non-eventful compared to Will's. It appears to be a case of entrapment, with an undercover police officer soliciting sex from homosexual men.

Charles's diaries have entered the Second World War; he is entering middle-age and the tone is melancholy. He is passionately devoted to an African man; the beautiful boy whose portrait hangs in Charles's house. The boy is now grown and soon to marry.

From the diaries, Will learns how Charles's life was ruined. The African man whom he loved gets married and Charles begins to visit anonymous sex clubs and cruisy bathrooms. One night he solicits a policeman, who arrests Charles for public indecency. Despite his rank, Charles is ruthlessly prosecuted by a conservative politician of the time, who wants to make an example of him. The politician is William's grandfather. Will's wealth and his leisured gay existence are all built on a foundation of homosexual persecution. He also learns that Charles and Bill met in prison, where Bill, then a young man, had been sent for having a love-affair with a boy three years younger than himself. While Charles is in prison, he learns that Taha, the African man, has been beaten to death in an incident that is apparently racially motivated. After learning about his grandfather's past, Will decides that he cannot now write Charles's biography, nor was he intended to do so. Charles has been educating him on his own past.

Rupert has been told to watch out for Arthur; he reports that he has seen him with his brother Harold.

Will goes to Phil's hotel. He encounters a rich Argentine who propositions him. Will accepts until he finds that the man is obsessed with gay pornographic conventions, costumes and sex toys. Will finds this all slightly ridiculous and is not aroused. He refuses to consent to sex and leaves.

Upstairs, he discovers Phil having sex with Bill. Disoriented, he leaves and wanders to James's and then the Corry, where Charles Nantwich reveals his designs in giving Will the diaries. Will and James go to Staines's to see a film, not a piece of pornography but an archive recording of Ronald Firbank in old age.

== Characters ==
- William Beckwith, 25 years old, an idle young aristocrat; sometimes also called Will.
- Charles, Baron Nantwich, 83 years old, an old aristocrat; he was jailed for being a homosexual.
- Lewis, Lord Nantwich's butler before he gets fired.
- Arthur Edison Hope, William Beckwith's black boyfriend at the outset; eastender.
- Harold Edison Hope, Arthur's brother, a drug dealer.
- Tony, a friend of Harold's whom Arthur believed he had killed in a scuffle, but who is later in the novel revealed to be still alive.
- James Brook, a friend of William's; a doctor in General Practice.
- Bill, a man at the Corry, in muscular middle age, he knows Nantwich from jail.
- Ronald Staines, a photographer.
- Phil, a muscular 18-year old bodybuilder and the second of William's boyfriends in the book, met at the Corry. He lives in the dingy staff quarters of a famous hotel and likes to read.
- Sir Denis Beckwith, 1st Viscount Beckwith, Will's grandfather, hugely successful as public prosecutor and elevated to the peerage for public service.
- Rupert Croft-Parker, a.k.a. Roops, William's young nephew, 6 years old.
- Philippa Croft-Parker, William's sister; a stay-at-home mum.
- Gavin Croft-Parker, Philippa's husband; an archaeologist.
- Colin, a gay policeman who arrests James; William has had sex with him before.
- Gabriel, a gay Argentine who is obsessed with porn.

== Major themes ==
- The novel is pervaded with references to Ronald Firbank, up until the very last page.
- Homophobia is addressed in many forms, namely through getting arrested by the police (Nantwich; Bill; James) and gay-bashing (William and the skinheads).
- Through Nantwich's diary, the novel is also concerned with the lives of gay men before the gay liberation movement, both in London and in the colonies of the British Empire.

== References to other works ==
- Many of Ronald Firbank's books are mentioned – The Flower Beneath the Foot, Valmouth, Caprice, Vainglory, Inclinations, among other ones.

== Reception ==
The Swimming-Pool Library won the Somerset Maugham Award in 1988, and the E. M. Forster Award of the American Academy of Arts and Letters in 1989.

In 1988, Edmund White called it, "surely the best book about gay life yet written by an English author."

== Awards ==
- 1989 American Academy of Arts and Letters E.M. Forster Award
- 1988 Somerset Maugham Award

== Historical references ==
- The Falklands War is mentioned by Gabriel, the porn-obsessed gay Argentine.
