= Alman (surname) =

Alman is an English surname of multiple origin. It can be a variant of Allman, Alleman, from the Anglo-Norman for "German", or of Swedish or German Ahl(e)mann, or of Jewish Almen "widower".

Notable people with the surname include:

- Benjamin Alman (21st century), Canadian surgeon
- Ewan David Alman (born 1984), British actor

== See also ==
- Aleman (surname)
