= The Folding Star =

1994 novel by Alan Hollinghurst

- First edition
- Author: Alan Hollinghurst
- Language: English
- Publisher: Chatto & Windus
- Publication date: 19 May 1994
- Publication place: Great Britain
- Pages: 320
- ISBN: 978-0-7011-5913-9

The Folding Star is a 1994 novel by Alan Hollinghurst.

== Plot summary ==
The novel is the story of a gay English man, Edward Manners, who, disaffected with life, moves to a town in Flanders where he teaches two students English. One, Marcel, is plodding and plain while the other, Luc, is gifted and, to the protagonist, extremely beautiful. The novel also deals with Manners' emerging relationship with Marcel's father who curates a museum of symbolist paintings by Edgard Orst (modelled on Fernand Khnopff and James Ensor). Edward has an affair with a young foreigner named Cherif who falls deeply in love with him, but Edward, in love with Luc, can never really return his affection. We see the same pattern in the novel's recounting of Edward's youthful affair years earlier (when he was even younger than Luc) with Dawn, a handsome but not classically beautiful youth who later dies tragically. Edward soon became bored with him, and even now he can only gin up much feeling about Dawn by giving his past affair and the subsequent death of his old love a high literary treatment modeled after the tradition of the pastoral elegy. Like his forerunner von Aschenbach in Thomas Mann's Death in Venice (who obsesses over the beautiful Tadzio), and the artist Orst, Edward is a lover of beauty, not a lover of people, and people's beauty is fleeting. Thus the disappearance of Jane Byron, Orst's beautiful model, and later of Luc, Edward's version of Tadzio, represents how cruel life can be to those who worship at Beauty's altar.

Many of the characters (Manners, Orst, Marcel's father, Luc) are marked by obsession with others. The past continually intrudes into the twilight world Hollinghurst evokes, dragging Manners back to England for a time. Two major characters, both objects of romantic obsession, mysteriously disappear. The long-lost Jane Byron, beloved model for Orst, had swum out to sea at Ostend, Belgium, decades ago and was never seen again, leaving the artist with a lifelong obsession for painting her image. The beautiful youth Luc, obsessive love interest of the protagonist Manners, also disappears. In the book's enigmatic conclusion, Luc is last seen looking out from one of many photographs of missing children on a glass-fronted bulletin board at the beach in Ostend. Thus, like Byron, he ultimately ends up existing only within a frame, and his disappearance is poetically linked to the "shiftless" North Sea waves at the famous beach.

== Title ==
The "Folding Star" is an obscure name for the evening star, referenced in Milton and Wordsworth, which indicates to a shepherd the time to bring sheep safely into a sheep-fold.

== Reception ==
The Folding Star won the James Tait Black Memorial Prize for fiction in 1994.

It was also shortlisted for the Booker Prize.

The New York Review of Books described it thus: "You could read this novel as a miniature Remembrance of Things Past. Or as an expanded Death in Venice... or as a homosexual Lolita.... It is an immense pleasure to read, [filled with] funniness and poetry, handled with amazing sensitivity and accuracy." Peter Kemp, chief fiction reviewer of The Times Literary Supplement, said, "Even in its sexiest moments, it never loses its intellectual poise. Dry witticisms intersperse sweaty couplings."
