= Valmouth (musical) =

1959 flyer of the original production at the Saville Theatre

Valmouth is a 1958 musical by Sandy Wilson based on the novel of the same name by Ronald Firbank.

It premiered in London at the Lyric Hammersmith, before transferring to the Saville Theatre.

The production was directed by Vida Hope. It made a star of Fenella Fielding as Lady Parvula de Panzoust.

The musical has since been staged several times including twice at the Chichester Festival Theatre and several cast album recordings have been released. The musical has also been performed on BBC Radio, first broadcast in 1975.

== Original cast ==
- Captain Dick Thoroughfare - Alan L Edwards
- Cardinal Pirelli - Geoffrey Dunn
- Carry - Denise Hirst
- David Tooke - Peter Gilmore
- Dr Dee - Lewis Henry
- Father Colley-Mahoney - Robert Bernal
- Granny Tooke - Doris Hare
- Lady Parvula de Panzoust - Fenella Fielding
- Lady Saunter - Celia Helda
- Lt. Jack Whorwood - Aubrey Woods
- Madame Mimosa - Marcia Owen
- Mrs Hurstpierpoint - Barbara Couper
- Mrs Q. Comedy - Sally Alsford
- Mrs Thoroughfare - Betty Hardy
- Mrs Yajnavalkya - Bertice Reading (played by Cleo Laine at Saville Theatre)
- Niri-Esther - Maxine Daniels
- Sir Victor Vatt - Roderick Jones
- Thetis Tooke - Patsy Rowlands

== Songs ==
- Opening / Valmouth - Company
- Magic Fingers - Mrs Yajnavalkya
- Mustapha - Mrs Yajnavalkya
- I Loved a Man - Thetis Tooke
- What Then Can Make Him Come So Low? - Niri-Esther
- All the Girls Were Pretty - Mrs Hurstpierpoint, Lady Parvula, Mrs Thoroughfare
- Just Once More - Lady Parvula
- Lady of the Manor - Niri-Esther
- What Do I Want With Love - David Tooke
- My Big Best Shoes - Mrs Yajnavalkya, Grannie Tooke
- Niri-Esther - Jack Whorwood, Captain Dick
- The Cry of the Peacock - Mrs Yajnavalkya
- Little Baby Girl - Mrs Yajnavalkya
- The Cathedral of Clemenza - Cardianl Pirelli
- Only a Passing Phase - Lady Parvula
- Valmouth - Captain Dick
- Where the Trees Are Green With Parrots - Niri-Esther
- My Talking Day - Sister Ecclesia
- I Will Miss You - Grannie Tooke, Mrs Yajnavalkya
- Finale / Valmouth - Company

== Critical reception ==
Plays and Players wrote "Sandy Wilson's lyrics include, by my reckoning, at least half a dozen potential hits beside 'Big Best Shoes'. Valmouth, in short, bewitches by its riches as the opening chorus swore it would."
