= The Sparsholt Affair =

Novel by Alan Hollinghurst

- First edition (publ. Picador)
- Author: Alan Hollinghurst
- Language: English
- Publisher: Picador
- Publication date: 2017
- Publication place: United Kingdom
- Media type: Print
- ISBN: 9781509844937
- OCLC: 992468098
- Preceded by: The Stranger's Child

The Sparsholt Affair is the sixth novel written by British author Alan Hollinghurst. The novel explores the changing attitudes towards homosexuality in England through the lives of two men: David Sparsholt, a teenager briefly attending Oxford during the Second World War, and his openly gay son, Johnny Sparsholt, who comes of age in London just as homosexuality has been decriminalised.

== Plot ==
=== A New Man ===
In 1940, Freddie Green, a literature student at Oxford, has rooms that overlook the room of a handsome seventeen-year-old named David Sparsholt. Two of Freddie's friends, Peter Coyle, an artist, and Evert Dax, the son of an influential writer, both see Sparsholt and develop an obsession with him. Despite the fact that David has a fiancée, Connie Forshaw, Freddie introduces him to Evert, hoping to help Evert develop a relationship with him. When David is fined twenty pounds after it is discovered that he brought his fiancée up to his room, Evert offers to loan him the money to pay the fine. According to Evert, David proceeded to have sex with him. While Evert believes this is the beginning of an affair, Freddie suspects that the sex was offered as a repayment for the loan. Shortly after, David's father dies in an air raid and Freddie loses touch with him as David goes to war.

=== The Lookout ===
In the mid-1960s Johnny Sparsholt, David and Connie's son, is a teenage boy, who is attracted to a French exchange student, Bastien. Bastien spends a few weeks in the summer with the Sparsholts with Johnny spending most of his time hoping that they will renew the sexual aspect of their relationship that they engaged in the previous year, but Bastien is more interested in girls. David, who became a war hero during the Second World War, meanwhile spends much of his time with Clifford Haxby, a business friend and acquaintance, who is married but has no children.

=== Small Oils ===
Johnny Sparsholt, now an adult, lives in London in the mid-1970s as an art dealer's apprentice while trying to make a career as a painter. Sparsholt's name is infamous due to a sexual scandal involving his father, Cliff, male prostitutes and a minor politician when homosexuality was still deemed illegal several years earlier. David Sparsholt spent time in prison. His parents divorced and both remarried.

Through work Johnny meets Evert Dax, who is still friends with members of his Oxford circle, as well as befriending several young gay members of Dax's circle who are also members of the art world. Johnny becomes besotted with Ivan Goyle, the nephew of an artist whom Dax once admired. Ivan however is a self-declared gerontophile who is attracted to Dax and who is only interested in Johnny's father and the infamous Sparsholt Affair of a few years ago. Johnny also befriends the wealthy Francesca Skipton, who commissions him to paint a portrait of her with her lover Una, and who asks Johnny to father a child with her whom she can raise with Una.

=== Losses ===
By 1995 Johnny is a successful artist who has a 7-year-old daughter, Lucy, whom he conceived with Francesca, and is living with his partner, Pat.

Members of Evert's Oxford circle begin to die including Freddie Green who leaves behind a memoir which includes the details found in A New Man. Ivan discovers the memoir and persuades Johnny to read it. After the scandal Connie divorced David but he has now remarried to a woman. On a trip to London to visit his son, Johnny asks David to sit for him and also takes a chance to reintroduce him to Evert. The meeting goes well and seems to bring about new intimacy between father and son, but when Johnny brings up the matter of the £20 fine David incurred for having his fiancée Connie up in his room at Oxford, David denies the incident, and their intimate moment has passed.

=== Consolations ===
Twenty years later Johnny is now a widower after Pat dies of prostate cancer. He tries to date once more, meeting men on dating apps, but has difficulty connecting with them. While out at a club for the first time in decades he meets a young Brazilian man, Zé, and as they are about to have sex he receives texts notifying him that his father has died. David's death renews interest in the Sparsholt Affair, which discomforts Johnny. Nevertheless, he continues on with life, continuing to see Zé and beginning a portrait of Lucy made just before her wedding.

== Characters ==
- David Drummond Sparsholt, a handsome and athletic man who briefly attends Oxford before becoming a pilot and serving in the Second World War.
- Johnny Sparsholt, David's son with his wife, Connie.
- Evert Dax, the gay son of a prominent philanderer and writer, Victor Dax

== Style and influences ==
Hollinghurst identified the Henry James novella In the Cage as an influence on the work and his decision to give as little detail to the titular affair as possible.

Hollinghurst acknowledged that, like his earlier work The Stranger's Child, the narrative skips over large historical and cultural milestones, stating that he was "interested in [...] the effects of these major things."

== Reception ==
The Guardian called it a "beautifully observed" novel. Slate praised the novel as "a wonder, full of wit and tenderness, rendered in prose of unostentatious, classic beauty" and also praised Hollinghurst as the best living English stylist.

== See also ==
- Against the Law
- Peter Wildeblood
