= Elizabeth S. Allman =

American mathematician (born 1965)

- Born: Elizabeth Spencer Allman
- Education: University of California, Los Angeles (PhD)
- Scientific career
- Workplaces: University of Alaska Fairbanks
- Thesis: Polynomials Without Roots in Division Algebras (1995)
- Doctoral advisor: Murray M. Schacher

Elizabeth Spencer Allman (born 1965) is an American mathematician. She is a professor of mathematics in the Department of Mathematics and Statistics at the University of Alaska Fairbanks; her research interests range from abstract algebra and algebraic statistics to biomathematics and phylogeny.

== Education ==
Allman earned her Ph.D. in 1995 from the University of California, Los Angeles under the supervision of Murray M. Schacher. Her dissertation, in abstract algebra, was Polynomials Without Roots in Division Algebras.

== Contributions ==
With her Fairbanks colleague John A. Rhodes, Allman is the author of a book on mathematical biology and mathematical modeling, Mathematical Models in Biology: An Introduction (Cambridge University Press, 2004).

== Recognition ==
In 2012, Allman became a Fellow of the American Mathematical Society.
