= B. M. Allman =

American football and basketball coach

Coaching career (HC unless noted)

Football
- 1921–1922: Adrian

Basketball
- 1921–1923: Adrian

Head coaching record
- Overall: 5–2–1 (football); 8–14 (basketball)

B. M. Allman was an American football and basketball coach. He was the head football coach at Adrian College in Adrian, Michigan for two seasons, from 1921 to 1922, compiling a record of 5–2–1. Allman was also the head basketball coach at Adrian from 1921 to 1923, tallying a mark of 8–14.

== Head coaching record ==
=== Football ===
Year	Team	Overall	Conference	Standing	Bowl/playoffs
Adrian Bulldogs (Independent) (1921–1922)
1921	Adrian	1–2			
1922	Adrian	4–0–1			
Adrian:		5–2–1			
Total:		5–2–1			
