= Armando Alemán =

Spanish fencer

Personal information
- Born: 11 September 1904 Córdoba, Spain
- Died: 21 January 1995 (aged 90) Barcelona, Spain

Sport
- Sport: Fencing

Armando Alemán (11 September 1904 – 21 January 1995) was a Spanish fencer. He competed in the individual foil event at the 1928 Summer Olympics.
