= T. D. Allman =

American historian and journalist (1944–2024)

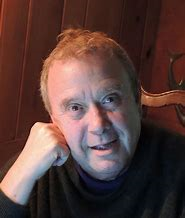

Timothy Damien Allman (October 16, 1944 – May 12, 2024) was an American author, historian, and journalist. His interviews with leading political figures such as Yasser Arafat, Helmut Kohl, Boris Yeltsin, and Manuel Antonio Noriega were published in the magazine Vanity Fair, where he was a foreign correspondent. Allman also wrote two best-selling, prize-winning books on Florida, and what events there reveal about the nature of America. One of his books on foreign policy added the phrase "Rogue State" to foreign policy discourse. He also was the first to popularize the term "secret war" to describe clandestine U.S. involvements in foreign wars.

Allman’s book Finding Florida: The True History of the Sunshine State was long-listed for the National Book Award in 2013.

== Life ==
Allman was born in Tampa, Florida, on October 16, 1944. He graduated with a B.A. with honors from Harvard University in 1966.

His first book, Unmanifest Destiny, dealing with issues of American nationalism in U.S. foreign policy, grew out of his doctoral thesis at Oxford University, but his “definitive educational experience” occurred in the lowland town of Nepalganj, Nepal, after joining the Peace Corps in order to avoid the draft. “It's there,” he later wrote, “that I learned the most important thing of all. It is that all humans are truly, totally, completely, indivisibly, equal. What I learned in Nepalganj" he added, "has kept me alive in situations when I might have gotten killed." “After Nepalganj,” as was later reported in the National Geographic magazine, “T.D. Allman exposed the CIA’s secret war in Laos, rescued massacre victims in Cambodia, became an Edward R. Murrow Fellow at the Council on Foreign Relations, survived a kidnapping in Beirut, a bullet in Tiananmen Square, and a balloon crash in Kathmandu while reporting from more than 90 countries.”

He died on May 12, 2024, at a hospital in Manhattan, from pneumonia.

== Writing ==
Allman's writing has appeared in The New Yorker, The New York Times, Esquire, The New Republic, Rolling Stone, National Geographic, as well as in The Guardian, Le Monde, The Economist.

His rescued massacre victims in Cambodia, led to his work being banned from The Washington Post. Later, as a contributing editor of Harper's, he aroused further controversy when he predicted that the U.S. defeat in Indochina had opened the door to a new epoch of Pacific Rim success for American values and economic systems. He also rebutted claims that the Earth was running out of oil and predicted that U.S. cities, far from being doomed, were on the verge of a "Yuppie renaissance". His reports from Iraq and on the Colombian drug wars received wide attention, as have his profiles of figures such as Dick Cheney.

Allman's first book on Florida, Miami: City of the Future is considered the definitive work in its field. His history of Florida, Finding Florida: The True History of the Sunshine State, was a finalist for the National Book Award, and named one of the best works of history and non-fiction by Kirkus Reviews. The Florida Association of Authors and Publishers honored it as both the best overall book on Florida, 2013–2014, and the best book in the non-fiction for adults category.

== Papers ==
Harvard University's Houghton Library is the repository of the T.D. Allman archive. The Archives and Special Collections at Amherst College also hold some of his papers.

== Legacy ==
In 1968, at age twenty-three, T.D. Allman broke his first big story: the CIA's 'secret war,' against the Communists in Laos. He accomplished this by listening to local people, then trekking over mountains to a clandestine CIA base, Long Cheng. The news in his dispatches spurred congressional investigations and protests in America, and he went on to document the CIA's involvement in the overthrow of Prince Norodom Sihanouk in Cambodia.

Author, broadcaster, and investigative analyst John Pilger on Allman and his approach: “The great American journalist T. D. Allman once defined 'genuinely objective journalism' as that which 'not only gets the facts right, it gets the meaning of events right. Objective journalism is compelling not only today. It stands the test of time. It is validated not only by 'reliable sources' but by the unfolding of history. It is reporting that which not only seems right the day it is published. It is journalism that ten, twenty, fifty years after the fact still holds up a true and intelligent mirror to events.”

The T.D. Allman Studentships, funded by the ChengZhong Focus Foundation, support ground-breaking independent research into past and present events.

== Works ==
=== As author ===
- Anatomy of a Coup, Glad Day Press, 1970 OCLC 27748719 (Note: This is not a book. It is 7 pages long. It’s an offprint from Far Eastern Economic Review, April 9, 1970.)
- Unmanifest Destiny: Mayhem and Illusion in American foreign policy — from the Monroe doctrine to Reagan's war in El Salvador. Dial Press. 1984. ISBN 978-0-385-27464-7.
- Miami: City of the Future. Atlantic Monthly Press. 1987. ISBN 978-0-87113-102-7.
- Rogue State: America at War with the World. Nation Books. 2004. ISBN 978-1-56025-562-8.
- Finding Florida The True History of the Sunshine State (First ed.). New York: Atlantic Monthly Press. 2013. ISBN 978-0-8021-2076-2.
- In France Profound: The Long History of a House, a Mountain Town, and a People (Atlantic Monthly Press, 2024) ISBN 978-0-8021-2784-6

=== As co-author or contributor ===
- Cambodia: The Widening War in Indochina
- Reporting Vietnam: American Journalism 1968–1973 ISBN 1883011590
- Conservatism as Heresy: In Defence of Monarchy
- Provence: An Inspired Anthology ISBN 0609806785
- The Florida Reader: Visions of Paradise ISBN 156164062X
- Spain: True Stories: The King Who Saved His Country OCLC 49277200 ISBN 9781885211781
- Why Bosnia? ISBN 978-0963058782
- Miami, the America Crossroad: A Centennial Journey ISBN 053659693X
- Busted: Stone Cowboys, Narco-Lords and Washington’s War on Drugs. ISBN 9781560254324
- These United States: Original Essays by Leading American Writers ISBN 1560256184
- Killed: Great Journalism Too Hot to Print ISBN 1560256184
- Marguerite Yourcenar and the USA: From Prophecy to Protest ISBN 9789052015637

==== In French ====
- Un Destin Ambigu
- La Floride : Cœur révélateur des Etats Unis, Paris: Garnier, 2019 (translated by Frederic Monneyron)

==== In Spanish ====
- Miami: La Ciudad del Futuro
- El Hombre Mas Peligroso del Mundo
