= Alan Hollinghurst =

English novelist (born 1954)

Sir Alan Hollinghurst
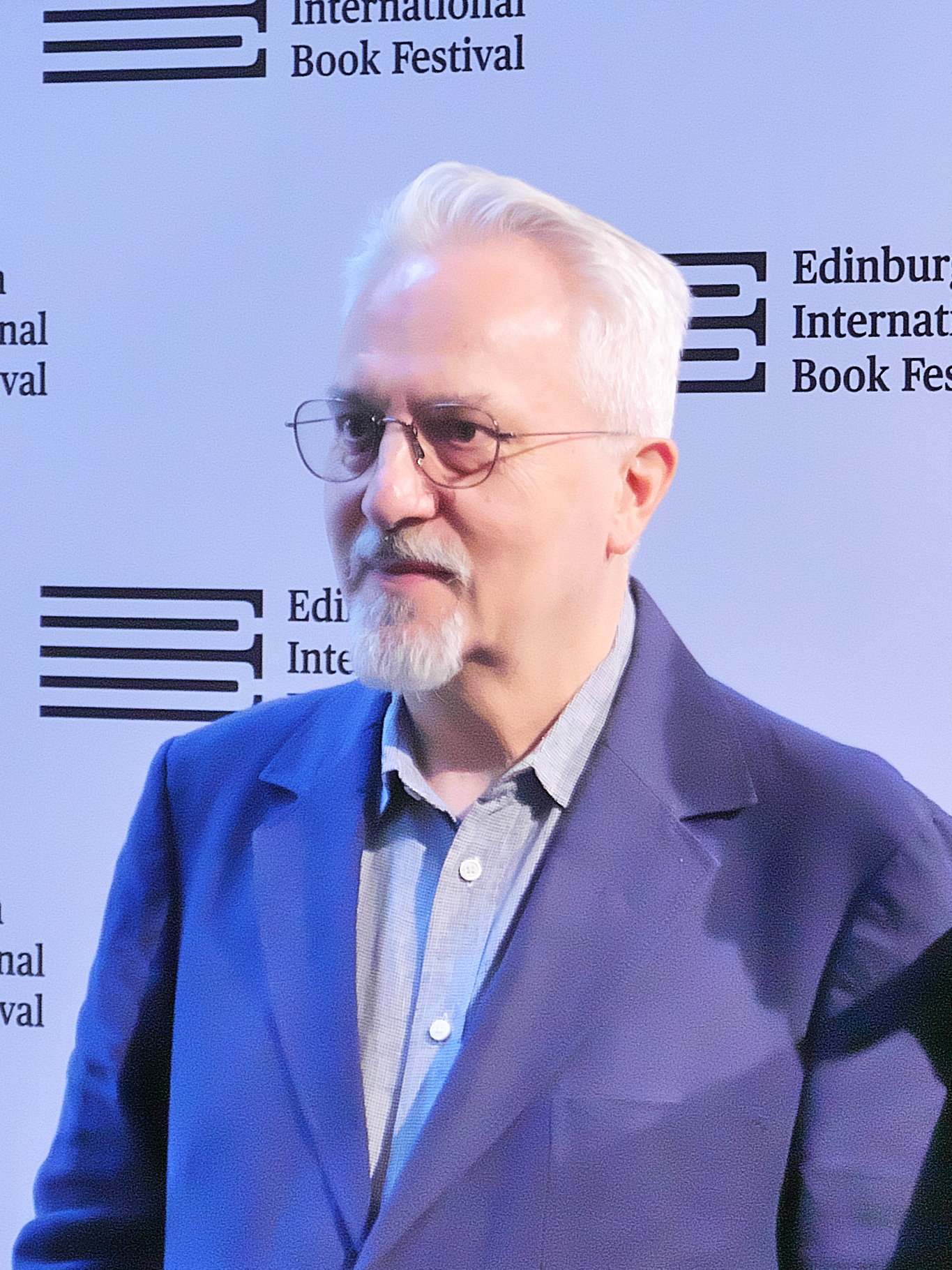
- Hollinghurst at the 2025 Edinburgh International Book Festival
- Born: Alan James Hollinghurst; 26 May 1954 (age 72); Stroud, Gloucestershire, England, United Kingdom
- Education: Magdalen College, Oxford (BA, MLitt)
- Occupations: Writer, translator
- Writing career
- Period: 1975–
- Genres: Novel, poem, short story
- Notable works: The Swimming-Pool Library; The Folding Star; The Spell; The Line of Beauty; The Stranger's Child; The Sparsholt Affair; Our Evenings
- Notable awards: Newdigate Prize; 1974; Stonewall Book Award; 1989; Somerset Maugham Award; 1989; James Tait Black Memorial Prize; 1994; Booker Prize; 2004; David Cohen Prize; 2025

Sir Alan James Hollinghurst (born 26 May 1954) is an English novelist, poet, short story writer and translator. He won the 1989 Somerset Maugham Award and the 1994 James Tait Black Memorial Prize. In 2004, he won the Booker Prize for his novel The Line of Beauty. Hollinghurst is credited with having helped gay-themed fiction to break into the literary mainstream through his seven novels since 1988.

== Early life and education ==
Hollinghurst was born in Stroud, Gloucestershire, England, only child of bank manager James Hollinghurst, who served in the RAF in the Second World War, and his wife, Elizabeth. He attended Dorset's Canford School.

He studied English at Magdalen College, Oxford, receiving a BA in 1975 and MLitt in 1979. His thesis was on works by three gay writers: Ronald Firbank, E. M. Forster and L. P. Hartley. He house-shared at Oxford with future poet laureate Andrew Motion, and was awarded poetry's Newdigate Prize, a year before Motion. In the late 1970s, Hollinghurst lectured at Magdalen, then at Somerville and Corpus Christi. In 1981, he lectured at UCL, and in 1982 joined The Times Literary Supplement, serving as deputy editor from 1985 to 1990.

Hollinghurst discussed his early life and literary influences at length in a rare interview at home in London, published in The James White Review in 1997–98.

== Writing ==
Hollinghurst won the 2004 Booker Prize for The Line of Beauty. His next novel, The Stranger's Child, made the 2011 Booker Prize longlist.

The Guardian has called Hollinghurst "one of the great writers of our time". The Sunday Times has stated "at the sentence level, Hollinghurst remains an English stylist without obvious living equal."

== Personal life ==
Hollinghurst is gay and lives in London. In 2018, he lived with the non-binary writer Paul Mendez, though the two are now separated. Hollinghurst previously said: "I'm not at all easy to live with. I wish I could integrate writing into ordinary social life, but I don't seem to be able to. I could when I started [writing]. I suppose I had more energy then. Now I have to isolate myself for long periods."

== Awards and honours ==
- 1974: Newdigate Prize
- 1989: Somerset Maugham Award, for The Swimming-Pool Library
- 1989: Stonewall Book Award, for The Swimming-Pool Library
- 1994: James Tait Black Memorial Prize, for The Folding Star
- 1995: Lambda Literary Award for Gay Fiction, for The Folding Star
- 1995: Elected Fellow of the Royal Society of Literature
- 2004: Booker Prize, for The Line of Beauty
- 2011: Booker Prize, longlist for The Stranger's Child
- 2011: Bill Whitehead Award for Lifetime Achievement from Publishing Triangle
- 2025: David Cohen Prize

== Works ==
Hollinghurst talks about his novel The Stranger's Child on Bookbits radio.

=== Novels ===
- The Swimming-Pool Library, 1988, ISBN 9780679722564
- The Folding Star, 1994, ISBN 9780099476917
- The Spell, 1998, ISBN 9780099276944
- The Line of Beauty, 2004, ISBN 9780330483216
- The Stranger's Child, 2011, ISBN 9780330483278
- The Sparsholt Affair, 2017, ISBN 9781447208228
- Our Evenings, 2024, ISBN 9781447208235

=== Short stories ===
- "A Thieving Boy" (In Firebird 2: Writing Today. Penguin, 1983)
- "Sharps and Flats" (In Granta 43. 1993), was incorporated into Hollinghurst's second novel, The Folding Star
- "Highlights" (In Granta 100. 2007)

=== Poetry ===
- Isherwood is at Santa Monica (Sycamore Broadsheet 22: two poems, hand-printed on a single folded sheet), Oxford: Sycamore Press 1975
- Poetry Introduction 4 (ten poems: "Over the Wall", "Nightfall", "Survey", "Christmas Day at Home", "The Drowned Field", "Alonso", "Isherwood is at Santa Monica", "Ben Dancing at Wayland's Smithy", "Convalescence in Lower Largo", "The Well"), Faber and Faber, 1978 ISBN 9780571111435
- Confidential Chats with Boys, Oxford: Sycamore Press, 1982 (based on the book Confidential Chats with Boys by William Lee Howard, MD, 1911, Sydney, Australia)
- "Mud" (London Review of Books, Vol. 4, No. 19, 21 October 1982)

=== Translations ===
- Bajazet by Jean Racine, Chatto & Windus, 1991, ISBN 9780701138530
- Bérénice and Bajazet by Jean Racine, Faber and Faber, 2012, ISBN 9780571299089

=== As editor ===
- New Writing 4 (with A. S. Byatt), 1995, ISBN 9780099532316
- A. E. Housman: Poems Selected by Alan Hollinghurst, Faber and Faber, 2001, ISBN 9780571207053
