= Bill Yates (footballer) =

English footballer and cricketer

Personal information
- Full name: William Yates
- Date of birth: 20 March 1903
- Place of birth: Little Lever, England
- Date of death: 13 October 1978 (aged 75)
- Place of death: Slough, England
- Position: Goalkeeper

Youth career
- –: Little Lever St Matthew's

Senior career*
Years	Team	Apps	(Gls)
1925–1926	Bolton Wanderers	6	(0)
1926–1929	Watford	47	(0)
1929–1931	Northfleet United	–	(–)
Total		53	(0)
- * Club domestic league appearances and goals

William Yates (20 March 1903 – 13 October 1978) was an English footballer and cricketer.

Born in Little Lever, a village near Bolton, Lancashire, Yates played professional football as a goalkeeper for Bolton Wanderers and Watford in the Football League, and also represented non-league side Northfleet United. As a cricketer, he was a leg break bowler and wicket-keeper who played Minor counties cricket for Buckinghamshire. He died in Slough at the age of 75.

== Football career ==
A goalkeeper, Yates played for his village team, Little Lever St Matthew's, before joining Football League club Bolton Wanderers. Mainly used as an understudy to first-choice custodian Dick Pym, he made six appearances in the First Division during the 1925–26 season. Yates joined Third Division South side Watford in October 1926, and played in all of the club's remaining fixtures in the 1926–27 season. He remained at Watford for a further two seasons, but was largely a reserve player. Yates left Watford in June 1929, having played 47 league games, and a further two matches in the FA Cup. He subsequently played for Northfleet United.

Following his retirement as a player in 1931, Yates became a coach in the Netherlands. He continued in this role until 1940, when he returned to the United Kingdom due to the German invasion of the Netherlands.

== Cricket career ==
A leg break bowler who could also field as a wicket-keeper, Yates played Minor counties cricket for Buckinghamshire, first appearing for the county in the 1946 Minor Counties Championship against Berkshire. He played Minor counties cricket for Buckinghamshire from 1946 to 1952, which included a total of 23 Minor Counties Championship matches. A versatile player, Yates' highest score with the bat was an unbeaten 117 against Bedfordshire in 1946. Despite playing in the field as a wicket-keeper for the majority of his career with Buckinghamshire, his leg break bowling came in useful on some occasions. Twice he took a five-wicket haul with the ball: in 1951 against Hertfordshire when he took 5/37, and in 1952 against Oxfordshire when he took 5/34.
