= The Stranger's Child =

2011 novel by Alan Hollinghurst

- First edition
- Author: Alan Hollinghurst
- Language: English
- Genre: Fiction, Historical fiction, LGBT literature
- Set in: 1913; England; Italy
- Publisher: Picador
- Publication date: 2011
- Media type: Print and digital
- ISBN: 9780330483247

Alan Hollinghurst talks about The Stranger's Child on Bookbits radio.

The Stranger's Child is the fifth novel by Alan Hollinghurst, first published in June 2011. The book tells the story of a minor poet, Cecil Valance, who is killed in the First World War. In 1913, he visits a Cambridge friend, George Sawle, at the latter's home in Stanmore, Middlesex. While there Valance writes a poem entitled "Two Acres", about the Sawles' house and addressed, ambiguously, either to George himself or to George's younger sister, Daphne. The poem goes on to become famous and the novel follows the changing reputation of Valance and his poetry in the following decades.

The phrase "the stranger's child" comes from the poem In Memoriam A.H.H. by Alfred, Lord Tennyson: "And year by year the landscape grow / Familiar to the stranger's child." In an interview with The Oxonian Review in 2012, Hollinghurst commented of the epigraph that "[t]he music of the words is absolutely wonderful, marvellously sad and consoling all at once. It fitted exactly with an idea I wanted to pursue in the book about the unknowability of the future".

== Plot ==
The Stranger's Child consists of five sections, each set in a different period:

=== Two Acres ===
In 1913 Cecil Valance, the 22-year-old heir to a large country estate and a published poet, spends a weekend at Two Acres, the suburban family home of his younger Cambridge University friend, George Sawle. Cecil makes a deep impression on the Sawle family, not least on George's 16-year-old younger sister Daphne, who develops a crush on him. Unbeknownst to the Sawles, Cecil and George are gay and the two of them spend much of their time together engaging in amorous trysts.

On his final night at Two Acres, Cecil drunkenly kisses Daphne. On the following morning she discovers that the autograph book she has asked Cecil to sign contains a freshly written five-page poem, which he has entitled 'Two Acres'. Daphne believes that the poem contains secret references to her kiss with Cecil and is surprised when George is churlish in his reaction to it.

=== Revel ===
In 1926 members of the Sawle and Valance families gather over a weekend at Corley Court, the large country house at the centre of the Valance family estate. They are there to discuss the life and legacy of Cecil – killed during World War I – and to assist a family friend, Sebastian "Sebby" Stokes, who is planning to write an 'authorized' memoir of the, by now, famous soldier-poet. Daphne has married Cecil's younger brother, Dudley, and is now Lady Valance. The couple have two children and a tense, unhappy marriage.

Though Sebby hints that he may have known about the affair between Cecil and George, the latter refuses to say anything of it, as does his mother, Freda, who accidentally became aware of it after uncovering love letters written by Cecil to George which she stole and claimed to have destroyed. Daphne, no longer enchanted by the feelings she once had for Cecil, nevertheless plays along with the fiction that he loved her.

After a drunken dinner, Eva Riley, the fashionable designer engaged by Dudley to modernize the Corley Court interiors, makes a pass at Daphne. The latter, however, prefers to spend the night kissing Revel Ralph, a family friend who – as Daphne well knows – prefers men. The following morning after many of the guests leave, Daphne's younger son Wilfred discovers that Clara Kalbeck, Freda Sawle's elderly German companion, has died in a fall. He tells his father about it and in the process accidentally uncovers an affair between his father and his nanny, although he is too young to understand it.

=== Steady, Boys, Steady! ===
In 1967, Paul Bryant, a young man in his 20s, has just started work at a bank. Walking his manager, Mr Keeping, home he encounters the matriarch of the family, Mrs Jacobs. Mrs Jacobs is Daphne Sawle, now on her third marriage and 69 years old.

Paul is a closeted gay man and at work he encounters Peter Rowe, to whom he is immediately attracted and whom he recognizes as also being gay. Rowe is a young school teacher at Corley Court, which has now been converted into a private prep school for boys. He is also a friend of Corinna Keeping, Daphne's eldest child, who also teaches at the school.

Because of their loose connections to the Keeping family both men are invited to Daphne's 70th birthday party where they meet George Sawle and they talk about Cecil Valance. George discusses Sebby's book and intimates that Cecil was gay, suggesting that with the imminent passage of the Sexual Offences Act 1967 this information will become more public. Paul and Peter sneak away from the party to have a sexual encounter and later make plans to meet again using the pretext of Paul visiting Corley Court to see Cecil's tomb which is installed in the chapel there.

On their first date at Corley Court Peter finds Paul inexperienced and shy but decides to keep him as a potential boyfriend. He also muses on the idea of writing an updated biography of Cecil Valance, although by now he is considered a minor poet and has been eclipsed in reputation by his younger brother Dudley.

=== Something of a Poet ===
By 1980, Paul, now no longer with Peter, is working on a definitive biography of Cecil, hoping to explore his sexuality. He faces competition from Nigel Dupont, who is writing a book on Cecil's poetry at the same time. Paul reaches out to Dudley, George, and Daphne in an attempt to find out more information for his book. By now the surviving Sawles and Valances are elderly and unwilling to talk. Dudley refuses to collaborate with Paul and George gives a rambling interview in which he implies that Cecil was bisexual and also fathered Daphne's eldest child Corinna.

Paul at last secures an interview with Daphne, but she too is unforthcoming and is deliberately evasive about Cecil.

=== The Old Companions ===
At a memorial service for Peter Rowe, who has died at the age of 62, antiquarian Rob Salter meets several of Peter's friends including his civil partner and Paul Bryant, now a semi-famous biographer. He is seated beside Daphne's granddaughter, Jennifer Ralph, descended from her marriage to Revel Ralph. Jennifer openly disapproves of Paul as his first biography England Trembles, on Cecil Valance, made numerous unsubstantiated claims concerning Cecil's life: that Corinna was in fact Cecil's daughter, that Dudley was himself gay, and that Jennifer's real grandfather was the artist Mark Gibbons, a family friend.

During the course of his work Rob is shown a series of hand-copied letters recovered from the home of Harry Hewitt, the Sawles' former neighbour and another gay character. The majority of the correspondence is from Hubert Sawle, George and Daphne's older brother, whom Hewitt has tried, unsuccessfully, to woo in the years before Hubert's death in WWI. Another five letters appear to be from Cecil Valance to Hewitt and hint at a sexual affair between the two of them.

Rob goes to Harry Hewitt's former home before it is demolished to see if he can find any other evidence but learns that all the papers had been burned in a bonfire the day before.

== Characters ==
=== Valance family ===
- Cecil Valance, a Cambridge student and poet from an aristocratic family and the heir of Corley Court. During his days at Cambridge he has an affair with the younger George Sawle and later pretends to fall in love with George's teenage sister Daphne. He is killed in action during WWI and his reputation as a poet grows after his death.
- Dudley Valance, Cecil's younger brother who is a writer himself but who is seen as never living up to his older brother. He marries Daphne and has two children with her, Corinna and Wilfred.
- Lady Louisa Valance, Cecil and Dudley's mother, affectionately known as the general for her tough spirit.
- Corinna Keeping, Dudley and Daphne's eldest child who is rumoured to actually be the progeny of Cecil. She goes on to become a school teacher at Corley Court and later dies of cancer.

=== Sawle family ===
- George Sawle, a young history student who has an affair with Cecil. Shortly after Cecil's death his mother discovers his relationship with Cecil and George enters into a passionless marriage with a fellow scholar, Madeleine.
- Daphne "Duffle" Sawle, George's younger sister who develops a crush on Cecil during his brief stay at Two Acres, her family home. Daphne and Cecil have a passionate correspondence during her youth and after his death she marries his younger brother Dudley though she is unhappy and uncomfortable in her role as Lady Valance.
- Freda Sawle, mother of Hubert, her eldest son, also killed in action in WWI, George and Daphne.

== Key themes ==
In particular The Stranger's Child looks at the gradual evolution of gay culture in Britain and the effects of memory and ageing on individuals and society (for instance literary reputation, architecture and romantic relationships).

== Critical reception ==
Nicola Shulman in the Evening Standard said: "This subject - of memory and memorial, and the fates of the keepers of the flame - has been done before, and well, as the author acknowledges. But it may never have been done as amusingly". Peter Kemp in the Sunday Times said: "Masterly in its narrative sweep, richly textured prose and imaginative flair and depth, this novel about an increasingly threadbare literary reputation enormously enhances Hollinghurst's own. With The Stranger’s Child, an already remarkable talent unfurls into something spectacular".

== Awards and honors ==
- 2011 Man Booker Prize, longlist.
- 2011 Walter Scott Prize, shortlist.
- 2013 Prix du Meilleur Livre Étranger (Best Foreign Book Prize)
