= Arthur Allman =

English footballer

Personal information
- Full name: Arthur Allman
- Date of birth: 24 December 1890
- Place of birth: Milton, Staffordshire, England
- Date of death: 1956 (aged 65–66)
- Height: 5 ft 9 1/2 in (1.77 m)
- Position: Full back

Senior career*
Years	Team	Apps	(Gls)
1910–1911	Smallthorne		
1911–1912	Shrewsbury Town		
1912–1913	Wolverhampton Wanderers	0	(0)
1913–1914	Swansea Town		
1914–1915	Manchester United	12	(0)
1920–1921	Millwall	6	(0)
1921–1922	Aberaman Athletic		
1922–1924	Crewe Alexandra	22	(0)
1924	Aberaman Athletic		
Total		40	(0)
- * Club domestic league appearances and goals

Arthur Allman (24 December 1890 – 22 December 1956) was an English footballer. His regular position was at full back. He was born in Milton, Staffordshire. He played for Manchester United, Shrewsbury Town, Wolverhampton Wanderers (though never in a first team fixture), Swansea Town, Stoke (as a guest during the First World War), and Millwall Athletic.

== Career statistics ==
Appearances and goals by club, season and competition
Club	Season	League			FA Cup		Total	
Club	Season	Division	Apps	Goals	Apps	Goals	Apps	Goals
Wolverhampton Wanderers	1912–13	Second Division	0	0	0	0	0	0
Manchester United	1914–15	First Division	12	0	0	0	12	0
Millwall	1920–21	Third Division South	6	0	0	0	6	0
Crewe Alexandra	1922–23	Third Division North	17	0	2	0	19	0
Crewe Alexandra	1923–24	Third Division North	5	0	1	0	6	0
Career total			40	0	3	0	43	0
