= Ronald Firbank =

English novelist (1886–1926)

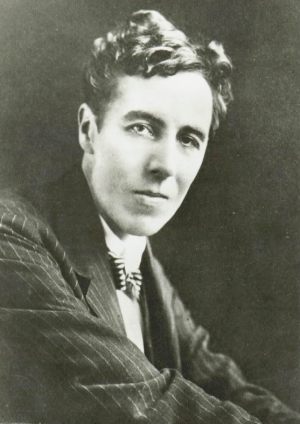
- Firbank in c. 1917
- Born: Arthur Annesley Ronald Firbank; 17 January 1886; London, England
- Died: 21 May 1926 (aged 40); Rome, Italy
- Writing career
- Notable works: Valmouth, Concerning the Eccentricities of Cardinal Pirelli
- Movement: Modernism

Arthur Annesley Ronald Firbank (17 January 1886 – 21 May 1926) was an English novelist. His eight short novels, partly inspired by the London aesthetes of the 1890s, especially Oscar Wilde, consist largely of dialogue, with references to religion, social-climbing and sexuality.

== Early life ==
Arthur Annesley Ronald Firbank was born on 17 January 1886 in Clarges Street, Westminster, the son of a member of Parliament, Sir Thomas Firbank, and Harriet Jane, Lady Firbank (née Garrett). He had an older brother, Joseph Sydney (born 1884), a younger brother, Hubert Somerset (born 1887), and a sister, Heather (born 1888).

In September 1900, at the age of 14, Firbank attended Uppingham School in Rutland, from which he graduated in April 1901. He thereafter attended Trinity Hall, Cambridge, but he left in 1909 without taking a degree. He lived off his inheritance, and spent his time travelling around Spain, Italy, the Middle East and North Africa.

== Career ==
Firbank published his first story, "Odette d'Antrevernes", in 1905, before going up to Cambridge. He then produced a series of novels, from The Artificial Princess (written in 1915, published posthumously in 1934) and Vainglory (1915, his longest work) to Concerning the Eccentricities of Cardinal Pirelli (1926, also posthumous).

Inclinations (1916) is set mainly in Greece, where the fifteen-year-old Mabel Collins is travelling with her chaperone, Miss O'Brookomore. Mabel elopes with an Italian conte, but the plot is of minor importance and the interest, as with all Firbank's work, lies in the dialogue. His next novel Caprice followed in 1917.

Valmouth (1919) is based on the lives of various people in a health resort on the West Coast of England; most of the inhabitants are centenarians, and some are older ("the last time I went to the play...was with Charles the Second and Louise de Querouaille, to see Betterton play Shylock"). The inconsequential plot is concerned with the attempts of two elderly ladies, Mrs Hurstpierpoint and Mrs Thoroughfare, to marry off the heir to Hare-Hatch House, Captain Dick Thoroughfare. Captain Thoroughfare, who is engaged to a Black woman, Niri-Esther, is loved frantically by Thetis Tooke, a farmer's daughter, but prefers his 'chum', Jack Whorwood, to both of them. Meanwhile Mrs Yajñavalkya, a black masseuse, manages an alliance between the centenarian Lady Parvula de Panzoust and David Tooke, Thetis's brother. A musical comedy of 1958 by Sandy Wilson gave the novel some popularity in the 1960s, and has been revived several times and recorded on CD.

This was followed by a story, "Santal" (1921), which describes an Arab boy's search for God. In his next novel, The Flower Beneath The Foot (1923), the setting is an imaginary country somewhere in the Balkans. The characters include the King and Queen, sundry high-born ladies about the Court, and the usual attendant chorus of priests and nuns.

Sorrow in Sunlight (1924), renamed Prancing Nigger at the suggestion of the American publisher but first published in Britain under the author's original title, was especially successful in America. It is set in a Caribbean republic (compounded of Cuba and Haiti). A socially ambitious Black family move from their rural home to the capital, and the story is concerned with their attempts, which prove mainly abortive, to 'get into society'.

Concerning the Eccentricities of Cardinal Pirelli (1926) begins with Cardinal Pirelli christening a dog in his cathedral ("And thus being cleansed and purified, I do call thee 'Crack'!") and ends with his dying of a heart attack while chasing, naked, a choirboy around the aisles.

Firbank's play The Princess Zoubaroff (1920) has been compared to William Congreve but is rarely produced. Dame Edith Evans played the title part in a radio production in 1964. The dialogue is highly characteristic: for example, Princess Zoubaroff says: "I am always disappointed with mountains. There are no mountains in the world as high as I would wish... They irritate me invariably. I should like to shake Switzerland."

Firbank's Complete Short Stories were published in 1990 in a single volume edited by Steven Moore, and his Complete Plays in 1991, with The Princess Zoubaroff, The Mauve Tower and A Disciple from the Country.

Ronald Firbank left among his manuscripts the first few chapters of a novel set in New York, The New Rythum (sic). These were published in 1962 after a sale of many of his manuscripts and letters.

== Personal life and death ==
Firbank was openly gay and chronically shy, and was an enthusiastic consumer of alcohol and cannabis. Firbank was also a Roman Catholic, having converted in 1907.

Firbank died on 21 May 1926 from lung disease while in Rome. He was 40 years old. He is buried in the Campo Verano cemetery.

== Critical reception ==
The playwright Joe Orton was an admirer of Firbank's works, calling him "the only impressionist in the English novel" and "the source." He added that although he enjoyed several of Firbank's novels, he described his own writing as containing a greater vivid personal imagination when compared with Firbank's.

His novels have been championed by many English novelists including E. M. Forster, Evelyn Waugh, Alan Hollinghurst and Simon Raven. The poet W. H. Auden praised him highly in a radio broadcast on the BBC Third Programme in June 1961 (the text of the broadcast was published in The Listener of 8 June 1961). Susan Sontag named his novels as part of "the canon of camp" in her 1964 essay "Notes on 'Camp'".

In her 1973 critical biography, Prancing Novelist, Brigid Brophy examines Firbank's cult of Oscar Wilde.

Angela Carter created a radio play inspired by the life of Firbank called A Self-Made Man which was first broadcast on Radio 3 in 1984.

Steven Moore records Firbank's critical reception up to 1995 in his Ronald Firbank: An Annotated Bibliography of Secondary Materials (Dalkey Archive Press, 1996).

In Alan Hollinghurst's novel The Swimming Pool Library, Firbank's work and life are central themes.

== Published works ==
=== Early publications ===
- "An Early Flemish Painter", in The Academy; 73 (28 September 1903), p. 948 (about Jan Gossaert)
- "La Princesse aux soleils, romance parlée ...(Trad. de l'anglais par l'auteur)", in Les Essais. Revue Mensuelle; II (November 1904), pp. 78–80
- "Harmonie ... (trad. de l'anglais par l'auteur)", in Les Essais. Revue Mensuelle; II (February 1905), pp. 305–06
- "Souvenir d'automne. A Poem in Prose". Supplement to The King and His Navy and Army; 21 (2 December 1905)
- Odette d'Antrevernes and A Study in Temperament (stories, Elkin Mathews, 1905)
- Odette d'Antevernes (1905, separate large-paper edition; reprinted by Grant Richards in 1916 as Odette: A Fairy Tale for Weary People, with four illustrations by Albert Buhrer)
- "The Wavering Disciple. A Fantasia", in Granta; 20 (24 November 1906), pp. 110–11 and 20 (5 December 1906), pp. 130–32
- "A Study in Opal", in Granta; 21 (2 November 1907)

=== Major works ===
- Vainglory ... with a frontispiece by Félicien Rops (novel, 1915)
- Inclinations ... with two drawings by Albert Rutherston (Rothenstein) (novel, 1916)
- Caprice ... with a frontispiece by Augustus John (novel, 1917)
- "Fantasia For Orchestra in F Sharp Minor", in Art and Letters; II N.S. (1919 Spring), p. 64-79; draft of a chapter of Valmouth (1919)
- Valmouth - A Romantic Novel ... with a frontispiece by Augustus John (novel, 1919)
- The Princess Zoubaroff - A Comedy ... with frontispiece and decoration by Michel Sevier (play, 1920)
- "Santal" (story, 1921)
- The Flower Beneath The Foot - Being a Record of the Early Life of St. Laura De Nazianzi and the Times in which She Lived ... with a decoration by C. R. W. Nevinson and portraits by Augustus John and Wyndham Lewis (novel, 1923)
- "A Broken Orchid" (from Sorrow in Sunlight), in The Reviewer; 4 (1923 October), p. 15-19
- Sorrow in Sunlight (published in the U.S. as Prancing Nigger; novel, 1924)
- Concerning the Eccentricities of Cardinal Pirelli (novel, 1926)

=== Posthumous publications ===
- The Artificial Princess ... With an Introduction by Sir Coleridge Kennard (novel, 1934) [written c. 1915].
- The Complete Ronald Firbank, with a preface by Anthony Powell, (1961).
- "Lady Appledore's Mesalliance", in Cornhill Magazine; 172 (story, summer 1962), pp. 399–425 [written c. 1908].
- The New Rythum and Other Pieces (novel fragment, 1962) [incl. extracts from The Mauve Tower (play written c. 1904), A Disciple From The Country (play), "The Widow's Love" and "A Tragedy in Green"].
- The Wind & The Roses ... Introduction by Miriam J. Benkovitz, privately printed (poem, 1966)
- Ronald Firbank Far Away ... Note by Miriam J. Benkovitz (1966) [written 1904].
- Ronald Firbank - When Widows Love & A Tragedy in Green ... Introduced by Edward Martin Potoker (1980).
- Complete Short Stories. Edited with an afterword by Steven Moore (1990)
- Complete Plays. Edited with an introduction by Steven Moore (1994)
- Letters to his Mother: 1920-1924. Edited with an introduction by Anthony Hobson. (2001).
