= George Allman =

George Allman may refer to:

- George Allman (footballer) (1930–2016), English footballer
- George Allman (natural historian) (1812–1898), Irish naturalist
- George Johnston Allman (1824–1904), Irish mathematician, classical scholar, and historian
