= John Allman (poet) =

American poet (born 1935)

- Born: 1935 (age 90–91); New York City
- Education: Hunter College; Syracuse University
- Occupation: Poet

John Allman (born 1935 in New York City), also known as Jack Allman, is an American poet.

== Life ==
The son of John King Allman and Helen Burghard, and the eldest of five children, John Allman spent his early childhood in the Hell's Kitchen neighborhood of Manhattan, New York City. In 1943 the family moved to Astoria, Queens, where he eventually attended William Cullen Bryant High School until he dropped out in 1952. He earned his academic diploma at night school while working as a laboratory technician in the product control labs of Pepsi-Cola. He then enrolled in Brooklyn College as a pre-med student, but later transferred to Hunter College in the Bronx. After many delays, and a stint in California as a technician, he settled on studying the humanities and decided to become a writer. For his MA in English literature and creative writing from Syracuse University, he studied with Donald Dike, Cecil Lang, Philip Booth and Delmore Schwartz. He is retired and lives in Katonah, New York, with his wife Eileen Allman, also a writer. John Allman's papers are held at Syracuse University.

== Work ==
Algorithms (prose poems), John Allman's eighth book-length collection of poetry, was published in 2012 by Quale Press. His previous poetry book was Lowcountry (New Directions, 2007). His first book, Walking Four Ways in the Wind, was published in the Princeton Series of Contemporary Poets (Princeton University Press, 1979). Subsequent poetry books include Clio's Children (1985), Scenarios for a Mixed Landscape (1986), Curve Away From Stillness: Science Poems (1989) and Loew’s Triboro (2004) (declared a Best Book of 2004 in The Bloomsbury Review), all published by New Directions, which also published Allman’s first fiction collection, Descending Fire & Other Stories (1994). The Wallace Stevens Society Press published his Inhabited World: New & Selected Poems 1970–1995 in 1995. Allman's latest book is a new collection of short stories, A Fine Romance, to be published by Quale Press in 2015.

His prose poems appeared recently in the online journal Innisfree Poetry Journal and in the form of a chapbook, Attractions, in the online journal 2River. His prose poems about Croatia appeared recently in the print journal Sentence. He has recently completed his second collection of short stories, A Fine Romance, and has also just completed a new collection of poems entitled Older Than Our Fathers, 25 poems from which appeared in December 2008 as an electronic chapbook with the online journal Mudlark. Other poems from Older Than Our Fathers have appeared in or will soon appear in Hotel Amerika, New York Quarterly, Asheville Poetry Review, Innisfree Poetry Journal and 5AM. Other new poems are forthcoming in Massachusetts Review and Kenyon Review Online. Allman's most recent short stories have appeared in Ambusharts, Blackbird, Storyglossia and Michigan Quarterly Review. His poems have appeared in the following anthologies: After the Storm: Poems About the Gulf War, Saturday's Children: Poems About Work, New Directions in Prose and Poetry, Pushcart Prize VIII, Dog Music, Baseball I Gave You the Best Years of My Life.

The recipient of a Pushcart Prize in Poetry as well as two fellowships in poetry from the National Endowment for the Arts and the Helen Bullis Prize from Poetry Northwest, Allman's poems, stories, and essays have been widely published in such journals as The American Poetry Review, The Atlantic Monthly, The Antioch Review, The Massachusetts Review, Michigan Quarterly Review, North Dakota Quarterly, OnEarth, The Paris Review, Poetry, Poetry International, The Quarterly and The Yale Review, as well as the online journals Blackbird, Full Circle, Futurecycle, Slope and the online anthology Enskyment. His chapbook, the precursor of the later book, Lowcountry, appeared in the chapbook series done by the online journal Mudlark. Allman holds a master's degree in Creative Writing from Syracuse University and is now retired from teaching. He lives in New York, and spends his winters on Hilton Head Island, South Carolina.

== Reviews ==
"Allman is among the first rank of American poets –– he holds his place for his consistently fine ventures into new forms and ways of seeing." ––The Bloomsbury Review

"..the lyric mode proves him to be a poet of rare expansiveness and imaginative gifts." – Publishers Weekly on Scenarios for a Mixed Landscape

"Allman uses the formal powers of verse to bring shapeliness and elegance to the random mess of his own remembered experience.... Loew's Triboro is an eloquent meditation on the way mind, body, language, and desire get infused with the ghostliness of popular culture, stories and pictures inhaled in the dark.;" ––Michigan Quarterly Review

"[Allman] handles his narratives the way somebody might set about untying a formidably knotted piece of rope, grabbing hold of an end and following it back and forth, under and over as it twists and turns on itself, but never losing sight of the fact that the thing is finally, all one piece." ––The Washington Post on Descending Fire and Other Stories

"Allman goes back and forth between specificity and grand statement effortlessly, as though the speaker is not so much part of the landscape—the weather, the birds, the grains of sand we feel beneath our toes—as he embodies it. As our masterful author puts it at the end of 'Watching Weather' as he watches snow on TV, the poems resemble a lake effect, 'careless as the kiss of a stranger.'"-- Bloomsbury Review on Lowcountry

"I say this rarely about contemporary poetry books: Inhabited World is a truly major collection."—Dick Allen, American Book Review

Praise for Algorithms: "John Allman is master of the packed, surprise phrase, the sharp insight, intense articulated moment. From 'prickings of consciousness' which Baudelaire identified as the core of the prose poem, stories cross thresholds, opening up wide vistas. They call us out and into a fascinating country where the unexpected clicks into place. From these deep, 'broken,' musical narratives real life rises and gleams. I admire this collection enormously."—Brian Swann

== Awards ==
- 1976 Helen Bulls Prize from Poetry Northwest
- 1983 Pushcart Poetry Prize
- 1984, 1990 National Endowment for the Arts Creative Writing Fellowship in Poetry

== Bibliography ==
- "Caught in the Net FEATURED POET -JOHN ALLMAN", Poetry Kit, Guest Editor – Dan Masterson
- Walking four ways in the wind. Princeton University Press. 1979. ISBN 978-0-691-01359-6.
- Clio's children: Dostoevsky at Semyonov Square and other poems. New Directions Publishing. 1985. ISBN 978-0-8112-0935-9.
- Scenarios for a mixed landscape. New Directions Publishing. 1986. ISBN 978-0-8112-0989-2.
- Curve away from stillness: science poems. New Directions Publishing. 1989. ISBN 978-0-8112-1081-2.
- Descending fire & other stories. New Directions Publishing. 1994. ISBN 978-0-8112-1274-8.
- Inhabited world: new & selected poems, 1970–1995. Wallace Stevens Society Press. 1995. ISBN 978-0-9648056-0-6.
- Loew's triboro: poems. New Directions Publishing. 2004. ISBN 978-0-8112-1577-0.
- Lowcountry: poems. New Directions Publishing. 2007. ISBN 978-0-8112-1710-1.

Algorithms: prose poems Quale Press 2012 ISBN 978-1-935835-08-0
