= Jean Allemand =

French Catholic priest and Orientalist

Jean Allemand was a French Catholic priest and Orientalist, born 19 November 1799; died 9 August 1833. After his ordination he was made professor of Sacred Scripture in the Roman Seminary, Consultor of the Congregation of the Index, Censor of the Academy of the Catholic Religion, and editor of the "Annales des sciences religieuses". He wrote on Purgatory against Dudley, and a warning against the hieroglyphic discoveries of Champollion (Rome, 1834).
