= André Aleman =

Dutch neuroscientist

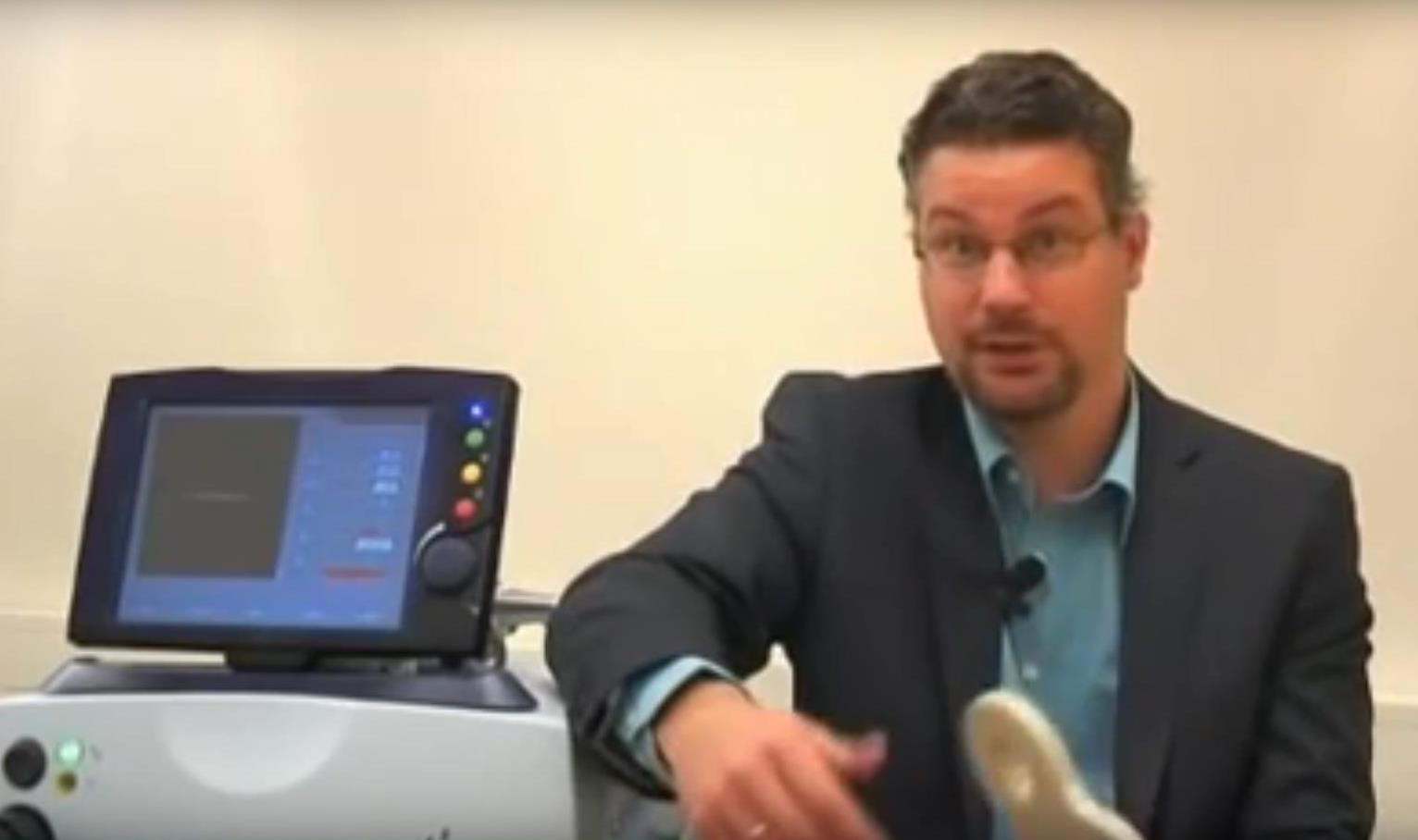
Aleman (2010)

Andreas "André" Aleman (born 20 June 1975) is a Dutch neuroscientist and professor of cognitive neuropsychiatry at the University Medical Center Groningen and the University of Groningen.

Aleman was born in Leiden. He studied psychology at Utrecht University. He obtained his title of doctor at Utrecht University in 2001, with a thesis titled: "Cognitive neuropsychiatry of hallucinations in schizophrenia: how the brain misleads itself". He worked as an adjunct professor at the University of Groningen and in 2006 was promoted to full professor. In 2011 he received a Vici grant by the Netherlands Organisation for Scientific Research.

Aleman was elected a member of the Royal Netherlands Academy of Arts and Sciences in 2017. His research encompasses topics as ageing, schizophrenia, suicide and depression. He is known for his contributions towards a better understanding of cognitive impairments in people with a diagnosis of schizophrenia. Together with Damiaan Denys (Professor of Psychiatry in Amsterdam), he proposed suicidal behavior could be considered as a mental disorder in the Diagnostic and Statistical Manual of Mental Disorders.

== Publications (selection) ==
- Andreas Aleman: Cognitive neuropsychiatry of hallucinations in schizophrenia. How the brain misleads itself. Dissertation Universiteit Utrecht, 2001. ISBN 90-393-2667-3 (Digital version)
