= John Mair (journalist) =

British journalist and academic

- Born: 1950 (age 75–76); British Guiana
- Education: London School of Economics
- Occupations: Journalist and academic

John Mair (born 1950) is a former associate senior lecturer in broadcast journalism at the Coventry University Department of Media and Communication. He is a former BBC current affairs producer who has also worked for Channel Four and ITV, and helped devise Question Time and Watchdog at the BBC.

== Biography ==
Born in British Guiana in 1950, John Mair attended Sacred Heart RC School, and after winning the Demerara scholarship in 1961 he emigrated with his family to the United Kingdom. Studying at the London School of Economics from 1968 to 1972, he earned a BSc (Econ) Honours degree in Sociology. He worked as a teacher, before joining the BBC as a producer and director from the late 1970s until 1985, going on to work freelance for the BBC, ITV and Channel 4.

== Academic background ==
Since 2005, Mair has taught at Coventry University, where he devised the university's best known brand, The Coventry Conversations. He has published five books on journalism and frequently appears in print and broadcast talking about the media.

Mair's books include Mirage in the Desert: Reporting the Arab Revolutions, which focuses on coverage of the 2010 Arab Spring, and Investigative Journalism: Dead or Alive.

== Coventry Conversations ==
Mair has invited household names such as Jon Snow, Kirsty Wark, Jeremy Vine, BBC Director General Mark Thompson, Trevor Philips and Baroness Amos to take part in Coventry Conversations and address students at the university. The "Conversations" were lauded as "the best speaker programme in any British University" by Mair's regular co-author, Professor Richard Keeble of the University of Lincoln.

Mair, who has more than two hundred broadcast credits to his name, as well as covering several world leader summits.

== Media advisor ==
Having been born in the Caribbean, Mair introduced a professional regime at the region's state broadcaster. He has also had the distinction of being a media advisor to three presidents of Guyana: Cheddi Jagan, Janet Jagan and Bharrat Jagdeo.

On 4 October 2011, Mair was scheduled to give expert evidence to the House of Lords' Communications Committee on the state of investigative journalism.

== Achievements ==
- Associate Fellow, Warwick University
- Associate Fellow, Yesu Persaud Centre for Caribbean Studies
- Visiting Professor, Zheijiang University of Media and Communications, China
- Senior Lecturer Media and Communications, Coventry University
- Events Director, The Media Society
- Council Member, The Royal Television Society (RTS)
- National Judge, RTS TV Journalist of the Year 2010
- RTS Journalism Award Winner
- Society of Editors Journalist Award judge
- Muslim Young Writers Award Judge

== Works ==
Editor (with Richard Keeble) in the production of:

- Mirage in the Desert; Reporting the Arab Spring (Arima, October 2011)
- Investigative Journalism: Dead Or Alive (Arima, September 2011)
- Face the Future; Guyana and the New Media Revolution (July 2011)
- Face the Future; Tools for the Modern Media Age (Arima, April 2011)
- Afghanistan, War and Terror; Deadlines and Frontlines (Arima, September 2010)
- Playing Footsie with the FTSE: The Great Crash/Financial Journalism (Arima, 2009)
- Do We Trust TV (Arima, 2008)
- "Tough Hutt", SecEd, 2005 (12).
