= Leslie Allman =

English footballer

Leslie Allman (26 May 1902 – 21 March 1979) was a footballer. Allman, a goalkeeper spent the majority of his career in non-league football, but made 15 professional appearances for Norwich City from 1926 to 1928.

== Sources ==
- Davage, Mike; Eastwood, John; Platt, Kevin (2001). Canary Citizens. Jarrold Publishing. ISBN 0-7117-2020-7.
