= Lehman =

Lehman may refer to:

== People ==
- Lehman (surname)
- Lehman Engel (1910–1982), American composer and conductor of Broadway musicals, television and film
- Lehman Franklin, American politician
- Lehman Kahn (1827–1915), Belgian educationalist and writer

== Places and physical features ==
- Abbotsford-Mount Lehman, a Canadian electoral district
- Lehman Township, Pennsylvania (disambiguation), either of two places
- Lehman Caves, in Great Basin National Park in Nevada

== Institutions and organizations ==
- Lehman High School (disambiguation), any of several schools
- Lake-Lehman Junior/Senior High School, in Pennsylvania
- Lehman Alternative Community School, in Ithaca, New York
- Lehman Brothers, a global financial services firm which declared bankruptcy in 2008
- Lehman College, a constituent college of the City University of New York
- Lehman's Hardware, a retail store in Ohio, specialized in products used by the Amish

== Business and finance ==
- Lehman Formula
- Lehman Review
- Lehman Wave

== See also ==
- Lehmann
- Lemann
- Layman's terms
