= Lehmann =

- Pronunciation: German: [ˈleːman]
- Language: German

Origin
- Language: Middle High German
- Origin: lēhenman
- Meaning: 'Lehnsmann'

Lehmann is a German surname.

== Geographical distribution ==
As of 2014, 75.3% of all bearers of the surname Lehmann were residents of Germany, 6.6% of the United States, 6.3% of Switzerland, 3.2% of France, 1.7% of Australia and 1.3% of Poland.

In Germany, the frequency of the surname was higher than national average in the following states:

1. Brandenburg (1:90)
2. Saxony (1:206)
3. Saxony-Anhalt (1:227)
4. Berlin (1:228)
5. Mecklenburg-Vorpommern (1:408)
6. Thuringia (1:493)

In Switzerland, the frequency of the surname was higher than national average in the following cantons:

1. Bern (1:240)
2. Solothurn (1:342)
3. Fribourg (1:486)
4. Basel-Stadt (1:524)
5. Jura (1:567)
6. Thurgau (1:606)

== People ==
- Adolf Lehmann, (1863–1937), Canadian chemist who worked in India
- Alisha Lehmann (born 1999), Swiss Footballer
- Anna Ilsabe Lehmann, wife of German poet Barthold Heinrich Brockes
- Beatrix Lehmann (1903–1979), British actress
- Christina Lehmann (born 1951), German chess master
- Christopher Lehmann-Haupt (1934–2018), American journalist, editor, critic and novelist
- Claire Lehmann (born 1985), Australian writer and editor of Quillette
- Danny Lehmann (born 1985), American baseball coach
- Darren Lehmann (born 1970), Australian cricket player and coach
- Dirk Lehmann (born 1971), German footballer
- Else Lehmann (1866–1940), German stage actress
- Erich Leo Lehmann (1917–2009), American statistician
- Erik E. Lehmann, (born 1963), German economist
- Ernst A. Lehmann, (1886–1937), German airship pilot
- Federico Carlos Lehmann (1914–1974), Colombian ornithologist
- Frank Lehmann (born 1989), German footballer
- Frederick William Lehmann (1853–1931), American Solicitor General
- Friedrich Carl Lehmann (1850–1903), German consul and botanical collector
- Geoffrey Lehmann (born 1940), Australian poet
- Geoffrey D. Lehmann (1904–1994), English-born religious missionary
- Gunnar Lehmann (born 1993), German politician
- Hans G. Lehmann (born 1939), German photographer
- Hans-Peter Lehmann (1934–2025), German opera and artistic director, and intendant
- Harry Lehmann (1924–1998), German physicist
  - Lehmann–Symanzik–Zimmermann reduction formula
- Henri Lehmann (1814–1882), German artist
- Henry Lehmann (1929–2000), American engineer
- Herman Lehmann (1859–1932), American kidnapped by Native-Americans
- Hinrich Lehmann-Grube (1932–2017), German politician
- Imogen Oona Lehmann (born 1989), German curler
- Inge Lehmann (1888–1993), Danish seismologist
  - Lehmann discontinuity
- Issachar Berend Lehmann (1661–1730), German banker
- Jacob Heinrich Wilhelm Lehmann (1800–1863), German astronomer
  - Lehmann (lunar crater)
- Jean-Pierre Lehmann (1945–2017), economist
- Jens Lehmann (born 1969), German football player
- Jens Lehmann (cyclist) (born 1967), German cyclist and politician
- Johann Georg Christian Lehmann (1792–1860), German botanist
  - Johann Gottlob Lehmann (1719–1767), German mineralogist and geologist
- John Lehmann (1907–1987), English poet
- Jörgen Lehmann (1898–1989), Danish-born Swedish chemist
- J. F. Lehmann (1864–1935), promoter of social psychiatry during the Third Reich
- Justus F. Lehmann (1921–2006), German-American psychiatrist
- Karl Bernhard Lehmann (1858–1940), German microbiologist
- Karl Lehmann (1936–2018), German bishop and cardinal
- Karl Leo Heinrich Lehmann (1894–1960), American art historian and archeologist
- Kevin K. Lehmann (born 1955), American chemist
- Laura Lehmann (born 1994), Filipino actress, TV host, model and beauty queen
- Lilli Lehmann (1848–1929), German soprano and voice coach, sister of Marie
- Liza Lehmann (1862–1918), English operatic soprano and composer
- Lotte Lehmann (1888–1976), German singer
- Manfred Lehmann (born 1945), German actor
- Marie Lehmann (soprano) (1851–1931), German soprano and voice teacher, sister of Lilli
- Marcus Lehmann (1831–1890), German Rabbi and author
- Martin Lehmann (born 1973), German choral conductor, Kreuzkantor
- Michael Lehmann (born 1957), American film and television director
- Minnette Lehmann (1928–2016), American artist
- Olga Lehmann (1912–2001), English artist and film designer
- Orla Lehmann (1810–1870), Danish statesman
- Otto Lehmann (physicist) (1855–1922), German physicist
- Otto Lehmann (movie producer) (1889–1968), German movie producer
- Peter Lehmann (winemaker) (1930–2013), Australian vintner
- Peter Lehmann (author) (born 1950), German author and publisher
- Rosamond Lehmann (1901–1990), British novelist
- R. C. Lehmann (1856–1929), English writer, politician, humourist, and former editor of Punch magazine; father of Beatrix, Rosamond and John
- Rudolf Lehmann (artist), (1819–1905), German-English portraitist and author
- Stephan Lehmann (born 1963), Swiss football player
- Sven Lehmann (politician) (born 1979), German politician
- Sylvia Lehmann (born 1954), German politician
- Tommy Lehmann (born 1964), Swedish ice hockey player
- Willi Lehmann (1884–1942), German police official and spy for the Soviets
- Winfred P. Lehmann (1916–2007), American linguist

== See also ==
- Lehmann (disambiguation)
- Lehman
- Lehmannia, a genus of slugs
- Lemann
- Herr Lehmann, book by Sven Regener
- LGB (Lehmann Gross Bahn), a producer of toy locomotives
- Lehmann–Scheffé theorem
