= Lehmann (disambiguation) =

The name Lehmann may refer to:

- Lehmann, surname of several people
- Lehmann (lunar crater), a crater on the Moon
- Lehmann (crater on Venus), a crater on Venus
- Erich Leo Lehmann, a German-born American statistician

== See also ==
- Lehman (disambiguation)
