= Lehm =

Lehm may refer to:

- Henrik Lehm (born 1960), Danish professional football manage
- Lehm., author's abbreviation for Johann Lehmann, German entomologist
- Lehm, the original surname in the family of Stanislaw Lem

== See also ==
- Lehmann
- Lehman (disambiguation)
