= Leemann =

Leemann is a surname. Notable people with the surname include:

- Sinja Leemann (born 2002), Swiss ice hockey player
- Timothy Leemann (born 1991), Swiss figure skater

== See also ==
- Lemann
