= Leman (surname) =

Leman is a surname. Notable people with the surname include:

- Albert Leman (1915–1998), Russian composer
- Ben Leman, member of Texas House of Representatives from district 13
- Bob Leman (1922–2006), American science fiction and horror author
- Bonnie Leman (1926–2010), writer, educator, and historian best known for founding and running Quilter's Newsletter Magazine
- Dennis Leman, English footballer
- Ernst Leman (1894–1917), Latvian Russian Empire World War I flying ace
- Gérard Leman (1851–1920), Belgian general
- Jeremy Leman (born 1985), known as J. Leman, American football linebacker
- John Leman (died 1632), English tradesman
- Jules Leman (1826–1880), French priest and schoolmaster
- Kevin Leman, American psychologist and author
- Loren Leman (born 1950), American politician
- Martin Leman (born 1934), British artist
- Richard Leman (born 1959), English field hockey player
- Robert Leman, (1799-1869), English artist
- Ulrich Leman (1885–1988), German painter

== See also ==
- Lehman (surname)
- Lehmann
