= KWH (disambiguation) =

kW·h, kW h, and kWh are abbreviations for kilowatt-hour, a unit of energy.

KWH may also refer to:

- KWH Group, a Finnish company
- Kachhwa Road railway station, Mirzapur district, Uttar Pradesh, India, station code KWH
- Kwai Hing station, Hong Kong, MTR station code KWH
- Kwong Wah Hospital, a hospital in Yau Ma Tei, Hong Kong
- Khwahan Airport, Badakhshan, Afghanistan, IATA code KWH
- Kowiai language, ISO 639-3 language code kwh
- Kiang Wu Hospital, in São Lázaro, Macau, China
- KWH-TV, internet stream of Kelly Writers House, University of Pennsylvania, Philadelphia, U.S.
