= Paralytic illness of Franklin D. Roosevelt =

32nd US President's physical disability of debated origin

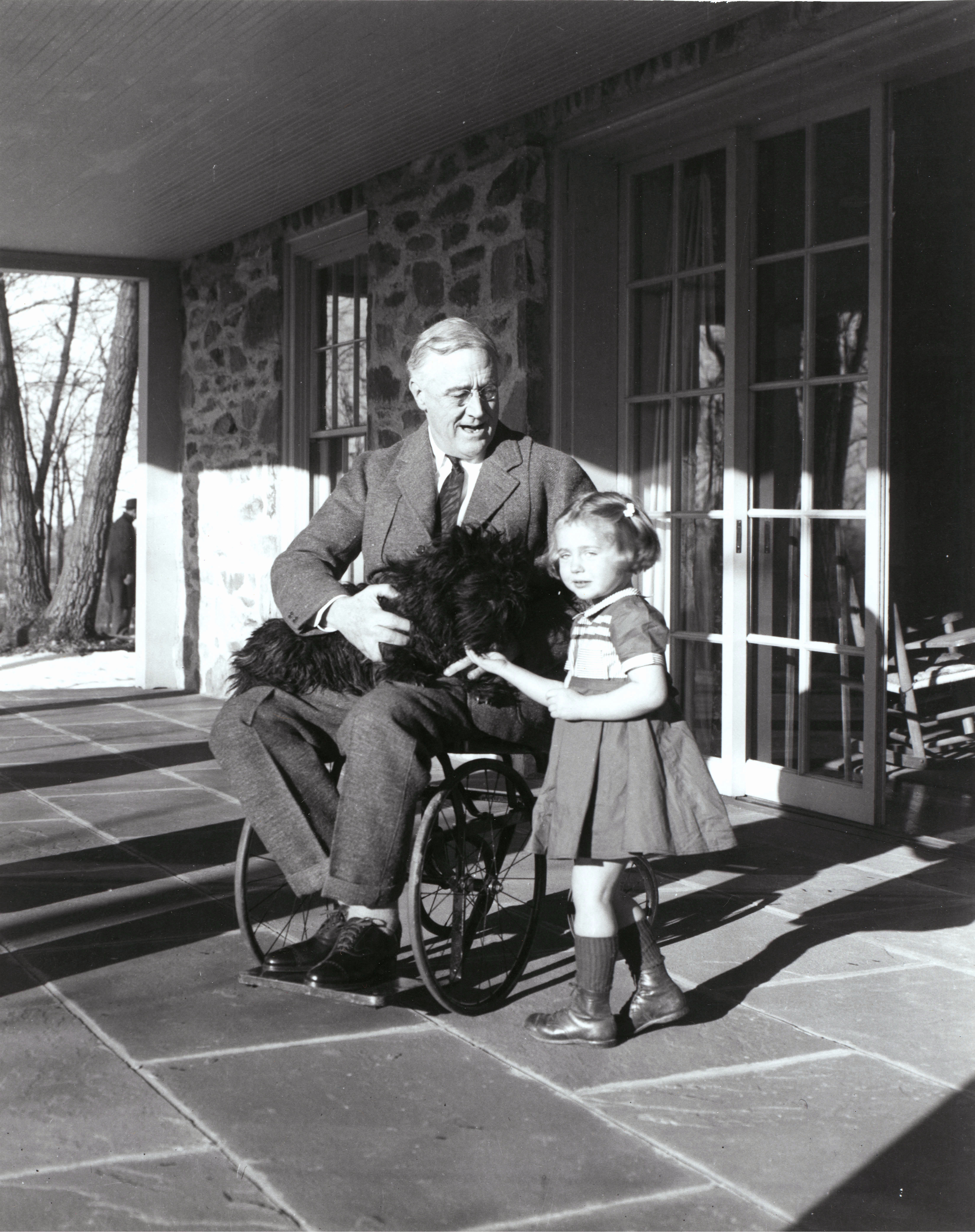
Rare photograph of Roosevelt in a wheelchair, with Ruthie Bie and Fala (1941)

Franklin D. Roosevelt, who was the president of the United States from 1933 to 1945, began experiencing symptoms of a paralytic illness in 1921 when he was 39 years old. His main symptoms were fevers; symmetric, ascending paralysis; facial paralysis; bowel and bladder dysfunction; numbness and hyperesthesia; and a descending pattern of recovery. He was diagnosed with poliomyelitis and underwent years of therapy, including hydrotherapy at Warm Springs, Georgia. Roosevelt remained paralyzed from the waist down and relied on a wheelchair and leg braces for mobility, which he took efforts to conceal in public. In 1938, he founded the National Foundation for Infantile Paralysis, leading to the development of polio vaccines. Although historical accounts continue to refer to Roosevelt's case as polio, the diagnosis has been questioned in the context of modern medical science, with a competing diagnosis of Guillain–Barré syndrome being proposed.

== Illness and aftermath ==
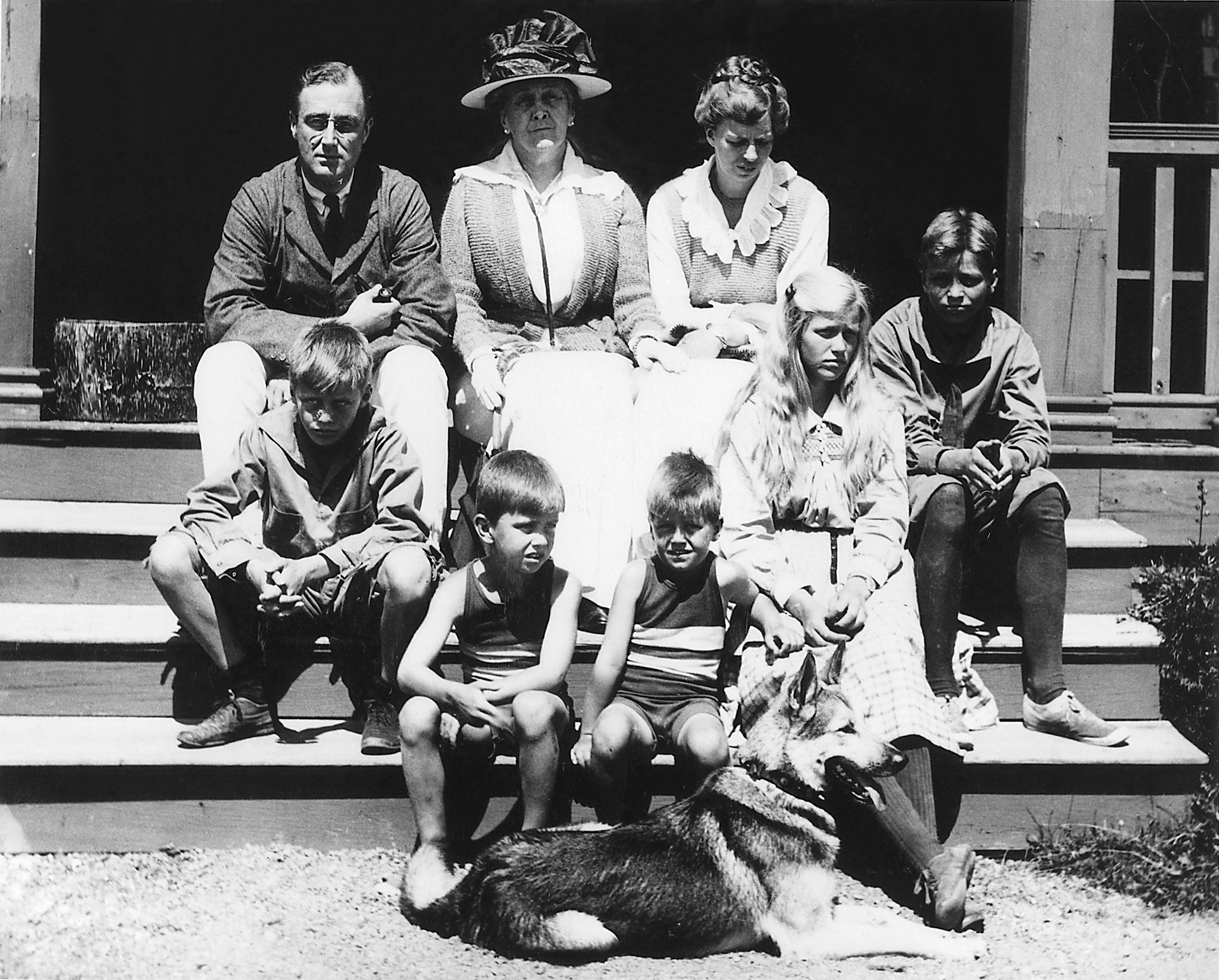
The Roosevelt family at Campobello (1920)

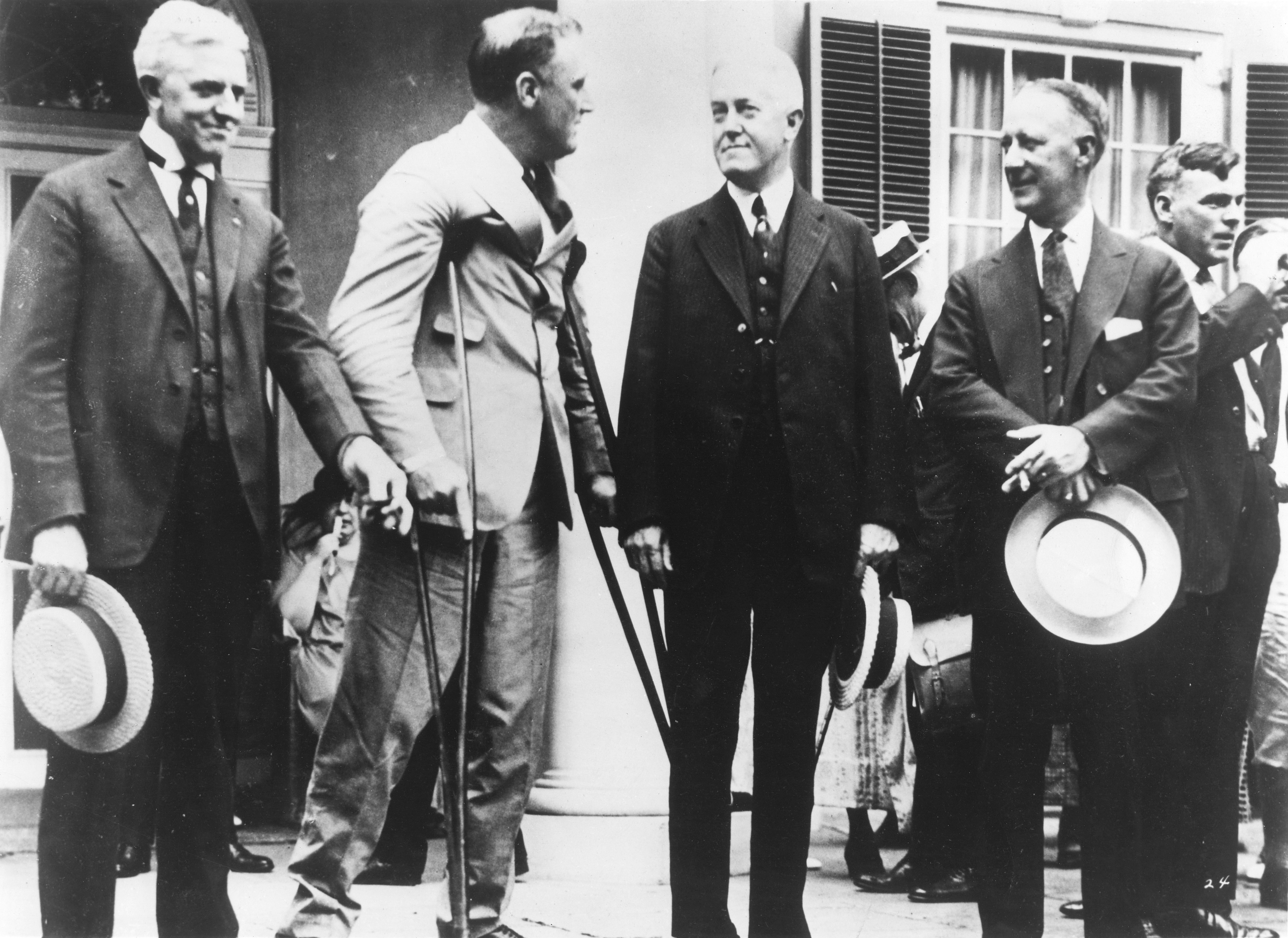
Roosevelt supporting himself on crutches at Springwood in Hyde Park, New York, with visitors including Al Smith (1924)

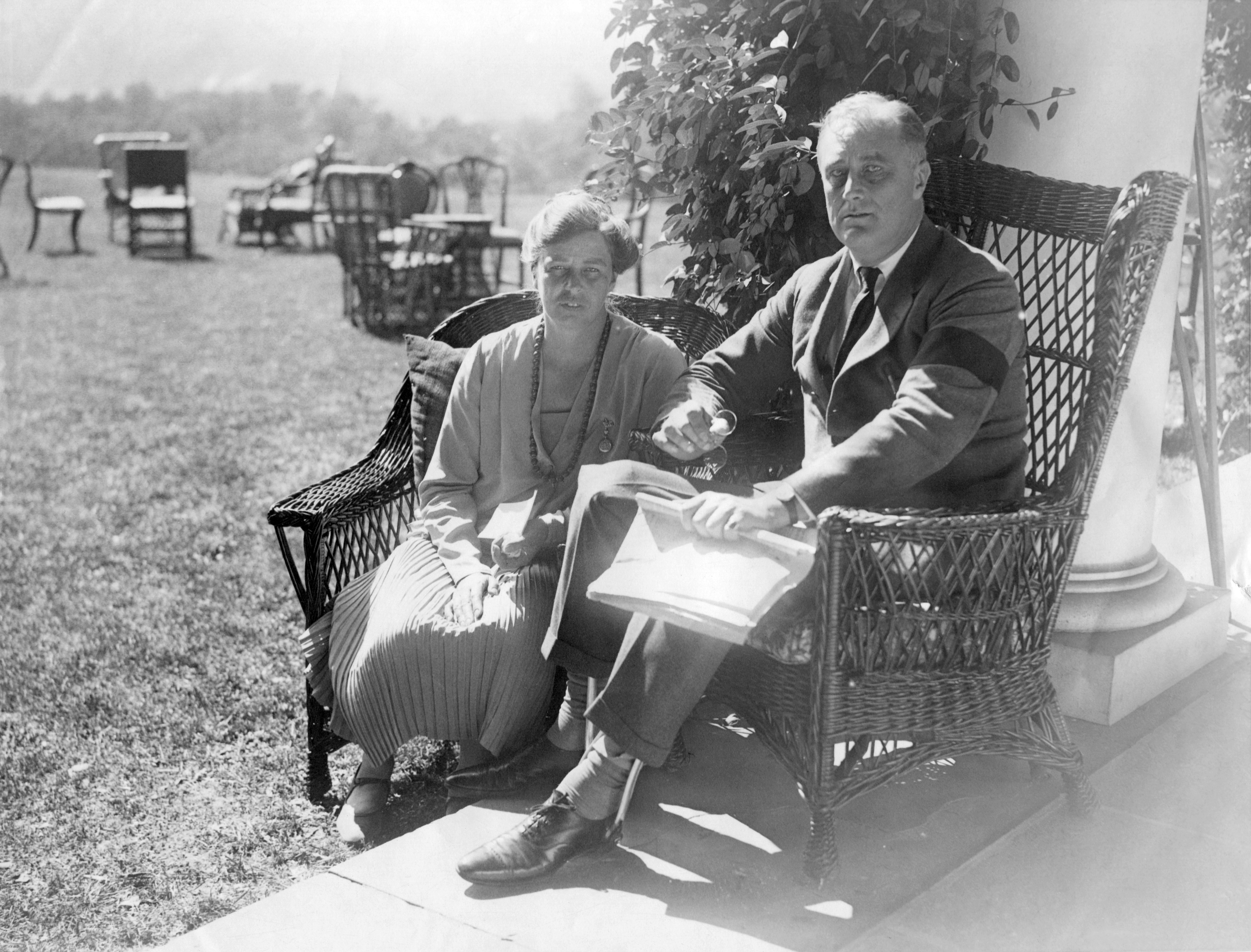
Franklin (showing leg brace) and Eleanor at Hyde Park (1927)

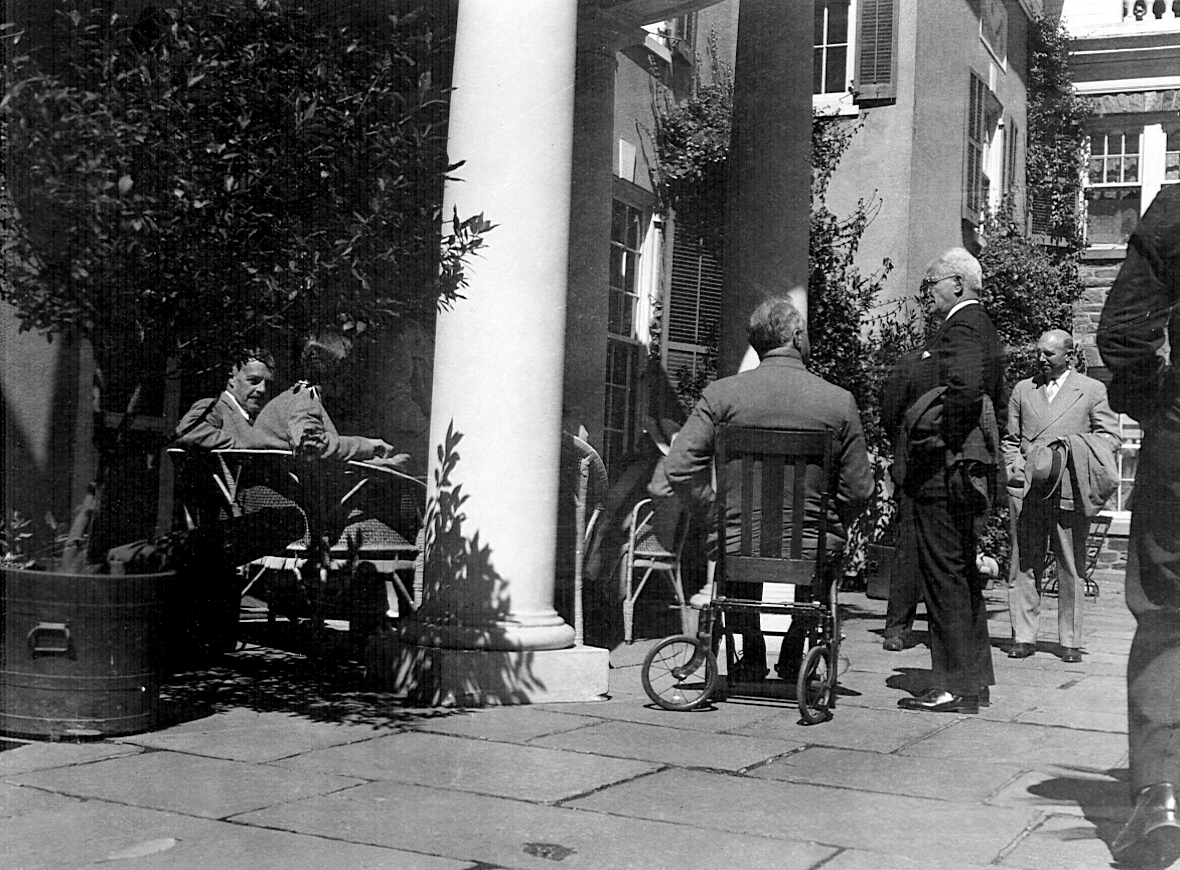
Roosevelt in his wheelchair at Springwood in Hyde Park (1937)

On August 9, 1921, 39-year-old Franklin D. Roosevelt, at the time a lawyer in private practice in New York City, joined his family at their vacation home at Campobello, a Canadian island off the coast of Maine. Among those at Campobello when Roosevelt arrived were his wife, Eleanor, their children, his political aide Louis Howe, Howe's wife, and their young son. On August 10, after a day of strenuous activity, Roosevelt came down with an illness characterized by fevers, ascending paralysis, facial paralysis, prolonged bowel and bladder dysfunction, and numbness and hypersensitivity of the skin. Roosevelt came close to death from the illness. He faced many life-threatening medical problems including the possibility of respiratory failure, urinary tract infection, injury to the urethra or bladder, decubitus ulcers, clots in the leg veins, and malnutrition. Eleanor's nursing care was responsible for Roosevelt's survival. Most of the symptoms resolved themselves, but he was left permanently paralyzed from the waist down.

=== Timeline of illness ===
Mid July: Roosevelt gave testimony to a Senate committee investigating a Navy scandal. The scandal involved accusations that he had presided over the entrapment of sailors as part of an investigation of same-sex relationships while Assistant Secretary of the Navy in the then-recently-departed Wilson administration.

July 28: Roosevelt visited the Boy Scout Jamboree at Bear Mountain State Park.

August 5–8: Roosevelt traveled to Campobello with his friend and new employer, Van Lear Black, on Black's ocean-going yacht.

August 9 (Tuesday): Roosevelt fell into the cold waters of the Bay of Fundy. Later, he arrived at Campobello.

August 10: Roosevelt spent the day physically active. Afterward, he complained of chills, nausea, and pain in his lower back. He skipped dinner and went to bed. Chills lasted through the night.

August 11: In the morning, one of his legs felt weak and he had a fever. Dr. Eben H. Bennet, a general practitioner in the nearby village of Lubec who had known the Roosevelts for years, visited Roosevelt and diagnosed a bad summer cold. By the evening, one leg was paralyzed, and the other had become weak.

August 12: Both legs were paralyzed. His temperature was 102 °F (39 °C). Pain shot through his legs, feet and back. Bennet suggested a consultation with Dr. William W. Keen, an eminent retired neurosurgeon vacationing nearby. Roosevelt's legs were numb. They then became painfully sensitive to touch, "so painful that he could not stand the pressure of the bedclothes, and even the movement of the breezes across his skin caused acute distress." He could not pass urine.

August 13: Roosevelt was paralyzed from the chest down. On that day and the following, his hands, arms, and shoulders were weak. He had difficulty moving his bowels and required enemas. Keen made what Eleanor described as "a most careful, thorough examination".

August 14: Roosevelt continued to be unable to pass urine for two weeks, and required catheterization. His fever continued for a total of six to seven days. Keen repeated his examination, a bending and prodding that Roosevelt's son, Elliott, later termed "excruciating" for his father. Keen diagnosed a clot of blood to the lower spinal cord, and prescribed massage of the leg muscles. Eleanor and Howe began massaging Roosevelt's legs as instructed by Keen, bringing on agonizing pain.

August 15: Prostrate and mildly sedated, Roosevelt was occasionally delirious.

August 19: Frederic Delano, Roosevelt's uncle, had received a letter from Louis Howe requesting to find a doctor to come see Roosevelt. Delano called his son-in-law, a physician, who recommended he speak to another physician, a Dr. Parker. Parker told Delano that the case sounded like infantile paralysis, and that the leading authorities on the disease were at the Harvard Infantile Paralysis Commission in Boston. Delano caught a train and arrived the next morning.

August 20: Dr. Samuel A. Levine was at his office when Delano telephoned Brigham Hospital on Saturday morning. Levine said the senior members of the Harvard Infantile Paralysis Commission, Dr. Lovett and Dr. Peabody, were out of town, but he would try to answer Delano's questions. After reviewing the messages Delano had received from Campobello, Levine thought Roosevelt had acute poliomyelitis. He urged that a lumbar puncture be done, with the goal of making a diagnosis, but mainly because Levine believed there could be acute benefit from the procedure. Delano phoned and wrote Eleanor the same day, advising her to stop massaging Roosevelt's legs, and to disregard Keen's advice: "I think it would be very unwise to trust his diagnosis where the Inf. Paralysis can be determined by test of the spinal fluid." Eleanor communicated with Keen, who "very strenuously" resisted the idea of poliomyelitis. Keen asked Lovett to visit Campobello.

August 22: Lovett met Levine for dinner. Lovett asked how to distinguish whether paralysis was caused by poliomyelitis or by a clot or lesion of the spinal cord.

August 23: Lovett left for Campobello.

August 24: Lovett saw Roosevelt and performed a "more or less superficial" examination since Roosevelt was highly sensitive to touch. The arms were weak; the bladder was paralyzed; the left thumb indicated atrophy. Roosevelt could not stand or walk, and Lovett documented "scattered weakness, most marked in the hips".

August 25: Roosevelt's temperature was 100 °F (38 °C). Both legs were paralyzed. His back muscles were weak. There was also weakness of the face and left hand. Pain in the legs and inability to urinate continued. After a brief conference with Keen, Lovett saw Roosevelt. Lovett informed him that the "physical findings" presented a "perfectly clear" diagnosis of poliomyelitis. He ordered an end to massage, which had no benefit and caused pain, and recommended a trained nurse to care for Roosevelt.

September 1: Roosevelt was still unable to urinate. His leg pain continued.

September 14: Roosevelt was transported to New York, by boat and train, a long and painful journey.

September 15: Roosevelt was admitted to Presbyterian Hospital in New York City for convalescence, under the care of Dr. George Draper, an expert on poliomyelitis and Roosevelt's personal physician. Lovett continued to consult from Boston. There was pain in the legs, paralysis of the legs, muscle wasting in the lower lumbar area and the buttocks, weakness of the right triceps, and gross muscle twitching in both forearms.

October 28: Roosevelt was transferred from Presbyterian Hospital to his house on East 65th Street. His chart still read "not improving".

Later: Roosevelt exercised daily. His hamstrings tightened, and his legs were encased in plaster to straighten them by degrees. There was gradual recovery, but he remained paralyzed from the waist down.

=== Diagnosis ===
After falling ill, Roosevelt was seen by four doctors. Eben Homer Bennet, the Roosevelt family doctor, diagnosed a heavy cold. William Keen, a retired neurosurgeon, thought Roosevelt had a blood clot. Robert Lovett, an expert on the orthopedic management of children paralyzed from poliomyelitis, diagnosed "infantile paralysis", as did George Draper, Roosevelt's personal physician.

Roosevelt's physicians never mentioned Guillain–Barré syndrome (GBS) in their communications concerning Roosevelt's case, indicating that they were not aware of it as a diagnostic possibility. All reports before 1921 of what became known as GBS were by European physicians, in European journals. The result was that very few American physicians knew that GBS was a distinct disease. For example, Lovett mistakenly believed that Landry's ascending paralysis (GBS), was one of the clinical presentations of paralytic polio. In 1921, an American physician would assume that if an individual developed a sudden, non-traumatic flaccid paralysis, it was due to paralytic polio. The concept of GBS as a distinct disease was not widely accepted in the United States until after the Second World War.

=== Efforts to rehabilitate ===
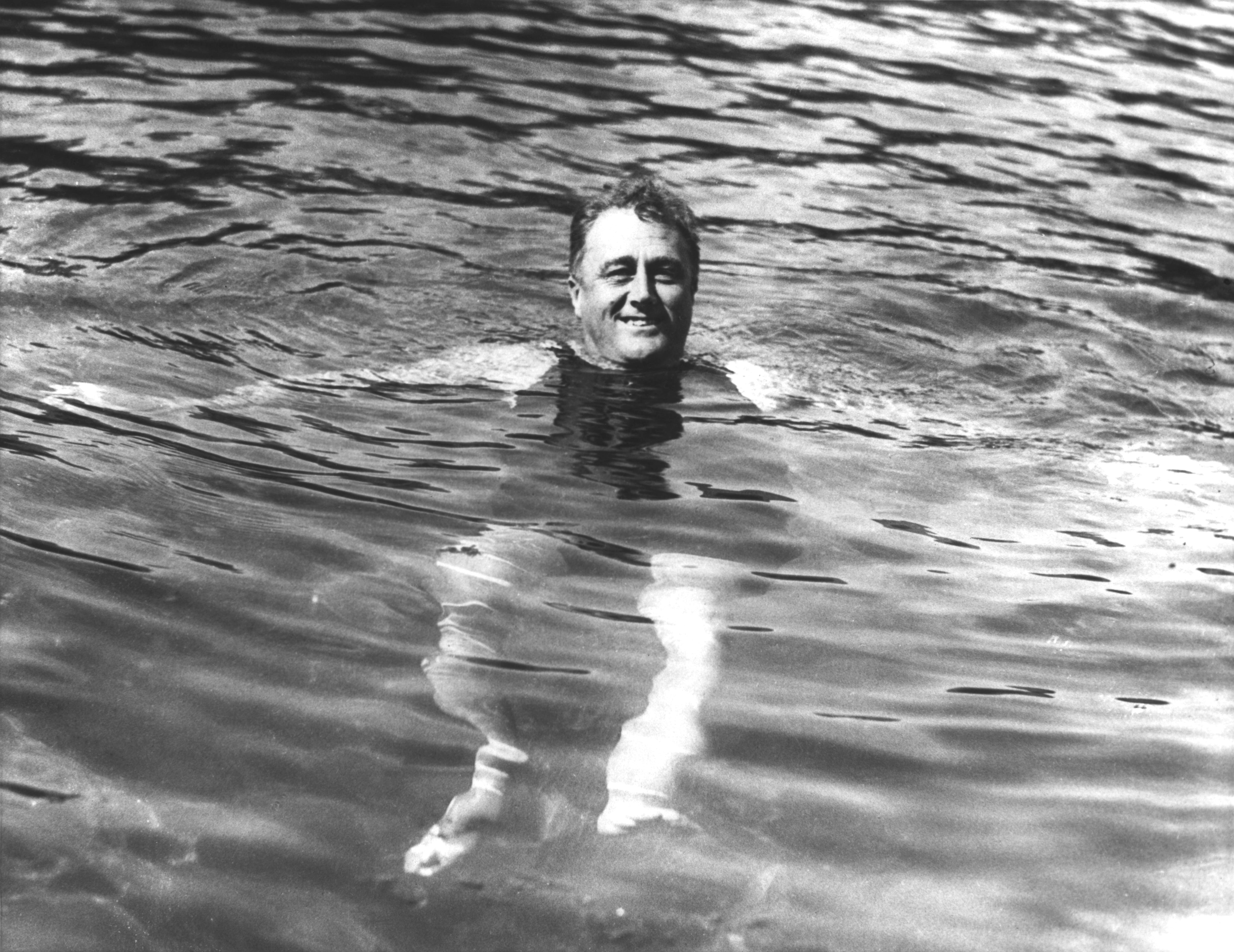
Roosevelt at Warm Springs (1929)

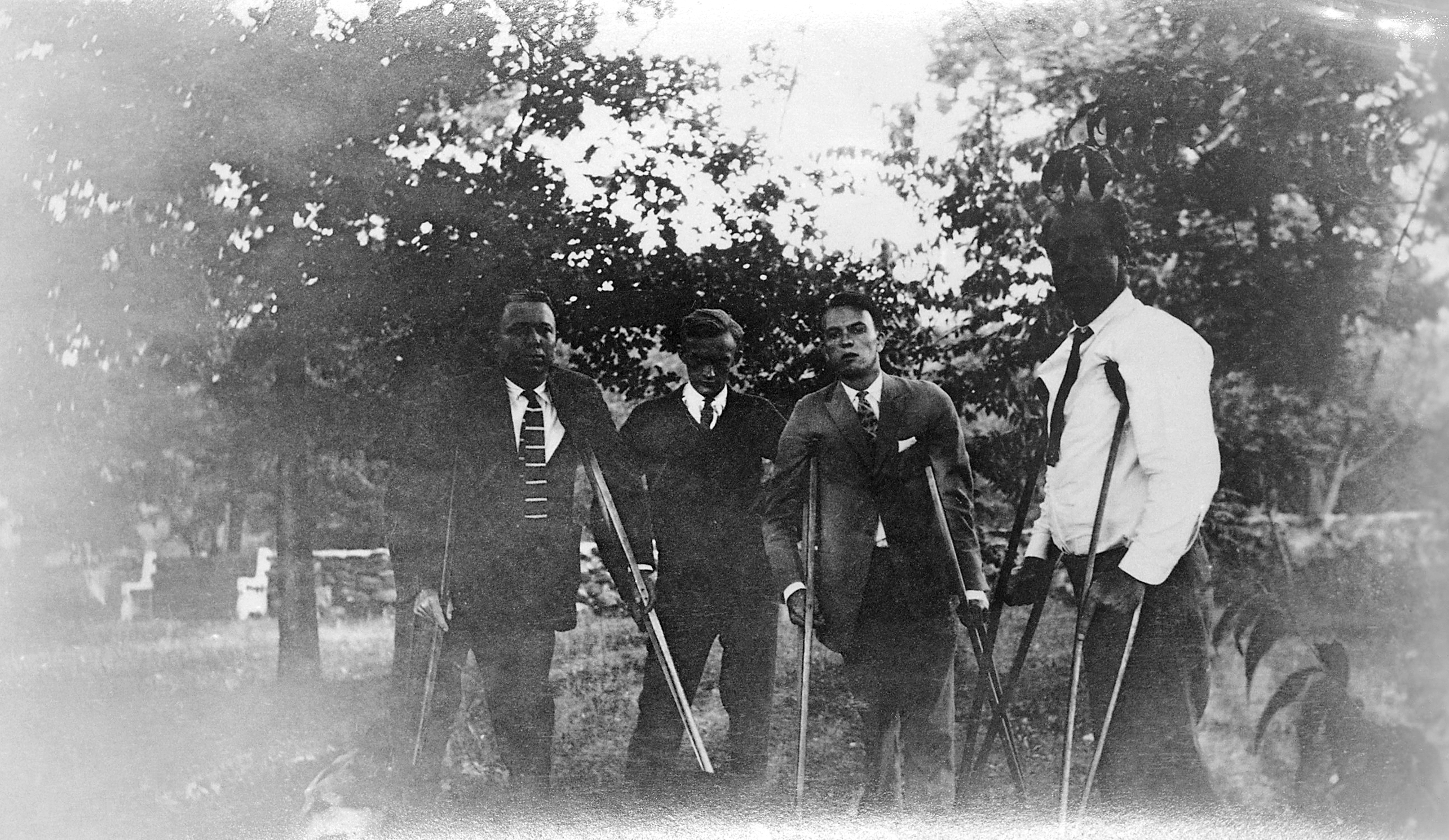
Roosevelt with polio patients in Warm Springs, Georgia (1925)

Roosevelt was totally and permanently paralyzed from the waist down, and unable to stand or walk without support. For the next few months, he confined himself to indoor pursuits, including resuming his lifelong hobby of stamp collecting. In December 1921, after he had recuperated for several months, a physiotherapist began working with him to determine the extent of the damage. He was able to perform small exercises on his own, moving one muscle and then another. He was fitted with heavy steel braces that locked at the knee and provided enough stability that he could stand with crutches. In 1922, at Springwood, he worked diligently to make his way across the room. He set himself the goal of getting down the long driveway, which he did once but never attempted again.

In October 1922, Roosevelt visited his law office at the Equitable Building in Manhattan, where a welcome-back luncheon had been arranged. The chauffeur assisting him failed to brace the tip of his left crutch and Roosevelt fell onto the highly polished lobby floor. Laughing, he asked two young men in the crowd of onlookers to help get him back on his feet. After the luncheon, he told friends it was a "grand and glorious occasion". He did not return to his office for two months.

Roosevelt believed that warmth and exercise would help rebuild his legs. He bought a run-down 71-foot (21.6 m) houseboat and, in February 1923, sailed to Florida with friends and a small crew. Eleanor found it dull and left, but Roosevelt sailed for weeks, fishing and spending time with a succession of friends who came to visit. He designed a pulley system that lowered him into the water to swim. In May 1923, Lovett documented no overall improvement over the preceding year, but Roosevelt would not accept his doctors' determination that further progress was unlikely. He tried a range of therapies and made two more voyages on his houseboat, but his efforts had no effect.

"Between 1925 and 1928, Franklin would spend more than half his time—116 of 208 weeks—away from home, struggling to find a way to regain his feet," wrote biographer Geoffrey Ward. "Eleanor was with him just 4 of those 116 weeks, and his mother was with him for only 2. His children hardly saw him."

Roosevelt lost the use of his legs and two inches of height, but the subsequent development of the rest of his body gave him a robust physique, and he enjoyed many years of excellent health. Jack Dempsey praised his upper-body musculature, and Roosevelt once landed a 237-pound (107.5 kg) shark after fighting it on his line for two hours.

Roosevelt first traveled to Warm Springs, Georgia, on October 3, 1924. For many years to come Warm Springs would be where he would retreat in comfort for hydrotherapy. With his physiotherapist at Warm Springs, Roosevelt laboriously taught himself to walk short distances while wearing iron braces on his hips and legs, by swiveling his torso. For this "two-point walk", he would grip the arm of a strong person with his left hand, and brace himself with a cane in his right.

On April 29, 1926, he bought Warm Springs with the intention of making it into a rehabilitation center for polio patients.

=== Possible Causative Role of the Newport Sex Scandal ===
For many years, Roosevelt attributed the outbreak of his illness to the emotional pressures created by a senate investigation into his role in the Newport Sex Scandal. The Senate Committee on Naval Investigations had accused Assistant Secretary of Navy Roosevelt, in his capacity of investigating same-sex relationships, of using methods of entrapment to implicate sailors. FDR put particular blame on committee member Senator Henry W. Keyes (R-New Hampshire) for scapegoating him. According to historian David Michaelis, “Franklin couldn’t live with it. He wanted vengeance . . . for the next fifteen years, he held Keyes responsible for intensifying his susceptibility to viral disease.”

=== Governor and President ===
Roosevelt was twice elected Governor of New York, on November 6, 1928, and November 4, 1930. He moved into the Governor's Mansion in Albany in January 1929. Before he moved in, the mansion was made wheelchair-friendly with ramps and an elevator.

Roosevelt won the 1932 presidential election in a landslide, becoming the first (and, as of 2026, only) physically disabled person to be President of the United States. Before he moved into the White House, ramps were added to make it wheelchair-friendly. Photos of the President were taken at certain angles and at a distance.

== Public awareness ==
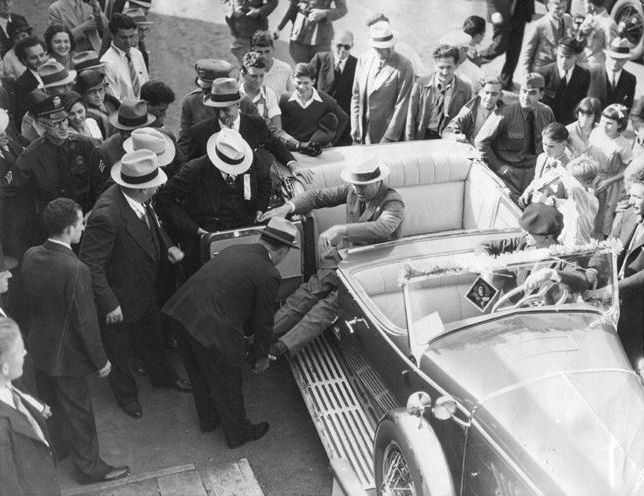
Roosevelt exiting a car during a campaign trip to Hollywood, California (1932)

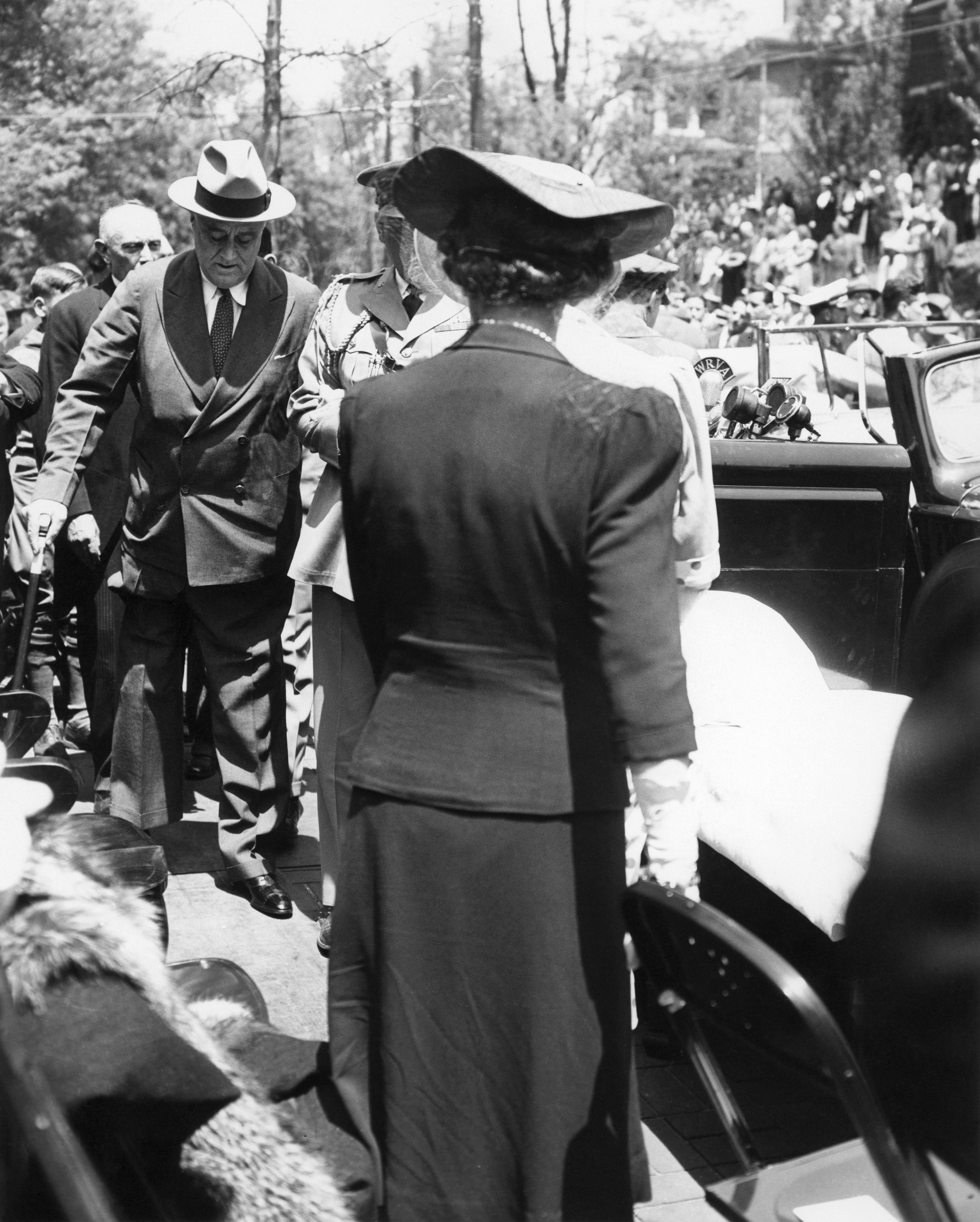
Roosevelt walking with assistance toward the dedication ceremony for the home of Woodrow Wilson (1941)

Roosevelt took great care to convince even close confidants that he was getting better, which he believed was essential if he was to run for public office again. To Richard E. Byrd, he wrote "By next autumn I will be ready to chase the nimble moose with you." To General Leonard Wood: his leg muscles "were all coming back". His public appearances were carefully choreographed to avoid the press covering his arrival and departure, which would have shown him getting into or out of a vehicle or train. In private he used a wheelchair, but was careful not to be seen using it in public, although he sometimes appeared on crutches. He usually appeared in public standing upright, supported on one side by an aide or one of his sons. For major speaking occasions, an especially solid lectern was placed on the stage so that he could support himself on it; as a result, in films of his speeches, Roosevelt can be observed using his head to make gestures because his hands were gripping the lectern.

Journalist John Gunther reported that in the 1930s, he often met people in Europe, including world leaders, who were unaware of Roosevelt's paralysis. David Brinkley, who was a young White House reporter in World War II, stated that the Secret Service actively interfered with photographers who tried to take photos of Roosevelt in a wheelchair or being moved about by others. The Secret Service commonly destroyed photographs they caught being taken in this manner; however, there were occasional exceptions.

Disability advocate Hugh Gallagher posited that Roosevelt was desperate to appear able-bodied. "FDR did not want the public to be aware that he was forced to use a wheelchair." When discussing Roosevelt's limited use of a wheelchair in public, Gallagher stated, "This was not by accident. It was a strategy that served to minimize the extent of his handicap: To make it unnoticed when possible and palatable when it was noticed." In contrast, historian James Tobin argued that Roosevelt used his disability to his advantage. Tobin stated, "But he could, instead, show himself to be something he had never been seen as before: A fighter, and better yet, an underdog. Not a man to pity; not a man to envy; but a man to cheer."

When Roosevelt addressed Congress in person on March 1, 1945, about a month before his death, he made public reference to his disability for almost the first time in 20 years. "I hope that you will pardon me for the unusual posture of sitting down during the presentation of what I wish to say," Roosevelt began, "but I know you will realize it makes it a lot easier for me in not having to carry about 10 pounds of steel around the bottom of my legs and also because of the fact I have just completed a 14,000-mile trip."

== Legacy ==
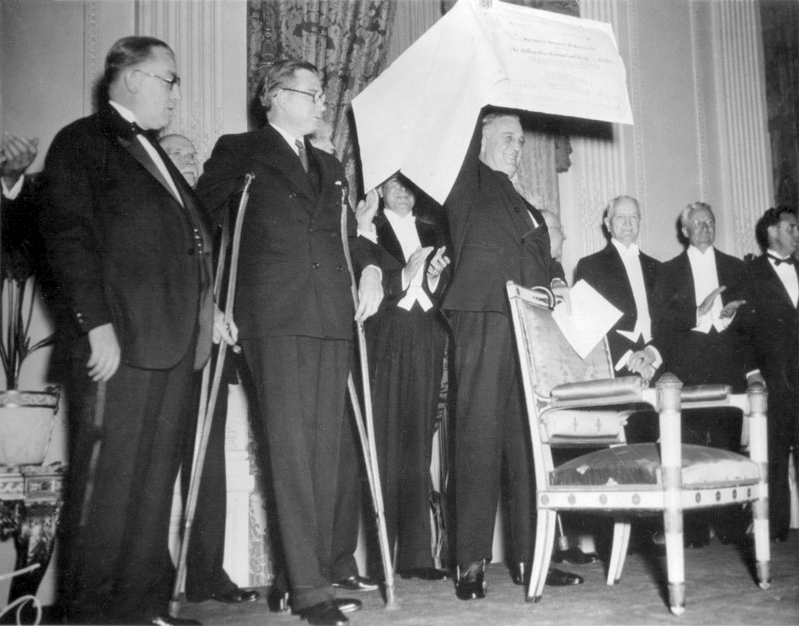
Roosevelt accepts a $1 million check, the proceeds of the first national President's Birthday Ball (1934)

=== March of Dimes ===
On January 3, 1938, Roosevelt founded the National Foundation for Infantile Paralysis, which later became the March of Dimes. Basil O'Connor, an attorney and close associate of Roosevelt, helped establish the foundation and was its president for more than three decades. The organization's annual fundraising campaign coincided with Roosevelt's birthday on January 30. The organization initially focused on the rehabilitation of victims of paralytic polio and supported the work of Jonas Salk and others that led to the development of polio vaccines. The modern March of Dimes focuses on preventing premature births, congenital disabilities, and infant mortality.

Because he founded the March of Dimes, a dime was chosen to honor Roosevelt after his death. The Roosevelt dime was issued on January 30, 1946.

=== Warm Springs Institute ===
Roosevelt's center at Warm Springs operates as the Roosevelt Warm Springs Institute for Rehabilitation, a comprehensive rehabilitation facility administered by the state of Georgia. A center for post-polio treatment, it provides vocational rehabilitation, long-term acute care, and inpatient rehabilitation for amputees and people recovering from spinal cord injuries, brain damage, and stroke.

=== Franklin Delano Roosevelt Memorial Wheelchair Statue ===
The Roosevelt Memorial in Washington, D.C., includes a statue of Roosevelt in a wheelchair. The wheelchair statue was not originally included in the memorial. It was added in January 2001 because of the concerns of disability-rights advocates and fundraising by the National Organization on Disability.

== Retrospective diagnosis ==
=== Statistical analysis ===
A 2003 peer-reviewed study by Armond Goldman and others suggested Roosevelt's illness may have actually been Guillain–Barré Syndrome (GBS) and not the initial poliomyelitis diagnosis and belief.

=== Exposure and susceptibility ===
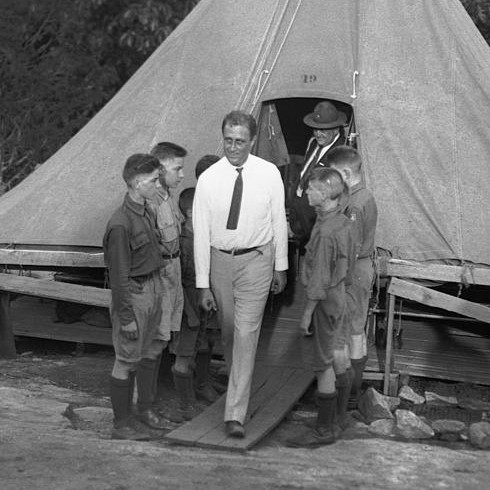
Roosevelt at the Boy Scout Jamboree in July 1921

It is possible Roosevelt was exposed to an infectious agent at the Boy Scout Jamboree in late July. The two-week interval before the onset of his neurological illness was in keeping with both the incubation period of poliomyelitis, and with exposure to an infectious agent leading to GBS. There are no reports that any scouts or personnel at the camp developed polio around the time of Roosevelt's visit. In 1912 and 1915, Roosevelt had illnesses compatible with Campylobacter jejuni, a major causative agent of GBS.

It has been stated that Roosevelt may have been predisposed to paralytic polio by genetic inheritance. However, such a genetic predisposition has never been discovered. Several authors have stated that Roosevelt was more vulnerable to polio since he was raised on an isolated family estate and had little contact with other children until he entered Groton at age 14. However, Roosevelt was not a "boy in a bubble". He had many possible exposures to polio viruses before 1921. Most polio cases are asymptomatic or a mild illnesses. Yet asymptomatic individuals can transmit the viral infection. Goldman explored the predisposition thesis by increasing the prior probability of polio in his analysis by a factor of 100, and still obtained a 99.4% overall probability of GBS (99.97% posterior probability).

=== Cerebrospinal fluid testing ===
A 2014 biography of Roosevelt by James Tobin focused on his paralysis, accepting the original diagnosis of polio. Tobin believed that Lovett had tested the diagnosis with a lumbar puncture, based on excerpts from an "unpublished note" by Dr. Samuel A. Levine of the Harvard Infantile Paralysis Commission. The book stated, "Levine's private note indicates that Dr. Lovett did examine the cerebrospinal fluid and knew very well that a high level of white blood cells was consistent with poliomyelitis... If Lovett had discovered a low white blood cell count, he would have doubted that poliomyelitis was the cause of Roosevelt's illness. Yet Lovett wrote George Draper that 'I thought [the diagnosis] was perfectly clear as far as the physical findings were concerned.'"

Goldman and his co-authors reviewed the note to which Tobin referred and other surrounding correspondence. In response to Tobin's interpretation, they pointed out that the note was written well after 1921, that no one present during Roosevelt's illness mentioned the invasive procedure being done, that it would have demanded resources not available at Campobello, and that the note made no mention of results. They further stated that such fluid testing is most effective within the first several days of paralysis onset, and Lovett did not see Roosevelt until about 15 days had passed.

=== Defense of polio diagnosis ===
John F. Ditunno, of the American Academy of Physical Medicine and Rehabilitation, Bruce E. Becker, and Gerald J. Herbison challenged the retrospective diagnosis of GBS primarily on the basis that several of the symptoms that Goldman highlighted as atypical in polio were quite typical in adult cases identified as polio. They noted that the form of GBS most resembling Roosevelt's symptoms is not otherwise known to require permanent wheelchair use. The authors concluded that Roosevelt's case provided sufficient information to differentiate his condition from GBS, and that the polio diagnosis was properly made by physicians familiar with the then-common disease.

=== Implications for prognosis ===
Biographer Jonathan Alter observed that "in any event, there was no cure for either disease in 1921." Levine mistakenly thought that the main benefit of a spinal tap, if done, would be to improve the outcome by lowering elevated cerebrospinal fluid (CSF) pressure. According to Tobin, some authors mistakenly believe that Roosevelt's paralysis, assuming a polio diagnosis, could have been prevented with early intervention. However, there is no objective evidence that a spinal tap lessens the possibility of paralysis in polio, and it is unlikely Roosevelt's physicians would have tried human serum injections into the CSF, or that such injections would have helped. Lovett did not think the injections were useful, and there were alarming meningeal symptoms associated with them, probably secondary to the formation of antigen-antibody complexes. Concerning GBS, virtually all of the effective measures that are standard practice for the medical management of GBS were not developed until many decades after Roosevelt's 1921 illness, so Roosevelt's prognosis would not have improved even if GBS had been diagnosed.

== See also ==
- Polio Hall of Fame
- Sunrise at Campobello (1958 play)
- Sunrise at Campobello (1960 film, based on the 1958 play)
- Eleanor and Franklin (1976 television miniseries)
- Warm Springs (2005 television film)
