= Justus F. Lehmann =

German-American physiatrist

Justus F. Lehmann MD (May 5, 1921 – April 28, 2006) was a German-American physiatrist. He was the founding chairperson of the Department of Rehabilitation Medicine at University of Washington School of Medicine. Lehmann headed the department from 1957 to 1986.

== Early years ==
Dr. Lehmann was born in Königsberg, Germany. He studied medicine at Johann Wolfgang Goethe University in Frankfurt and at the University of Leipzig.

== Medical Training ==
Dr. Lehmann was initially trained in internal medicine but became interested in physical modalities such as diathermy. This led him to study biophysics at the Max Planck Institute for Biophysics. In 1951 he moved to the United States to further pursue a study biophysics and physical medicine and rehabilitation (PM&R) at the Mayo Clinic, under the tutelage of Frank H. Krusen, MD.

== University of Washington ==
After two years as assistant professor and associate director of PM&R at Ohio State University, he was recruited to the University of Washington in 1957 to be professor and the founding chair of the Department of PM&R there. Under his direction the University of Washington PM&R Department has consistently been ranked among the top departments in the United States.

== Legacy ==
Dr. Lehmann was a prominent leader in physical medicine and rehabilitation, both nationally and internationally. During his distinguished career, Dr. Lehmann was the recipient of American Congress of Rehabilitation Medicine's Gold Key Award in 1971, the American Academy of Physical Medicine and Rehabilitation's Frank H. Krusen Award in 1983, and the Association of Academic Physiatrists’ Distinguished Member Award in 1993.
