= Finder's fee =

Compensation to an intermediary in a business transaction

In the United States, a finder's fee is the compensation given to an intermediary in a business transaction. Usually, there is a casual relationship between the one party and the intermediary (the finder), another relationship between the finder and the second party, and the two parties of the transaction would not have met if it were not for the work of the finder. Such compensation is common in business and is regulated by contractual agreements and law in the United States. A finder's fee can also be a gift from one party of the transaction, who feel morally obligated that the profits of the transaction be shared with the finder for making that transaction possible.

== See also ==
- Fee
- Lehman Formula
