= Lemann =

Lemann is a surname. Notable people with the surname include:

- Jorge Paulo Lemann (born 1939), Swiss-Brazilian businessman
- Nicholas Berthelot Lemann, American journalism professor and dean

== See also ==
- Lemann's Banksia (Latin: Banksia lemanniana)
- Lehmann
- Lehman
- Leman
