= Siegfried Lehman =

Siegfried Lehmann
- זיגפריד להמן
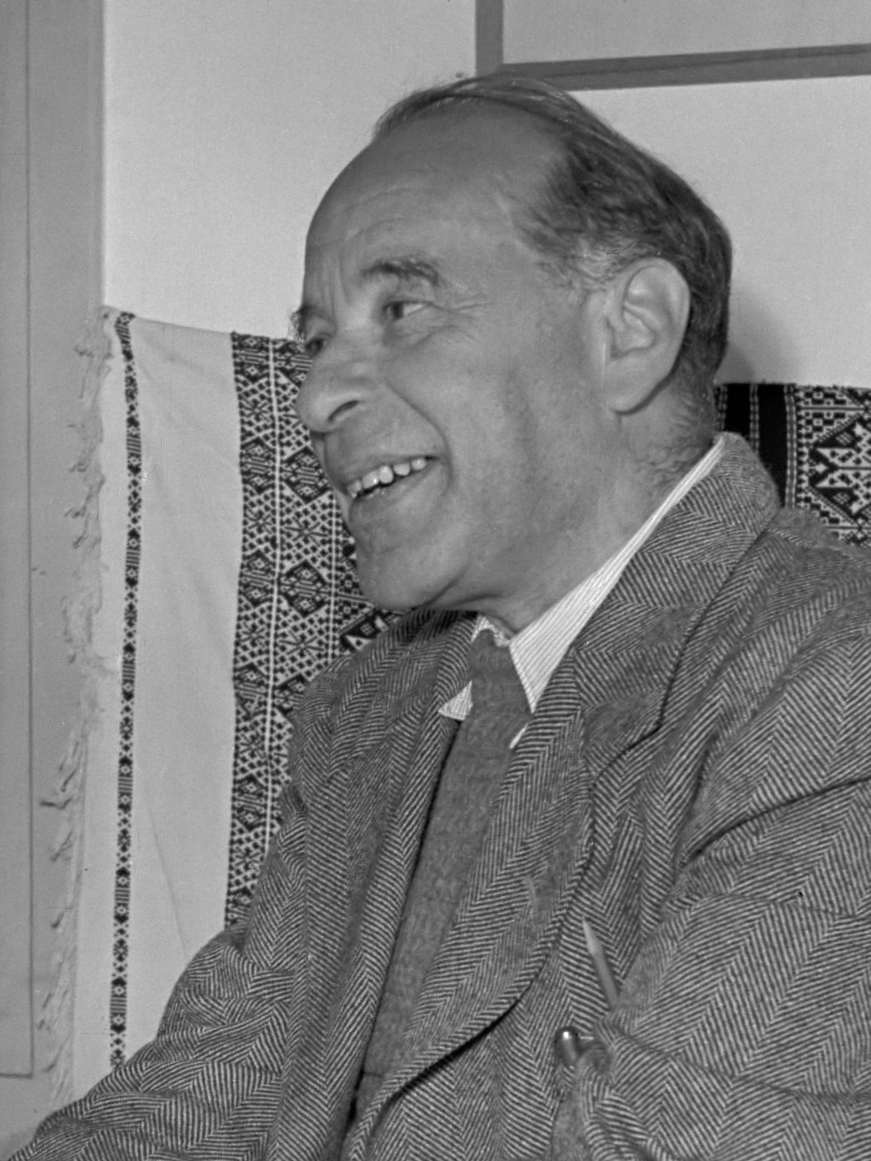
- Born: 4 January 1892; Berlin, Germany
- Died: 13 February 1958 (aged 66)

Siegfried Lehmann (Hebrew: זיגפריד להמן; 4 January 1892—13 June 1958) was an Israeli educator and founder and director of the Ben Shemen Youth Village.

== Biography ==
Lehmann was born in Berlin, Germany, in 1892 to an assimilated Jewish family. After finishing high school, he entered a medical school where he studied together with Albert Einstein. During World War I he served as a physician in the German Army. After the war he became a Zionist and a Socialist.

He founded a Jewish orphanage (Jüdisches Volksheim) in Berlin in 1916, and opened a shelter for Jewish war orphans in Kaunas in 1919. In 1927, he immigrated to Mandate Palestine, now Israel, and founded the Ben Shemen Youth Village, a large agricultural boarding school, situated adjacent to the moshav in Ben Shemen. He directed Ben Shemen Youth Village from 1927 to 1957 and received the 1957 Israel Prize in Education for it. In 1940, he was imprisoned by the British Mandate authorities because they found arms depots at the village (the "Ben Shemen trial"). He died in 1958.

== Awards ==
- In 1957, Lehmann was awarded the Israel Prize in education.

== See also ==
- List of Israel Prize recipients
- Lehman

Chazon Umoreshet, Biography by Aya Lehman Schlair in Hebrew,2010
