= Lehman High School =

Lehman High School may refer to:

- Lehman Catholic High School, Sidney, Ohio
- Lehman High School (Canton, Ohio)
- Lehman High School (Texas)
- Lake-Lehman Jr. Sr. High, Luzerne County, Pennsylvania
- Herbert H. Lehman High School, Bronx, New York
- High School of American Studies at Lehman College, Bronx, New York

== See also ==
- Lehman (disambiguation)
