= Kachhwa Road railway station =

Railway Station in Uttar Pradesh, India

General information
- Location: Kachhwa, Uttar Pradesh; India
- Coordinates: 25.251°N 82.707°E
- Elevation: 88 metres (289 ft)
- System: Indian Railways station
- Owner: Indian Railways
- Platforms: 2
- Tracks: 4 (single diesel broad gauge)
- Connections: Auto stand

Construction
- Structure type: Standard (on-ground station)
- Parking: No
- Cycle facilities: No

Other information
- Status: Functioning
- Station code: KWH
- Zone(s): North Eastern Railway
- Division(s): Varanasi
- Fare zone: North Eastern Railway
Location
- Location within India Location within Uttar Pradesh

Kachhwa Road railway station is a small railway station in Mirzapur district, Uttar Pradesh. Its code is KWH. It serves Kachhwa city. The station consists of two platforms. The platform is not well sheltered. It lacks many facilities including water and sanitation.

== Trains ==
- Allahabad City–Manduadih (Morning) Passenger (unreserved)
- Allahabad City–Manduadih Passenger (unreserved)
- Allahabad City–Mau DEMU
