= Geoffrey D. Lehmann =

British missionary (1904–1994)

Geoffrey D. Lehmann (12 January 1904 – 15 April 1994) was an English religious and medical missionary founded and built the Herbertpur Christian Hospital along with his wife Monica Lehmann, in the village of Herbertpur, located in the Doon Valley in India in 1936. The hospital is now operated as the EHA Herbertpur Christian Hospital and includes the nursing school.

The aim of his mission was to spread the Christian faith among a largely Hindu and Muslim population in Herbertpur and surrounding areas as well as to provide medical care and treatment at extremely cheap or no cost to the villagers.

Lehmann was born in 1904 in London and attended prep school as a child. He later trained as an engineer from Oxford University, after which he pursued medicine from the same university. Lehmann specialized in ophthalmology and tropical medicine, but carried out a wide range of surgical and consultation treatments in the Herbertpur Hospital.

He also served as the Chairman of Board of Governors at Wynberg Allen School.

== Early life ==
Lehmann was born on 12 January 1904 near the Alexandra Palace in London, England. His family resided on a farm near Sherwood in Nottinghamshire, where they raised chickens, ducks, turkeys, cows and more animals. As a child, Lehmann's parents tried to raise him with wholesome experiences, as he enjoyed many different past-times such as: watching the Queen's servants on the royal grounds, enjoying nature, and watching the family's chauffeur turn on their steam engines.

Growing up, Lehmann was a member of England's Children's Special Service Mission, a youth evangelism group also referred to as CSSM. Lehmann took interest in the missionaries who frequented his childhood home. However, after a bad encounter with a Scandinavian worker, Lehmann decided that he no longer want to be a missionary. As a young boy, Lehmann believed in the Christian doctrine, but he did not like that parents tend to over-shelter their children from the world.

== Education ==
Lehmann attended the Plymouth Brethren Primary School, a prep school which was operated by strict adherent of the Plymouth Brethren. Lehmann was sufficiently exposed to Christian teachings as part of his primary education.

He trained as an engineer in the Oxford University and graduated with a Bachelor of Science degree in civil and mechanical engineering.

He then trained in medicine from Liverpool University Medical School and travelled to the US to intern at the Manhattan Eye, Ear and Throat Hospital to study with Dr. Chester Mayo.

Lehmann practiced corneal grafting at Boston Hospital before returning to Liverpool to study tropical medicine.

== Personal life ==
As the age of twelve, Lehmann met Monica Allen while on a holiday. They had become good friends, but Lehmann initially had no thought of marrying Monica, as she wanted to one day return to India as a missionary.

When finishing up his doctorate education in engineering, Lehmann felt a sudden need of a spiritual refresher. He decided to attend the Keswick convention, where the speakers discussed the global need for medical missionaries. At the time, Lehmann felt like God was speaking to him and that this was his calling. When Lehmann came to this realization, he realized that he and Monica must have been destined to be with each other, as Monica dreamed of being a missionary from a young age.

Lehmann and Monica had three daughters and one son. Their first child, Priscilla Ruth, was born in Kachhwa. Petronella Anna was born in March 1937, Donald in May 1940, and Susana Joan in December 1946. At a young age, both Priscilla and Petrinilla were sent to London as there were no school in Herbertpur to educate them.

== Missionary work ==
On their arrival in India, Dr. Lehmann and his wife first worked in a hospital in Kachhwa. Lehmann worked in Kacchwa for 18 months where his daily routine included operations in the mornings and afternoon with routine check-ups in between and language study in the evening. In Kachhwa, the Lehmanns distributed Christian literature for a small fee.

The Lehmanns established the Herbertpur Hospital in November 1936, in Herbertpur village, 25 miles away from Dehradun. The hospital became popular amongst locals in a short period of time and was visited by over 2000 people daily shortly after its opening. The hospital was mainly visited by low-income people from backward classes but catered to people from all socio-economic classes including Brahmins, farmers and merchants.

By 1937, the Lehmanns built a larger building for the hospital and treated nearly 3000 patients a day along with their staff.

During the second world war, the hospital was closed for nearly a year due to limitation of staff and because Dr. Lehmann was himself asked to serve in the war front.

The hospital reopened in 1954, with two operating theaters, special eye wards, male and female general wards, midwifery and tuberculosis block and private rooms. Dr. Lehmann carried out treatments as complex as cataract removal surgery, appendectomy, and blood infection treatments at the Herbertpur Hospital.

In addition to medical services, the hospital also exposed to patients to Christianity during their stay in the hospital. Gospel service was carried out daily in the hospital yard by the hospital's evangelist, Mr. Mall. Lehmann also often included himself in the service for he felt that his involvement would mean a lot to the patients and would help in strengthening their beliefs.

Dr. Lehmann along with his wife also established a number of schools in the region. These also served as establishments for congregation. Dr. Lehmann also worked with the Evangelical Alliance Mission and served as the chairman on board of governors for the Wynberg Allen School. This school provided education to children form displaced Tibetan families living in the Himalayan valley.

== Opposition ==
Throughout his time in India, Lehmann faced opposition for trying to convert Indians to Christianity. In general, there was a lack of enthusiasm about Christianity—even from local Christians—as Indians did not like talking about the crucifixion. From time to time, the hospital and the school were able to influence locals to convert, however, when the villagers would return to their home, some inevitable turned away from Christianity due to the local opposition and resistance.

Multiple parties pressured missionaries in India, such as the Arya Samahajhists, one of the more violent group of protesters. At one point, even the District Magistrate told Lehmann that they would close down his hospital if he continued to preach about Christianity, as he was considered to be taking advantage of those who needed medical help. Despite the opposition, Lehmann continued to preach and distributed Christian literature and films to connect with the people. Most medical evangelists gave full attention to their medical work and left missionary work for the local evangelists. However, Lehmann believed that paying attention to people's souls was just as important as healing them physically, and took a liking to the title "Missionary Medic."

== Legacy ==
The Herbertpur Hospital became a member of the Emmanuel Hospital Association (EHA) in 1973 and continues to serve patients across the Doon valley to this day.

The Lehmanns established the Herbertpur Trust to encourage national evangelism programs.

Dr. Geoffrey Lehmann's life and work were the subject of The Himalayan Heartbeat, a book written by Ken Anderson, which was published in 1965.
