= Geriatric rehabilitation =

Healthcare specialization

Geriatric rehabilitation or geriatric physical therapy is the branch of medicine that studies rehabilitation and physical therapy issues in elderly.

== Origins ==
Geriatric rehabilitation covers three areas – normal aging due to disuse and deconditioning, cardiovascular problems like vascular disease and stroke, and skeletal problems including osteoporosis and osteoarthritis conditions such as knee and hip replacements. Physical therapists [physiotherapists], who are rehabilitation specialists in human movement, use rehabilitation to work toward the goal of returning the patient to a pre-injury state.

With increased age, patients often face many physical and emotional changes that can affect level of physical, mental, social function and well-being. Rehabilitation maintains functional independence in the elderly. Rehabilitation of geriatric patients is imperative for the patients' well-being and for society, so that we can thrive socially and economically. Essential to geriatric rehabilitation is communication, specifically improving any sensory impairment, including those related to vision and hearing. The prevention of falls and osteoporosis can improve the patient's health and longevity. Addressing malnutrition can promote healing and vitalize the patient to participate in a formal rehabilitation program. Depression is common in the older population if a functional loss of mobility and an inability to perform activities of daily living (ADLs) predominates. Cognitive impairment, such as delirium and dementia, can affect the patient's rehabilitation goals and outcomes. Finally, a driver's evaluation for an appropriate elderly candidate is an underutilized part of rehabilitation that has a considerable impact on society.

Geriatric rehabilitation also have a role in intermediate care, where patients are referred by a hospital or family doctor, when there is a requirement to provide hospital based short term intensive physical therapy aimed at the recovery of musculoskeletal function, particularly recovery from joint, tendon, or ligament repair and, or, physical medicine and rehabilitation care when elderly patients get out of sync with their medication resulting in a deterioration of their personal health which reduces their ability to live independently.

Finally, geriatric rehabilitation has a large influence on the growing life expectancy around the globe. The American Physical Therapy Association (APTA) surveyed 556 adults over 65 years old in order to gain an understanding on the factors that affect adherence to an exercise program. Adherence to an exercise program influences frailty, speed, ability to live independently, and best of all, life expectancy. The study compared two factors: exercise barriers and motivation. The study concluded that exercise barriers play the largest role in determining adherence to a home exercise program (HEP). One way to compensate for this is with eHealth interventions, which allows the therapist to see the patient's home environment and keep them motivated without having to leave their home, senior housing apartments, skilled nursing facilities, palliative, hospice or home-based care facility. According to APTA, motivators include self-efficacy, the ability to control behavior, and outcome expectation, the belief that consequences follow certain actions. APTA describes barriers as: insufficient time, lack of social support, no place to exercise, limited finances, no transportation, and the fear of falling. Researchers recently found that depression, stress levels, increased age, decreased health status and lack of pleasure while exercising contribute to exercise adherence. eHealth is an effective alternative for the geriatric population. However, of the 40 studies done, 10% found that cognitive, physical, or visual impairments can prove difficult to use eHealth.
