= George Draper (physician) =

American physician (1880–1959)

Dr. George Draper (May 21, 1880 – July 1, 1959) was an American physician. He was affiliated with Columbia University College of Physicians and Surgeons and NewYork–Presbyterian Hospital. Most famously known as Franklin Delano Roosevelt's personal doctor, Draper was also a well known constitutionalist and eugenicist. Draper was a key figure in developing a constitutional view of medicine during the 20th century.

== Constitutionalism ==
Constitutionalism was a movement in medicine away from the "one size fits all diagnosis" and towards re-introducing the individual into the medical diagnosis. Constitutionalist like Draper placed importance on aspects of a patient's constitution – this included heredity, their environment, and their personality. A patient's constitution played a larger role in diagnosis than in previous methods.

Draper received funding from the Rockefeller Foundation for his Constitution Clinic in New York City. Draper sought to study chronic diseases and relate them to certain constitutions, believing that through an evaluation of a patient's constitution, doctors would be able to give better diagnoses and decide on better treatments.

During this period, genetics began to emerge as a field, as medicine began to solve the problem of infectious diseases and moved on to new issues. Draper folded heredity right into his view on constitution, appreciating the effect that heredity had on one's constitution.

=== The Relationship of Human Constitution to Disease ===
Draper wrote many papers on his theories of how constitution related to disease. Draper believed that the susceptibility to disease is as important and worth of study as the disease itself. He also countered the importance of disease itself – medicine had been focused on classifying disease ever since the rise of hospital medicine in the early 1800s, and Draper called back instead to a prior time, when humoral theory and the individual were more important in a medical diagnosis. Draper defined a disease not as its own entity but as a thing carried by an individual, similar to humoral theory.

Draper defined constitution as follows:

Constitution is that aggregate of hereditarial characters, influenced more or less by the environment, which determines the individuals' reaction, successful or unsuccessful, to the stress of environment."

Draper considered himself a naturalist, and was a devout follower of Darwin. As a naturalist, Draper insisted on a complete study of the human body when regarding disease and constitution. He believed focusing on specific disease and labeling them generally led to problems, and believed that a complete study of the individual was necessary for proper diagnosis and treatment.

Draper defined the four aspects on constitution as anatomy, physiology, psychology, and immunity. Draper took these four "panels" of personality and would analyze them for large populations from his clinic and found certain combinations and repetitive patterns. His interpretation of his data led him to believe that given a single panel of a patient; he could determine the other three panels based on the one panel alone. Draper believed in the extreme specificity of one's constitution. Draper valued the findings of physiognomists and phrenologists in relating morphology to constitution and so to disease.

In relating constitution to classifying mankind, Draper was hesitant to classify mankind based on race, geography, and skin color – as many of his colleagues and other eugenicists did. Instead, Draper introduced a concept of classifying the human race based on disease susceptibility. Draper believe that race and geography differences between men made very little difference, and it was rather their disease susceptibility that set them apart. In studies, Draper noticed that one's race did not directly relate to one's disease susceptibility, and suggested that people reorganize how they saw race. He understood that this would not work socially or politically, but stressed that it was a distinctive factor among mankind. Draper did find evidence for sex being a major factor in constitution.

=== Eugenics ===
Draper was close with many eugenicists, despite stressing the importance of environment on one's constitution. He was a member of the Galton Society, that of Francis Galton, the father of eugenics. He was also peers with Charles Davenport and Harry Laughlin of the Eugenics Record Office, and later joined the Eugenics Research Association at Cold Spring Harbor.

== Draper and Roosevelt ==
Draper was best known as President Franklin Delano Roosevelt's personal physician. Aside from his Constitutional Clinic, Draper was a well-known expert in polio, and personally attended to Roosevelt after his return from Campobello more than a month after the onset of his 1921 paralytic illness. Draper's focus in treatment was the psychological aspect. Another client was William O. Douglas, who later became a Supreme Court justice.

== Personal life ==
Draper was married to the interior designer Dorothy Draper.
