= American Academy of Physical Medicine and Rehabilitation =

The American Academy of Physical Medicine and Rehabilitation (AAPM&R) is the national medical specialty society in the United States for physicians who specialize in physical medicine and rehabilitation (PM&R). These physicians are called "physiatrists" or "rehabilitation physicians". Founded in 1938, AAPM&R also offers education, advocates for PM&R, and promotes PM&R research.

AAPM&R has more than 8,000 members representing a majority of the physiatrists in the United States and 37 countries. The organization is led by a board of governors which includes the president, past president, president-elect, vice president, secretary, treasurer, members-at-large and strategic co-ordinating committee chairs. The executive director is among the ex officio liaisons to the board.

== History ==
PM&R began in the 1930s as a way to treat musculoskeletal and neurological conditions. PM&R took a lead role after World War II when disabled veterans or soldiers with physical impairments returned home. The specialty quickly grew as it attempted to help veterans restore function and return to their daily lives. In addition, during the 1940s and early 1950s physiatrists played a pivotal role in the treatment of individuals with poliomyelitis.

Then called the American Society of Physical Therapy Physicians, AAPM&R was founded in 1938 in Chicago at the annual meeting of the American Congress of Physical Medicine. Walter Zeiter, MD, was elected executive director (a position he held for 22 years) and John S. Coulter, MD, was elected as the first president. In 1939, the society was formalized in New York City. The society had 40 charter members including the PM&R pioneer Frank H. Krusen, MD, who was AAPM&R president from 1941 to 1942. Membership was by invitation only and was limited to fixed 100 doctors until 1944. In 1944, the society's name was changed to the American Society of Physical Medicine. In 1951, it became the American Society of Physical Medicine and Rehabilitation. The Academy's current name was adopted in 1955.

== Membership ==
AAPM&R offers several membership categories depending upon an individual's credentials. Physicians who are board-certified in PM&R (as determined by the American Board of Physical Medicine and Rehabilitation, a certifying board of the American Board of Medical Specialties) are "Fellow" members. There are also categories for residents, international physicians, medical students and academic researchers.

AAPM&R's membership reflects the diversity of the specialty of PM&R. Member physicians may treat amputations, pain (neck, nerve, arthritic, back), injuries (brain, spinal cord, sports-related), rehabilitation (cardiac, geriatric, pediatric) and more. Some physiatrists treat multiple conditions while others may focus on specific areas of interest. Physiatrists' practices also vary. While some practice in hospitals and rehabilitation centers, others work in private practices or with other types of physicians (for example, orthopedic surgeons, family physicians).

Recognizing the diversity of the specialty and its membership, the academy established member councils in 2009. The councils bring together clinical segments of the membership in communities: central nervous system rehabilitation, musculoskeletal medicine, medical rehabilitation, pain medicine/neuromuscular medicine and pediatric rehabilitation/developmental disabilities.

== Previous leadership ==
1938–1939: John S. Coulter, MD
1939–1940: F.H. Ewerhardt, MD
1940–1941: William Bierman, MD
1941–1942: Frank H Krusen, MD
1942–1943: K.G. Hansson, MD
1943–1944: William H. Schmidt, MD
1944–1946: Fred B. Moor, MD
1946–1947: William D. Paul, MD
1947–1948: Earl C. Elkins, MD
1948–1949: Arthur E. White, MD
1949–1950: Charles O. Molander
1950–1951: Miland E. Knapp, MD
1951–1952: Frances Baker, MD
1952–1953: Walter S. McClellan, MD
1953–1954: Donald L. Rose
1954–1955: Harold Dinken, MD
1955–1956: Ben L. Boynton
1956–1957: Murray B. Ferderber
1957–1958: George D. Wilson, MD
1958–1959: Louis B. Newman, MD
1959–1960: Clarence W. Dail, MD
1960–1961: Ray Piaskoski
1961–1962: Robery W. Boyle
1962–1963: Max K. Newman, MD
1963–1964: Morton Hoberman, MD
1964–1965: Herman L. Rudolph, MD
1965–1966: A.B.C. Knudson, MD
1966–1967: Michael M. Dacso, MD
1967–1968: Robert C. Darling, MD
1968–1969: G. Keith Stillwell, MD
1969–1970: Herman J. Bearzy, MD
1970–1971: Glenn Gullickson, Jr., MD
1971–1972: Arthur S. Abramson, MD
1972–1973: Justus F. Lehmann, MD
1973–1974: Leonard F. Bender, MD
1974–1975: Eugene Moskowitz, MD
1975–1976: Carl V. Granger, MD
1976–1977: Ernest W. Johnson, MD
1977–1978: Joseph Goodgold, MD
1978–1979: Frederic J. Kottke, MD
1979–1980: Joseph C. Honet, MD
1980–1981: William M. Fowler, Jr., MD
1981–1982: John F. Ditunno, Jr., MD
1982–1983: Murray M. Freed, MD
1983–1984: Arthur E. Grant, MD
1984–1985: George H. Kraft, MD
1985–1986: Myron M. LaBan, MD
1986–1987: Richard S. Materson, MD
1987–1988: Joachim L. Opitz, MD*
1988–1989: Barbara J. de Lateur, MD
1989–1990: Erwin G. Gonzalez, MD
1990–1991: James T. Demopoulos, MD
1991–1992: Ian C. MacLean, MD
1992–1993: Leon Reinstein, MD
1993–1994: Robert P. Christopher, MD
1994–1995: Martin Grabois, MD
1995–1996: Randall L. Braddom, MD, MS
1996–1997: James R. Swenson, MD
1997–1998: Barry S. Smith, MD
1998–1999: John L. Melvin, MD
1999–2000: Robert J. Weber, MD
2000–2001: Gail L. Gamble, MD
2001–2002: Thomas E. Strax, MD
2002–2003: Daniel Dumitru, MD, PhD
2003–2004: Claire V. Wolfe, MD
2004–2005: Bruce M. Gans, MD
2005–2006: Steve M. Gnatz, MD, MHA
2006–2007: Joel M. Press, MD
2007–2008: David X. Cifu, MD
2008–2009: William F. Micheo, MD
2009–2010: M. Elizabeth Sandel, MD
2010–2011: Michael F. Lupinacci, MD
2011–2012: David L. Bagnall, MD
2012–2013: Alberto Esquenazi, MD
2013–2014: Kurtis M. Hoppe, MD
2014–2015: Kathleen R. Bell, MD
2015–2016: Gregory M. Worsowicz, MD, MBA
2016–2017: Steve R. Geiringer, MD
2017–2018: Darryl L. Kaelin, MD
2018–2019: Peter C. Esselman, MD
2019–2020: Michelle S. Gittler, MD
2020–2021: Stuart M. Weinstein, MD
2021–2022: Deborah A. Venesy, MD
2022–2023: Steven R. Flanagan, MD

== Education ==
Since 1939, the academy has held an Annual Assembly each fall. As the largest meeting of physiatrists in the world, the assembly attracts nearly 2,000 attendees each year. The meeting offers an educational program with PM&R-specific workshops that offer continuing medical education (CME) as well as a job fair and exhibit hall. In addition to the Annual Assembly, the Academy holds several other live courses and workshops covering musculoskeletal ultrasound, spinal procedures, coding and billing, and spasticity and dystonia.

To help members obtain CME online, AAPM&R launched acadeME in 2008. The education portal allows physiatrists to access CME activities online. It includes courses, slide lectures, case studies, podcasts and self-study materials.

== Advocacy ==
AAPM&R monitors federal legislative and regulatory health policy and private sector market trends affecting both the health care and insurance industries. The academy also seeks to position the specialty strategically in the quality environment; advocates for increased responsiveness of research to the rehabilitation needs of people with physical disabilities and the professionals who provide services to them; works to expand practice management services for members; and advocates on behalf of members' professional interests. The academy works in collaboration with other physicians' specialty organizations on a range of professional practice issues including practice management and administrative simplification. The academy has taken a lead role in advocating for the rehabilitation of wounded service men and women and disabled veterans returning from the Iraq and Afghanistan conflicts. Many returning veterans have severe disabilities such as traumatic brain injury. The academy advocates for these individuals through alliances with the United States Department of Veterans Affairs, participation in congressional symposiums, and meetings with staff.

The academy advocates for the needs of patients and physiatrists' ability to deliver the care they need. For example, iy works toward the long-term goal of passing legislation that will remove admissions quotas and return the physiatrist to the position of freely determining what type of rehabilitation is medically necessary for any given patient. In addition to its efforts as a national society, it places a priority on assisting physiatrists at the state level through grassroots advocacy on critical practice issues. The academy encourages members to be involved with their state PM&R societies to organize and develop a strong lobbying infrastructure. In addition, it co-ordinates member "Calls to Action" through its Advocacy Action Center.

== Awards ==
The AAPM&R makes several awards to different doctors each year in different categories.

- The Frank H. Krusen, MD, Lifetime Achievement Award
- The Distinguished Clinician Award
- The Distinguished Member Award
- The Distinguished Public Service Award
- PASSOR Legacy Award and Lectureship
- Outstanding Council Service Awards

== Publications ==
In 2009, the academy launched PM&R, a monthly, peer-reviewed, scientific journal. Published by Elsevier, it provides research and education directly related to PM&R topics and emphasizes principles of injury, function and rehabilitation.

The Physiatrist is the official publication of AAPM&R. The print newsletter is distributed to all members ten times a year and includes updates on legislation, education, jobs and products or programs related to PM&R and the academy.

The e-newsletter, AAPM&R Connection, was launched in 2008. It provides information to members.

== See also ==
- Performing Arts Medicine
