= Lehman's Hardware =

Hardware store in Kidron, Ohio

Lehman's is a retail store located in Kidron, Ohio. Originally specializing in products used by the Amish community, it has become known worldwide as a source for non-electric goods. The 35,000-square-foot (3,300 m^{2}) facility bills itself as a "Low Tech Superstore" and a "Purveyor of Historical Technology", both of which are reflected in their motto, "For a Simpler Life". The quarter-mile-long structure is made up of the remnants of a log cabin and three pre-Civil War buildings, including a hand-hewn barn. It is also a popular tourist destination. There is also a print catalog and online business.

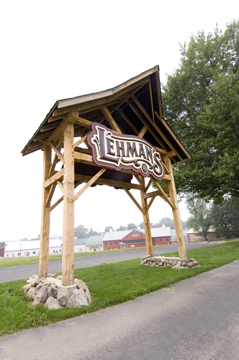
View of the Lehman's Hardware campus from the main entrance

== Location ==
Lehman's is located in Kidron, Ohio, an unincorporated community in Wayne County, Ohio. It is located in a tri-county area of Northeast Ohio that is home to the nation's largest population of Amish, some 56,000 in number. Its location made it a natural place from which to do business with the area's Amish population, and its proximity to U.S. Route 30 has also made it a popular stop among tourists who are visiting Amish Country.

== History ==
Jay Lehman, an area businessman, founded Lehman's Hardware (now called "Lehman's") in 1955 with the intent of selling non-electrical products to the Amish community. He began the business by purchasing a combination hardware store and gasoline filling station that had been in business since 1915.

The store did a modest business, with a mild boost from tourism, until the 1973 oil crisis. As domestic supplies of oil began to dwindle, people began to look for low-tech equipment to help them deal with the shortages. According to Jay Lehman, "The oil embargo put us on the map." The oil crisis secured the store's reputation, with each new disaster or potential disaster bringing in new customers. Other events that increased Lehman's customer base include the Year 2000 problem, the September 11, 2001, attacks, and the northeast blackout of 2003.

As a result of this change, there has been a marked shift in the demographic makeup of Lehman's customers. In the early years, the Amish community accounted for 95 percent of Lehman's sales. As of 2007, it made up between 6 and 8 percent.

Besides the Amish, tourists, and jittery citizens, the store is a resource for homesteaders, missionaries, environmentalists, survivalists, and doctors in developing countries, to purchase items needed for simple living. Lehman's also counts among its customers the American Red Cross and Peace Corps volunteers, and Hollywood set designers also use the store to find historically accurate items for decorating period sets.

The Akron Beacon Journal reported in 2011 that though now in his eighties, Jay Lehman was still serving as chairman of the business and came to the store every day to interact with customers. The business side was now by his son Galen, who started working at the store in his teens and is now retired. Jay Lehman's daughter, Glenda Lehman Ervin, currently serves as the store's Director of Marketing after working many years at a large corporation. Jay Lehman died in July 2020, having continued working at Lehman's with reduced responsibilities until earlier the same year. In Lehman's joined HRM Enterprises, Inc. on February 1, 2021. HRM's family of businesses include Hartville Hardware, Hartville Kitchen Restaurant and Bakery, Hartville Marketplace and Flea Market, The Shops at Hartville Kitchen and Top Advantage Surfaces.

== Physical expansion ==
The Lehman's store added a number of expansions over the years, often in a piecemeal fashion. However, in 2007, the store doubled in size to 35,000 square feet (3,300 m^{2}) - about 1/4 the size of a typical Target store. Lehman's built most of this addition inside an 1849 barn moved from Orrville, Ohio, and reassembled at the store site, using the original hand-hewn timbers and wooden pegs. Lehman's asked an Amish-staffed construction company to perform the deconstruction and reconstruction to honor the store's Amish heritage and give the structure the same integrity as it had when first built. In 2012, Lehman's updated the front of their store, restoring it to the business's original look when it first opened in 1955.

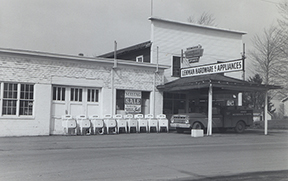
The storefront of Lehman's Hardware as it appeared circa 1955

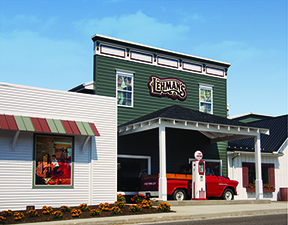
The storefront of Lehman's Hardware after the 2012 remodeling, which was intended to make it resemble the original 1955 look

== Manufacturer and distributor ==
As the store did business, it often found it difficult to find suppliers of certain items as manufacturers quit making the obsolete technology or went out of business. This forced Lehman's to look other places to develop new suppliers or become their own supplier.

In the case of cast iron wood-burning parlor stoves, the Amish only accept the product in black, so Lehman's arranges special manufacturer runs, typically buying a three-year supply at a time.

Lehman's also deals in replacement parts for many of their products, tracking them down from individual manufacturers, or at times reverse engineering them. When there is a lack of manufacturers for needed parts, they often obtain the casting parts and hire out the work, or do the manufacturing themselves, frequently without regard to profit.

== "High tech to sell low tech" ==
Lehman's has always embraced modern technology in order to promote their products and their store. Because of this, sales through the company's website and catalog now account for 60% of the store's revenue. They send an estimated 4,000–5,000 packages each week as a result of their online sales.

The store also has a Facebook page with more than 100,000 fans, and Galen Lehman's Twitter account has more than 2,600 followers. Their YouTube channel has more than 100 videos, including one of a store employee explaining how to use a wood stove that has received more than 600,000 hits.

"For many years, we were a store with a catalog," said Glenda Lehman Ervin, "now we're a direct sales company with a store."

== Relationship with Amish community ==
Many Amish served by the Lehman stores are now vendors, building 40 to 50 of the products that Lehman's sells.

Lehman's ability to tap into the Amish tradition of craftsmanship came from its decades-long commitment to providing the Amish with the goods they needed to maintain their lifestyle. In turn, now Amish craftsmen provide Lehman's with exclusive lines of products that would otherwise vanish.

The needs of the Amish community still remain a priority at the store, and Lehman's often refuses to defer their needs to meet those of fad or panic buyers.

== Tourist attraction ==
Besides their line of products and their location in Amish country, tourists are also attracted to Lehman's because of the museum-like quality of the store. Some tourists mistakenly think the store sells antiques, but all of the products sold are new, historically accurate replicas. Actual period pieces are on display throughout the store. There is also an area where workers demonstrate the use of old-fashioned tools called the Buggy Barn, a bookstore that also shows films on Amish life for visitors, a cafe, and the Soda Pop Shop, which features more than 300 kinds of soft drinks and 70 kinds of root beer.

Lehman's popularity has made it an important tourist destination in Northeast Ohio's Amish Country. Some 4,000 visitors come on a typical Saturday, while the annual figure is around 500,000.

== Non-electric products ==
Lehman's claims they are the world's largest supplier of Non-Electric goods. The items offered range from traditional or historical items, such as wood heat stoves or the Reading 78 Apple Peeler, to more contemporary emergency items such as crank powered radios and flashlights.

== Motion pictures using period merchandise ==
In the late 1980s, Lehman's discovered a new market for their products when they were contacted by a property master trying to locate a cast iron stove for the film Back to the Future Part III. Since the 1990 release of that film, Lehman's has provided historic period props for a number of different films and television series.

== Flood and recovery ==
On February 28, 2011, the North Fork Creek, part of which runs beneath the Lehman's store, overflowed its banks, flash flooding the store. The 50-year flood was caused by thawing temperatures, an ice and snow pack that clogged a five-foot culvert that drained water away from the store site, and a storm that brought 1/2 inch of rain in less than 15 minutes.

The flood sent 18 inches (46 cm) of muddy water through the business that crested at 3 feet (0.91 m) in some parts of the structure. The water moved so quickly that it carried an 18-cubic-foot refrigerator across the length of the store. Without flood insurance, Lehman's was left to absorb an estimated $100,000 in damage.

As the flood occurred in the early morning hours of the day and lasted less than three hours, Lehman's employees were advised to report to work dressed for cleanup. Hearing word of the flood, many members of the community turned out to help, offering labor, equipment or food for the workers. Because of this, Lehman's was able to open their doors on a limited basis thirty hours later.

Over the course of the next week, the store reopened different departments each day. By Saturday, March 5, all but two were in operation, in time for a local machinery auction that brought many customers into Kidron. At that time, Lehman's began a sale, deeply discounting products that were cosmetically damaged but functional, or whose packaging was damaged by the rising water.

The wood-burning stove department, which was the most heavily damaged by the flood, was the last to reopen. It did so on April 9, 2011.
