= Gunnar Lehmann =

German politician (born 1993)

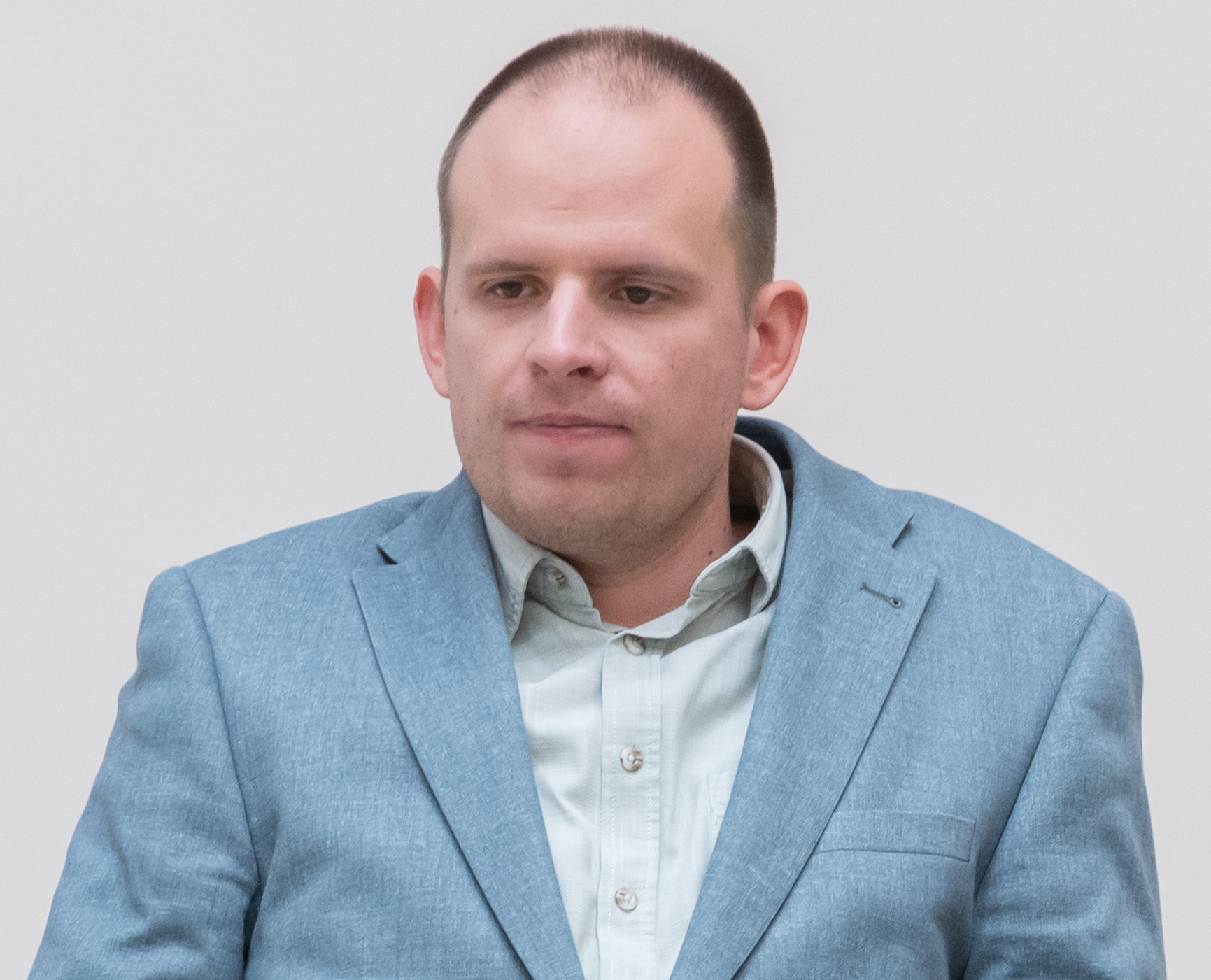
- Lehmann in 2025

Member of the Landtag of Brandenburg
- Incumbent
- Assumed office 17 October 2024

Personal details
- Born: 8 September 1993 (age 32)
- Party: Sahra Wagenknecht Alliance (since 2024)
- Other political affiliations: Die Linke (2018–2023)

Gunnar Lehmann (born 8 September 1993) is a German politician serving as a member of the Landtag of Brandenburg since 2024. He is the spokesperson for agriculture, environment, consumer protection, rural areas and European affairs of the Sahra Wagenknecht Alliance group in the Landtag.
