= Jacob Heinrich Wilhelm Lehmann =

German astronomer (1800–1863)

Jacob Heinrich Wilhelm Lehmann (3 January 1800 – 17 July 1863) was a German astronomer. His specialty was computational astronomy, and at the time he was widely known and recognized within his field. He is most noted today as the namesake for the crater Lehmann on the Moon.
