= Lehman Township, Pennsylvania =

Lehman Township is the name of some places in the U.S. state of Pennsylvania:

- Lehman Township, Luzerne County, Pennsylvania
- Lehman Township, Pike County, Pennsylvania
