= Frank H. Krusen =

20th century American psychiatrist

Frank H. Krusen (June 26, 1898 – September 16, 1973) was an American physiatrist. He is regarded as a "founder" of the field of physical medicine and rehabilitation. He founded the first Department of Rehabilitation at Temple Hospital in 1928. Physiatrists remember his scholarly contributions, most notably through his numerous contributions to the medical literature on the use of therapeutic modalities in medicine, and his foundational textbook, Physical Medicine, published in 1941 and subsequently titled, Krusen's Handbook of Physical Medicine and Rehabilitation, the fourth and last edition of which was published in 1990.

Krusen was a driving force behind the establishment of the first residency program in Physical Medicine at Mayo Clinic in 1936. He was also a charter member of the American Academy of Physical Medicine and Rehabilitation (AAPM&R) and served as its president from 1941-1942. His focused on the field on education, research, and collaboration with other colleagues in medicine and rehabilitation services, a framework for professional activities that remains relevant for PM&R in the 21st century.

== Early life and education ==
Frank Hammond Krusen was born in Philadelphia, Pennsylvania, on June 26, 1898. His father was a professor of obstetrics and gynecology at Jefferson Medical College who also served as the director of public health in Philadelphia. His mother was a practicing Quaker, and young Frank grew up in a family that prized education and instilled in him the value of service to the community. Krusen chose a career in medicine, and, when he graduated from Jefferson Medical College in 1921, he pursued further training in general surgery.

Krusen's career trajectory deviated from a predictable course when he was diagnosed with pulmonary tuberculosis during his surgical residency training. Forced to withdraw from training, he spent five months at the Cresson Tuberculosis Sanitorium in central Pennsylvania. This experience with the “rest cure” and “fresh air” used for treating tuberculosis at the time stimulated his interest in the use of physical agents in medicine. Krusen also was judged unable to continue in surgical training because of a vulnerability to ether fumes. In any case, when Krusen was well enough to return to his medical training, he changed his career path to physical medicine, a branch of medicine that was just beginning to develop in the United States.

== Career ==
=== Temple University Medical School ===
After returning to Philadelphia at the age of 28 years, Krusen was appointed associate dean of Temple University Medical School in North Philadelphia in 1926. Temple's medical school at that time was a struggling institution. Labeled “embryonic” in the Flexner Report of 1910, a critical survey of American medical schools sponsored by the American Medical Association (AMA), it provided an opportunity for Krusen to demonstrate his innate leadership ability, and he quickly developed organizational and political skills to improve the school's rating. He required just 2 years to raise the necessary funds to build a new medical school, overhaul the curriculum, establish clinical clerkships, and garner a “Type A” rating by the AMA.

Krusen continued his studies in physical therapy and physical medicine, foreseeing the application of his knowledge to a broad array of clinical conditions. He published extensively on the use of physical agents in medical treatment. He was an early advocate of using physical therapy techniques for injured athletes and became the team physician for the Temple University football team, the first “sports medicine” physiatrist.

=== Mayo Clinic ===
In 1935, an opportunity arose for Krusen to expand the field of physical medicine when he was appointed chair of the new Section of Physical Therapy at the Mayo Clinic. The roots of Physical Medicine and Rehabilitation (PM&R) at the Mayo Clinic started in 1911, 25 years before Krusen arrived, when the new head of the Section on Orthopedic Surgery, Melvin S. Henderson, MD, established physiotherapy services for postoperative orthopedic patients.

By 1918, the Section of Physiotherapy was formed within orthopedics. Members of the Social Services Department in 1921 established occupation therapy services due to the need for avocational, vocational, and community reintegration interventions for patients. Another physiotherapy service was developed, from 1923-1924, by Arthur Desjardins, MD, within the Section of Radiology. This service focused on the treatment and training on modalities for tissue healing using high-frequency diathermy, hydrotherapy, and electrotherapy. As could be predicted, tension developed between the 2 physiotherapy groups, and misunderstandings brewed for nearly a decade. Over time, neither of the departments had the time or interest in supervising physical medicine practices. The stage was set for recruiting a physician leader in this developing area of medicine centered on physical medicine. With all parties agreeing to an independent section, Krusen arrived in 1935, beginning a 28-year career at the Mayo Clinic, where he would further develop the field of PM&R through the major accomplishments of his career.

The integrated group practice model at Mayo Clinic proved to be an ideal environment for Krusen to develop the specialty of physical medicine. Within his first seven years at the Mayo Clinic, he successfully integrated the various components of physiotherapy practice under one section. The department staff grew from a mere 18 to 108 people, with an increase of 83% in the patient population that received treatment. Krusen also established Mayo Clinic's School of Physical Therapy in 1938, with 54 students in each class, a program that has trained thousands of physical therapists over the past 75 years.

Krusen was skillful at using educational formats to bring people together for collaboration. His initial 5 rotating residents from other specialties quickly evolved into the nation's first 3-year resident training program in physical medicine, established in 1936. Earl Elkins, MD), and Robert Bennett, MD [9], 2 other pioneers in the field of PM&R, were Krusen's first Mayo physical medicine residency graduates. The resident training program has since graduated hundreds of physiatrists and fellows.

Statements in Krusen's diary suggest that it is likely the unique practice environment at the Mayo Clinic that facilitated his efforts to expand the field in a number of ways. It fostered his efforts to centralize all therapy efforts under one physician leader, and he found support to grow the practice from other established departments, including orthopedic surgery, radiology, and internal medicine. Krusen's intellectual, organizational, and interpersonal skills found their perfect expression at the Mayo Clinic, where his efforts resulted in physical medicine gaining needed visibility within an internationally known medical institution. “Rehabilitation is to be a key word in medicine,” predicted William Mayo in 1925.

Years later, his nephew, Charles Mayo commented, “My late uncle made this prediction...and ten years later he brought to the Mayo Clinic in Rochester, Minnesota, the physician who, perhaps more than any other individual, has helped make this prediction come true”.

In 1938, Krusen included the following comments in his personal journal on his experience at the Mayo Clinic: “As in past years, the relationship to other departments has been most satisfactory from our standpoint. As with every new field of medical endeavor, there is a certain amount of passive resistance to its development; however, this is less apparent in the Mayo Clinic than in any other institution with which I have been connected. The feeling of cordial cooperation which exists throughout the institution is a never-ending source of pleasure” (internal document, Mayo Clinic, Rochester, MN).

== Research and education ==
Krusen realized that the growth of the field of physical medicine required an ongoing commitment to research, and he was an early proponent of outcome studies and evidence-based practice. His scholarly output was abundant, with publication of more than 400 scientific articles and many textbooks throughout his career. Krusen is best known for his work on physical modalities, with more than 100 articles in that topical area. In the 1930s, the modality articles focused on fever therapy, shortwave diathermy, heat lamps, colonic irrigation, and radiotherapy.

In the 1940s, he continued publishing on shortwave diathermy and fever therapy but added articles on ultraviolet, infrared, and atomic energy. In the 1950s, Krusen published multiple ultrasound plus microwave and electrical stimulation articles. Although modalities were his main focus, Krusen also published articles in the 1930s on industrial medicine, followed in the 1950s with articles on disabled workers and industrial health. During World War II and shortly after, Krusen published several articles on the need for rehabilitation training within the United States defense programs. Later in his career, he stressed the important role that PM&R should play in the hospital and outpatient settings, and offered commentary on the future of PM&R within the broader field of medicine.

Although Krusen's successes in administration, education, and research are impressive enough, what is most recognized about his contributions nationally and internationally is the key role he played in establishing the specialty of PM&R in the American Board of Medical Specialties. He joined John Stanley Coulter and others to establish the American Congress of Physical Therapy. As its president in 1938, he was involved in the effort to establish an Academy of Physical Therapy Physicians, the organization that became the American Academy of Physical Medicine and Rehabilitation in 1955.

Krusen worked for nearly two decades to have PM&R recognized as a medical specialty. His efforts were supported by a strategic alliance with the wealthy and influential philanthropist M. Bernard Baruch and the formation of the Baruch Committee, which resulted in large grants to academic centers to create PM&R research and training programs throughout the country. Krusen's vision to establish the specialty of physical medicine was eventually codified by the American Board of Medical Specialties in 1947.

Krusen was elected the first chairman of the American Board of Physical Medicine, although the first board certificate was awarded to John S. Coulter in recognition of his pioneering role in the field; Krusen received certificate number two. Contemporary accounts note that Krusen viewed the establishment of the Board as the culmination of many years of effort to develop physical medicine as a recognized medical specialty.

In 1948, Howard Rusk, MD, another widely acknowledged pioneer in the field of PM&R, pushed to introduce the word “rehabilitation” to the specialty to better emphasize its holistic aspect of care for a broad range of diagnoses. This view was facilitated by government interest in the rehabilitation of World War II veterans, for whom trained physicians were in short supply. Krusen was in agreement with Rusk when many early physiatrists were worried that “rehabilitation medicine” would quickly absorb the “physical medicine” component. Krusen expressed his support to fuse physical medicine with medical rehabilitation in an editorial in the Archives of Physical Medicine: “It is obvious that the close relationships between physical medicine and rehabilitation must be recognized. While neither special field can or should absorb the other, the many interconnections should be indicated. There are phases of physical medicine (as in the definitive treatment of acute diseases by physical agents) which cannot be called rehabilitation. Similarly there are phases of rehabilitation (as in the psychosocial readjustment of disabled persons) which cannot be called physical medicine. Yet, for the most part, physical medicine and medical rehabilitation are closely interdigitated and it is apparent that it would be illogical for either physical medicine or medical rehabilitation to go its separate way”. After extensive discussions, the new specialty board changed its name from the American Board of Physical Medicine to the American Board of Physical Medicine and Rehabilitation by 1950.

The term “physiatrist” is credited to Krusen and became the name given to physicians who specialized in physical medicine in the early 1940s. Periodic discussions continue both about the name of the specialty and the name conferred to its practitioners, including its pronunciation.

In the 1950s, Krusen continuing his work at the Mayo Clinic but increasingly devoting his time to defending the new specialty from groups within organized medicine intent on limiting the scope of practice of the field, particularly with respect to the concept of rehabilitation. His efforts culminated in a compromise at an AMA arbitration committee meeting in 1955, which resulted in retention of the word “rehabilitation” for the certifying board, while dropping the term only within the organizational structure of the AMA councils. In addition to his work in defense of the specialty through the 1950s, Krusen continued his focus on research and education now on a national scale. In 1959, he was tasked with further developing research in PM&R, working through the Office of Vocational Rehabilitation in Washington, DC, under the direction of Mary Switzer, the administrator who shaped the 1954 Vocational Rehabilitation Act, legislation that greatly expanded services for people with disabilities. Krusen's efforts in this role resulted in support for the establishment of PM&R research and training centers nationally.

In 1958, Krusen stepped down as the Mayo Clinic's PM&R department chair. He was asked to assume the role of medical director at the Sister Kenny Foundation in Minneapolis, Minnesota, when the foundation experienced financial difficulties. From 1959 to 1963, he once again used his skills of diplomacy and leadership to help save the Foundation from insolvency, secure the future of its training programs, and restore the institution's image. On completion of this mission, he retired his position at the Mayo Clinic and returned to Temple University in Philadelphia. There, he worked to bring the academic PM&R department that he had founded at Temple University in 1929 to prominence once again. In 1968, he set his sights on Boston, moving there to establish his third academic PM&R department, Tufts–New England Medical Center.

== Honors and death ==
In 1962, he received an honorary doctorate from the Faculty of Medicine at Justus Liebig University in Giessen (Germany).

The year prior to his death, the American Academy of Physical Medicine and Rehabilitation established The Frank H. Krusen, MD Lifetime Achievement Award to honor him. Krusen, the Academy's fourth president, was the first recipient of the award that now bears his name. The Krusen Award is the American Academy of Physical Medicine and Rehabilitation's highest honor, and recipients of the gold medallion are selected on the basis of their outstanding and unique contributions to the specialty in the areas of patient care, research, education, and administration.

Krusen fully retired in 1969, and moved to Cape Cod, Massachusetts, where he died in 1973 at the age of 75 years.

== Bibliography ==
- Handbook of Physical Medicine and Rehabilitation. W. B. Saunders. 1971. ISBN 9780721655710. "paul m. ellwood jr." (with Frederic J. Kottke and Paul M. Ellwood Jr.)
