= Kachhwa =

Town in Uttar Pradesh, India

- Town
- Location in Uttar Pradesh, India
- Coordinates: 25.207°N 82.716°E
- Country: India
- State: Uttar Pradesh
- District: Mirzapur
- Elevation: 84 m (276 ft)

Population (2011)
  - Total: 19,798

Language
  - Official: Hindi
  - Additional official: Urdu
- Time zone: UTC+5:30 (IST)

Kachhwa is a town and a nagar panchayat in Mirzapur district in the Indian state of Uttar Pradesh.

== Geography ==
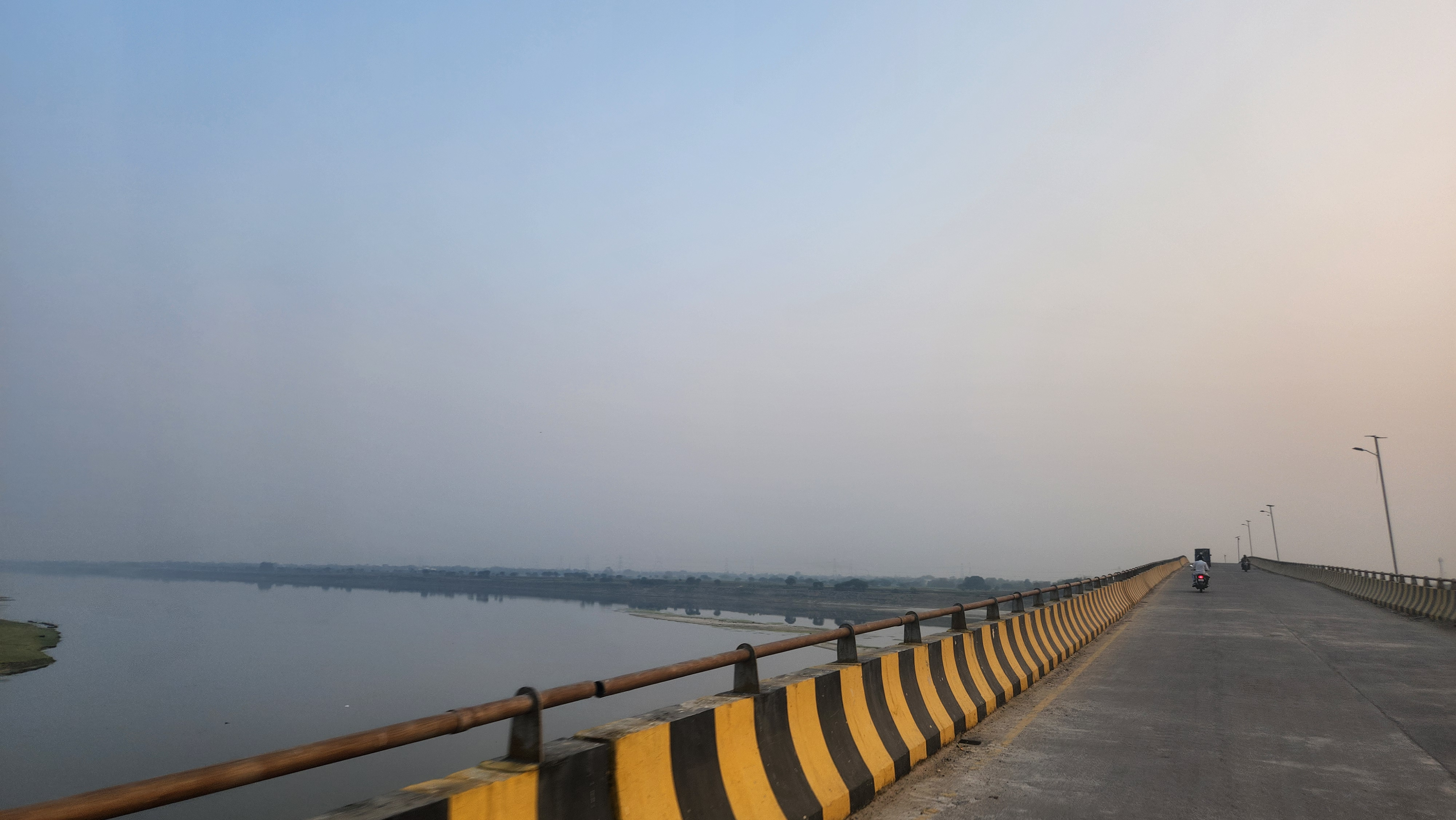
Batauli Ganga bridge across Ganges connects Kachhwa to Mirzapur

Kachhwa is located at 25.22°N 82.72°E. It has an average elevation of 84 metres (275 feet). It is around 30 km. away from Varanasi Cantt.

== Demographics ==
As of 2011 Indian Census, Kachhwa had a total population of 15,958, of which 8,363 were males and 7,595 were females. Population within the age group of 0 to 6 years was 2,240. The total number of literates in Kachhwa was 10,846, which constituted 68.0% of the population with male literacy of 76.5% and female literacy of 58.6%. The effective literacy rate of 7+ population of Kachhwa was 79.1%, of which male literacy rate was 88.8% and female literacy rate was 68.3%. The Scheduled Castes and Scheduled Tribes population was 2,369 and 39 respectively. Kachhwa had 2249 households in 2011.

== Healthcare ==
Kachhwa Christian Hospital provides the healthcare facilities for the nearby villages and rural population.
