= Lehman Formula =

Compensation formula in banking

The Lehman Formula, also known as the Lehman Scale, is a formula to define the compensation a bank or finder should receive when arranging for and handling a large underwriting or stock brokerage transfer transaction for a client. The formula usually applies to the entire value of the stock.

== Formula ==
The Lehman formula was originally used by investment banks and individual or corporate "finders" for the raising of capital for a business, either in public offerings or private placements, payable by the vendor(s) of the business once the funds have cleared. It usually deals with amounts greater than one million dollars. Below this mark, brokerage services and investment banks usually offer a set of tiered fees, or set-rate trading prices (such as $9.95 per trade).

The original version (called the Lehman Scale) was as follows:

- 5% of the first $1 million raised from investors
- 4% of the second $1 million raised from investors
- 3% of the third $1 million raised from investors
- 2% of the fourth $1 million raised from investors
- 1% of everything above $4 million raised from investors.

The Lehman Scale was widely used in the 1970s, 1980s and 1990s but is no longer the standard that it used to be due to inflation ($100 in 1970 is $829 in 2025 dollars). To account for this, some banks developed variants in the 1990s that critics saw as overly greedy - for example, switching to $10 million increments (i.e., 5% of the first $10 million, plus 4% of the next $10 million, etc.). Today, the original formula remains in use in limited situations with so-called "finders" - individuals (or firms), who introduce relationships but otherwise do not have any execution, distribution, legal, analytic, or administrative role in the execution of a deal.

== History ==
The formula was first developed in the early 1970s by Lehman Brothers, for underwriting and capital raising services. Before this, the charge would vary wildly from institution to institution. In some cases, the charges exceeded 15%. Lehman Brothers created a formula to apply to the dollars in terms of total capital of a transaction, rather than a larger share of equity dollars.

== Usage ==
The Lehman Formula was used when a large stock investment transaction is made with an investment bank or institutional broker and for private asset transactions. It also began to be used for finders who would arrange for the parties to an acquisition of private placement. It is generally used in two different ways, either counting each million dollars of value separately, or all at one time.

=== By million dollar amount method (MDA) ===
The MDA method is the original formula, and applies each percentage to its own bracket. For example, if an investor wished to sell $3 million worth of stock, he would pay the broker he used a fee of 5%, or $50,000, on the first million dollars of transaction value, 4% (40,000) of the second million, and 3% (30,000)of the third million, for a total fee of $120,000. On an investment of $50 million, the total fee would be $600,000.

The MDA tends to generate the highest fees, and is usually used when the transaction is under 4 million, to generate the most money.

=== By total value amount (TVA) ===
The TVA basically applies the percentage fee that fits the highest dollar value. For example, if an investor wished to sell $3 million worth of stock, he would pay the broker he used a fee of 3% of three million dollars, or $90,000. On an investment of $50 million, the total fee would be 1% of 50 million, or 500,000.

=== By pertinent value amount (PVA) ===
The PVA works exactly like the TVA until the transaction exceeds 4 million. It then charges 2% of the first four million, and 1% of everything beyond that.

== Variants due to inflation ==
One problem with the Lehman Formula is inflation. A five million dollar deal was more significant when the formula was designed in the 1960s, but today it is considered small by most large banks. However, rather than indexing the formula for inflation, most investment services ended up making adjustments to the formula to provide fee protection for the first few million dollars of transaction value.

=== Double Lehman ===
An occasional variant used in the 1990s was the Double Lehman formula, which doubled the percentages but skipped odd numbers.

- 10% of the first $1 million, plus
- 8% of the second $1 million, plus
- 6% of the third $1 million, plus
- 4% of the fourth $1 million, plus
- 2% of everything above $4 million.

This resulted in an approximately 2x adjustment to the original formula, vs 6x for inflation.

=== Double Percentage Lehman ("Modern Lehman") ===
A more common variant used by mid-market M&A specialists and business brokers is the Double Percentage Lehman ("Modern Lehman"). Under this variation - not to be confused with the Double Lehman - both the percentages and the scale were adjusted, instead of the percentages only. In addition, the percentage is held constant at 3% above $8 million:

- 10% of the first $1 million, plus
- 9% of the second $1 million, plus
- 8% of the third $1 million, plus
- 7% of the fourth $1 million, plus
- 6% of the fifth $1 million, plus
- 5% of the sixth $1 million, plus
- 4% of the seventh $1 million, plus
- 3% of the eighth $1 million and everything above.

This resulted in an approximately 3x adjustment to the original formula, vs 6x for inflation.

=== Additional Variations ===
Despite Modern Lehman being the most common form in use, this does not mean that rates are not still negotiated on a case by case. Some banks seek higher rates (such as Triple Lehman), and some companies push for lower rates, particularly for $100 million and higher transactions.

In addition, some companies increasingly run transactions in-house. The most notable example was the Google IPO, where Google performed the analytic, execution and structuring requirements, used a Dutch Auction for pricing, and banks for their distribution network.

For larger transactions in particular, it is common for the bulk of the fee payments to be in the form of retainers and ongoing fees. Typically, underwriters also get warrants on the company stock with a public offering and try to get the company that is raising the capital to pay the underwriter's legal fees which are usually significant.

== See also ==
- Lehman Fee Calculator
