= Physical medicine and rehabilitation =

Branch of medicine

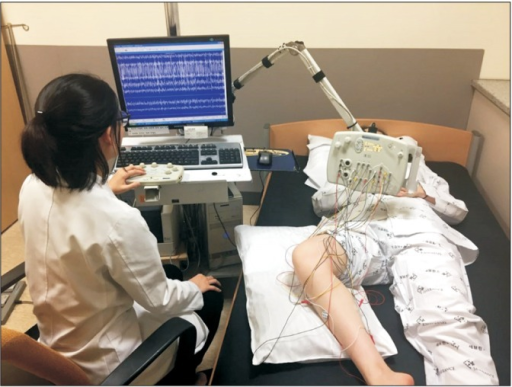
- Rehabilitation physician conducting a 10-channel dynamic polyelectromyography during a patient's dystonic event

Occupation
- Names: Physician
- Synonyms: Physiatry, rehabilitation medicine, PM&R
- Pronunciation: /fɪˈzaɪ.ətri/
- Activity sectors: Medicine

Description
- Education required: Doctor of Medicine (MD); Doctor of Osteopathic Medicine (DO); Bachelor of Medicine, Bachelor of Surgery (MBBS/MBChB)

Physical medicine and rehabilitation (PM&R), also known as physiatry, and outside the United States as physical and rehabilitation medicine (PRM), is a branch of medicine that aims to enhance and restore functional ability and quality of life to people with physical impairments or disabilities. Officially established in the United States in the mid-1900s, PM&R has played a major role in patient recovery following several major epidemics and both world wars. Common medical conditions treated by PM&R physicians include central nervous system fatigue, spinal cord injury, brain injury, musculoskeletal injury, stroke, pain, and spasticity from muscle, ligament, or nerve damage. PM&R physicians lead rehabilitation teams in inpatient and outpatient settings and are trained in medication management, electrodiagnosis, and targeted injections. A physician having completed training in this field may be referred to as a physiatrist.

== Scope of the field ==
Physical medicine and rehabilitation encompasses a variety of settings and patient populations. Physiatrists can also oversee patient care in subacute settings (Inpatient rehabilitation, LTAC, SNF). A major goal of Physiatry is to optimize function. Thus, the scope of the field is broad in terms of patient populations and conditions that are managed.

In hospital settings, physiatrists commonly treat patients who have had a spinal cord injury, stroke, traumatic brain injury, amputation, or other debilitating condition requiring acute rehabilitation care. In treating these patients, physiatrists lead a team of physical, occupational, and speech therapists, as well as nurses, psychologists, and social workers who work in tandem to facilitate patient care.

In the outpatient setting, physiatrists can see to the long-term care of patients with disabling conditions and management of the sequelae associated with those conditions. For example, a physiatrist could manage the bowel and bladder regimen for a SCI patient. In addition, patients can be evaluated and treated for muscle and joint injuries, pain syndromes, non-healing wounds, and other disabling conditions.

Physiatrists are trained to perform injections into joints or muscle as a pain treatment option. Physiatrists are also trained in ultrasound, nerve conduction studies, and electromyography.

Physical medicine in practice:

Physiatrists aim to treat a wide array of diseases and disorders, and the field is continually growing. Problems with the musculoskeletal system and the central nervous system (brain and spinal cord) encompass the types of ailments patients will have. Overall the treatment can be described as focusing on restoring body structure and function. However there are still goals to help the patient socially and psychologically, as these injuries or ailments often take a toll on the person. Commonly treated disorders include knee or hip pain, back pain, problems walking, nervous system disorders, weakness, or chronic pain in general. Other problems, such as cardiopulmonary conditions, bladder/bowel issues, arthritis, and pneumonia are all disorders the physiatrist aims to treat.

== History ==
During the first half of the 20th century, two unofficial specialties, physical medicine and rehabilitation medicine, developed separately, but in practice both treated similar patient populations consisting of those with disabling injuries. Frank H. Krusen was a pioneer of physical medicine, which emphasized the use of physical agents, such as hydrotherapy and hyperbaric oxygen. His work began at Temple University and was continued at Mayo Clinic where he coined the term 'physiatry' in 1938. Rehabilitation medicine gained prominence during both World Wars in the treatment of injured soldiers and laborers. Howard A. Rusk, an internal medicine physician from Missouri, became a pioneer of rehabilitation medicine after being appointed to rehabilitate airmen during World War II. In 1944, the Baruch Committee, commissioned by philanthropist Bernard Baruch, defined the specialty as a combination of the two fields and laid the framework for its acceptance as an official medical specialty. The committee also distributed funds to establish training and research programs across the nation. The specialty that came to be known as physical medicine and rehabilitation in the United States was officially established in 1947, when an independent Board of Physical Medicine was established under the authority of the American Board of Medical Specialties. In 1949, at the insistence of Rusk and others, the specialty incorporated rehabilitation medicine and changed its name to Physical Medicine and Rehabilitation.

PM&R has played an important role in several epidemics, including management of the long-term complications of the poliovirus. Prior to its official creation as a specialty in the United States, many modern PM&R concepts were developed following President Franklin D. Roosevelt's time at Warm Springs Resort, a hot springs spa in Georgia. He attended the facility in 1924 to assist in his recovery from paralysis secondary to the poliovirus. Due to improvements in his own condition, Roosevelt later purchased the resort in 1926 and transformed it into a medical rehabilitation center. He continued to fundraise money for the facility throughout his presidential years in the 1930s. The improvements to the facility allowed for budding physiatrists, including Dr. Robert L Bennett, to research and enhance the field of PM&R. Many of the techniques that Bennett developed at Warm Springs continue to be utilized by physiatrists today, including the refinement of manual muscle testing and the creation of several prosthetic devices.

== Treatment methods ==
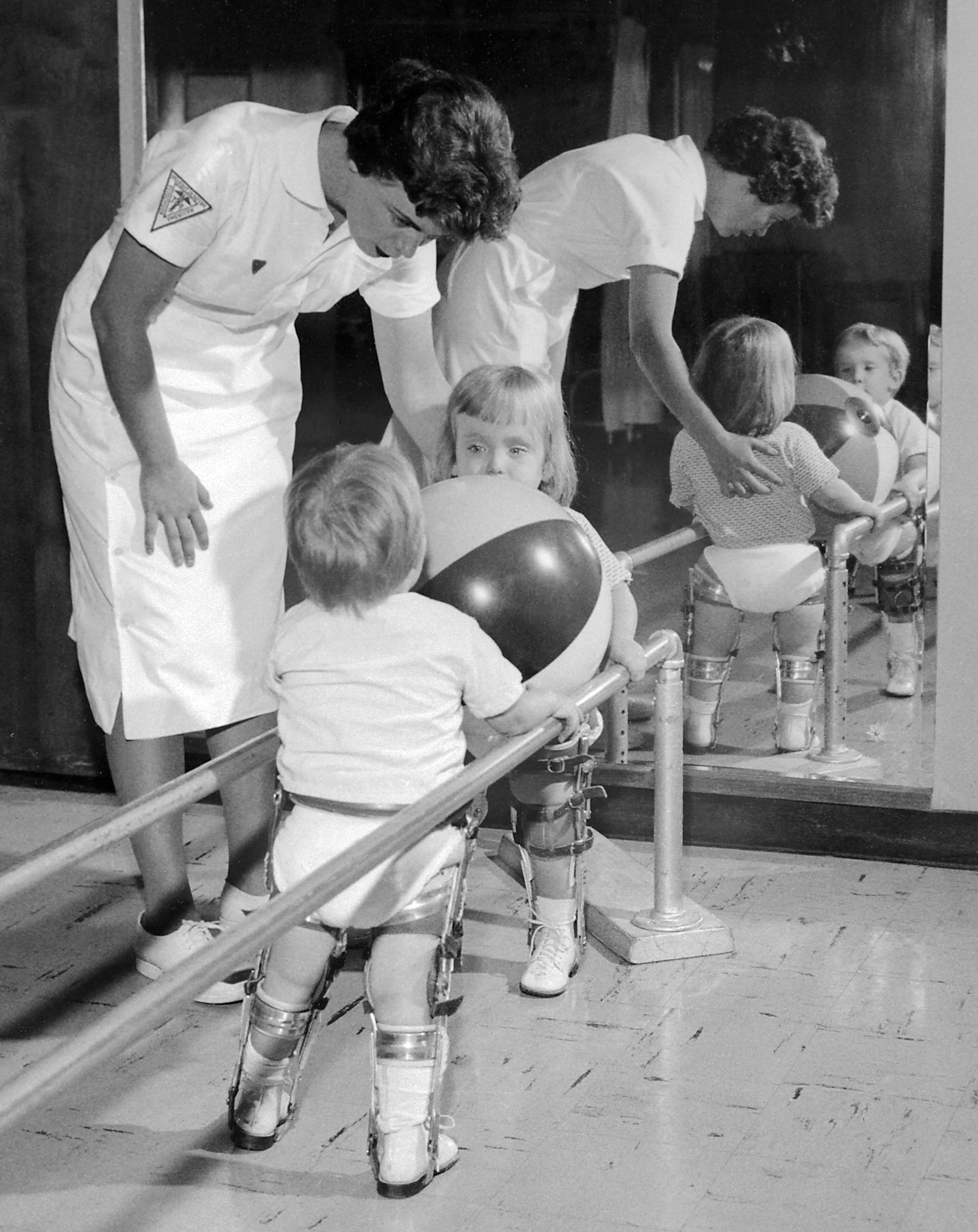
Pediatric patients participating in physical therapy following poliovirus diagnosis

The major goal of physical medicine and rehabilitation treatment is to help a person reach optimal functionality within the limitations placed upon them by a disabling impairment or disease process for which there is no known cure. The emphasis is not on the full restoration to the premorbid level of function, but rather the optimization of the quality of life for those not able to achieve full restoration. A team approach to chronic conditions is emphasized to coordinate care of patients. Comprehensive rehabilitation is more easily facilitated with a multi-disciplinary approach and can more effectively carried out by a range of professionals.

Physiatrists commonly treat patients afflicted with a disability or handicap. Such ailments may be due to old age, chronic illnesses, trauma, accidents, etc. Sometimes patients are referred to physiatrists because they have generalized weakness due to bed rest as a result of another disease. Spinal cord injuries, traumatic brain injuries, certain genetic diseases are other common cases that a physiatrist sees.

In rehabilitation, goal setting is often used by the clinical care team to provide the team and the person undergoing rehabilitation for an acquired disability a direction to work towards. Very low quality evidence indicates that goal setting may lead to a higher quality of life for the person with the disability, and it not clear if goal setting used in this context reduces or increases re-hospitalization or death.

Not only must a physiatrist have medical knowledge regarding a patient's condition, but they also need to have practical knowledge regarding it as well. This involves issues such as: what type of wheelchair best suits the patient, what type of prosthetic would fit best, will the patient's current house layout accommodate their handicap well, and other every day complications that their patients might have.

Interestingly there is a role for positive psychologists to play in physical medicine and rehabilitation. Oftentimes, following a medically traumatic event, an individual's quality of life is often reduced, such as with stroke, traumatic brain injuries, multiple sclerosis, etc. Resilience to these events might be necessary for a patient to return to baseline. Combining positive psychology with rehabilitation medicine can improve well-being for the patient. A study conducted involving those diagnosed with acquired brain injuries had better perceptions of their functioning and abilities after rehabilitation treatment than those without. Coping skills can be taught as well as resources and other strategies can be combined with rehabilitation medicine for the betterment of the patient's quality of life.

Additionally psychology can be integrated into physical medicine and rehabilitation is through the treatment of traumatic brain injuries. The psychological impacts of traumatic brain injuries often go unnoticed and are neglected in treatment. A multi-disciplinary team of experts, including psychologists are often more efficient for these types of injuries, including teams of psychologists, neuropsychologists, physical medicine experts, speech language pathologists, and more. Certain consequences of a traumatic brain injury may result such as aggression, memory deficits, executive functioning problems, and other cognitive and emotional setbacks.

Certain technologies have been implemented into the field, such as electromyography (EMG). Extensive training with these technologies is required for the physiatrist. Nerve conduction studies are also commonly utilized. Being able to look at the electrical activity of the patient's body and muscular system provides deeper insight into where the pain is and what might be causing it. This information is critical for diagnostics, especially in cases with weakness or paralysis. Scanning with ultrasounds is also common.

== Professional development ==
In the United States, residency training for physical medicine and rehabilitation is four years (PGY1-4) long, including an intern year of general medical training. There are 112 ACGME accredited PM&R residency training programs in the United States. In addition, there are four ACGME accredited pediatric PM&R residency training programs.

Specifics of training differs from program to program but all residents must obtain the same fundamental skills. Residents are trained in the inpatient setting to take care of multiple types of rehabilitation including: spinal cord injury, traumatic brain injury, stroke, orthopedic injuries, cancer, cerebral palsy, burn, pediatric rehab, and other disabling injuries. The residents are also trained in the outpatient setting to know how to take care of the chronic conditions patients have following their inpatient stay. During training, residents are instructed on how to properly perform several diagnostic procedures which include electromyography, nerve conduction studies and also procedures such as joint injections and trigger point injections.

=== Subspecialties ===
At the present moment, there are six subspecialties in the field of physical medicine and rehabilitation. These subspecialties include brain injury medicine, neuromuscular medicine, spinal cord injury medicine, sports medicine, pain medicine, and pediatric rehabilitation medicine. Additionally there are fellowships for other areas in the field, such as cancer rehabilitation, interventional spine and musculoskeletal medicine, multiple sclerosis research, neuromuscular medicine, non-interventional spine and musculoskeletal medicine, Parkinson's disease and movement disorders, spasticity management, and wound medicine. Overall, four years of physical medicine and rehabilitation residency is required after medical school to focus on physiatry.

== See also ==
- American Osteopathic Board of Physical Medicine and Rehabilitation
- American Academy of Physical Medicine and Rehabilitation
