= Lehmann (lunar crater) =

Lunar surface depression

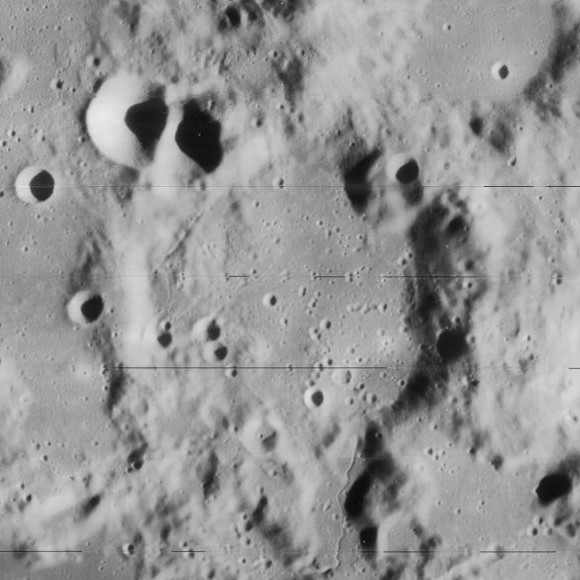
- Lunar Orbiter 4 image
- Coordinates: 40.0°S 56.0°W
- Diameter: 53 km
- Depth: 0.8 km
- Colongitude: 56° at sunrise
- Eponym: Jacob H. W. Lehmann

Lehmann is a lunar impact crater attached to the northern rim of the much larger formation called Schickard, a walled plain. To the northwest is the crater Lacroix.

Lehmann is heavily worn with an irregular rim. A small double-crater overlays a portion of the northwest rim. The interior floor is nearly flat with groupings of tiny craterlets near the south and west edges. There is a gap in the southern rim which connects the floor to Schickard. A sinuous rille runs along the length of this valley.
