= Lehman (surname) =

Lehman is a surname. The Lehman family was prominent in finance in the United States. Notable people with the surname include:

- Ari Lehman (born 1965), American actor
- Albert Lehman, American lacrosse player
- Bruce Lehman (born 1945), American patent lawyer
- David Lehman (born 1948), American poetry editor
- Emery Lehman (born 1996), American speed skater
- Emanuel Lehman (1827–1907), one of the three founding brothers of the investment bank Lehman Brothers
- Emma Augusta Lehman (1841–1922), American teacher, poet, naturalist and botanical collector
- Ernest Lehman (1915–2005), American screenwriter
- F. K. Lehman (1924–2016), American anthropologist
- Harry Lehman (1935-2022), American lawyer and politician
- Henry Lehman (1822–1855), one of the three founding brothers of the investment bank Lehman Brothers
- Herbert Henry Lehman, American politician from New York
- Hughie Lehman (1885–1961), Canadian ice hockey player
- Irving Lehman (1876–1945), American lawyer and judge from New York
- Jeffrey S. Lehman (born 1956), American president of Cornell University
- Jean-Pierre Lehman (1914-1981), French paleontologist
- John F. Lehman, American banker
- Ken Lehman (1928–2010), American baseball player and coach
- Kristin Lehman (born 1970), Canadian actress
- Lillian Lehman, American actress
- Manny Lehman, professor
- Manny Lehman, DJ and producer
- Matt Lehman, American politician from Indiana
- Mayer Lehman (1830–1897), one of the three founding brothers of the investment bank Lehman Brothers
- Michael A. Lehman (1943-2017), American politician
- Orin Lehman (1920–2008), American politician
- Philip Lehman (1861–1947), American banker
- Phillip Lehman (born 1965), Franco-American graffiti artist known as Bando
- Richard Lehman (CIA officer) (1923–2007), American CIA officer
- Robert Lehman (1891–1969), American banker, son of Philip
- Robin Lehman, American cinematographer, son of Robert
- Siegfried Lehman (1892–1958), German-born Israeli educator
- Teddy Lehman (born 1981), American football player
- Tom Lehman (born 1959), American golfer
- Val Lehman (born 1943), Australian actress
- William Lehman (Florida politician) (1913–2005), American politician

== See also ==
- Lehmann
