= Leaman =

Leaman may refer to:

- Leaman (surname)
- Leaman, Alberta, also known as Yellowhead County, Alberta, a municipal district in west central Alberta, Canada
- Leaman Place, Pennsylvania, a named place in Lancaster County, Pennsylvania, United States

== See also ==
- Aleman (disambiguation)
- Alleman (disambiguation)
- Allemann
- Laaman
- Lahman
- Lahmann
- Laiman
- Lamane
- Lamian
- Lanman (disambiguation)
- Laomian (disambiguation)
- Lawman (disambiguation)
- Layman
- Laḥman
- Lee Man
- Leeman (disambiguation)
- Lehman (disambiguation)
- Lehmann
- Lei Man
- Lemann
- Lineman (disambiguation)
