= Charles Wilkins Webber =

American journalist and explorer

- Born: May 29, 1819; Russellville, Kentucky
- Died: April 11, 1856 (aged 36); Rivas, Nicaragua
- Occupations: journalist, explorer
- Known for: writer for literary periodicals, author of books
- Father: Augustine Webber

Charles Wilkins Webber (May 29, 1819 – April 11, 1856) was an American journalist and explorer.

== Biography ==
Webber was born at Russellville, Kentucky. He was the son of Augustine Webber, a well-known medical doctor in Kentucky. His mother, who was the daughter of Gen. John Tannehill, passed on to him a fondness for outdoor life. In 1838, Webber went to Texas, then struggling for independence; was for several years connected with the famous Texas Rangers, seeing much of wild and adventurous life on the frontier; returned to Kentucky and studied medicine; afterward entered Princeton Theological Seminary with a view to the Presbyterian ministry, but abandoned that purpose, and settled in New York as a writer for literary periodicals, especially The New World, The Democratic Review, and The Sunday Despatch; was associate editor and joint proprietor of The Whig Review; planned, with the two sons of his friend John James Audubon the naturalist, a monthly magazine of mammoth size, to be illustrated with copper-plate colored engravings by Audubon, but published only the first number; was engaged in an unsuccessful attempt to lead an exploring and mining expedition to the region of the Colorado and Gila rivers in 1849. A principal reason for the failure of the expedition to the west was the seizure of the horses by Comanche Indians.

The difficulty in crossing the western deserts led to his efforts to form a camel company, for which he obtained a charter from the New York legislature in 1854, but the project never came to fruition. In 1855, he went to Central America, where he joined the filibuster William Walker in Nicaragua, to fight in the Filibuster War, and was killed in the Second Battle of Rivas.

== Works ==
In addition to his contributions to periodicals, he authored Old Hicks the Guide, or Adventures in the Comanche Country in Search of a Gold-Mine (New York, 1848); The Gold-Mines of the Gila (1849); The Hunter Naturalist, a Romance of Sporting (Philadelphia, 1851), with 40 engravings from original drawings by Mrs. Webber; Wild Scenes and Song-Birds (New York, 1854), with 20 colored illustrations from drawings by Mrs. Webber; Tales of the Southern Border (part i, 1852; complete, 1853); Spiritual Vampirism (1853); Jack Long; or The Shot in the Eye (a Gothic Western highly praised by Edgar Allan Poe); Adventures with the Texan Rifle Rangers (London, 1853); History of Mystery (Philadelphia, 1855); and other works.

In April 1850, Webber published a letter in the New York Daily Herald that discussed his mental sufferings, depression and nervous episodes he had been experiencing. Ironically, this was published on the same page as a column discussing some of Glanton's latest activities.

== Possible identification as Judge Holden ==
Webber is arguably the most popular historical figure to be identified with the "Judge Holden" whom Samuel Chamberlain talks about in his book My Confession: The Recollections of a Rogue, a person who inspired the character of the same name in Cormac McCarthy's famous novel Blood Meridian. Webber was active in the same region that Chamberlain described during the same time period. Holden was also a polymath, skilled in the very same areas as Webber, such as biology and theology. Furthermore, Webber's presence in Nicaragua with William Walker and the filibusters made him a close colleague of Charlie Brown, a known member of Glanton's scalping party. Others have speculated on John Allen Veatch as another possible historical identification for Judge Holden.
