= Leemans =

Leemans is a Dutch occupational surname derived from leenman, a feudal tenant or vassal. It is particularly common in Flanders. People with this surname include:

- Anthonie Leemans (1631–1673), Dutch still life painter, brother of Johannes
- Clint Leemans (born 1995), Dutch footballer
- Conradus Leemans (1809–1893), Dutch Egyptologist and museum director
- Egide François Leemans (1839–1883), Belgian painter, draughtsman and engraver
- Fernand Leemans (1925–2004), Belgian figure skater
- Hec Leemans (1950), Belgian comics artist
- Jo Leemans (born 1927), Belgian singer
- Johannes Leemans (1633–1688), Dutch still life painter and wine dealer, brother of Anthonie
- Ken Leemans (born 1983), Belgian footballer
- Kimberly Leemans, a U.S. model
- Marc Leemans (1961), Belgian trade unionist
- Pieter Leemans (1897–1980), Belgian classical musician and composer
- Tuffy Leemans (1912–1979), American football player
- Victor Leemans (1901–1971), Belgian (Flemish) sociologist and politician
- Ward Leemans (1926–1998), Belgian sociologist and politician
- Wilhelmus François Leemans (1841–1929), Dutch civil engineer and statesman
- Wilhelmus François Leemans (1912–1991), Dutch lawyer and assyriologist

== See also ==
- Leeman (disambiguation)
