= Judge (disambiguation) =

A judge is an official who presides over a court.

Judge or Judges may also refer to:

== Roles ==
- Judge, an alternative name for an adjudicator in a competition in theatre, music, sport, etc.
- Judge, an alternative name/aviator call sign for a member of the Judge Advocate General's Corps, U.S. Navy
- Judge, an alternative name for a sports linesman, referee or umpire
- County judge, an executive officer role in certain counties
- County judge/executive, an executive officer in Kentucky counties
- Hebrew Bible judges, an office of authority in the early history of Israel

== Places ==
- Judge, Minnesota, a community in the United States
- Judge, Missouri, a community in the United States
- The Judge (British Columbia), a mountain in the Columbia Mountains of Canada

== People ==
- Judge (surname)
- Judge Jules, professional name of British DJ and record producer Julius O'Riordan
- Judge Reinhold, American actor best known for his work in films during the 1980s

== Arts, entertainment, and media ==
=== Fictional characters ===
- Judge (Buffyverse), a demon character in the television series Buffy The Vampire Slayer
- Judge (comics), several characters from DC Comics
- Archadian Judges, from the game Final Fantasy XII
- Judge Holden, from Cormac McCarthy's novel Blood Meridian

=== Films ===
- The Judge (1960 film), a Swedish drama
- The Judge (1984 film), a French crime drama
- The Judge (2014 film), an American drama film
- The Judge, a 2017 documentary about Kholoud Faqih

=== Other arts, entertainment, and media ===
- Judge (band), a hardcore punk band from New York City
- Judge (magazine), a late 19th-century United States publication
- Judge (manga), a 1989 manga series
- Judge (novel), a 2008 novel by Karen Traviss
- The Judge (TV series), an American syndicated television drama that ran from 1986 to 1992 starring Bob Shield as Judge Robert J. Franklin
- Judge (2000 AD), a fictional office in the Judge Dredd comic strip
- Jydge, a 2017 video game
- Judge, a 1980 Game & Watch game

== Other uses ==
- Book of Judges, seventh book of the Hebrew Bible and the Christian Old Testament
- Brandeis Judges, the varsity athletics teams at Brandeis University
- Judge (Magic: the Gathering), a tournament official in the collectible card game
- Pontiac GTO Judge, a 1970s American automobile
- Taurus Judge, a revolver that fires .45 Colt and .410 bore ammunition

== See also ==
- The Judge (disambiguation)
