= John Veatch =

American settler and scientist (1808–1870)

John Allen Veatch (March 5, 1808 – April 24, 1870) was an American surgeon, surveyor, and scientist, was known for his discovery of large deposits of borax at Tuscan Springs, California, on January 8, 1856.

== Biography ==
Veatch was born on March 5, 1808. In 1834, he moved with his family to Texas, where he surveyed for the Mexican government. He received two land grants in 1835, one located in what would become Beaumont, Texas, and another near the future Sour Lake, Texas. After the Texas Revolution, where he served as a surgeon, Veatch moved to California, where he discovered borax at Tuscan Springs in Lake County, California, on January 8, 1856.

Veatch eventually ended up in Oregon, where he taught at the Willamette University College of Medicine.

== Possible identification as Judge Holden ==
Veatch has been considered a popular candidate for the historical Judge Holden, mentioned in Samuel Chamberlain's autobiography My Confession: Recollections of a Rogue and, later, the historical novel Blood Meridian by Cormac McCarthy. Like Holden, Veatch either commanded or was second in command of a scalp-hunting party into Mexico. Holden was also a polymath, skilled in the very same areas as Veatch, such as geography. Others have speculated that Charles Wilkins Webber is another possible historical identification for Judge Holden.
