= The Judge =

The Judge may refer to:

== Literature ==
- Judge (magazine), 1881—1947 American weekly satirical magazine
- The Judge, 1889 novel by Elia W. Peattie
- The Judge, 1925 American translation of The Old Man (Gorky play), 1915
- The Judge, 1922 novel by Rebecca West
- The Judge, 2010 English translation of Le Juge, 1959
- The Judge, 1995 novel by Steve Martini
- The Judges, 1999 novel by Elie Wiesel

== People ==
- Milt Hinton (1910–2000), American jazz bassist nicknamed "The Judge"
- Frank Robinson (1935–2018), American baseball player nicknamed "The Judge"
- Andrew Napolitano, former New Jersey Superior Court judge and now host of the television show Freedom Watch
- Aaron Judge, nickname for American baseball player
- Judge Holden, probably fictional character

== Film and TV ==
=== Film ===
- The Judge (1949 film), a 1949 American film
- The Judge (1960 film), a 1960 Swedish film
- The Judge (1984 film), a 1984 French crime drama film
- The Judge (2014 film), a 2014 American film
- The Judge, a 2017 documentary film directed by Erika Cohn

=== TV ===
- The Judge (TV series), a syndicated television drama that ran from 1986–1993
- "The Judge" (Millennium), a 1996 season one episode of Millennium
- "The Judge" (The Blacklist), a 2014 episode of TV series The Blacklist
- The Judge (BoJack Horseman) a 2017 episode of BoJack Horseman

== Music ==
- "The Judge" (song), a song by Twenty One Pilots from their album Blurryface
- "The Judge", a song by Soul Asylum from their 1986 album While You Were Out

=== Miscellaneous ===
- Taurus Judge, a revolver produced by Taurus International
- "The Judge", a variant of the Pontiac GTO sports car from 1969 to 1971

== The Judges ==
The Judges may refer to:

- Book of Judges, one of the books of the Old Testament of the Bible
- The Hebrew Bible judges, the translated name commonly given to the chief magistrates of the Hebrews
- Brandeis Judges, the varsity athletics teams at Brandeis University
- The Judges (demogroup), a Commodore 64 demogroup

== See also ==
- Judge
- Judge (disambiguation)
