= John Joel Glanton =

American outlaw and soldier (1819–1850)

- Born: 1819; Edgefield County, South Carolina, U.S.
- Died: April 23, 1850; Arizona, U.S.
- Occupation: Outlaw
- Known for: Scalp-hunting, mass-murder

John Joel Glanton (c. 1819 – April 23, 1850) was an early settler of Arkansas Territory. He was also a Texas Ranger and a soldier in the Mexican–American War and the leader of a notorious gang of scalp-hunters in Northern Mexico and the Southwestern United States during the mid-19th century. Contemporary sources also describe him as a murderous outlaw and prominent participant in the Texas Revolution. He appears as a violent figure in the works of the prominent Western writers Larry McMurtry and Cormac McCarthy.

== Biography ==
=== Early life ===
John Joel Glanton was born with his twin, Julian, in Edgefield County, South Carolina, in 1819. His father Charles William Glanton (1789–1826) died while he was young, and his mother, Margaret Hill Glanton, relocated her four sons to Louisiana. In 1832, she remarried to Major John Roddy, a wealthy South Carolinian veteran of the War of 1812, eventually bearing two children by him. In 1835, she followed him to Jackson County in the Arkansas Territory, where the family established Walnut Woods, a plantation with more than twenty slaves near what is now Augusta.

=== Texan Independence ===
Little is certain about Glanton's youth, but he developed a reputation for explosive violence. He appears in few records until his 1841 arrest in Louisiana but later authors state he fled Tennessee as an outlaw before settling in Gonzales, Texas. He took part in the first battle of the 1835 Texian Revolution against Mexico's Centralist Republic. His fiancée was abducted, scalped, and killed by Lipan Apaches before or during his time with Stephen F. Austin at the siege of De Cos's forces in San Antonio. He was said to have been a scout under Col. James Fannin, commissioned as a captain of the Texas Rangers while still 16, and to have narrowly escaped De La Portilla's massacre of Fannin's men at Goliad on March 27, 1836. After the Battle of San Jacinto, President Sam Houston supposedly banished Glanton from Texas, although this was never enforced and no record of such an order survives. He was later said to have wounded or killed the best men on both sides of the Regulator–Moderator War without supporting either side himself.

Glanton was arrested in New Orleans on March 11, 1841, for assault, having tried to shoot a police officer with his pistol in the American Theatre, but he was dismissed with little or no punishment, since no one was hurt. In early 1843, Glanton applied for a 320-acre grant of land in Jackson County, Arkansas. He improved the land but, receiving no certificate of purchase, he transferred his claim to his brother Benjamin in 1845 and returned to Louisiana. He was still receiving his mail in New Orleans in September 1846 but had apparently already returned to Texas.

=== Mexican–American War ===
By the time of the Mexican–American War, he was part of Walter P. Lane's San Antonio company of Texas Rangers. Contemporary sources charged him with killing a Mexican civilian in Magdalena, New Mexico, while serving as a perimeter sentry in 1847. Glanton defended himself, saying the civilian had ignored his commands to halt. This event brought Walter P. Lane—then a major in the army—into conflict with his general Zachary Taylor. Glanton evaded the military police sent to arrest him but then enlisted in John Coffee Hays's second regiment of the First Texas Mounted Rifles, also informally known as the Texan Rangers. He saw action as part of Gen. Winfield Scott 's Mexico City campaign, during which Private Glanton was noted by Gen. Joseph Lane to have "attracted general notice for his extraordinary activity and daring throughout the actions both of the 23rd & 24th" Nov. 1847 at Galaxara Pass in Puebla.

=== Glanton organization ===
After the summer of 1849, Glanton and his employees were hired by Mexican authorities to eliminate Apaches in northern Mexico and what is now part of the Southwestern United States. For increased income, their organization scalped Native war tribes who had been attacking settlers in America and Mexico to claim the bounty for scalps. The soldier and memoirist Samuel Chamberlain claimed he worked as a member of the organization. According to Chamberlain, Glanton's second-in-command was a Texian known as Judge Holden. Reneging on their contracts, the state of Chihuahua put a bounty on the heads of the organization, declaring them outlaws in December 1849. Chihuahuan authorities drove them out to Sonora. Eventually they wore out their Sonoran welcome and moved north into the Arizona territory.

=== Death ===
In Arizona, the Glanton organization became partners in a ferry at the Yuma Crossing of the Colorado River, a popular crossing for settlers and prospectors traveling to and from California during the California Gold Rush. According to claims from competing ferry operators, the Glantons sometimes killed Mexican and American passengers returning from the gold-fields to take their money and goods. Other accounts claim they destroyed a boat and killed some Quechans operating a rival ferry near Pilot Knob. At dawn on April 23, 1850, a band of Quechans led by Caballo en Pelo killed him with an axe and scalped Glanton and most of his organization to establish the tribe's ferry monopoly. Hearing of the massacre, California officials recruited a militia in the ill-fated Gila Expedition against the Quechan tribe.

== In popular culture ==
- Jeremiah Clemens includes Glanton as a character in his novel Bernard Lile (1856), one of the earliest fictional works concerning the Texas Revolution.
- Samuel Chamberlain, who claimed to have been a member of the gang, wrote an account of their activities in his memoir, My Confession.
- Glanton, under the name Gallantin, is a character in George MacDonald Fraser's Flashman and the Redskins (1982), an installment in the long-running The Flashman Papers series of comic novels.
- A fictionalized version of Glanton and his gang is featured prominently in Cormac McCarthy's novel Blood Meridian (1985), many of the events of which are based on Chamberlain's account.
- Glanton, along with another historical scalp hunter, James Kirker, appears briefly in the opening scenes of Larry McMurtry's novel Dead Man's Walk (1995). The book is the first volume of McMurtry's Lonesome Dove tetralogy.
- The seven-page story "A Scalp for a Scalp", drawn by Russ Heath and written by John Whalen, also based on Chamberlain's memoir, is included in The Big Book of the Weird Wild West published by Paradox Press in 1998.
- Hugues Micol's graphic novel Scalp: La Chevauchée funèbre de John Glanton et de ses compagnons de carnage, based on Chamberlain's book, was published in 2017 by the French publisher Futuropolis.
- A 2005 episode of the History Channel series Wild West Tech featured an account of the Glanton Gang, focusing on Glanton's misdeeds as a scalp hunter. These scenes were filmed at Old Tucson Studios near Tucson, Arizona.
- In Kevin Costner's film Horizon: An American Saga – Chapter 1 (2024) there is a subplot that is based upon the Glanton gang.
