= Leeman =

Leeman may refer to:

== People ==
- Don Leeman, American politician
- Gary Leeman (born 1964), ice hockey player
- George Leeman (1809–1882), MP for York, England and chairman of the North Eastern Railway
- Kimberly Leemans, model
- Paul Leeman (born 1978), Northern Irish footballer
- Leeman Bennett (born 1938), American football coach

== Places ==
- Leeman, Wisconsin, United States
- Leeman, Western Australia

== Sports ==
- Lee Man FC, a Hong Kong professional football club

== See also ==
- Leaman (disambiguation)
- Leemans
- Lehman (disambiguation)
- Lehmann (disambiguation)
- Leman (disambiguation)
