= Alemann =

Alemann is a German surname. Notable people with the surname include:

- Claudia von Alemann (born 1943), German film director
- Ernesto Alemann (1893–1982), Argentine newspaper editor
- Katja Alemann, Argentine actress and writer
- Roberto Alemann (1922–2020), Argentine lawyer, economist, publisher and academic

== See also ==
- Aleman (disambiguation)
