= Tuscan Springs =

Geothermal feature in California

- Lick Springs
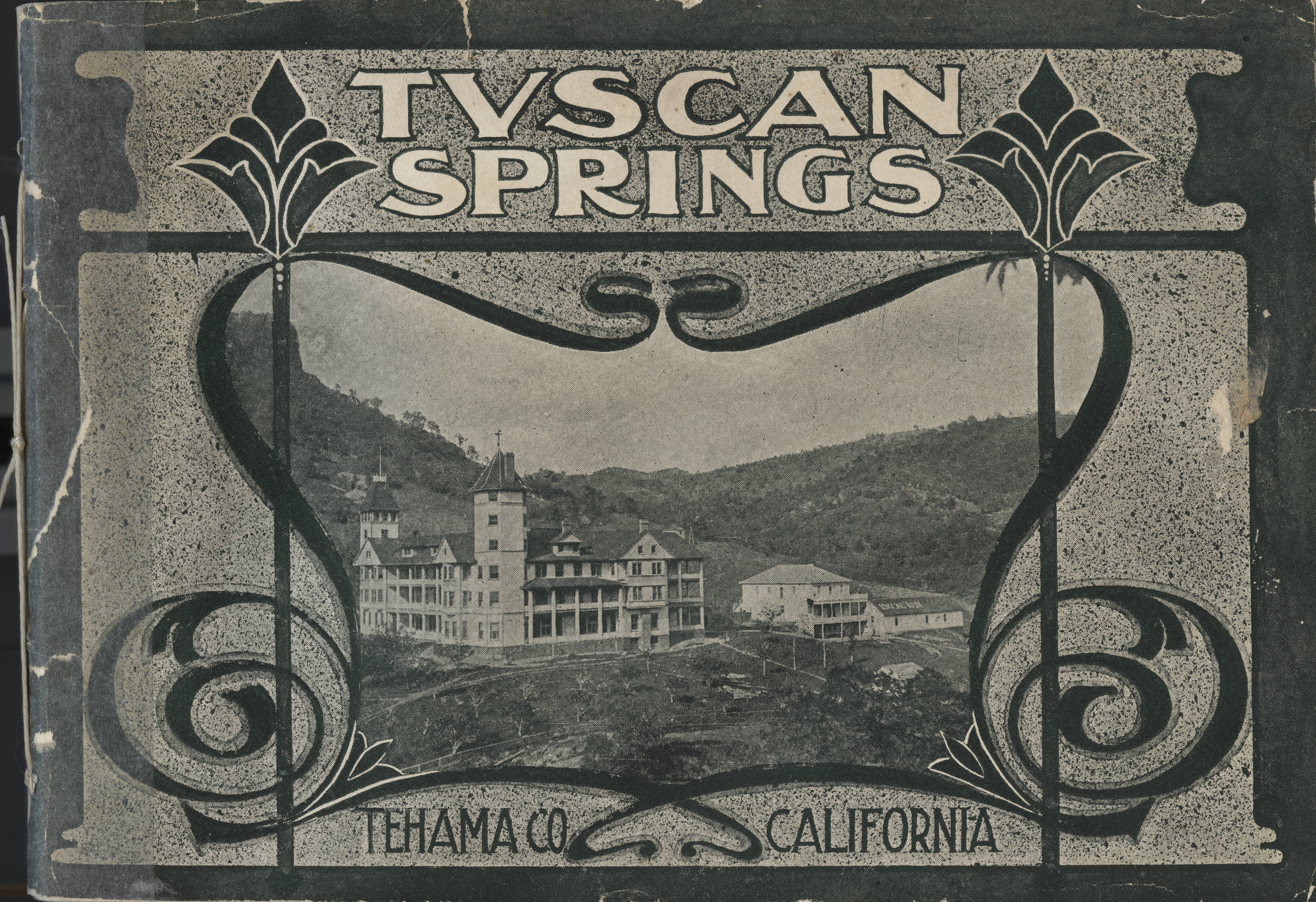
- Tuscan Springs advertising booklet cover (Cal State Chico Library Special Collections)
- Interactive map of Tuscan Springs
- Coordinates: 40.2407°N 122.1116°W
- Elevation: 1,000 feet (300 m)
- Discharge: 190 liters/minute
- Temperature: 30 °C (86 °F)
- Depth: 21,500 metres (70,500 ft)

Tuscan Springs are a group of springs in Tehama County of the U.S. state of California. Tuscan Springs was named for the fact its borax-impregnated waters were chemically similar to the springs of Tuscany, in Italy.

== History ==
Tuscan Springs is considered the site of the "first discovery of borax on the American continent" on January 8, 1856, by Dr. John A. Veatch. While evaporating water from the springs he identified the mineral, eventually producing several pounds but not enough to be commercially valuable; also, "free boric acid [was] found as an efflorescence around the springs."

By 1861, a three-story hotel, cottages, bathhouses, and a heated swimming pool were present at the springs. The property passed between several owners for the rest of the nineteenth century.

In 1907 a book published by California boosters described the springs and associated resort hotel as being located in "an ancient crater whose fires went out many thousands of years ago. Within this huge punch-bowl, at an altitude of a thousand feet above sea-level, are located the Tuscan Springs and hotel. The springs are nine miles east from Red Bluff...and are easily reached from all points. A daily stage runs from Red Bluff to the springs, and on the spot there are telegraph, telephone, and post-office facilities. The $60,000 hotel rises on a slight eminence within the crater. The interior of the tavern is not excelled by that of any hotel or resort in Northern California. All accommodations that are to be had in metropolitan cities are provided here. All important periodicals are on file, mail service daily, telephone communication to any part of the State, and every convenience that makes for the comfort of guests." In 1916 a guidebook to California health resorts stated, "There are over 20 springs here, but only three are used for drinking, while the fourth, or 'Fountain Spring,' supplies the bath-house and swimming-pool. The waters are all strongly saline and strongly sulphuretted and all but the 'Natural Gas Spring' are rich in Sodium and Potassium Salts."

The original hotel burned in 1900. Another hotel was built on the site, but was also destroyed by fire in 1916 (some sources erroneously list 1912), after which the site was abandoned. By 1973, only ruined foundations and some decorative trees remained at the site.
