= Sam Spence =

American soundtrack composer (1927–2016)

- Spence c. 1960s

Background information
- Born: Samuel Lloyd Spence; March 29, 1927; San Francisco, California, U.S.
- Died: February 6, 2016 (aged 88) Lewisville, Texas, U.S.
- Genre: Film score
- Occupations: Composer; musician
- Years active: 1966–1990

Samuel Lloyd Spence (March 29, 1927 – February 6, 2016) was an American soundtrack composer best known for his work with NFL Films. His music has also been in the EA Sports Madden NFL football video games and many football-related commercials. His music has gained more widespread fame for its frequent use in the soundtracks of other films and television series.

== Biography ==
Spence was born in San Francisco and attended the University of Southern California. In 1966, while working as a music instructor in Munich, he was hired to score the mini-documentaries that conveyed National Football League highlights and personalities to fans in the network-television era. His music cues, combined with the voices of announcers Pat Summerall, Tom Brookshier, Charlie Jones, John Facenda and Harry Kalas, created the trademark style of the NFL's sports highlights films.

Initially, Mahlon Merrick was asked to provide scores for NFL Films. Merrick asked his friend, Spence, to help in the recording sessions. Spence said: "Mahlon had written marches. Toward the end of that recording session, I stuck in a couple of different pieces — my own orchestral compositions with strings and woodwinds, more like a Hollywood film score. It turned out they were Ed Sabol's favorites and he offered me a three-year contract to write, conduct, and produce NFL Films' music."

In Germany, Spence wrote several TV soundtracks with Hani Chamseddine, e.g., for the Francis Durbridge thriller Wie ein Blitz. After his retirement in 1990, he returned to Munich. He achieved unexpected fame in 1998 with the success of a CD compilation entitled The Power and the Glory: The Original Music & Voices Of NFL Films. Spence died at a Lewisville, Texas nursing center on February 6, 2016, at the age of 88.

== Later appearances ==
Spence's music has been performed live several times, with the composer conducting guest residencies with regional orchestras. On June 14, 2008, he guest conducted a medley of his NFL Films hits with the Golden State Pops Orchestra in San Pedro, California, as part of the orchestra's "Pops for Pops" concert. In November 2010, a concert devoted almost entirely to his football scores was staged in Green Bay, Wisconsin. An audience of nearly 1,000 turned out at the historic Meyer Theater downtown for a program that featured three local ensembles—The Civic Symphony of Green Bay, the University of Wisconsin–Green Bay Wind Ensemble, and a big band jazz ensemble—performing a wide range of Spence's football scores, from symphonic to jazz to pop.

== Criticism ==
One of the hallmarks of Spence's music is its intangible familiarity. Two film score enthusiasts have pointed out the similarity of his more popular themes to several contemporary film scores; one has criticized them of "get[ting] too close to their obvious film inspiration". They have lauded some of his compositions as "cool homage[s]", while describing others as "barely disguised" "knock-offs".

== NFL music ==
Over his three-decade career, Spence composed hundreds of short sound-track scores for NFL Films. Some of his more recognizable songs are:

- "A Golden Boy Again" aka "Up She Rises" (orchestral variation of "Drunken Sailor")
- "March to the Trenches" aka "Big Ed's March"
- "Big Game America"
- "Rainbows To The End Zone"
- "The Over the Hill Gang"
- "West Side Rumble"
- "The Pony Soldiers"
- "Round Up"
- "Classic Battle"
- "Forearm Shiver" aka "The Lineman"
- "The Magnificent Eleven"
- "Ramblin' Man from Gramblin'"
- "Whirlwinds To The End Zone"
- "Path To The Title" aka "Cossacks' Charge"
- "Game Plan For Sudden Death"
- "Aggression" aka "Life on the Wild Side"
- "Street Warfare"
- "Sunday With Soul" aka "Pell Mell"
- "A Chilling Championship"
- "Sunday Afternoon Fever"
- "The Equalizer"
- "Final Quest"
- "Industrial Giant"
- "Macho Theme"
- "Torpedo"
- "Police Car"

== Performance rights controversy with NFL Films ==
Spence had long been involved in a controversial situation with the NFL regarding the rights to perform or use his music in any media outlets. The case was first reported by musicologist Alexander Klein in a 2013 article published by Film Score Monthly magazine. Through personal conversations with the composer, Klein reported that Spence was convinced to sign a contract that relinquished all of the rights to his music to NFL Films under the promise that the enterprise would return the document to the composer.

After allegedly receiving a phone call in which NFL Films claimed that his music had been stolen and illicitly used, Spence said, "They would send me a paper to sign to the effect that NFL Films was empowered to protect the music in a court of law. In all sincerity, I did not see a possible 'plot' here at all. However, I unwittingly 'punctured their balloon' by explaining that they didn't have to bother with this at all because GEMA (a German state-authorized performance rights organization) would protect my music and legally proceed after anyone who used it without permission." As Klein reported, "soon afterwards, GEMA sent Spence a video copy of the film and asked him to make a list of "where and how long" his music appeared in it. Thus, the composer dutifully watched the film in order to find possible fragments of his music in it. Yet, the outcome was unexpected." In Spence's own words: "I was surprised to find not one note of my music in the film. Naïve, trusting person that I was, it never dawned on me it could possibly be a hoax to get me to sign a forthcoming document." According to Spence, "the next 'trick' came several months later. I received a phone call in which I was told that NFL Films had a court case in two days against someone who had illegally used some of my music. Their lawyer had sent me a paper via FedEx, which they said would be arriving shortly (in that same afternoon) for my signature. After signed, the FedEx courier would immediately send it back to them so they would have it in time for the court case." According to Klein's report, the composer received the paper in the afternoon and read it but, in Spence's words, "after reading the paper, I called them and said that I could not sign a document with that wording. But they assured me that as soon as the case was over, they would send it back to me." Still unsuspecting, and trusting in the company's words, Spence signed the document and sent it to NFL Films. He never got the paper back and, to this day, the late composer's family is not receiving royalties for the many uses of Spence's music in American television shows and commercials.

== Discography ==
- 1970: "Wie ein Blitz" – Main theme for the Durbridge series on German network TV (Single, Kuckuck Schallplatten)
- 1971: The Art of the Synthesizer – Interesting, Unusual and Melodic Moog Sounds (LP, Kuckuck Schallplatten)
- 1972: Fantastic Sounds: TV Themes and Pop Covers (LP, Kuckuck Schallplatten)
- 1998: The Power And The Glory: The Original Music & Voices of NFL Films
- 2007: Sam Spence: Our Man in Munich (Allscore – Indigo)
- 2009: Autumn Thunder: 40 Years of NFL Films Music
