= Judge (surname) =

Judge is an occupational surname of British origin. The first recorded instance of the surname is in 1309 in the Middle, English Occupation Register, Worcester, England.

Notable people with the surname include:

== In arts and entertainment ==
- Arline Judge (1912–1974), American actress
- Christopher Judge (born 1964), American actor
- David Judge (actor) (born 1983), British actor
- Frank Judge (1946–2021), American poet, publisher, translator, journalist, film critic, teacher, and arts administrator
- Gurbani Judge (born 1987), Indian Actress and Model better known as VJ Bani
- Jack Judge (1872–1938), British songwriter
- Jonathan Judge, American television director and producer
- Malcolm Judge (1918–1989), British cartoonist
- Mark Judge (writer) (born 1964), American author and journalist
- Maureen Judge (born 1955), Canadian filmmaker
- Mike Judge (born 1962), American actor, animator, writer, producer, director and musician
- Simran Judge, Indian-American actor

== In government and politics ==
- Carl Judge (born 1968), Australian politician
- David Judge (born 1950), British political scientist
- Francis G. Judge (1908–1994), American politician
- Igor Judge (1941–2023), British judge
- John Judge (politician) (born 1944), American politician
- Patty Judge (born 1943), American politician
- Thomas Lee Judge (1934–2006), American politician
- Virginia Judge (born 1956), Australian former politician

== In religion ==
- Mychal Judge (1933–2001), American Catholic priest
- William Judge (1850–1899), American Jesuit priest
- William Quan Judge (1851–1896), Irish-American mystic, esotericist, occultist, Theosophist

== In sport ==
- Aaron Judge (born 1992), American baseball player
- Alan Judge (English footballer) (born 1960)
- Alan Judge (Irish footballer) (born 1988)
- Betty Judge (1921–2015), Australian athlete
- David Judge (field hockey) (1936–2015), Irish field hockey player and coach, represented Great Britain at the 1964 Olympics
- Joe Judge (baseball) (1894–1963), American baseball player
- Joe Judge (American football) (born 1981), American football coach
- Joe Judge (footballer) (born 1947), Scottish footballer
- Ken Judge (1958–2016), Australian football player and coach
- Matthew Judge (born 1985), English footballer
- Michael Judge (born 1975), Irish snooker player
- Peter Judge (cricketer) (1916–1992), British cricketer
- Samantha Judge (born 1978), British hockey player
- Tim Judge (born 1964), American former professional bicycle motocross racer

== In other fields ==
- Anthony Judge (born 1940), Australian knowledge management researcher
- Barbara Judge (1946–2020), American-British lawyer and businesswoman
- Bernard M. Judge (1940–2019), American journalist
- Darrell Lynn Judge (1934–2014), American physicist
- Joan Judge, British history professor
- Mark Judge (architect), British architect
- Oney Judge (1773–1848), American slave of George Washington's family
- Paul Judge (1949–2017), British businessman and government advisor, endowed Cambridge Judge Business School

== See also ==
- Judge (disambiguation)
