= Bartholomeus Meyburgh =

Dutch Golden Age painter

Bartholomeus Meyburgh (c.1628–1708), also spelt Meijburch, Meyburch, and Meyburg, was a Dutch Golden Age painter known for his portraits and religious works.

== Biography ==
Bartholomeus Meyburgh was born in Maassluis or The Hague, Netherlands, probably in 1628, although some sources have suggested 1623, 1624 and 1625. His surname has been variously spelt Meijburch, Meyburch, and Meyburg.

According to the painter Arnold Houbraken (1660–1719), Meyburgh was a good portrait and history painter born in "Maaslandsluis" (Maasluis), who was a friend of the painter Christoffel Pierson, who was only three years younger than he, but whom he taught to paint in 1651. Together they made a trip to Germany in 1653. During his lifetime he painted for various courts in Germany and was still alive in 1661.

He worked in Maassluis until 1653, before travelling to and within Germany with his pupil Pierson, where they painted Swedish military commander Carl Gustav Wrangel in Bremervörde on their return journey. Around 1661 Meyburgh moved to The Hague, where he married Anna Elisbeth Schortes in that year, and also became a member of the Confrerie Pictura. The Confrerie records state that he was born in The Hague.

He was registered in Germany in the years 1684 to 1689, where he worked in several courts, after which he returned to The Hague. He died in 1708 or 1709, possibly in The Hague.

== Work ==
He is known for portraits and religious works and as a court painter, and also painted animals. His style was influenced by Dordrecht portrait painter Nicolaes Maes; other contemporaneous Dutch artists who painted in similar styles include Jacobus Levecq, Adriaen Hanneman and Jan de Baen.

The Queen of England and the Queen of Bohemia were patrons, and his work is held today in Museum Kunstpalast.
