= Lahman =

Lahman is a surname. Notable people with the surname include:

- Bertha Marion Lahman (1872–1954), American botanist
- Eyal Lahman (born 1965), Israeli football manager
- Otokar Lahman (1899–1977), Croatian writer and demographer
- Sean Lahman (born 1968), American writer and researcher

== See also ==
- Lahmansville, West Virginia, named for the Lahman family who settled in the area prior to West Virginia statehood
- Lahmann
