= Johannes Leemans =

Dutch painter

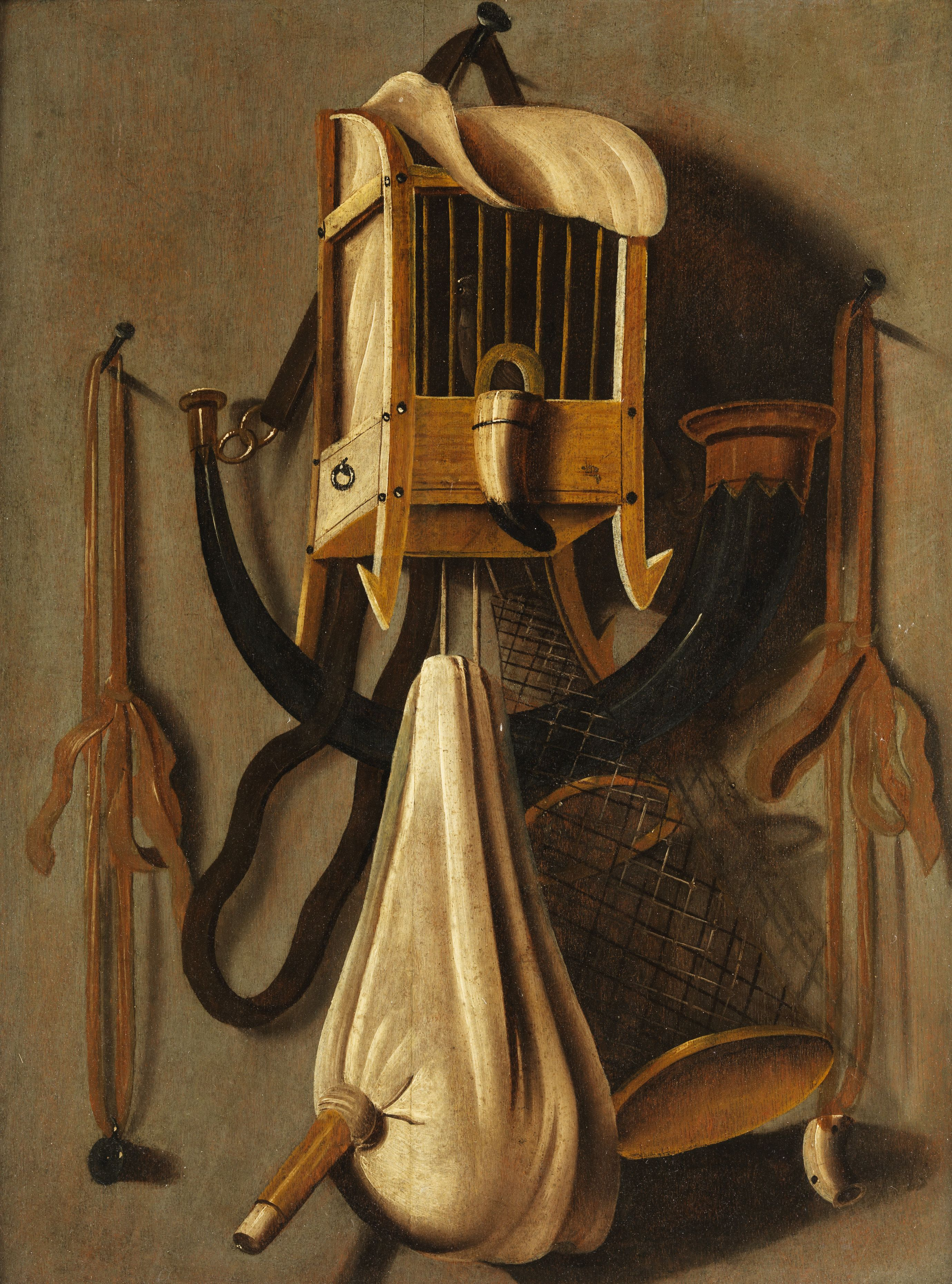
Hunting still life, by Leemans

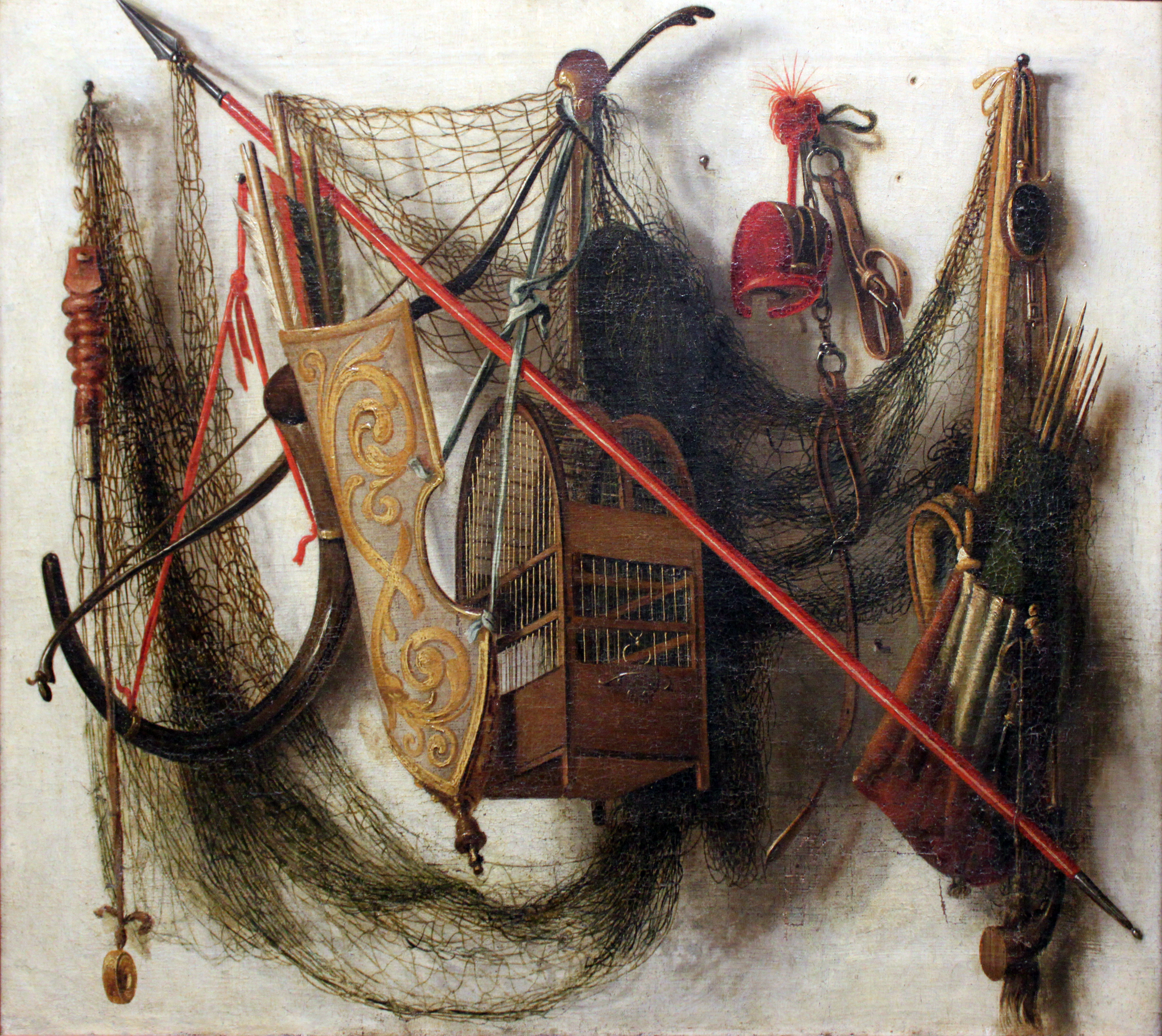
Still life with hunting weapons and devices, 1669, Germanisches Nationalmuseum, Nuremberg

Johannes Leemans (1633, The Hague – 1688, The Hague), was a Dutch Golden Age painter.

== Biography ==
According to Houbraken, who did not specify which brother he meant, he made a profitable living making trompe l'oeil paintings of hunting paraphernalia, birdcages, and weaponry.

According to the RKD he was the younger brother of the painter Anthonie Leemans, and both are known for still life paintings of hunting paraphernalia and vanitas pieces that became an influence on Christoffel Pierson for their popularity. Johannes was also a wine dealer in addition to being a painter. He lived and worked in The Hague, but is registered in Amsterdam in 1671.
