= Bertha Marion Lahman =

American botanist (1872–1950)

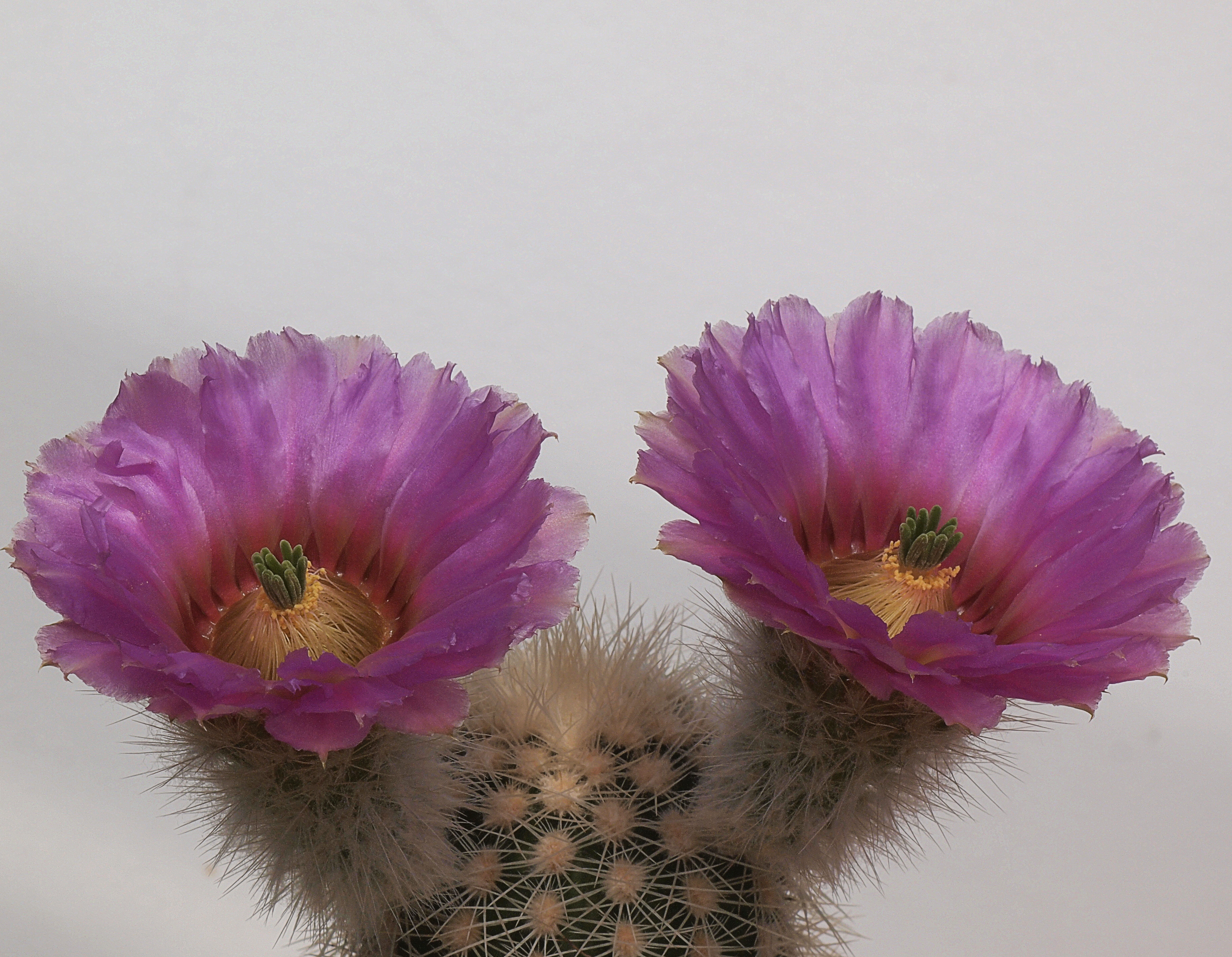
Echinocereus Albispinus are one of the species Lahman is credited with cataloging. This is a subspecies of this species.

Bertha Marion (née Sherwood) Lahman (December 5, 1872–February 11, 1954) was an American botanist specializing in the cacti of Oklahoma.

== Biography ==
Bertha Marion Sherwood was born on December 5, 1872, in Tiskilwa, Illinois, to Theodore and Eucla Sherwood. She attended local public schools before graduating from the University of Michigan with a bachelor's degree in biology in 1897. She later attended the University of Chicago receiving a master's degree in botany.

She married Charles S. Lahman in July 1898 in Milwaukee, Wisconsin, and the couple moved to Stillwater, Oklahoma Territory in 1899. She moved to Vinita in 1902, Tulsa in 1913, Ponca City in 1923, and Tulsa again in 1927, and studied flora in each town. She was an active suffragette, served on the Tulsa Council of Defense during World War I, and was a chairwoman of the Tulsa County Republican Committee.

Lahman was appointed by Governor Lee Cruce to investigate European agricultural practices and conditions and prepare a report. She died on February 11, 1956, in Tulsa.

== Contributions to botany ==
The standard author abbreviation Lahman is used to indicate this person as the author when citing a botanical name.

Lahman specialized in the cacti of Oklahoma. Lahman is credited with the cataloging of at least thirteen different species of cacti. Her work is recognized in the journal of the Cactus and Succulent Society of America in all issues following 1932.
