= Aleman =

Aleman may refer to:

== Places ==
- Aleman, Iran, a village in Gilan Province
- Aleman, New Mexico a locale along the Jornada del Muerto in Sierra County, New Mexico

== Other uses ==
- Aleman (surname)
- A member of the Alamanni, a German tribe

== See also ==
- Alemann, a German surname
