= Laomian =

Laomian may refer to:

- Laomian language, a Loloish language of Yunnan, China
- Lo mein, a Chinese noodle dish
