= Leaman (surname) =

Leaman is a surname. Notable people with the surname include:

- Clifford Leaman, American classical saxophonist; professor of Saxophone at the University of South Carolina
- David Leaman, Tasmanian author, structural geologist, geo-hydrologist and geophysicist
- Graham Leaman (1920–1985), featured in five Doctor Who serials
- Jack Leaman (1932–2004), head coach of the University of Massachusetts men's basketball team from 1966
- Louisa Leaman (born 1976), writer and behaviour expert based in London, UK
- Nate Leaman (born 1972), American ice hockey coach
- Oliver Leaman, Professor of Philosophy and Zantker; professor of Judaic Studies
- Richard Leaman (born 1956), British charity executive and former senior Royal Navy officer
