= The Lineman =

Instrumental by Ralph Dollimore

"The Lineman," originally titled "Man, Go Man," is an instrumental composed by Ralph Dollimore. The best-known version of the song is a cover version that was produced by Sam Spence, which has been featured in many NFL Films highlights videos and documentaries.

This song is also predominant in Mermaid Man and Barnacle Boy episodes of SpongeBob SquarePants, usually playing in the title cards. The song was also played in The Simpsons episode "The Twisted World of Marge Simpson". It has also been played in an advertisement for the PlayStation JAMPACK demo discs.

This song was also played in a trailer for the Nickelodeon and DreamWorks show The Penguins of Madagascar.

This song is heard in a Dora the Explorer promo for Super Spies 2: The Swiping Machine.

This song was also played in a scene from The Henry and June Show, a failed pilot featuring the main hosts from Nickelodeon's KaBlam!.

This song is also the main theme for the trailer of the DS game Club Penguin: Elite Penguin Force.

This song was also featured in the Sam Spence album Power and Glory: The Original Music & Voice of NFL Films.

The song was briefly heard in the official trailer for Hamster & Gretel and has also played in a few other promos for that show ever since.

The song also played in the 1999 test pilot for Back at the Barnyard.

Sam Spence’s version is played in Dodger Stadium by DJ Severe when the Dodgers score runs back to back.
