= Allemann =

Allemann is a surname (a variant of Allman, Alleman). Notable people with the surname include:

- Anton Allemann (1936–2008), Swiss footballer
- Cyndie Allemann (born 1986), Swiss race driver
- Rudolf K. Allemann, Swiss biological chemist
- Urs Allemann (1948–2024), Swiss writer and journalist
- Willy Allemann (born 1942), Swiss footballer
