= Anthonie Leemans =

Dutch Golden Age painter

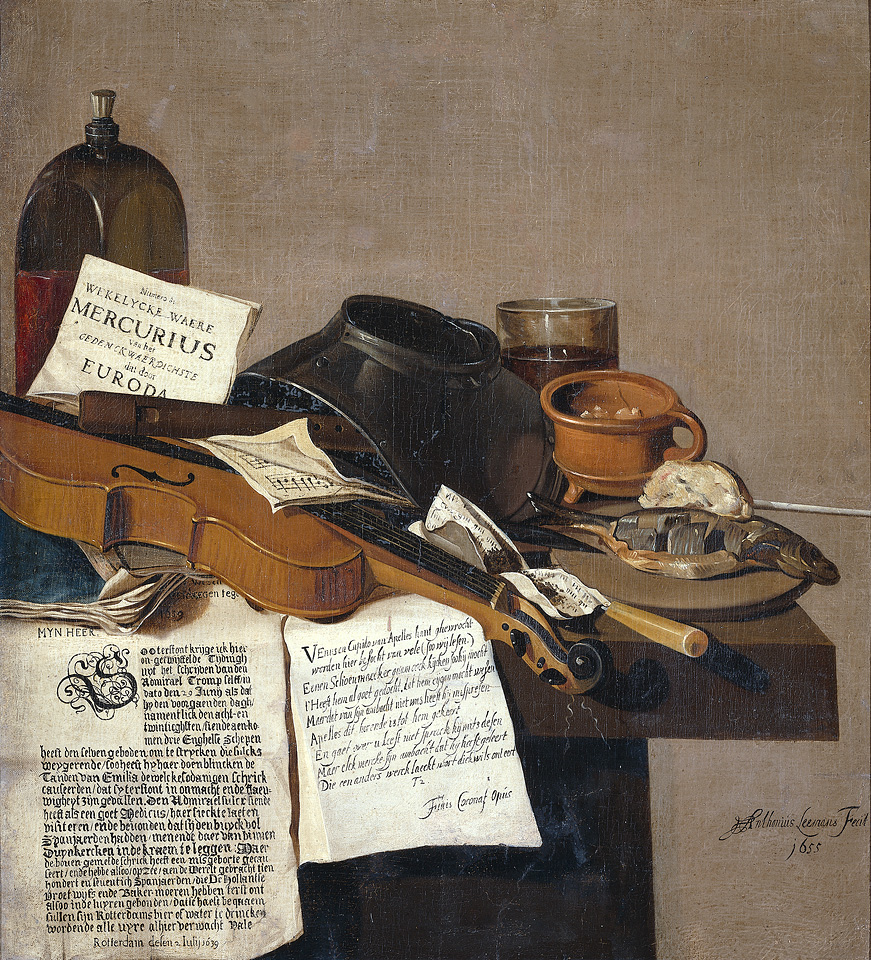
Still life with a book showing the titlepage of "Wekelycke Waere Mercurius", a periodical by Pieter Casteleyn, first published in Haarlem in the 1650s

Anthonie Leemans (1631 in The Hague – 1673 in Amsterdam), was a Dutch Golden Age painter.

== Biography ==
According to Houbraken, who did not specify which brother he meant, he made a profitable living making trompe l'oeil paintings of hunting paraphernalia, birdcages, and weaponry.

According to the RKD he was the older brother of the painter Johannes Leemans, and both are known for still life paintings of hunting paraphernalia and vanitas pieces that became an influence on Christoffel Pierson for their popularity. Anthonie also painted a few Italianate landscapes with soldiers.
