= Lineman =

Lineman or linesman may refer to:

In personal roles:

- Lineworker, one who installs and maintains electrical power, telephone, or telegraph lines
- Lineman (gridiron football), a position in American football
- Head linesman, the American football official in charge of the chain crew
- Assistant referee (association football) or linesman
- Linesmen, officials in ice hockey
- Line umpire, an official in tennis

In other uses:

- Western Union splice or Lineman splice, a type of electrical wiring splice
- "The Lineman", a song composed by Sam Spence for Associated Production Music
- La Linea (TV series) or Lineman, an Italian animated short series
- Linesman/Mediator Air Defence RADAR system
- Lineman (2024 multilingual film), an Indian Kannada and Telugu-language comedy drama film
- Lineman (2024 Tamil film), an Indian Tamil-language drama film

== See also ==
- "Wichita Lineman", a song written by Jimmy Webb in 1968, first recorded by Glen Campbell and widely covered since
