= Lahmann =

Lahmann is a German surname. Notable people with the surname include:

- Heinrich Lahmann (1860–1905), German physician
- Carlos Echandi (1900–1938), Costa Rican surgeon

== See also ==
- Lahman
- Lehmann
