= Christoffel Pierson =

Dutch painter

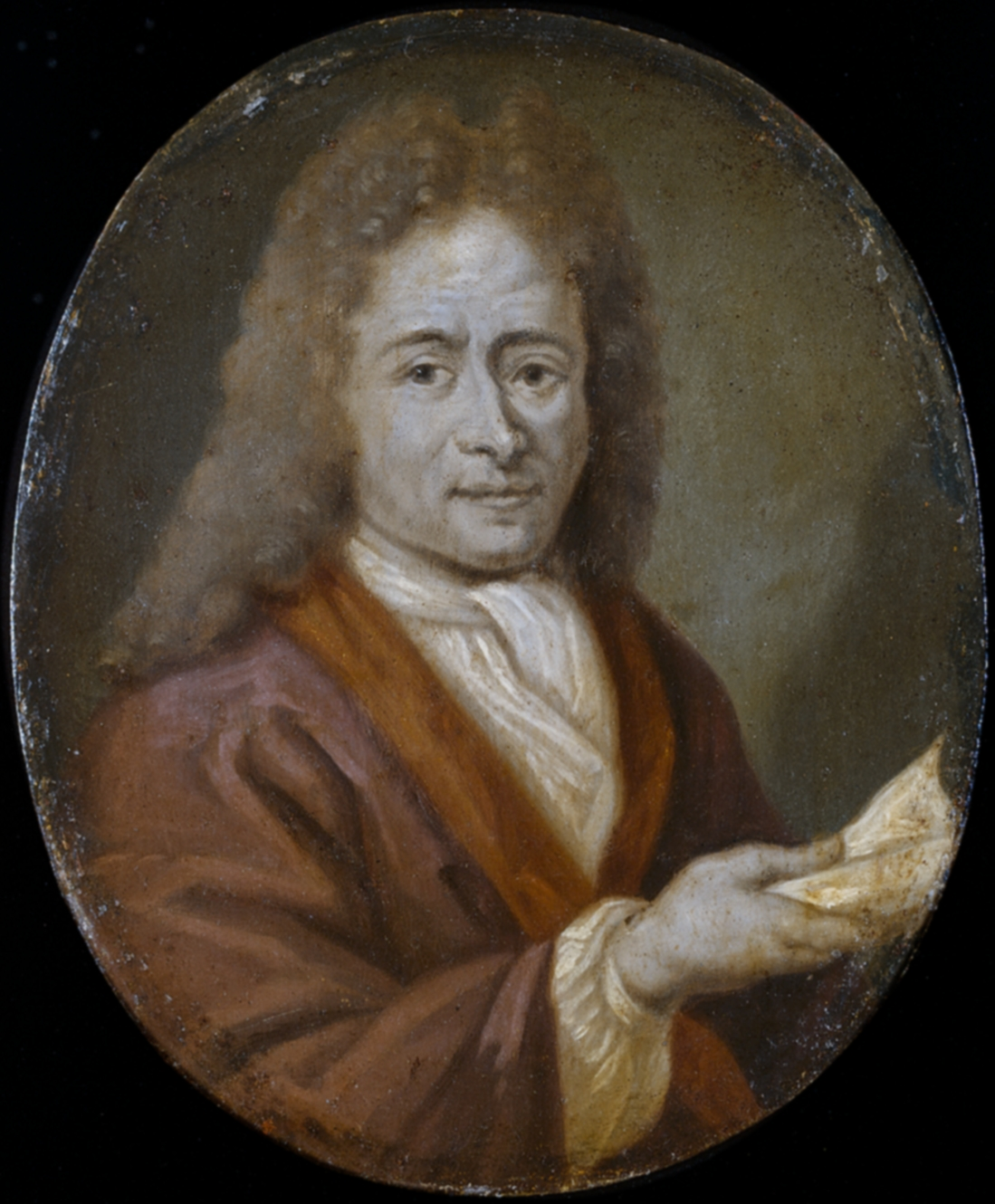
- Portrait by Arnoud van Halen.
- Born: Christoffel Pierson; 19 May 1631; The Hague
- Died: 11 August 1714 (aged 83); Gouda
- Known for: Painting
- Movement: Baroque

Christoffel Pierson (19 May 1631 – 11 August 1714) was a Dutch Golden Age painter.

== Biography ==
According to Arnold Houbraken, Pierson was brought up to become a merchant. Schooled in Latin, French and drawing, he spent time as a clerk (in a "comptoir"), but showed more talent for painting, which he learned from friend Bartholomeus Meyburgh, who was only three years older than he. In 1651-1652 he spent a year studying with Meyburgh, then he moved to Schiedam, where he married his first wife in 1652. In 1653 he travelled with Meyburgh to Germany. On the way back they travelled through Bremervörde, where they met with the Swedish Army, and Pierson painted the portrait of Field Marshal Carl Gustaf Wrangel. The field marshal was so satisfied that he offered both men the chance of becoming court painter to Queen Christina, but they turned it down, Meyburgh because he didn't want to, and Pierson because he had only married six months beforehand.

Upon his return to the Netherlands Pierson moved his household to Gouda, South Holland where, inspired by the success of Anthonie Leemans, he made a profitable living making similar trompe l'oeil paintings of hunting paraphernalia, birdcages, and weaponry. He was so successful at this that many were fooled into believing that these objects truly hung on the wall. In Gouda he also made drawings on parchment of the famous stained glass windows of the Janskerk (Gouda), including those by the brothers Dirk Crabeth and Wouter Crabeth I, for the Gouda city council. After the death of his first wife, he remarried a woman from Schiedam and moved back there in 1679, where he lived until 1691 before returning to Gouda, where he later died.

He was also a good poet, and wrote as many poems as he made paintings. The painter and printmaker Arnoud van Halen made a portrait of him for his cabinet of poets, which, at the time Houbraken was writing, totalled more than 100 portraits.

His last play, Dagobert, was published in the year of his death, 1714.

Although he worked in several locations, most notably in Gouda and Schiedam, he is registered only in 1685 as a member of the Schiedam Guild of St. Luke.

Artwork selection

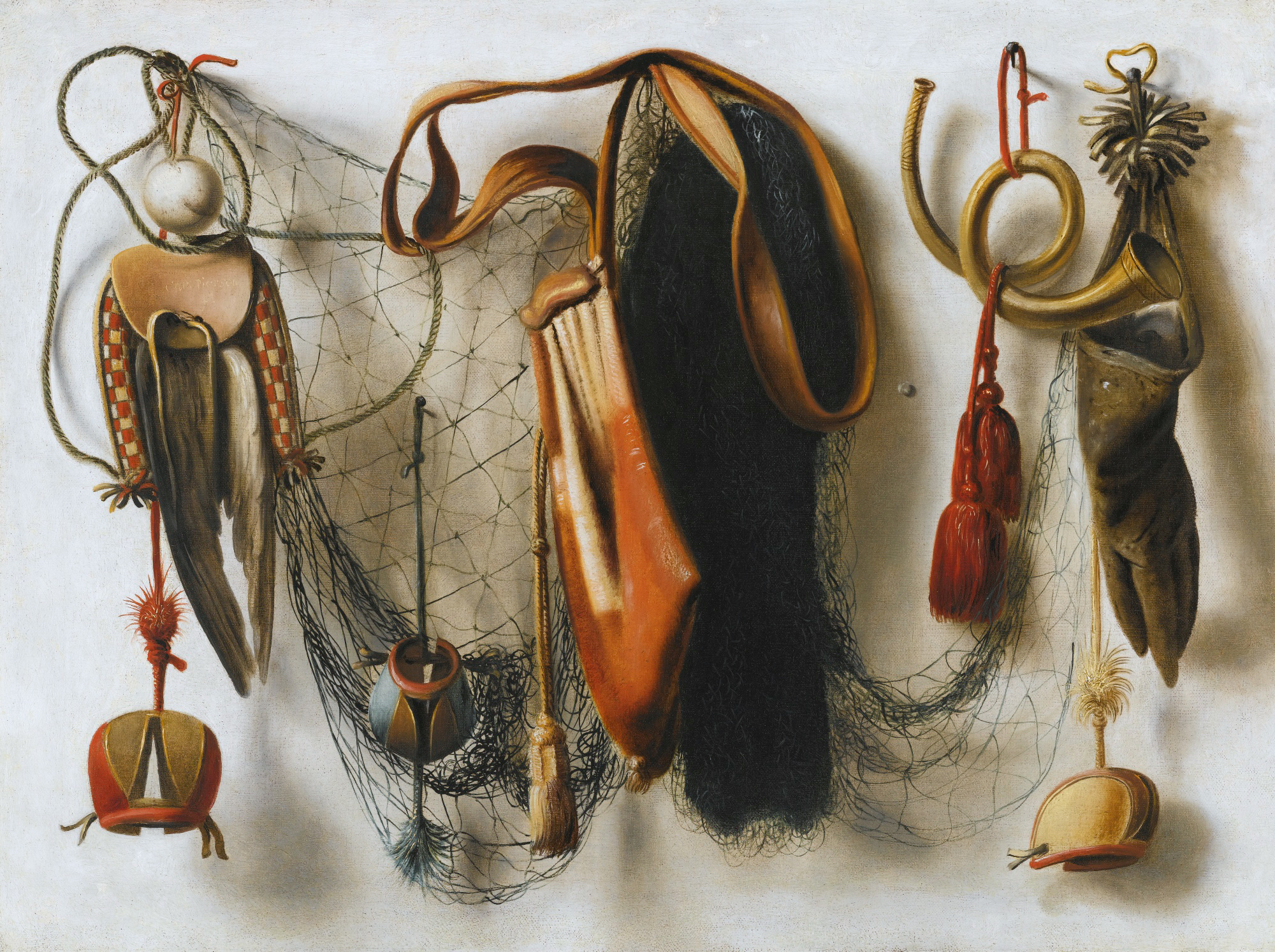
Trompe-l'œil with hawking equipment.

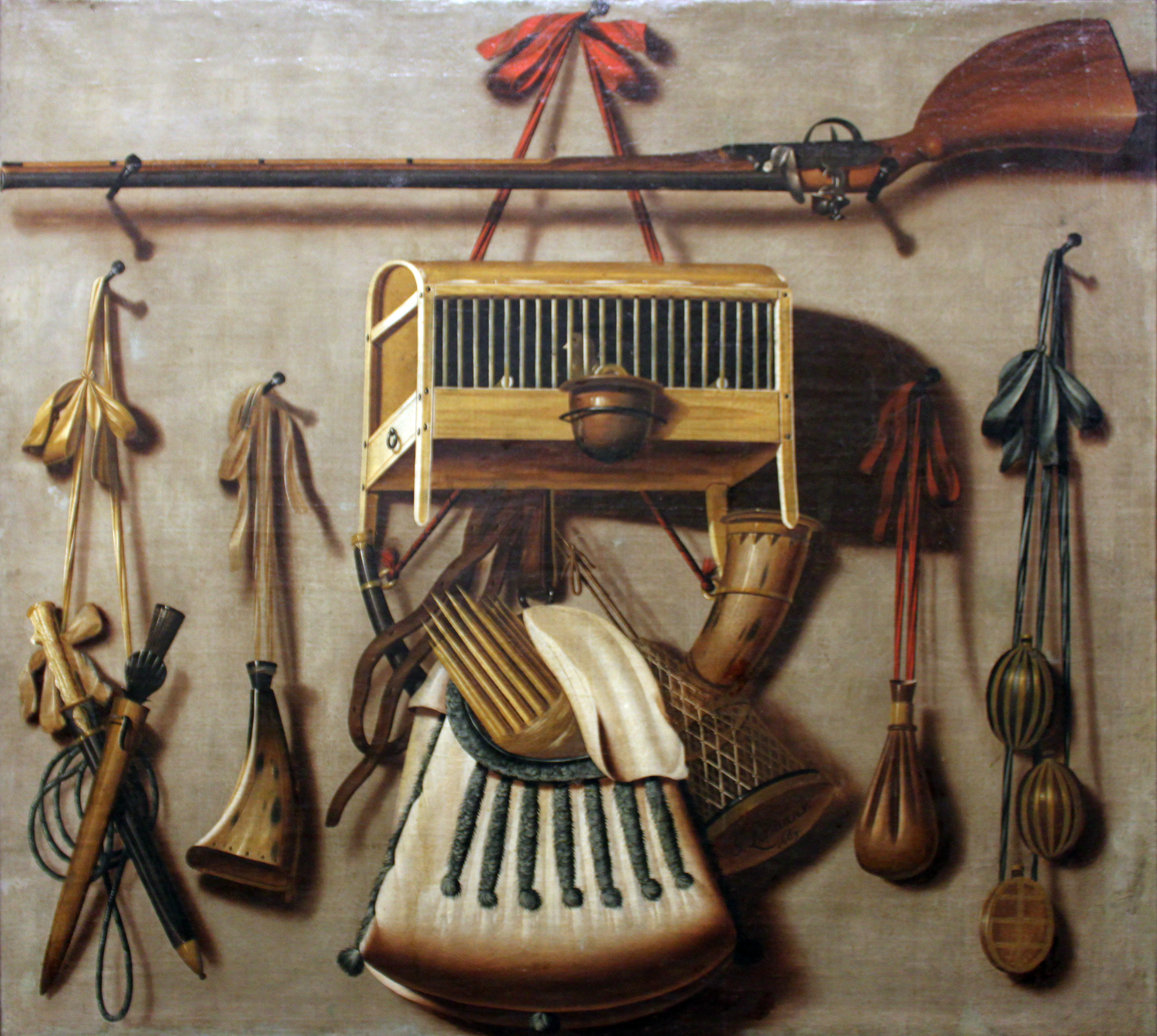
Still life with hunting weapons and devices.

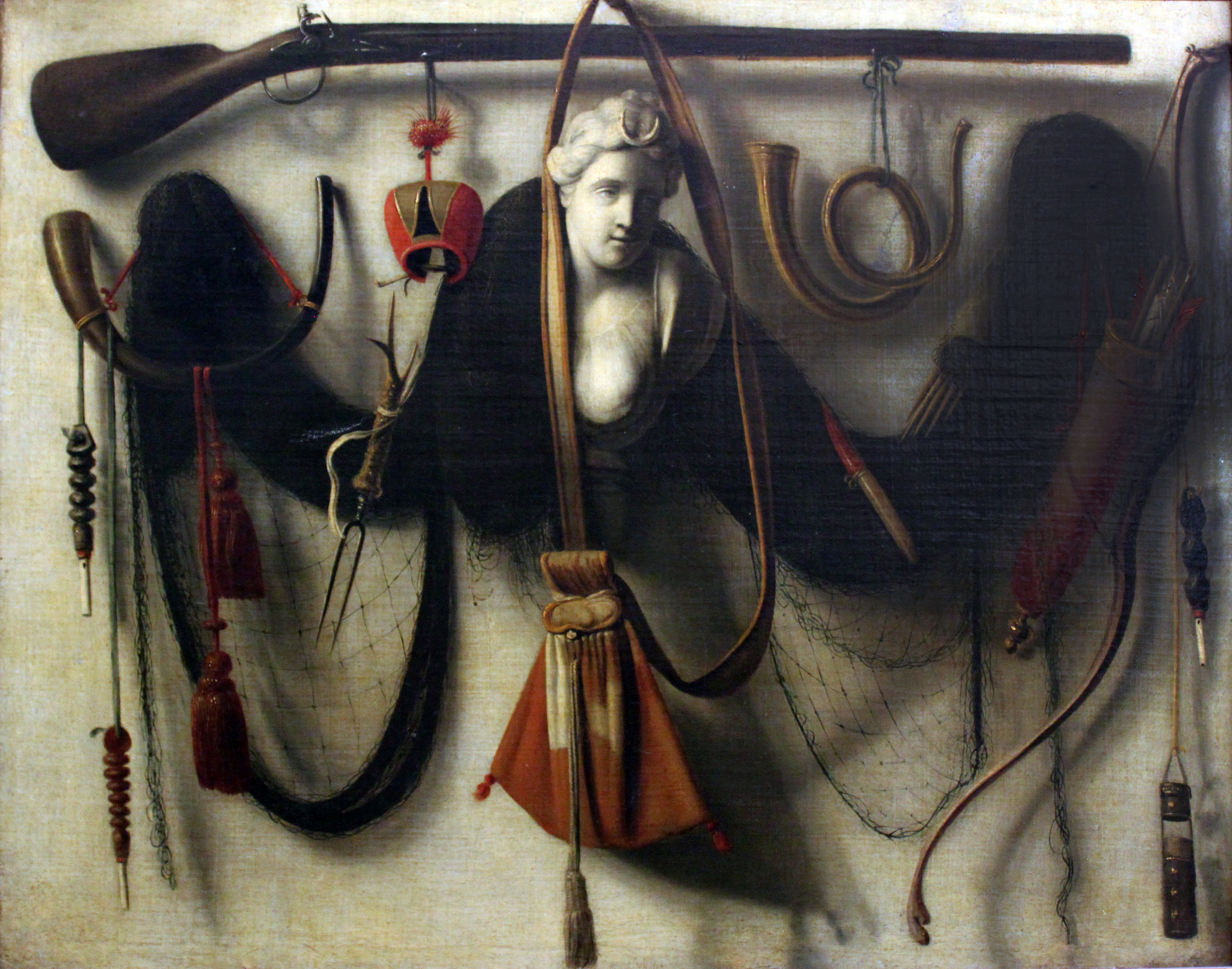
Still life with bust of Artemis, hunting weapons and devices

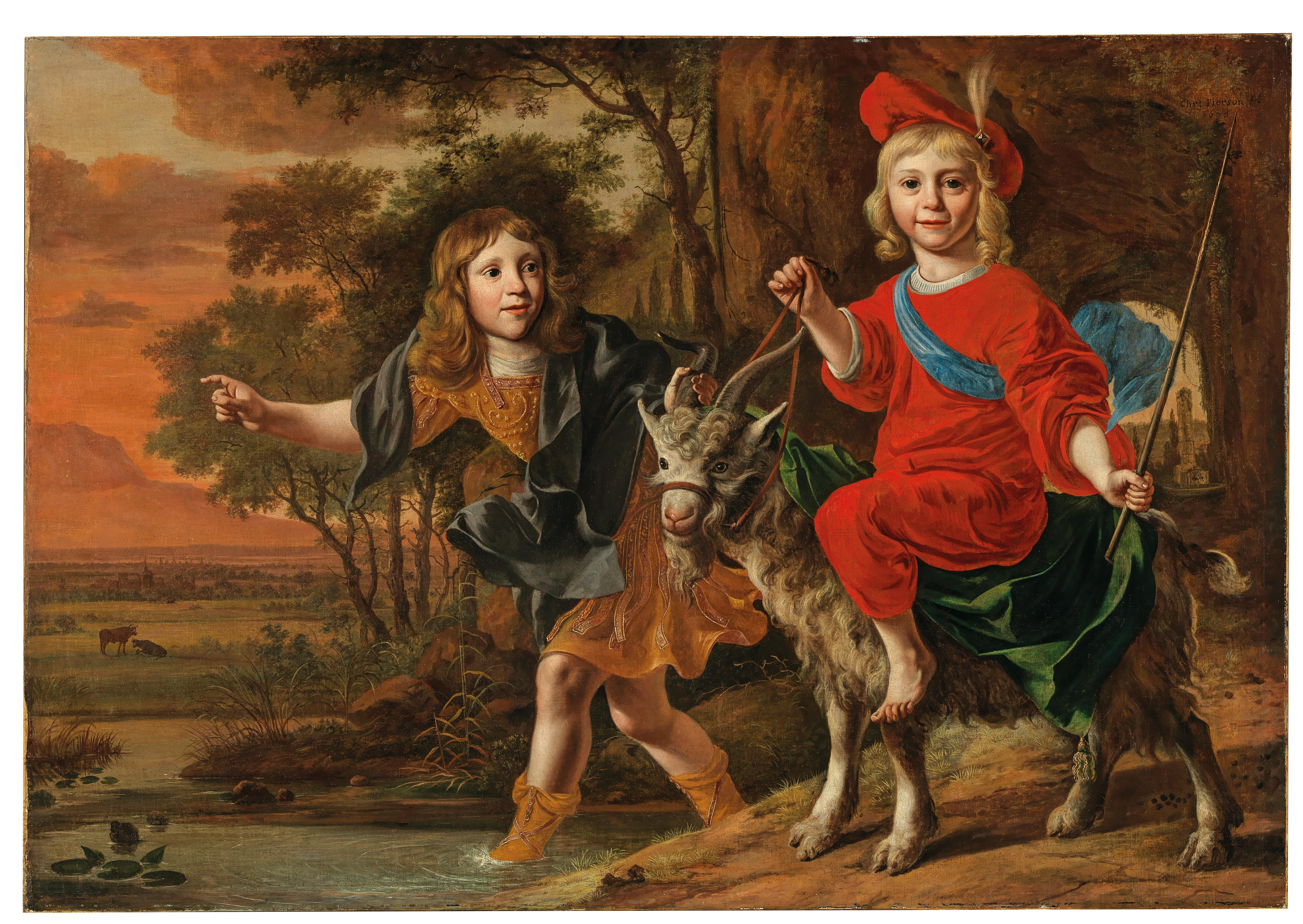
Children with a goat
