= Blood Meridian =

Epic historical novel by Cormac McCarthy

Blood Meridian or the Evening Redness in the West
- First edition cover
- Author: Cormac McCarthy
- Language: English, Spanish
- Genre: Anti-Western; Gothic Western; epic; historical fiction
- Publisher: Random House
- Publication date: April 1985
- Publication place: United States
- Media type: Print (hard and paperback)
- Pages: 337 (first edition), 351 (25th anniversary edition)
- ISBN: 0-394-54482-X (first edition, hardback)
- OCLC: 234287599
- Dewey Decimal: 813/.54 19
- LC Class: PS3563.C337 B4 1985
- Preceded by: Suttree
- Followed by: All the Pretty Horses

Blood Meridian or the Evening Redness in the West, commonly known as Blood Meridian, is a 1985 epic historical novel by American author Cormac McCarthy, classified as an anti-Western and Gothic Western. McCarthy's fifth book, it was published by Random House.

Set in the American frontier and drawing on historical events, the narrative follows a fictional teenager from Tennessee referred to as "the Kid", with the bulk of the text devoted to his experiences with the Glanton gang, a historical group of scalp hunters who massacred American Indians and others in the United States–Mexico borderlands from 1849 to 1850 for bounty, sadistic pleasure, and eventually, out of nihilistic habit. Judge Holden gradually emerges as the novel's antagonist, a physically massive, highly educated, preternaturally skilled member of the gang with pale and hairless skin who relishes the destruction and domination of whatever he encounters, including children and docile animals.

Although the novel initially received lukewarm critical and commercial reception, it has since become highly acclaimed and is widely recognized as McCarthy's magnum opus and one of the greatest American novels of all time, with some labelling the work as the Great American Novel.

== Plot ==
The novel follows a young man who is never directly named, only being referred to as "the Kid." The Kid was born in Tennessee during the Leonid meteor shower of 1833. At 14, he runs away and travels across several states, arriving in Nacogdoches, Texas, where he enters a tent in which a reverend is giving a sermon. Judge Holden enters and announces that the reverend is a wanted imposter, detailing excessive crimes and inciting the crowd to violence. The Judge reveals shortly afterward that he had never met the reverend, and caused the lynching for no reason at all. The Kid escapes, encountering and brawling with a mercenary named Toadvine, but later assists him with arson and assault. The Kid sees the Judge as he escapes town, and the Judge smiles at him.

In Bexar, the Kid kills a bartender for refusing him a drink. He is persuaded to join Captain White's company of ill-equipped filibusters. The militia is overwhelmed by Comanche warriors. The Kid escapes and wanders about with Sproule, another survivor of the massacre. After walking through a village ravaged by Comanches, the two force their way onto a wagon and ride to a nearby town, Sproule dying along the way. Soldiers later seize the Kid and take him to jail in Chihuahua City, where he finds Toadvine. Toadvine arranges for the pair and another inmate to be released into a gang of scalphunters led by a former Texas Ranger and cavalry veteran named John Joel Glanton. The Judge is in company.

The gang contracts to protect Chihuahua from marauding Apaches, receiving payment for each scalp. However, the gang kills anyone who can provide a passable scalp for a higher share, including residents of Mexican villages. A bounty is placed on Glanton after officials realize the gang's fraud. At the Colorado River, the gang discovers a ferry, appropriating it by conspiring with and betraying the nearby Yumas. The gang settles there, exploiting travelers until they are massacred by the Yumas. Many of the gang are killed, including Glanton.

The Kid is injured, but escapes with Toadvine to Alamo Mucho. The pair reunite with Tobin, a former priest, who is also a member of the Glanton gang. The Judge joins the trio, naked and unarmed. He bargains for Toadvine's hat, but is unable to bargain for the Kid's pistol. Tobin attempts to convince the Kid to shoot the Judge.

The Kid and Tobin depart towards Carrizo Creek. En route, the two encounter gang member Brown, who was detained in San Diego during the massacre. Brown has two horses and is equipped with two rifles. Tobin informs Brown that Glanton and the gang are dead, but that Toadvine and the Judge are behind.

As the Kid drinks from the creek, a gunshot hits his reflection. He sees two horses and the Judge, now clothed, with a rifle. The Kid kills the horses, and the Judge shoots Tobin through the neck. The Kid and Tobin continue on, pursued by the Judge, until the pair are found by Diegueños who feed them at their San Felipe camp.

The Kid and Tobin reach San Diego. Tobin searches for a doctor to treat their injuries, but the Kid is arrested before they can reunite. The Judge visits him in jail. The Kid is released and undergoes surgery. He dreams of the Judge while under anesthesia.

Later that year, the Kid sees Toadvine and Brown hanged in Los Angeles. The Kid buys and wears Brown's "scapular" of human ears. The Kid asks around for news of Tobin in San Diego and Los Angeles, but quits his search. The Kid wanders the Southwest. He carries with him a Bible that he is unable to read. In one episode, he discovers the remains of an old woman, attempting to offer her aid before he realizes that she is dead.

In 1878, the Kid, now 45, is referred to as "the man." He invites a lone group of youths to sit at his fire. The boys are interested in the scapular, but the congeniality sours as one of the boys challenges the man and later attempts to shoot him. The man kills the boy.

The man subsequently travels to Fort Griffin, Texas, where he enters a bar featuring a dancing bear. He spots the Judge across the bar, who has not aged. The dancing bear is killed by a bar patron. In the ensuing confusion, the Judge appears beside the man, and the two converse about philosophical themes of violence, war, and fate. The man visits the outhouse and opens the door, only to discover the Judge standing before him naked. The Judge grins, "gathers" the man against him, and latches the door, locking them both inside. Two drunken men leave the bar a short time later, inspecting the commotion. They look inside the outhouse and are horrified by the sight.

In the dance hall, the naked Judge dances and plays a fiddle. The novel concludes with the narrator remarking that the Judge "never sleeps," and that "he will never die."

== Characters ==
=== Major characters ===
- The Kid: The novel's anti-heroic protagonist or pseudo-protagonist, the Kid is an illiterate Tennessean whose mother died in childbirth. At 14, he runs away from his father and sister. He is said to have "a taste for mindless violence" and is involved in brutal actions throughout the novel. He enters inherently violent professions, those primarily being his recruitment into Captain White's filibuster company and later Glanton's gang of scalphunters, thereby securing release from a prison in Chihuahua, Mexico. The Kid takes part in many of the Glanton gang's scalp-hunting raids, including those against peaceful agrarian Native Americans and unprotected Mexican villages, but ultimately displays a moral fiber that puts him at odds with Judge Holden. "The Kid" is referred to as "the man" in the final chapter of the novel, which takes place in 1878.
- Judge Holden, or "the judge": A huge, pale, and hairless man who may or may not be supernatural. He is a polyglot and polymath and a keen examiner and recorder of the natural world. He is extremely violent and deviant. He is said to have accompanied Glanton's gang since they found him sitting alone on a rock in the middle of the desert. The judge subsequently saves the gunpowder-less gang from pursuing Apaches by leading them to natural materials, which he uses to make gunpowder. It is hinted that he and Glanton have some manner of pact. He gradually becomes the antagonist to the Kid after the dissolution of Glanton's gang, occasionally having brief reunions with the Kid. Unlike the rest of the gang, Holden is socially refined and remarkably well educated; however, he perceives the world as ultimately violent, fatalistic, and liable to an endless cycle of bloody conquest, with human nature and autonomy defined by the endurance and omnipresence of war. His beliefs are expounded upon in speeches and stories throughout the novel.
- John Joel Glanton, or simply "Glanton": The American leader, or "captain", of a gang of scalphunters who murder Native Americans and Mexican civilians and military alike. Few details are provided of his history or appearance, except that he is physically small with black hair, and has a wife and child in Texas. He is a clever strategist. His last major conquest is the gang's seizure of a profitable Colorado River ferry, which ultimately leads to an ambush by the Yumas in which he is killed.
- Louis Toadvine, or simply "Toadvine": A seasoned outlaw with whom the Kid brawls, though the Kid later assists him with assaulting a man, burning down a hotel in the process. Toadvine has no ears, and his forehead is branded with "H.T," for horse thief, and "F," for felon. He reappears unexpectedly as a cellmate of the Kid in the Chihuahua prison. There, he uses deception to negotiate the release of himself, the Kid, and one other inmate into Glanton's gang. Toadvine is not as depraved as some of the gang, questioning the killing of innocents, but is nonetheless a violent criminal. He is hanged in Los Angeles alongside David Brown.
- Ben Tobin, "the priest", or "the ex-priest": A member of the gang and formerly a novice of the Society of Jesus. Tobin remains deeply religious. He feels an apparently paternalistic bond with the Kid and abhors the judge and his philosophy. He and the judge gradually become great spiritual enemies, and he encourages the Kid at multiple junctures to shoot the judge, to no avail. He survives the Yuma massacre of Glanton's gang, but is non-fatally shot in the neck by the judge. He is last seen in San Diego, separating from the Kid to search for a doctor for both of their injuries. The Kid seeks news of him in San Diego and Los Angeles, but never hears from or meets him again.

=== Other recurring characters ===
- Captain White, or "the captain": An American veteran soldier and filibuster who believes that Mexico is a lawless nation destined to be conquered by the United States. Captain White leads a patchwork company of militants into Mexico along with the recently recruited "Kid." After weeks of travel through the harsh Mexican desert, the company is ambushed by a Comanche war party. Captain White escapes with a few of his "officers," but is ultimately caught and beheaded. Mexican soldiers show his preserved head in a jar to the Kid, who disavows any relationship to him.
- Bathcat, or "the Vandiemenlander": Born in the United Kingdom in Wales, Bathcat went to Van Diemen's Land to hunt Aborigines. He has three fingers on his right hand. Aside from a necklace (or "scapular") of ears, his most notable trait is a number tattooed on the inside of his forearm, suggesting that he may have been sent to the colony as a convict. He is tortured and killed by Native Americans during their travels through Pimería Alta; a fate that was foretold during his introduction.
- David Brown, or simply "Davy" or "Brown": A member of the Glanton gang who wears a necklace of human ears – likely taken from Bathcat's corpse. He is arrested in San Diego, having been sent there to purchase supplies for the gang's Colorado River settlement. He schemes his own release by tempting a young soldier with the coins in his possession, alleged money buried in the desert, and a plan to overthrow Glanton's profitable ferry operation, but shoots the soldier shortly after the two leave San Diego together. He impliedly deserts the gang and avoids the Yuma attack. He is hanged with Toadvine in Los Angeles. After his hanging, the Kid purchases his scapular of ears off a soldier and begins wearing it.
- James Robert Bell, or "the imbecile," "the idiot": A mentally-disabled man who becomes affiliated with the Glanton gang after his brother, Cloyce, joins. The idiot was sent to live with his brother in a box after the death of their mother. Before the brothers joined, Cloyce kept the idiot in a cage, advertising him as "The Wild Man" and charging money to see him. He is regularly depicted as naked and covered in his own feces. After he is bathed, dressed, and his cage is burned down by a well-meaning group of women at the Colorado River, he re-enters the river at night, loses his footing, and nearly drowns. The judge saves him, and the idiot subsequently remains attached to the judge. After escaping the Yuma attack with the help of the judge, the Judge is later seen leading him on a leash. However, by the time the judge visits the Kid in San Diego, the idiot is no longer present, leaving his fate unknown.
- John Jackson, or "Jackson": Two men in Glanton's gang – one Black and one White – share the name "John Jackson." There is deep-seated hostility between the Jacksons for reasons unexplained, though no one in the gang intervenes. After attempting to intimidate the Black Jackson away from a campfire with a threat of violence, the White Jackson is decapitated by the Black Jackson. "Black Jackson" assumes an integral role in the gang. While still referred to by numerous slurs, Jackson is nonetheless treated as part of a "body" that cannot have any part killed or violated. He appears to have a special relationship with Judge Holden, as the judge goes to great lengths to rescue him after a confrontation on a mountain pass, and he wears the same robes as the judge before becoming the first casualty of the Yuma attack.

== Themes ==
=== Violence ===
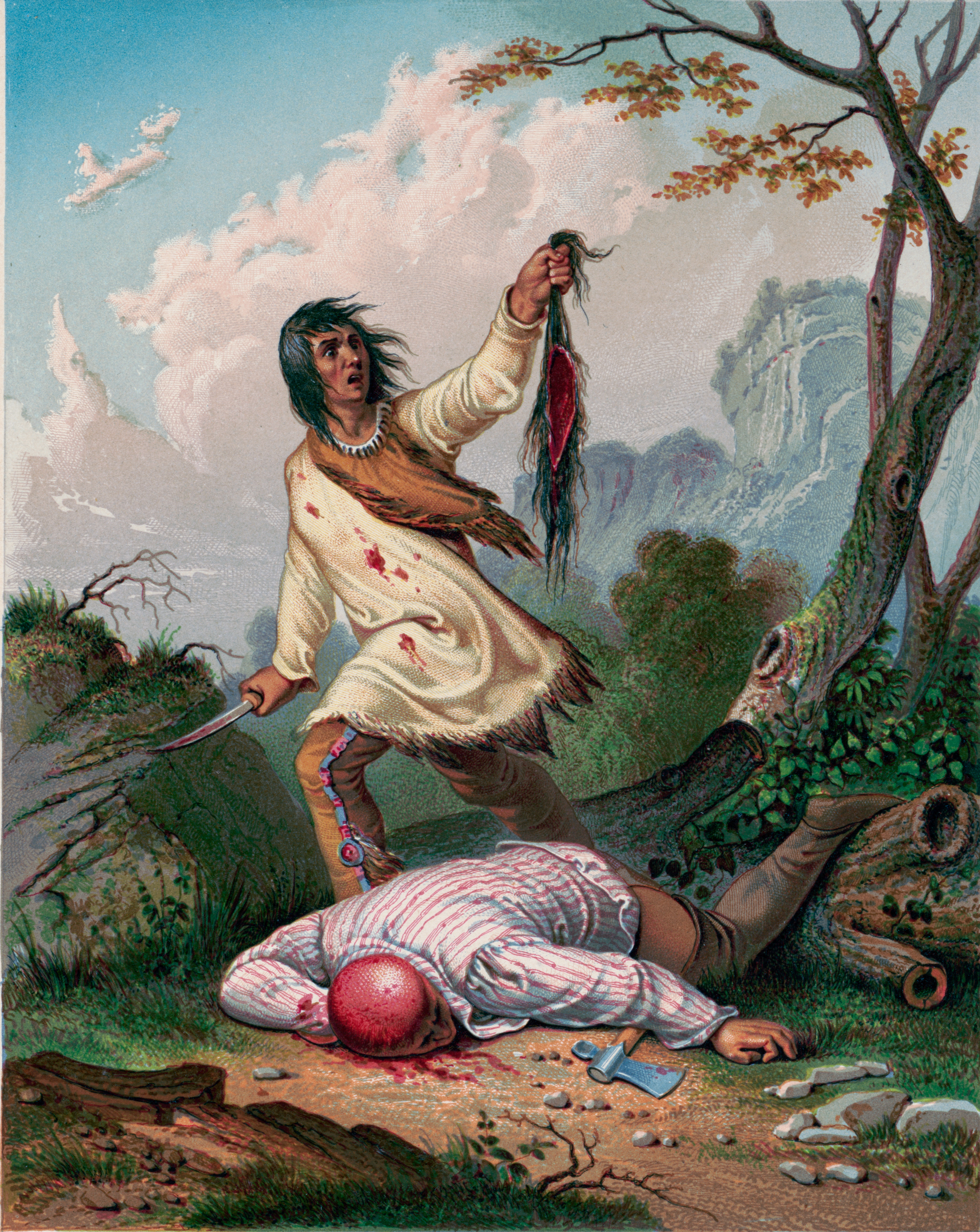
Scalping lithograph circa 1850s

One of the novel's central themes is humanity's tendency toward violence and warfare. Critic Harold Bloom praised Blood Meridian as one of the best 20th century American novels, "worthy of Herman Melville's Moby-Dick," but admitted that his "first two attempts to read through Blood Meridian failed, because [he] flinched from the overwhelming carnage."

Caryn James of The New York Times argued that the novel's violence was a "slap in the face" to modern readers cut off from brutality. Terrence Morgan thought the effect of the violence initially shocking, but then waned until the reader was desensitized. Billy J. Stratton of Arizona Quarterly contends that the brutality is the primary mechanism through which McCarthy challenges the "oppositional structure" of the conventional narrative of the Old West; "[R]eaders encounter characters that are often depicted as more animal than human in their behaviors, participating in a ruthless struggle for fortune and power. It is the absence of a recognizable heroic character along with the negation of the Eurocentric oppositions that McCarthy's deployment of animal imagery is meant to illuminate."

James D. Lilley argues that many critics struggle with the fact that McCarthy does not use violence for "jury-rigged, symbolic plot resolutions ... In McCarthy's work, violence tends to be just that; it is not a sign or symbol of something else." In her aforementioned review, Caryn James noted that McCarthy depicts characters of all backgrounds as evil, in contrast to contemporary "revisionist theories that make white men the villains and Indians the victims."

=== Epigraphs ===
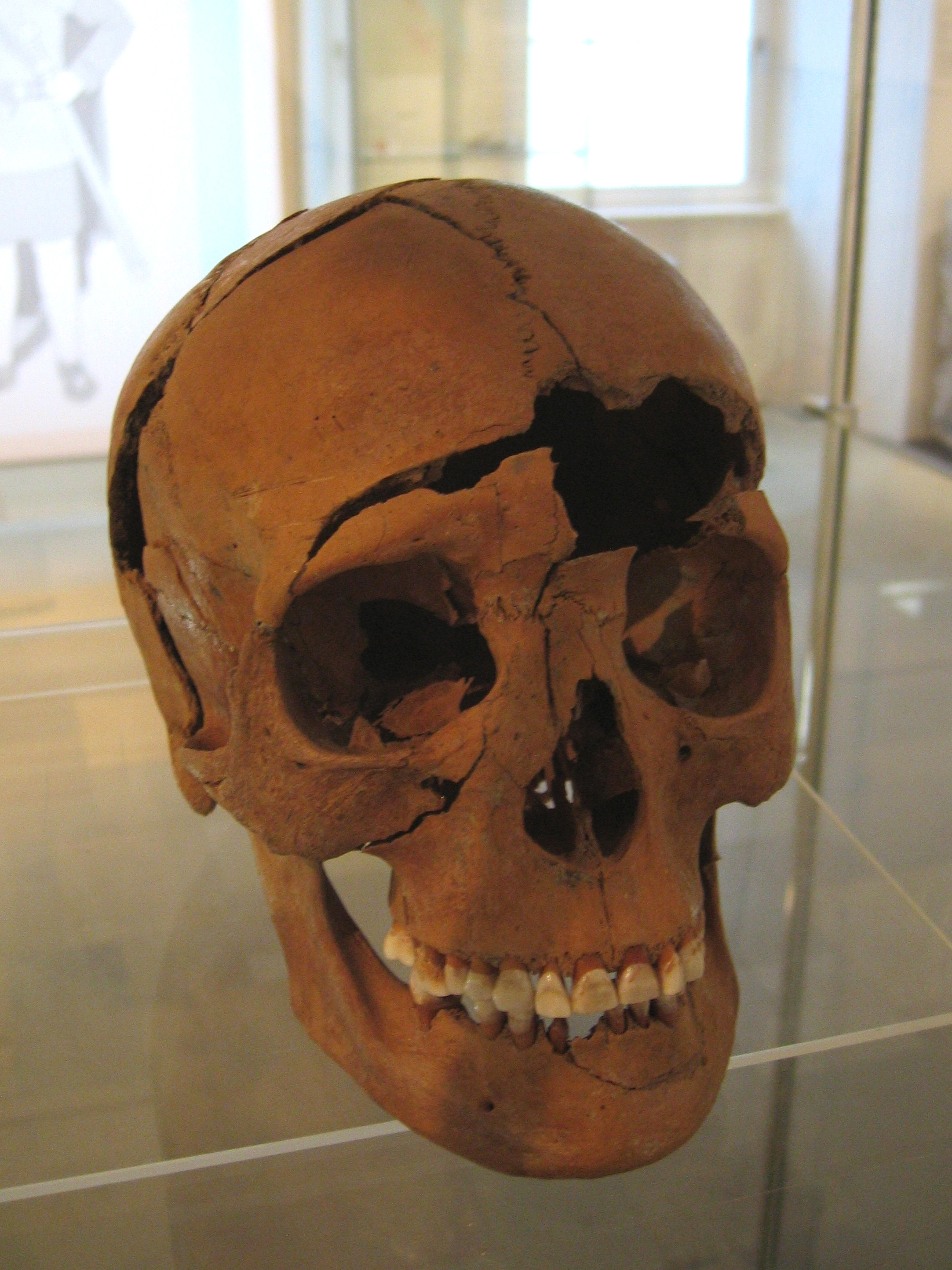
One of the epigraphs entails an ancient scalped skull.

"You can find meanness in the least of creatures, but when God made man the Devil was at his elbow. A creature that can do anything"

— The Old Hermit, pg. 19

Three epigraphs open the book: quotations from French writer Paul Valéry, from German Christian mystic Jakob Böhme, and a 1982 news clipping from the Yuma Sun reporting the claim of members of an Ethiopian archeological excavation that a fossilized skull three hundred millennia old seemed to have been scalped. Regarding the meaning of the epigraphs, David H. Evans writes that

[t]he taking of scalps, as McCarthy's third epigraph suggests, enjoys a profound antiquity, one coterminous with, perhaps, the beginnings of the species Homo sapiens.

=== Ending ===
The book does not narrate what happens between the man and the judge in the outhouse (referred to as the "jakes"), and none of the three men who look inside describe what is within. This allusive portrayal, in a book which otherwise depicts violence in explicit detail, has caused much comment. Many critics assert that Holden has murdered the Kid. Others propose that the judge instead humiliates the Kid by raping him or that the outcome is intentionally unknowable.

Epilogue

The epilogue is likewise cryptic and opaque. It describes a man progressing over the Western plain, digging holes with a tool that is likely a Vaughan post auger or similar implement. This tool was typically used for digging fence post holes for barbed wire fences, which were erected as settlers built ranches and claimed property throughout the Western United States. Fire is a major motif in the novel, and is mentioned twice in the short epilogue, including the narrator describing the digger as "striking the fire out of the rock which God has put there."

Behind the hole digger, among other people, are "bone pickers." This occupation arose in the late 1860s, when the bones of the massive numbers of buffalo slaughtered in the 1800s could be profitably collected and shipped to Eastern United States carbon and fertilizer factories.

=== Religion and philosophy ===
==== Hell ====
David Vann argues that the setting of the American southwest which the Gang traverses is representative of hell. Vann claims that the Judge's kicking of a head is an allusion to Dante's similar action in the Inferno.

==== Gnosticism ====
The second of the three epigraphs which introduce the novel, taken from the Christian theosophist Jakob Böhme, has incited varied discussion. The quote from Boehme is:

It is not to be thought that the life of darkness is sunk in misery and lost as if in sorrowing. There is no sorrowing. For sorrow is a thing that is swallowed up in death, and death and dying are the very life of the darkness.

Critics agree there are Gnostic elements in Blood Meridian, but they disagree on the precise meaning and implication of those elements.

Leo Daugherty argues that "Gnostic thought is central to Cormac McCarthy's Blood Meridian", (Daugherty, 122) specifically the Persian-Zoroastrian-Manichean branch of Gnosticism. He describes the novel as a "rare coupling of Gnostic 'ideology' with the 'affect' of Hellenic tragedy by means of depicting how power works in the making and erasing of culture, and of what the human condition amounts to when a person opposes that power and thence gets introduced to fate." Daugherty sees Holden as an archon and the Kid as a "failed pneuma" who feels a "spark of the alien divine."

Daugherty further contends that the violence of the novel can best be understood through a Gnostic lens. "Evil" as defined by the Gnostics was a far larger, more pervasive presence in human life than the rather tame and "domesticated" Satan of Christianity. As Daugherty writes, "For [Gnostics], evil was simply everything that is, with the exception of bits of spirit imprisoned here. And what they saw is what we see in the world of Blood Meridian."

However, Barcley Owens argues that while there are undoubtedly Gnostic qualities to the novel, Daugherty's arguments are "ultimately unsuccessful," because Daugherty fails to adequately address the pervasive violence and overstates the Kid's moral goodness.

==== Heraclitean philosophy ====
In his notes for the first draft of Blood Meridian, McCarthy recorded a quotation from the pre-Socratic philosopher Heraclitus and indicated that Judge Holden's statements on war, such as "war is god" or "war is the truest form of divination" were a rewriting and articulation of the quoted fragment. Heraclitus' Fragment 53 reads "War [pólemos in the original Greek, also translated as 'strife' or 'conflict'] is father of all and king of all; and some he manifested as gods, some as men; some he made slaves, some free".

Ian Alexander Moore argues that the judge's Heraclitean philosophy presents a "coherent, if disquieting metaphysics" in which "Being is itself warfare," and that the Kid's downfall stems from his "clemency" and refusal to attune himself to this "polemic nature of reality." Moore also identifies the appearance of other Heraclitean fragments throughout the novel, such as "fire as both one and all, the holiness of war as inherently just, and the oneness of the straight and winding way."

==== Theodicy ====
Douglas Canfield asserts that theodicy is the central theme of Blood Meridian. James Wood took a similar position, recognizing as a recurrent theme in the novel the issue of the general justification of metaphysical goodness in the presence of evil. Chris Dacus expressed his preference for discussing the theme of theodicy in its eschatological terms in comparison to the theological scene of the last judgment. This preference for reading theodicy as an eschatological theme was further affirmed by Harold Bloom in his recurrent phrase of referring to the novel as "The Authentic Apocalyptic Novel."

== Writing ==
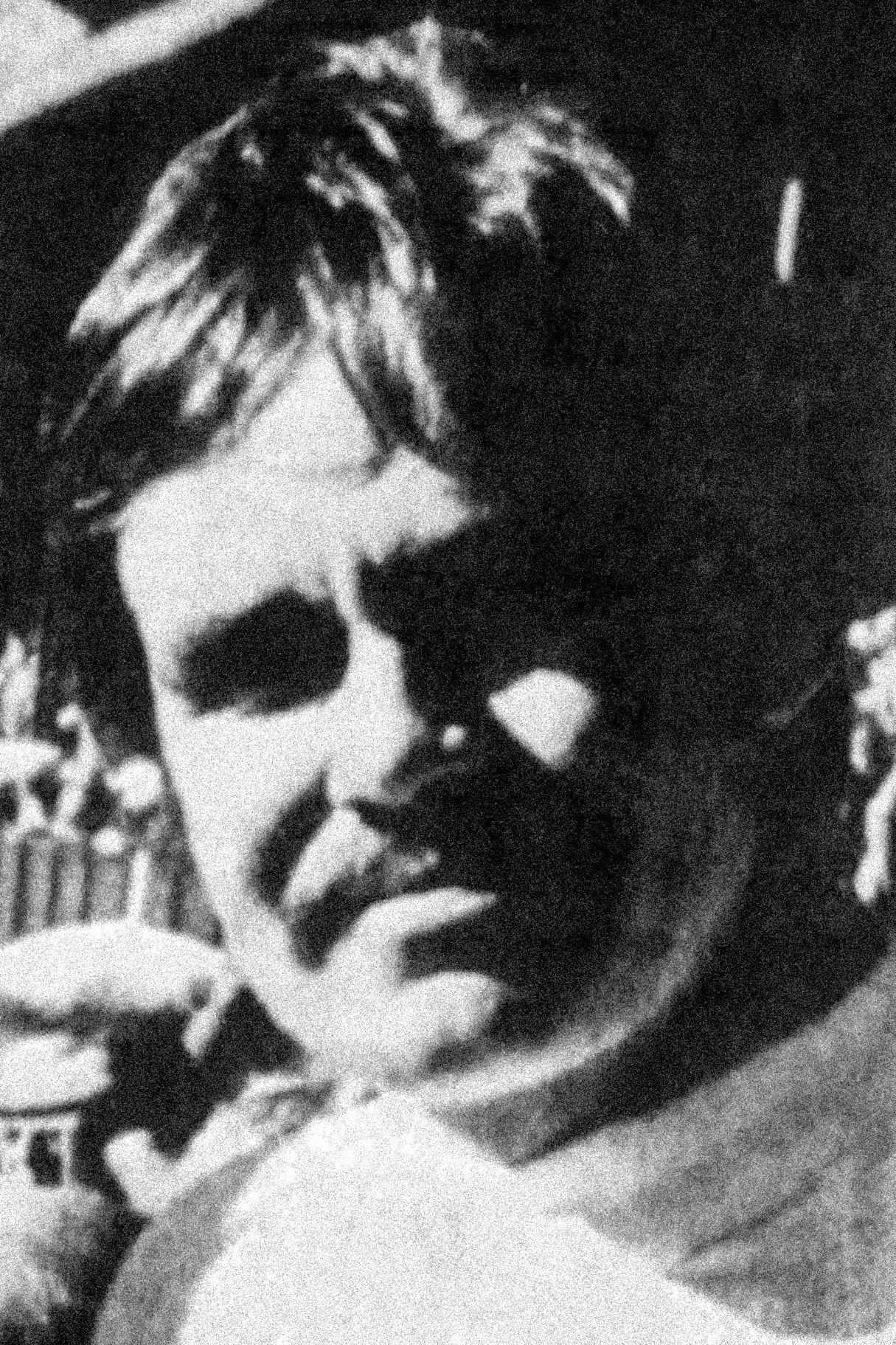
Cormac McCarthy in 1980, by which time he had already been working on Blood Meridian for about five years

McCarthy began writing Blood Meridian in the mid-1970s. In a letter sent around 1979 he said that he had not touched Blood Meridian in six months out of frustration. Nonetheless, significant parts of the final book were written in one go, "including the astonishing 'legion of horribles' passage".

A legion of horribles, hundreds in number, half naked or clad in costumes attic or biblical or wardrobed out of a fevered dream with the skins of animals and silk finery [...].

— Cormac McCarthy, Blood Meridian, IV.

McCarthy worked on the novel while living on the money he received from his MacArthur Fellows grant in 1981. It was his first attempt at a western and his first novel set in the Southwestern United States, a change from the Appalachian settings of his earlier work.

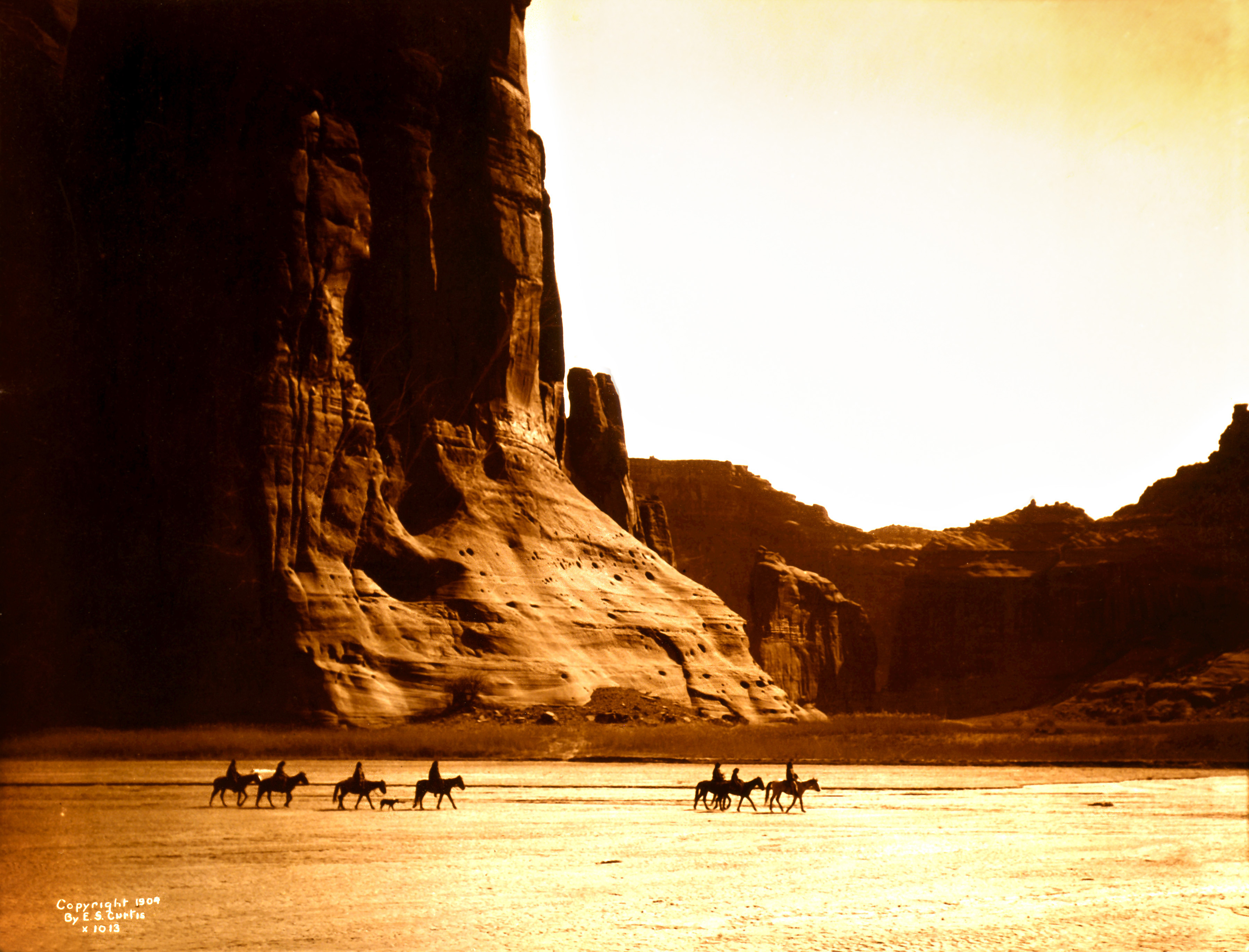
Edward S. Curtis – Canyon de Chelly (1904)

In 1974, McCarthy moved from his native Tennessee to El Paso, Texas, to immerse himself in the culture and geography of the American Southwest. He taught himself Spanish, which many of the characters of Blood Meridian speak. McCarthy conducted considerable research to write the book. Critics have repeatedly demonstrated that even brief and seemingly inconsequential passages of Blood Meridian rely on historical evidence. The book has been described as "as close to history as novels generally get".

The Glanton gang segments are based on Samuel Chamberlain's account of the group in his memoir My Confession: The Recollections of a Rogue. Chamberlain rode with John Joel Glanton and his company between 1849 and 1850. Judge Holden is described in Chamberlain's account but is otherwise unknown. Chamberlain writes:

The second in command, now left in charge of the camp, was a man of gigantic size who rejoiced in the name of Holden, called Judge Holden of Texas. Who or what he was no one knew, but a cooler-more blooded villain never went unhung. He stood six foot six in his moccasins, had a large, fleshy frame, a dull, tallow-colored face destitute of hair and all expression, always cool and collected. But when a quarrel took place and blood shed, his hog-like eyes would gleam with a sullen ferocity worthy of the countenance of a fiend ... Terrible stories were circulated in camp of horrid crimes committed by him when bearing another name in the Cherokee nation in Texas. And before we left Fronteras, a little girl of ten years was found in the chaparral foully violated and murdered. The mark of a huge hand on her little throat pointed out him as the ravisher as no other man had such a hand. But though all suspected, no one charged him with the crime. He was by far the best educated man in northern Mexico.

McCarthy's Judge was added to his manuscript in the late 1970s, a "grotesque patchwork of up-river Kurtz and Milton's Satan" and Chamberlain's account.

McCarthy physically retraced the Glanton Gang's path through Mexico multiple times, and noted topography and fauna. He studied such topics as homemade gunpowder to accurately depict the Judge's creation from volcanic rock.

=== Style ===
McCarthy's writing style involves many unusual or archaic words, dialogue in Spanish, no quotation marks for dialogue, and no apostrophes to signal most contractions. McCarthy told Oprah Winfrey in an interview that he preferred "simple declarative sentences" and that he used capital letters, periods, an occasional comma, a colon for setting off a list, but never semicolons. He believed there was no reason to "blot the page up with weird little marks". The New York Times described McCarthy's prose in Blood Meridian as "Faulknerian".

== Reception and reevaluation ==
Blood Meridian initially received little recognition, but has since been recognized as a masterpiece and one of the greatest works of American literature. Some have called it the Great American Novel. American literary critic Harold Bloom praised Blood Meridian as one of the 20th century's finest novels. Aleksandar Hemon has called it "possibly the greatest American novel of the past 25 years". David Foster Wallace named it one of the five most underappreciated American novels since 1960 and "[p]robably the most horrifying book of this [20th] century, at least [in] fiction."

Time magazine included Blood Meridian in its "Time 100 Best English-language Novels from 1923 to 2005". In 2006, The New York Times conducted a poll of writers and critics regarding the most important works in American fiction from the previous 25 years, and Blood Meridian was a runner-up.

== Literary significance ==
There has been no consensus in the interpretation of the novel. Americanist Dana Phillips said that the work "seems designed to elude interpretation". One scholar has described Blood Meridian as:

Lyrical at times, at others simply archaic and recondite, at still others barely literate: the dissociative style of Blood Meridian defies accommodation to conventional assumptions. And that's the point.

Nonetheless, academics and critics have suggested that Blood Meridian is nihilistic or strongly moral, a satire of the western genre or a savage indictment of Manifest Destiny. Harold Bloom called it "the ultimate western". J. Douglas Canfield described it as "a grotesque Bildungsroman in which we are denied access to the protagonist's consciousness almost entirely". Richard Selzer declared that McCarthy "is a genius – also probably somewhat insane." Critic Steven Shaviro wrote:

In the entire range of American literature, only Moby-Dick bears comparison to Blood Meridian. Both are epic in scope, cosmically resonant, obsessed with open space and with language, exploring vast uncharted distances with a fanatically patient minuteness. Both manifest a sublime visionary power that is matched only by still more ferocious irony. Both savagely explode the American dream of manifest destiny of racial domination and endless imperial expansion. But if anything, McCarthy writes with a yet more terrible clarity than does Melville.

— Steven Shaviro, "A Reading of Blood Meridian"

== Attempted film adaptations ==
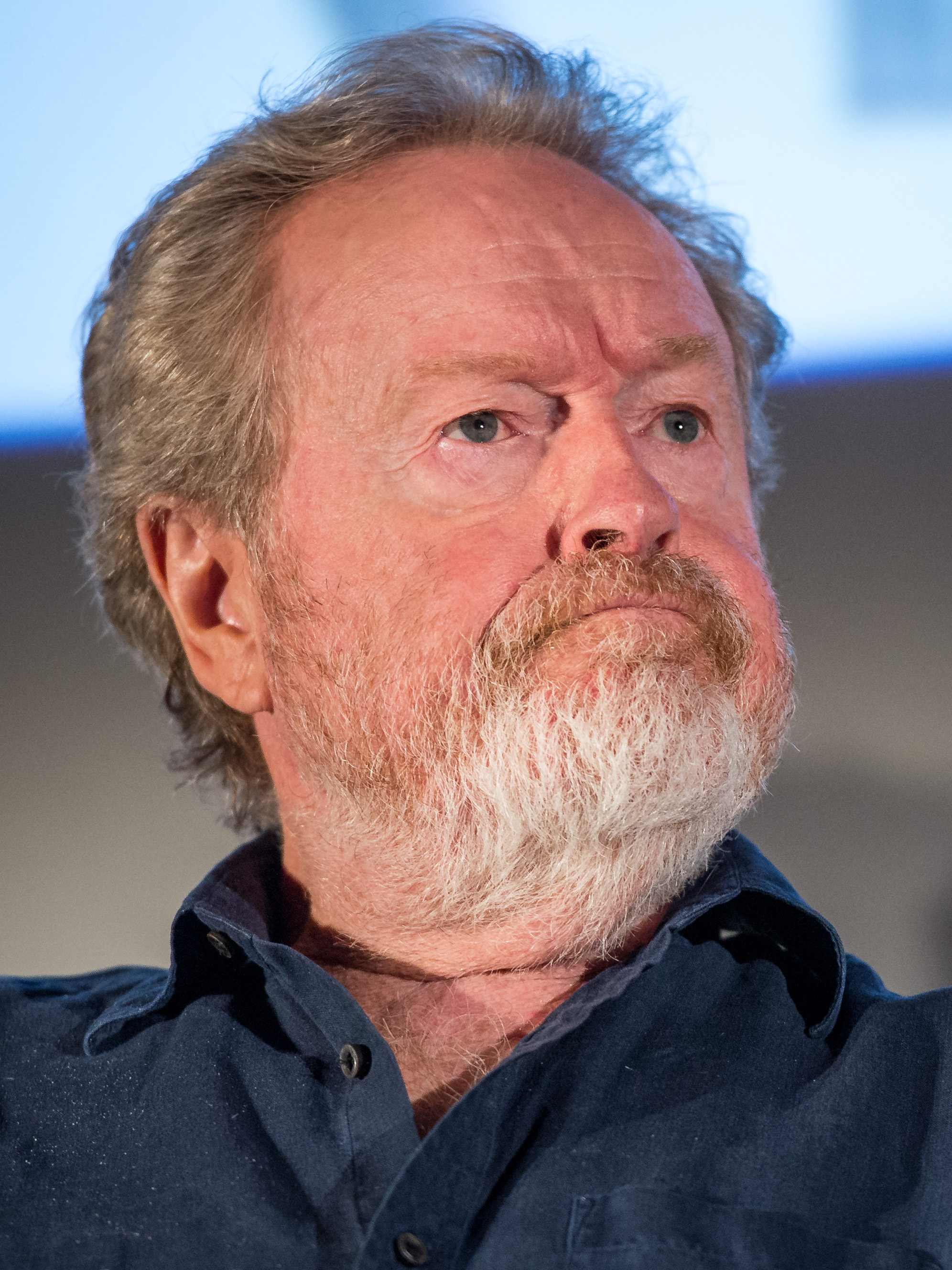
An attempt to adapt the novel by Ridley Scott ultimately faltered.

Since the novel's release many have noted its cinematic potential. The New York Times's 1985 review noted that the novel depicted "scenes that might have come off a movie screen". There have been attempts to create a motion picture adaptation of Blood Meridian, but all have failed during the development or pre-production stages. A common perception is that the story is "unfilmable" due to its unrelenting violence and bleak, nihilistic tone. In an interview with The Wall Street Journal in 2009 McCarthy denied this notion, with his perspective being that it would be "very difficult to do and would require someone with a bountiful imagination and a lot of balls. But the payoff could be extraordinary."

Screenwriter Steve Tesich first adapted Blood Meridian into a screenplay in 1995. In the late 1990s, Tommy Lee Jones acquired the film adaptation rights to the story and subsequently rewrote Tesich's screenplay with the idea of directing and playing a role in it. The production could not move forward due to film studios avoiding the project's overall violence.

Following the end of production for Kingdom of Heaven in 2004, screenwriter William Monahan and director Ridley Scott entered discussions with producer Scott Rudin for adapting Blood Meridian with Paramount Pictures financing. In a 2008 interview with Eclipse Magazine Scott confirmed that the screenplay had been written, but that the extensive violence was proving to be a challenge for film standards. This later led to Scott and Monahan leaving the project, resulting in another abandoned adaptation.

By early 2011, James Franco was considering adapting Blood Meridian, along with a number of William Faulkner and other Cormac McCarthy novels. After being persuaded by Andrew Dominik to adapt the novel, Franco shot 25 minutes of test footage starring Scott Glenn, Mark Pellegrino, Luke Perry, and Dave Franco. For undisclosed reasons, Rudin denied further production of the film. On May 5, 2016, Variety revealed that Franco was negotiating with Rudin to write and direct an adaptation to be brought to the Marché du Film, starring Russell Crowe, Tye Sheridan, and Vincent D'Onofrio. However, it was reported later that day that the project dissolved due to issues with the film rights.

In 2023, Deadline reported that New Regency is adapting Blood Meridian as a feature film. John Hillcoat, who previously directed an adaptation of McCarthy's novel The Road, is set to direct. Alongside his son John Francis, McCarthy was set to serve as an executive producer on the film; he will retain a posthumous credit following his death on June 14, 2023. John Logan was later announced to be adapting the story.

In a 2024 interview, Hillcoat said he and McCarthy spent extended time discussing the film, which the author once volunteered to write and envisioned as a "Faustian tale, the journey of the Judge trying to win the soul of the Kid, and consume everything in his path." McCarthy had rejected a miniseries proposal, finding television lacks a "kind of grandeur about it, an element of scale."
