= Judge Holden =

Possible historical figure and fictional character

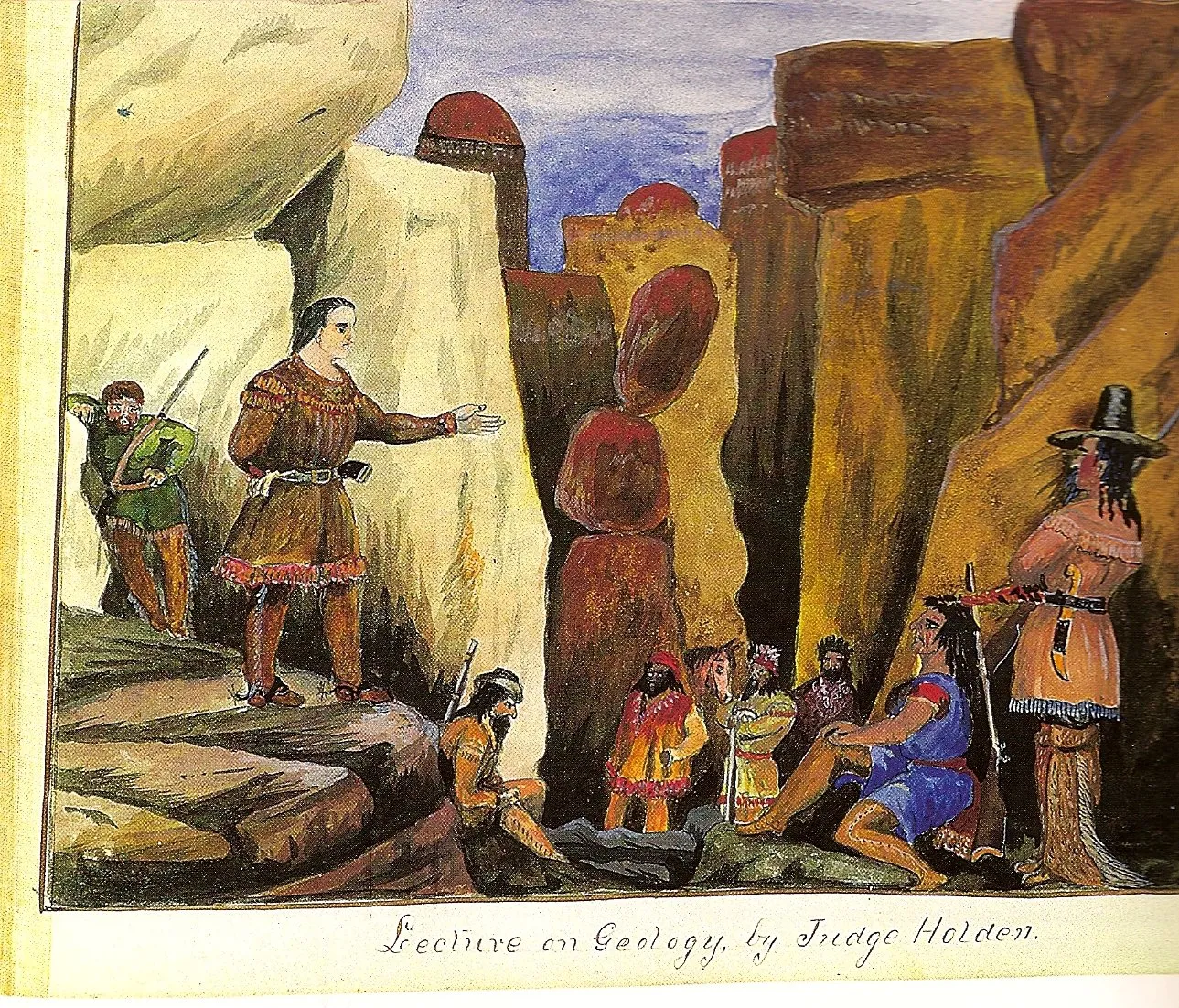
- Samuel Chamberlain's illustration of Judge Holden of Texas
- Born: Unknown, possibly around the 19th century
- Other names: Holden; Judge Holden of Texas
- Citizenship: American
- Occupation: Outlaw
- Known for: Scalp-hunting

Judge Holden is a purported historical outlaw who partnered with John Joel Glanton (died 1850) as a professional scalp-hunter in northern Mexico and the American Southwest. To date, the only attestation of his existence is Samuel Chamberlain's My Confession: Recollections of a Rogue (1855–61), an autobiographical account of Chamberlain's life as a soldier during the Mexican–American War.

Chamberlain described Holden as the most ruthless of the roving band of mercenaries led by Glanton, with whom Chamberlain had traveled briefly after the war: "[he] had a fleshy frame, [and] a dull tallow colored face destitute of hair and all expression"; "a man of gigantic size"; "by far the best educated man in northern Mexico"; "in short another Admirable Crichton, and with all an arrant coward". Chamberlain disliked Holden intensely.

He inspired a fictional character of the same name from the novel Blood Meridian by Cormac McCarthy who serves as the antagonist. Brent Edwin Cusher describes McCarthy's character as "a massive, hairless, albino man who excels in shooting, languages, horsemanship, dancing, music, drawing, diplomacy, science, and anything else he seems to put his mind to. Despite his almost infinite knowledge, which he can use to achieve anything he desires, Holden favours life as a ultimate consequences of willpower, judge doesn't kill out of hate, he is also the chief proponent and philosopher of the Glanton gang's lawless warfare." McCarthy's Judge Holden has been described as "perhaps the most haunting character in all of American literature".

== Historical basis ==
In Samuel Chamberlain's autobiographical My Confession, he describes Holden:

The second in command, now left in charge of the camp, was a man of gigantic size who rejoiced in the name of Holden, called "Judge" Holden of Texas. Who or what he was no one knew but a cooler blooded villain never went unhung; he stood six feet six in his moccasins, had a large fleshy frame, a dull tallow colored face destitute of hair and all expression. But when a quarrel took place and blood shed, his hog-like eyes would gleam with a sullen ferocity worthy of the countenance of a fiend. His desires was blood and women, and terrible stories were circulated in camp of horrid crimes committed by him when bearing another name, in the Cherokee nation and Texas; and before we left Fronteras a little girl of ten years was found in the chapperal, foully violated and murdered. The mark of a huge hand on her little throat pointed him out as the ravisher as no other man had such a hand, but though all suspected, no one charged him with the crime.

Holden was by far the best educated man in northern Mexico; he conversed with all in their own language, spoke in several Indian lingos, at a fandango would take the Harp or the Guitar from the hands of the musicians and charm all with his wonderful performance and out-waltz any poblana of the ball. He was "plum center" with a rifle or revolver, a daring horseman, acquainted with the nature of all the strange plants and their botanical names, great in geology and mineralogy, in short another Admirable Crichton [sc., the 16th-century Scottish prodigy and polymath], and with all an arrant coward.

Not but that he possessed enough courage to fight Indians and Mexicans or anyone else where he had the advantage in strength, skill, and weapons. But where the combat would be equal, he would avoid it if possible. I hated him at first sight and he knew it, yet nothing could be more gentle and kind than his deportment towards me; he would often seek conversation with me and speak of Massachusetts and to my astonishment I found he knew more about Boston than I did.

Some amateur historians have interpreted the name "Judge Holden" as a pseudonym, and hoped to establish his true identity. Popular candidates include Charles Wilkins Webber, an educated man in the region who once used the pseudonym "Holden", John Allen Veatch, a geologist who operated in the region and who led a scalp-hunting party into Mexico, and Michael Hancock Chevallie, a Virginia-educated high-ranking associate of Glanton's who is noticeably absent in Chamberlain's memoir. The omission may imply that "Judge Holden" was his alias.

== Blood Meridian ==
Judge Holden
- Blood Meridian character
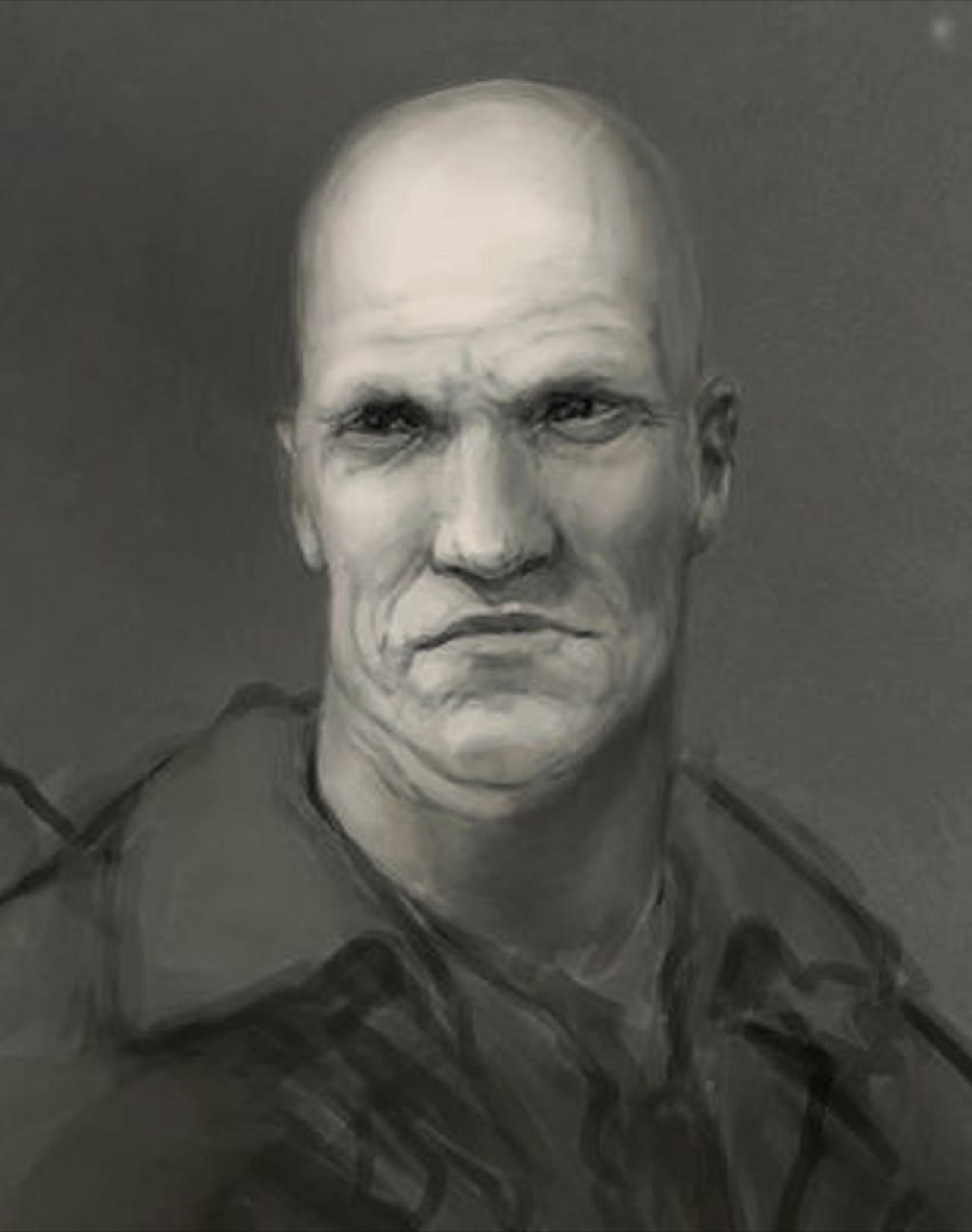
- Artist's impression of Judge Holden from Blood Meridian
- First appearance: Blood Meridian or The Evening Redness in the West
- Created by: Cormac McCarthy

In-universe information
- Full name: Holden (full name unknown)
- Nicknames: Judge Holden, The Judge
- Gender: Male
- Occupation: Scalphunter
- Affiliation: Glanton Gang
- Nationality: Unknown (Presumably American)
- Height: Nearly 7 ft 0 in (2.13 m)
- Weight: 336 lbs (152 kg)

A fictionalized Holden is a central character and main antagonist in Cormac McCarthy's 1985 Western novel Blood Meridian. In the novel, he and Glanton are the leaders of a pack of nomadic criminals who rob, rape, torture, and kill across the borderlands between the United States and Mexico. Throughout the novel, Holden brutally murders dozens of people, including children. Searching for additional evidence for Holden's existence has been a hobby for some Cormac McCarthy scholars.

As depicted in Blood Meridian, Holden is a mysterious figure, a cold-blooded killer, and, it is implied, a pedophile and a rapist; aside from the children he openly kills, he is seen enticing children with sweets, and a child often goes missing when he is in the vicinity. At one point in the novel, he is seen naked with a naked 12-year-old girl in his room. Holden displays knowledge of paleontology, archaeology, linguistics, law, draftsmanship, geology, chemistry, prestidigitation, and philosophy.

He is described as nearly 7 ft 0 in (2.13 m) tall and completely lacking body hair, including eyebrows and eyelashes. He is massive in frame, inhumanly strong, and a demonstrated polymath, noted as being exceedingly skilled at any task. He carries a rifle with the words "Et in Arcadia Ego (Even in Arcadia, I am)" inlaid in silver. Amongst other things, he is an excellent musician and dancer, a fine draftsman, exceptionally articulate and persuasive in several languages, and an unerring marksman. His skin is so pale as to have almost no pigment. This strange appearance, as well as his keen, extremely fast reflexes, strength, agility, apparent immunity to sleep and aging, and multifarious other abilities, point to his being something other than a normal human. In the final pages of the novel, McCarthy makes more direct reference to the Judge as a supernatural entity, Satan, a Djinn, or even as evil personified.

In 2002, Book magazine rated Holden as the 43rd greatest character in fiction since 1900. He is regarded as one of the greatest characters of modern literature, likened to a "Captain Ahab of the desert". Harold Bloom described him as "short of Moby Dick, the most monstrous apparition in all of American literature". Holden has been characterized as "perhaps the most haunting character in American literature".

=== Scholarly debate ===
In his essay "Gravers False and True: Blood Meridian as Gnostic Tragedy", literature professor Leo Daugherty argued that McCarthy's Holden is—or at least embodies—a gnostic archon (a kind of demigod). Harold Bloom, who declared Judge Holden to be "the most frightening figure in all of American literature", maintained that the character possessed immortality. However, unlike Daugherty, Bloom argues that Holden defies identification as being under any "system" such as Gnosticism, citing the passage in the book stating that there was no "system by which to divide [him] back into his origins". Rather, Bloom "resort[s]" to literary comparison with William Shakespeare's Iago, a methodical dispenser of strife.

Holden is also identified as a perverse manifestation of the Nietzschean übermensch and as Zarathustra.
