= Samuel Chamberlain =

Brevet Brigadier General, United States Army

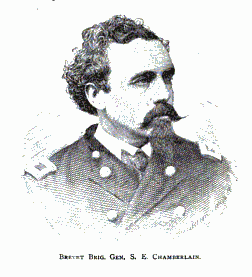
- Brig. Gen. Samuel Chamberlain
- Born: November 27, 1829; Center Harbor, New Hampshire, US
- Died: November 10, 1908 (aged 78); Worcester, Massachusetts, US
- Spouse: Mary Keith
- Children: 3
- Military career
- Allegiance: United States; Union
- Branch: United States Army; Union Army
- Service years: 1846–1849; 1861–1865
- Rank: Colonel; Brevet Brigadier General
- Nickname: Peloncillo Jack
- Units: 2nd Illinois Volunteer Regiment; 1st U.S. Dragoons
- Commands: 1st Massachusetts Cavalry; 5th Massachusetts Colored Cavalry
- Conflicts: Mexican–American War; Battle of Buena Vista; American Civil War; Battle of Kelly's Ford

Samuel Emery Chamberlain (November 27, 1829 – November 10, 1908) was an American soldier, painter, and author who traveled throughout the American Southwest and Mexico during the mid-19th century.

== Early life ==
Chamberlain was born in Center Harbor, New Hampshire, to Ephraim Chamberlain and Lydia Leonard Chamberlain and soon afterward moved to Boston, Massachusetts, where he spent most of his childhood. In 1844, at age 15, he left home without permission to go to Illinois. Two years later he joined the 2nd Illinois Volunteer Regiment and headed to Texas to participate in the Mexican–American War. In San Antonio, Chamberlain joined the regular army and became part of the 1st U.S. Dragoons. He fought at the Battle of Buena Vista in February 1847 as well as several other operations in Mexico. In 1849, he was declared a deserter and by 1854 he had returned home to Boston to raise a family. He married Mary Keith on July 4, 1855, and they had three children.

By his own account, Chamberlain was also involved in some less savory aspects of the Texas–Mexico border disputes. Most notably, he rode for a time with the infamous Glanton gang under the command of John Glanton, which was contracted by Mexican authorities to track and kill hostile Apaches following the war. The gang became notorious for taking scalps under highly questionable circumstances to claim the bounties, and its members were eventually declared outlaws by the Mexican government. Chamberlain's memoirs regarding this period are the only known primary source attesting to the existence of the Texian known as Judge Holden, Glanton's second-in-command. While Chamberlain and some others escaped, Glanton and a number of his gang were massacred by Yumas near what is now Yuma, Arizona, in April 1850. Following the massacre, Chamberlain is said to have traveled to California, where he stayed for three years.

== Civil War ==
During the American Civil War, after being chief of staff to Brigadier General William W. Averell and Lieutenant Colonel of the 1st Massachusetts Cavalry Regiment, Chamberlain commanded Camp Parole at Annapolis, Maryland, for a time and also commanded the 5th Massachusetts Colored Cavalry, an all African-American unit, with the rank of colonel. He was wounded on six occasions during the war, including on March 17, 1863, at Kelly's Ford, Virginia, when a Confederate bullet hit his left cheekbone. On February 24, 1865, President Abraham Lincoln nominated Chamberlain for the award of the honorary grade of brevet brigadier general, U.S. Volunteers, to rank from February 24, 1865, and the U.S. Senate confirmed the award on March 3. Chamberlain was mustered out of the U.S. Volunteers on September 16, 1865.

== Later life ==
After the war, Chamberlain served as deputy quartermaster general of Massachusetts and later as warden of state prisons in Charlestown, Massachusetts, and Wethersfield, Connecticut. He retired in 1893, living in Barre Plains near Worcester. Settling in Massachusetts with his family, Chamberlain became well known for his charming paintings, which consist largely of landscapes and battle scenes depicting the Mexican–American War. A large collection, reproduced in a book edited by William Goetzmann, is held at the San Jacinto Museum of History.

Chamberlain also authored and illustrated a harrowing autobiographical account of his travels during the 1840s, especially his service in the Mexican–American War and his adventures with the Glanton gang, entitled My Confession: The Recollections of a Rogue, which he wrote between 1855 and 1861. Though many of its stories are exaggerated in the romantic literary style popular at the time, research has corroborated most of them as true. Noted for its authentic descriptions of the experiences of the typical American soldier during the Mexican–American War, Chamberlain's account continues to serve as a valuable primary source text for historians studying the war. The account also informed the narrative and characters of author Cormac McCarthy's 1985 novel Blood Meridian; the novel's protagonist, known only as "the Kid", is said to be loosely based on Chamberlain. Both of them ran away from home as teenagers and joined the Glanton Gang after volunteering to fight in a conflict in Mexico. Life published a version of the text in its July 23, July 30, and August 6, 1956 issues.

Chamberlain died on November 10, 1908, in Worcester, Massachusetts, and was buried in Mount Auburn Cemetery.

== See also ==
- List of Massachusetts generals in the American Civil War
- Massachusetts in the American Civil War

== Gallery ==
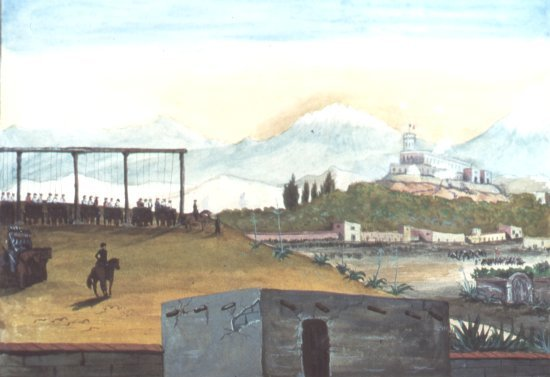
Hanging of the San Patricios

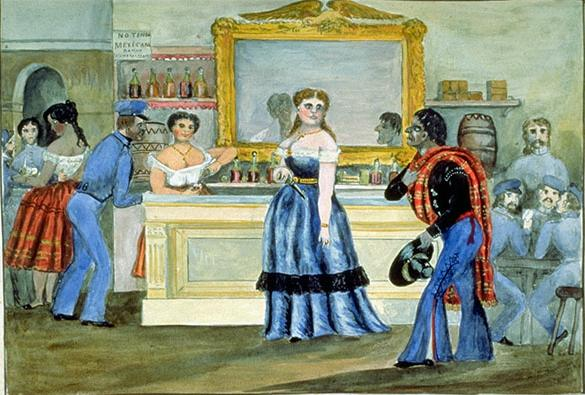
The Great Western as Landlady, a portrait of Sarah A. Bowman

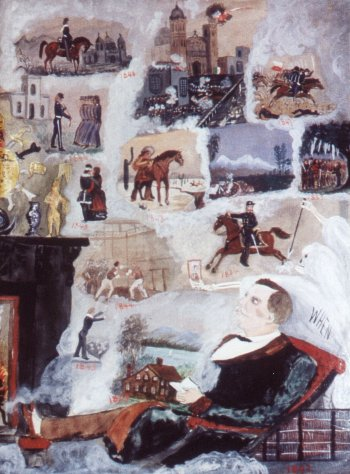
Sam in his old age, recalling the Mexican War
